= R. C. S. Walters =

British civil engineer, geologist and author (1888-1980)

Rupert Cavendish Skyring Walters FGS (21 July 1888 – 19 February 1980) was a New Zealand-born British civil engineer, geologist and author, specialising in water supply. He is known for his work on the dams at British reservoirs including Sutton Bingham, Lamaload, Weir Wood, Drift and Stithians. He spent much of his career at Herbert Lapworth Partners (1932–67) in London. His books were The Ancient Wells, Springs, and Holy Wells of Gloucestershire (1928), The Nation's Water Supply (1936) and Dam Geology (1962), and he also published on English hydrogeology and the history of engineering in antiquity. He was the president of the Institution of Water Engineers (1951–52), and an elected fellow of the Geological Society of London and Institution of Civil Engineers.

== Early life and education ==
Walters was born on 21 July 1888, (Note: Westminster School gives 1889.) the only child of Ethel Mary Aileen (née Skyring) and William Charles Flamstead Walters (died 1927), a British classicist known as the co-editor of the Oxford edition of Livy, who was then employed at Christ's College school in Christchurch, New Zealand. The family returned to the UK when R. C. S. Walters was a child; according to a family member, he and his mother acted in Ben Greet's Company until her death of typhoid in 1902. He was educated at Westminster School (1904–7), and later read engineering at King's College London, where his father was fellow, professor and dean in the arts faculty. In 1908, Walters entered the Officers' Training Corps, where he remained until 1912. He gained his Bachelor of Science degree in 1917.

== Career ==
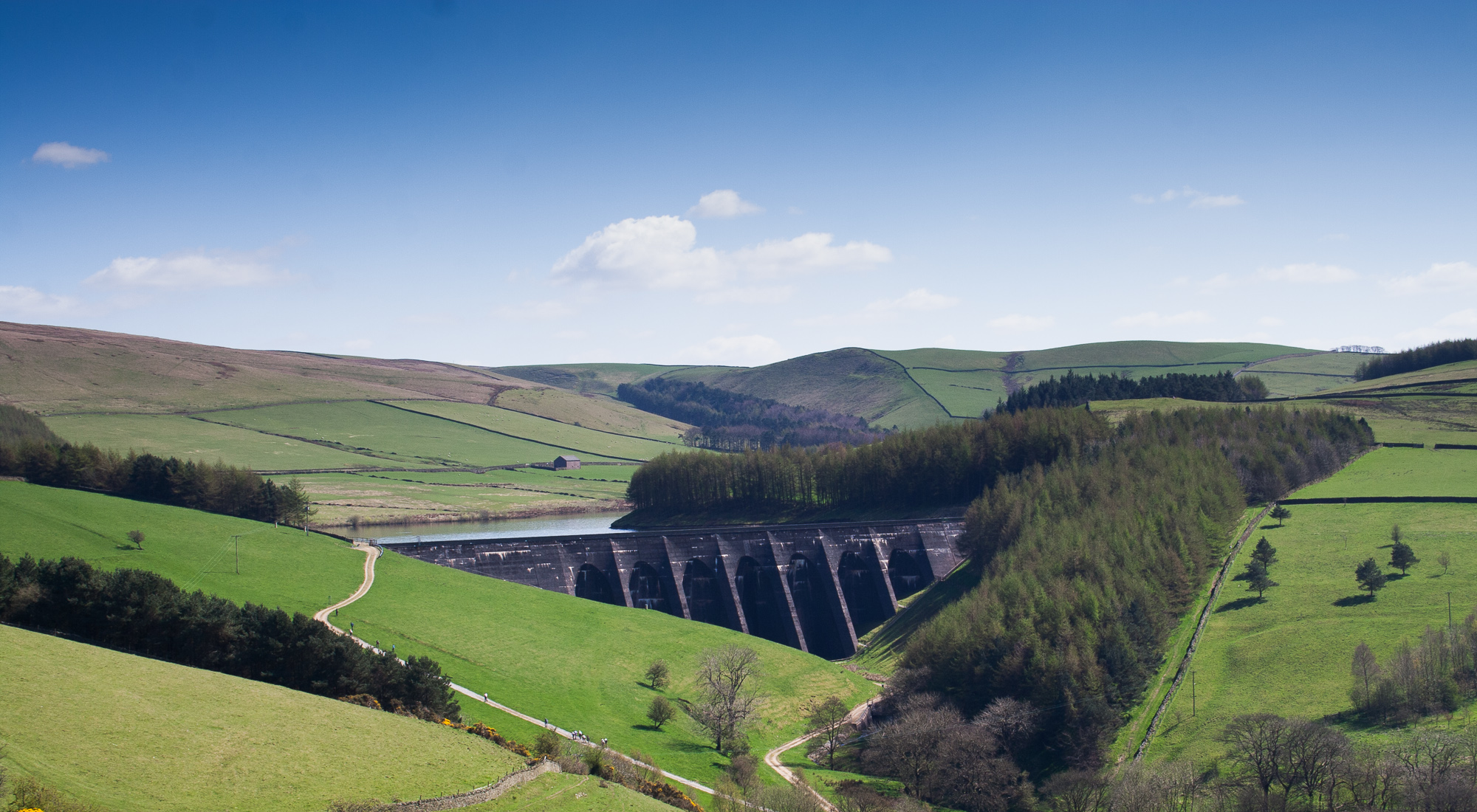
Lamaload Reservoir, one of Walters' projects

During the First World War, Walters was found medically unfit for army service and worked on designing army camps on Salisbury Plain. After the war, he worked as a resident engineer under Sir John Hunter before joining Herbert Lapworth Partners in 1932, where he was later made a partner. In 1967 he joined Rofe, Kennard and Lapworth.

His work was predominantly in the field of water supply. According to his obituary in The Times, focusing attention on the site's underlying geology was among his most significant contributions. His major projects include dams at Sutton Bingham Reservoir supplying Yeovil in Somerset (1951), Lamaload Reservoir supplying Macclesfield in Cheshire, Weir Wood Reservoir supplying Crawley in West Sussex, and Drift and Stithians Reservoirs, both in Cornwall; he contributed to the design of the dam for Scammonden Reservoir, supplying Huddersfield, West Yorkshire. He also developed the Thames Basin and other groundwater projects.

== Writings ==
Walters published three books. His earliest book, The Ancient Wells, Springs, and Holy Wells of Gloucestershire: Their Legends, History, and Topography (1928), a description of holy wells in that county, appeared under the name "R. C. Skyring Walters". A reviewer for The Geographical Journal gives a positive short review, commenting that the book might help in preserving the historical records on the topic. A more-critical review appeared in Nature; the reviewer disputes Walters' assertion that the custom of making small offerings to such wells originated with the Romans, considering that the widespread nature of the custom suggests an earlier origin, and also characterises "Christian well-worship" as a "contradiction in terms". He researched the subject of holy wells and springs, mainly in England and Wales, from 1924 until his death, and also prepared an unpublished work on Kent. His notes, photographs and other materials on the topic are archived by the British Geological Survey.

His 1936 book, The Nation's Water Supply, is a non-technical work on the domestic supply in Britain, aimed at a general audience. Topics include how rainfall and local geology interact to determine how much water is available at a location; water quality, particularly the differences between water from upland (reservoir) and underground sources; Britain's system of impounding reservoirs, underground water sources and rivers; water treatments and engineering works; and relevant legislation. A review in The Times describes it as an "authoritative and comprehensive account", and describes the illustrations as "outstanding". A review in The Geographical Journal calls it an "excellent treatise" and also compliments the coloured maps and other illustrations; the reviewer criticises its lack of detail on measuring loss into rivers, its "non-committal" treatment of divining rods, and its "guarded" treatment of compensation water. His final book was the textbook, Dam Geology (1962, 1971). He published research papers on the hydrogeology of the Chalk Group (1929) and of Jurassic Oolitic Limestone (1936).

He was also interested in the history of engineering in antiquity. He gave a well-received paper at the Newcomen Society in 1921 on Greek and Roman engineering instruments, especially those of Vitruvius and Hero of Alexandria, which concluded that the instruments and techniques used in antiquity were surprisingly similar to then-contemporary methodology; it was described as "very instructive" by F. S. Marvin in a review for Nature. He also translated five works by Hero of Alexandria on mechanics, catoptrics and the dioptra.

== Awards and societies ==
He was a fellow of the Geological Society of London and of the Institution of Civil Engineers. In 1930, he received the inaugural Whitaker Medal of the Institution of Water Engineers (now part of the Geological Society) for his paper entitled, "The hydrogeology of the Chalk of England". He served as president of the Institution of Water Engineers (1951–52) and of the UK section of the Société des Ingénieurs Civils de France (1951), and was a council member of the Geological Society and of the Freshwater Biological Association.

== Personal life ==
He was known as "Cavendish Walters" or familiarly "Caven". On 12 May 1932, he married Sylvia Doreen Barham Beal; they had three daughters and a son. They lived at Gerrards Cross in Buckinghamshire.

Walters died on 19 February 1980.
