= Cynthia Carew Pole =

British socialite and politician

Lady Carew Pole OBE

County Alderman for Cornwall

Member of the Cornwall Council

Personal details
- Born: Cynthia Mary Burns; 1908
- Died: 14 March 1977 (aged 68–69) Antony, Cornwall, U.K.
- Spouse: Sir John Carew Pole, 12th Baronet
- Children: 3 (including Sir Richard Carew Pole, 13th Baronet)

Cynthia Mary Carew Pole, Lady Carew Pole OBE (née Burns; 1908 – 14 March 1977) was a British socialite and local councillor who was active in civic organisation in Cornwall. She was married to Sir John Carew Pole, 12th Baronet and lived at Antony House in Cornwall.

== Family ==
Carew Pole was born Cynthia Mary Burns and was the only daughter of Walter Burns and Ruth Evelyn Burns (nee Cavendish-Bentinck), who lived at North Mymms Park, Hatfield, Hertfordshire.

Walter Spencer Morgan Burns was member of the American Morgan Banking Family; through his mother, he was a nephew of J. P. Morgan and grandson of Junius Spencer Morgan; Walter was also the brother of Mary Harcourt, Viscountess Harcourt who married British Cabinet Minister Lewis Harcourt, 1st Viscount Harcourt.

Ruth Evelyn Cavendish-Bentinck was the daughter of William George Cavendish-Bentinck and Elizabeth Livingston, of the prominent Livingston family of New York. Ruth was a first-cousin of the 8th Duke and 9th Duke of Portland, and a third-cousin of the 7th Duke of Portland and Queen Elizabeth the Queen Mother.

== Political career ==
In 1946, Carew Pole was a candidate for Cornwall County Council for Torpoint. She was co-opted onto the council and served as a member until at least 1962. During her tenure, she chaired the council's committees on civil defence and on children. In 1958, she was elected a county alderman. She was also a member of St Germans Rural Council and Torpoint Urban Council for a period after the Second World War, at one time being on all three councils simultaneously. She chaired St Germans council's housing committee from 1946 to 1949.

Carew Pole was a member of the consultative council of South Western Electricity, including serving as the council's chair and a part-time member of the company's board. In January 1959, it was reported that she had recently been appointed by the Minister of Fuel and Power to a committee investigating potential for greater co-operation between electricity and gas boards.

== Civic work ==
Carew Pole was involved with the Women's Voluntary Service (WVS) from its inception. She first worked for the organisation in Reading, later becoming the organiser for Cornwall. She was awarded an OBE in the 1959 New Year Honours for her services with the WVS.

Carew Pole was also active within local civic and charitable organisations, especially those related to health and education. She was the president of a local branch of the Arthritis and Rheumatism Council and chair of the Three Towns Nursing Association in Plymouth, as well as serving in various positions in the Royal Cornwall Agricultural Association.

In 1931, Carew Pole ceremonially launched the new Torpoint Ferry.

== Personal life ==
Carew Pole cultivated a significant number of daylilies in the gardens of Antony House between 1960 and her death; they were later made a National Plant Collection. She was keen sportswoman and noted as a fine tennis player.

=== Marriage ===
She married Sir John Carew Pole, 12th Bt on 12 June 1928 at St Margaret's Church, Westminster; wedding gifts were sent by Princess Mary and the King and Queen. Cynthia's bridesmaids were Lady Anne Cavendish, Lady Catherine Willoughby (daughter of the Earl of Ancaster), Lady Moira Forbes (daughter of the Earl and Countess of Granard), and Victoria Pole-Carew, John's sister. The ceremony was noted as a "large and fashionable gathering" and attendees included, among others, Princess Victoria; the Duchess of Devonshire; the Duchess of Roxburghe; Lady Astor; and Constance, Duchess of Westminster and her daughter Mary.

The marriage produced three children:

- Elizabeth Mary Carew Pole (1929–2021), who married David Cuthbert Tudway Quilter (1921–2007), grandson of Sir Cuthbert Quilter, 1st Baronet (1841–1911), and nephew of Sir Cuthbert Quilter, 2nd Baronet, and Roger Quilter
- Caroline Anne Carew Pole (1933–2018), who married The Hon. Paul Asquith (1927–1984), the son of Cyril Asquith, Baron Asquith of Bishopstone
- Sir John Richard Walter Reginald Carew Pole, 13th Baronet (1938–2024), who married Mary Dawnay, a granddaughter of Charles Grey, 5th Earl Grey

Following Cynthia's death in 1977, her husband remarried Joan Fulford, the widow of Lt-Colonel Anthony Fulford, in 1979.

== Death ==
Carew Pole died at Antony House on 14 March 1977, aged 69, after a long illness. A private funeral was held on 19 March at the village church, where she was buried.

A memorial service was held at Truro Cathedral on 4 April. The service was led by H. M. Lloyd (the Dean of Truro), A. L. Rowse gave the address, and the Bishop of Truro Graham Leonard led closing prayers. The music was arranged by John Winter.

Cynthia was survived by her only sibling Major General Sir George Burns; following Burns' death in 1997, the family's North Mymms Park estate was inherited by Cynthia's son Sir Richard Carew Pole (although Sir George had sold the main house in 1979).

== Ancestry ==
Ancestors of Cynthia Carew Pole

William Burns
Walter Hayes Burns
Mary Leaming Fisher
Walter Spencer Morgan Burns
Junius Spencer Morgan
Mary Lyman Morgan
John Pierpont
Juliet Pierpont
Mary Sheldon Lord
Cynthia Carew Pole
Lord Frederick Cavendish-Bentinck
George Cavendish-Bentinck
Mary Lowther
William George Cavendish-Bentinck
Charles Powell Leslie
Prudentia Penelope Leslie
Anne Ryder
Ruth Evelyn Cavendish-Bentinck
Maturin Livingston
Maturin Livingston Jr.
Margaret Lewis
Elizabeth Livingston
Ruth Baylies
