= Lamaload Reservoir =

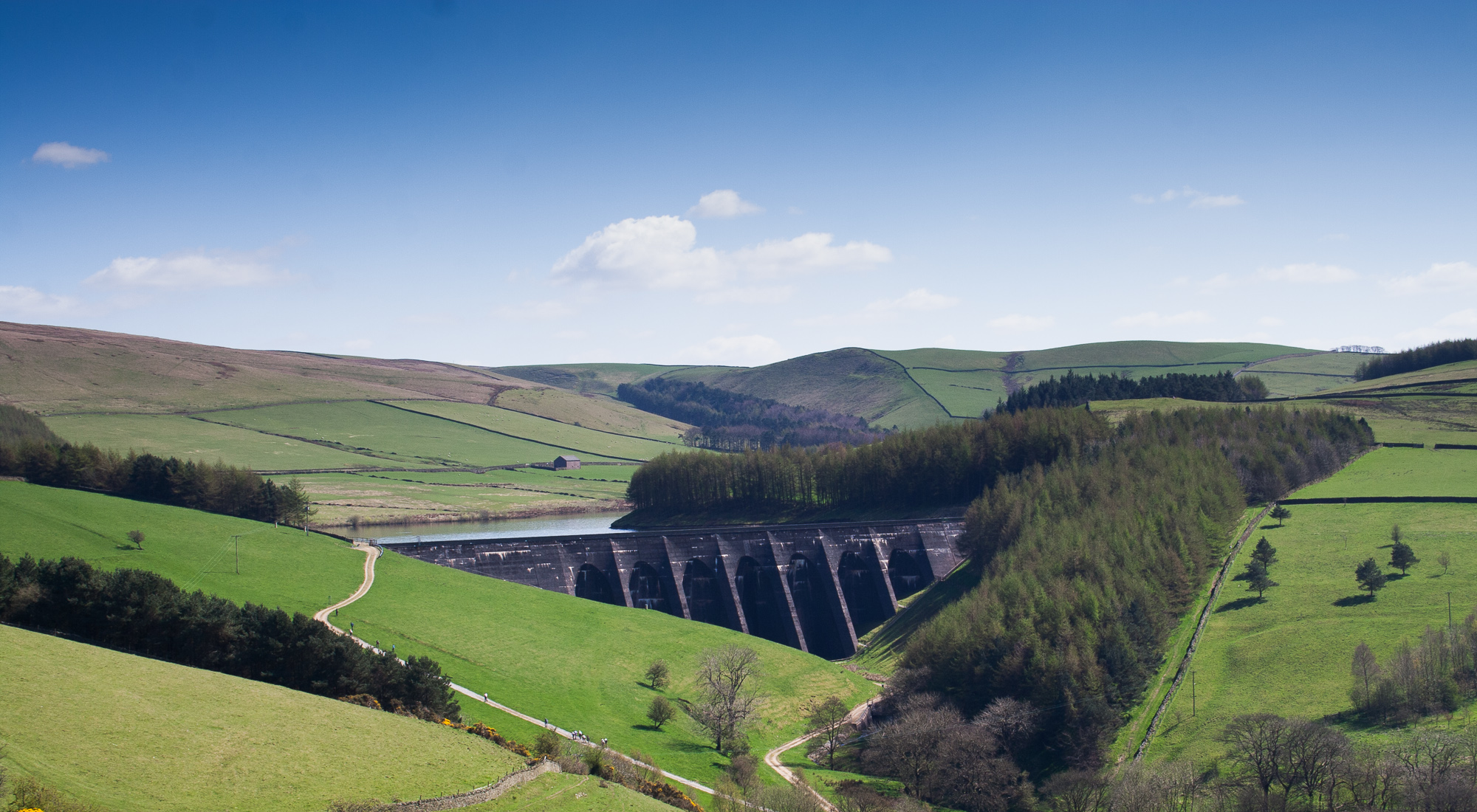
- Reservoir and dam

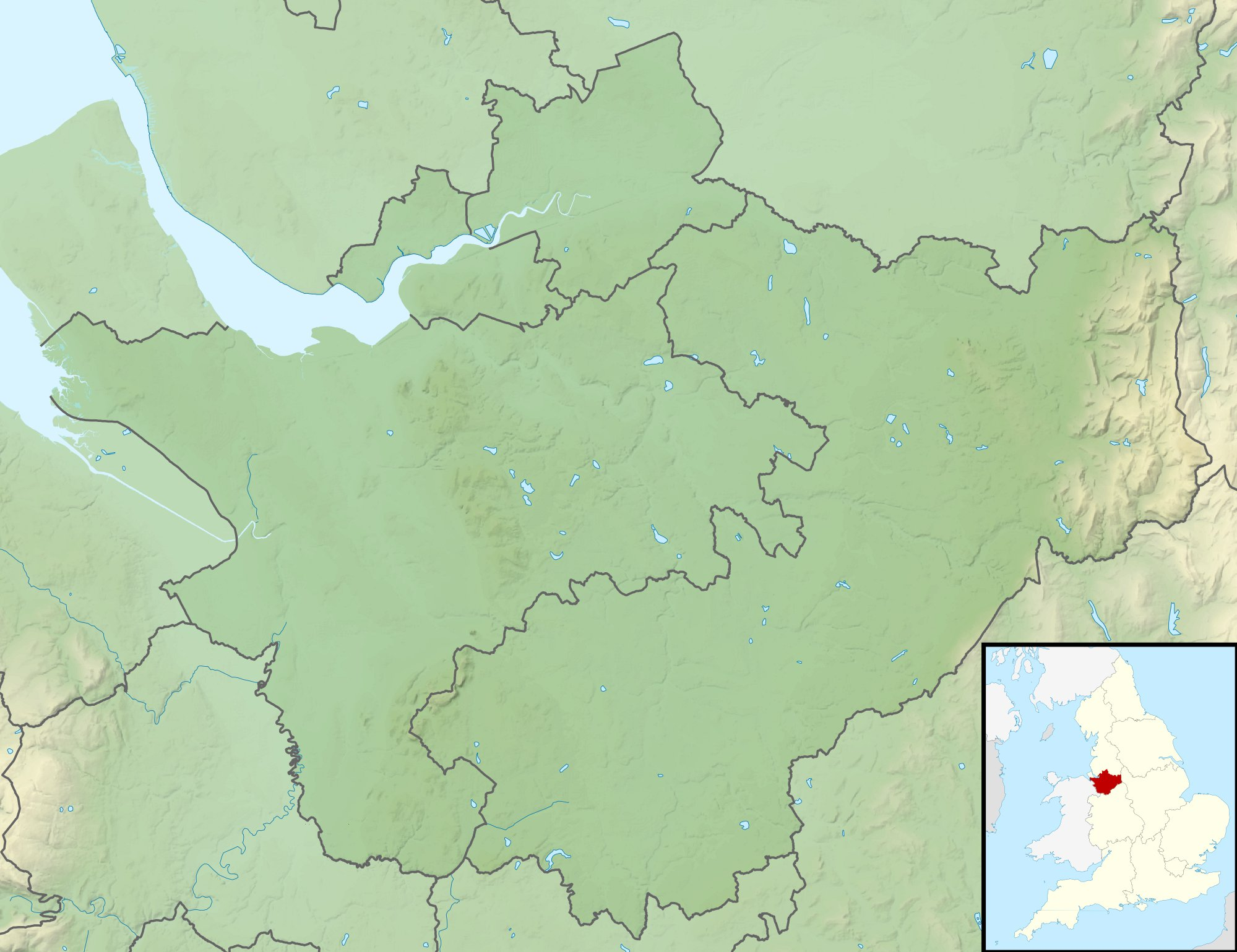
- Location within Cheshire
- Location: Cheshire
- Coordinates: 53.27198°N 2.04345°W
- Type: reservoir
- Primary inflows: River Dean
- Built: 1959
- Max. length: 0.93 km (0.58 miles)
- Max. width: 0.53 km (0.33 miles)
- Surface area: 16.765 hectares (41.43 acres)
- Average depth: 11.365 metres (37.29 feet)
- Water volume: 1,909,000 m^{3} (67,400,000 cu ft)
- Surface elevation: 308 metres (1,010 feet)

Lamaload Reservoir is a reservoir near Rainow, Cheshire, England (SJ972750). It lies in the South West Peak within the Peak District National Park, to the west of the Goyt Valley, and is fed by the River Dean. The reservoir is 0.93 km × 0.53 km, with a capacity of 1,909,000 m³, impounded by a multiple-arch, round-headed buttress dam in concrete, whose design was innovative at the time. It was built by Richard Costain Ltd in 1959–63 to serve Macclesfield, which lies to its west, and officially opened in 1965. The reservoir and associated water treatment works are owned by United Utilities. The area is a popular tourist spot, forming an access point for walkers to the surrounding moorland.

== History ==
Lamaload is first mentioned in 1519, and Lamaload Farm is documented as a mansion house in the late 16th century; it remained an active farm in the 20th century. Three Roman coins were discovered during the excavation of the reservoir.

The idea of a reservoir at Lamaload was first suggested in 1919 by Herbert Lapworth. Plans to construct the reservoir were proposed in 1957 to alleviate water-supply problems of the town of Macclesfield. Lamaload was chosen because it was close to Macclesfield, with a sufficient elevation above the town that gravity would result in water flow without requiring pumping, and had a steeply cut valley with the potential to store a large volume of water. It was the first reservoir to be proposed within a national park; the Peak District was the first of the early tranche of parks, designated in 1951. A public enquiry was held on 26 September 1957; local objections from farmers and representatives of the Peak District National Park focused on whether it was necessary to prohibit habitation and farming, other than of sheep, within the water-catchment area.

Several designs of the dam were initially put forward, including an earth dam (a type of embankment dam), which would have been more expensive. Lamaload Dam was the first all-concrete dam of its type in England; its multiple-arch design was selected in response to geological pressure tests. The architect John A. Strubbe assisted with the design. Richard Costain Ltd was chosen as the contractor. Herbert Lapworth Partners were consulting engineers, including R. C. S. Walters (also involved with dams at Sutton Bingham, Weir Wood, Drift and Stithians Reservoirs), with R. G. Sharp as their on-site engineer. The borough engineer was J. H. Dossett and John Shaw was the project's managing engineer.

Construction of the reservoir and dam commenced in 1959 and was complete in 1963. Lamaload Dam cost £475,000, and the entire project had an estimated budget of £860,000. Initial works included building an access road from Rainow at a cost of £50,000, and diverting the River Dean to allow excavation of the dam's foundations. Concrete was supplied by rail from the Costain Feimert plant. None of the farmhouses in the area were flooded, but several, including Lamaload Farm, were demolished to construct a car park, or were repurposed as service buildings. Supply of water from the reservoir started in 1964, but shortly afterwards one of the water pipes fractured. Princess Alexandra visited and unveiled a plaque on 26 May 1961, during the construction phase, and the reservoir and treatment plant were officially opened on 21 April 1965 by Viscount Leverhulme.

Fishing for trout on the reservoir was permitted from 1970. In 2020, 20 hectares of the woodland was scheduled to be felled after discovery of Phytophthora ramorum at the site.

== Description ==
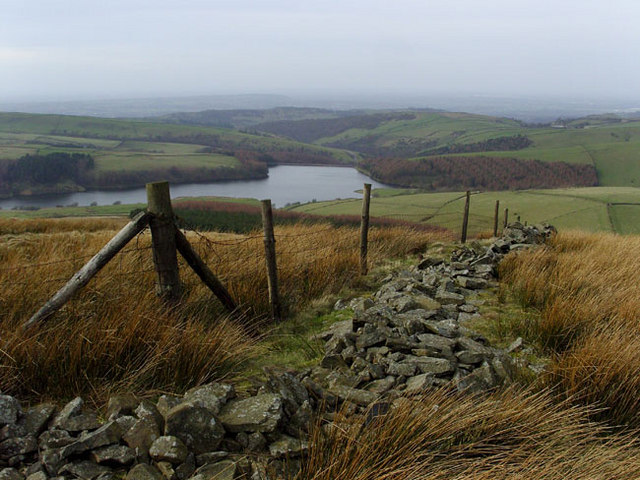
View onto Lamaload Reservoir in 2007

Lamaload Reservoir (SJ972750) is roughly triangular in shape, around 0.93 km long and 0.53 km wide, with its long axis running broadly north–south. It lies 2.3 km southeast of Rainow, 308 metres above sea level, and is fed by the River Dean. The reservoir has a capacity of 1,909,000 m³, with a surface area of 16.765 hectares and a mean depth of 11.365 metres. The dam is at the north-west side. The underlying rock is Millstone grit and shales. The catchment area is 302 hectares. The reservoir is surrounded by moorland, broad-leaved woodland and plantations of larch and pine. The long axis of the reservoir lies parallel and to the west of Hooleyhey Lane; footpaths (Macclesfield Forest Footpaths 12/14/15/30 and Rainow Footpath 62A) connect with Hooleyhey Lane to complete a circuit of the reservoir.

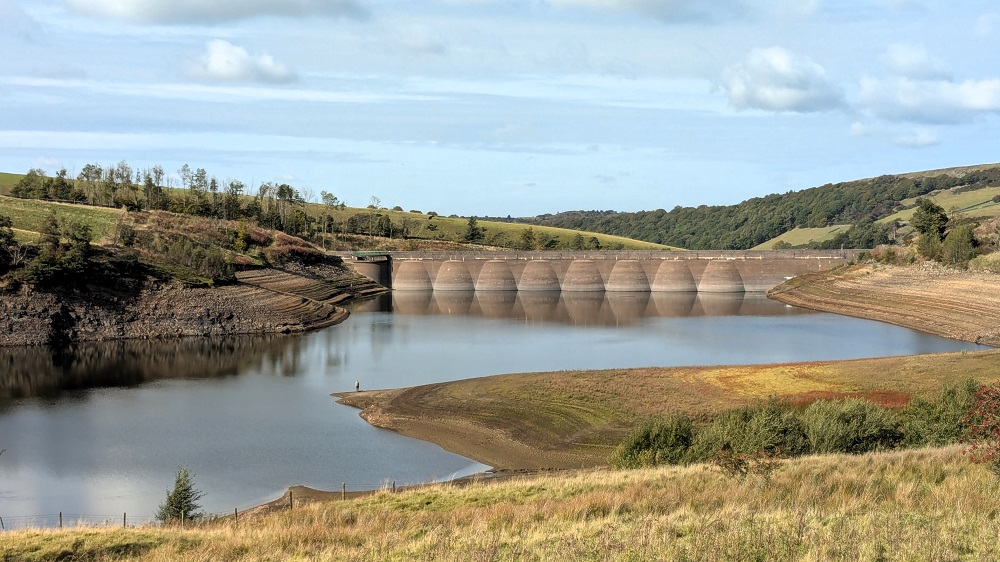
Dam structure visible in 2025

The dam is of a round-headed buttress type construction, a form of gravity dam, 186 metres in width by 38 metres high, with six buttresses with heads around 15 metres wide. The buttresses have a curved profile, and are 46 metres in cross-section at the base, reducing to 2.1 metres at the top. The individual buttresses are separate from each other, to give the foundations a small degree of freedom to shift. The dam was constructed with low-heat cement. The water treatment works are served by Lamaload Road, off the B5470. The daily extraction volume was estimated in 1962 at between 3,400,000 and 6,800,000 litres. The reservoir and associated water treatment works are now owned by United Utilities.

== Recreation ==
Lamaload is used for fishing (membership is managed by Prince Albert Angling Society) and birdwatching. It is among the most popular locations for tourists in the South West Peak, forming an important access point for walkers to the surrounding moorland. It lies on the Tegg's Nose and Dean Valley walk, included in The Independent's top 50 British walks for summer in 2011. Shining Tor, the highest point in Cheshire, and Windgather Rocks are nearby. Birds seen here include flycatchers, nuthatches, treecreepers and woodpeckers. Facilities include a car park (not open all year) and picnic tables.

== Gallery ==
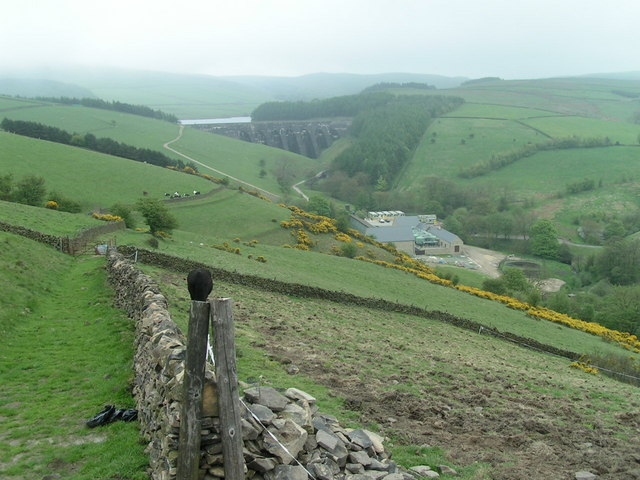
Reservoir, dam and waterworks

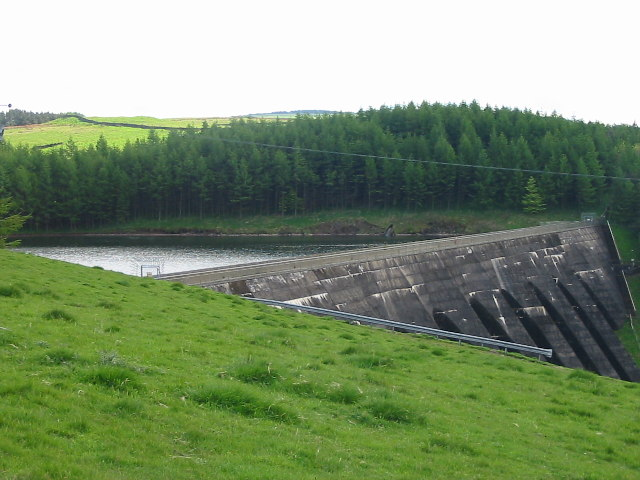
Dam

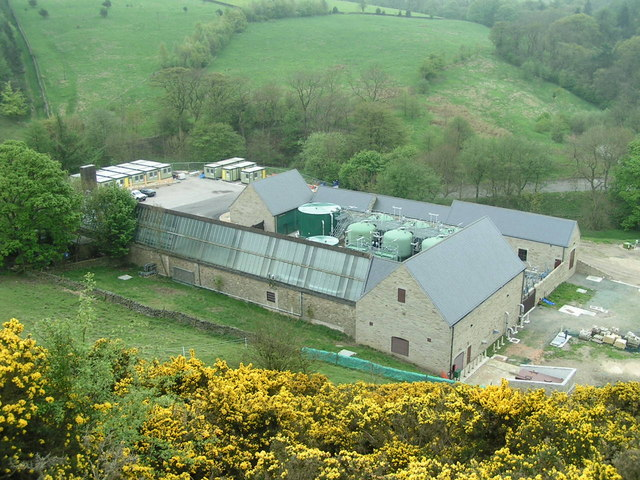
Waterworks

== See also ==
- List of dams and reservoirs in the United Kingdom
- Shira Hydro-Electric Scheme, includes an earlier round-headed buttress dam (1959)
- Clywedog Reservoir, another round-headed buttress dam (1967)
