= Cornwall Birdwatching and Preservation Society =

Conservation body in Cornwall, England

- Company type: Conservation charity
- Founded: 17 January 1931
- Headquarters: Bodmin, Cornwall
- Area served: Cornwall
- Website: www.cbwps.org.uk

The Cornwall BirdWatching and Preservation Society is a conservation body dedicated to the preservation and enjoyment of birds in the county of Cornwall, England, UK. The society is involved in the management of six reserves, and provides news of bird sightings in Cornwall through its website.

== History ==
The CBWPS was formed as a result of an appeal published in the Western Morning News on 3 October 1930. This was followed by a meeting held in Truro on 17 January 1931 chaired by Lt. Col. B. H. Ryves with the aim of creating a society of bird lovers in Cornwall. The proposal was accepted and officers elected, and the first Executive Committee Meeting was held on 6 February and the first General Meeting on 28 March that year.

== Reserves ==
=== Walmsley Sanctuary ===
Walmsley Sanctuary (SW 993746). Near to Wadebridge in the valley of the River Amble. Owned and managed by the society. Walmsley Sanctuary is a members only reserve and there is no access for the general public.

=== Other sanctuaries ===
- Maer Lake (SS 206073). Near Bude. Jointly owned by the society and Cornwall Wildlife Trust.
- Windmill Farm (SW 693152). On the Lizard peninsula. Jointly owned by the society and Cornwall Wildlife Trust.
- Loveny (Colliford Reservoir) (SX 185758). On Bodmin Moor. Jointly owned by the society and Cornwall Wildlife Trust.
- Drift Reservoir (SW431294). Near Penzance. Managed by the Society under a licence agreement with South West Water.
- Stithians Reservoir (SW707372 and SW713350) south of Redruth. Managed by the Society under a licence agreement with South West Water.
