= Charlotte Carew Pole =

British political activist

Lady Carew Pole

Personal details
- Born: Charlotte Louise Campbell Watkins Dorset, England
- Party: Conservative
- Spouse(s): Sir Tremayne John Carew Pole, 14th Baronet
- Children: 2
- Relatives: Sir Richard Carew Pole, 13th Baronet (father-in-law); Mary, Lady Carew Pole (mother-in-law)
- Occupation: political activist

Charlotte Louise Campbell Carew Pole, Lady Carew Pole (née Watkins), is a British women's rights advocate and Conservative political activist. She is the director of Daughters' Rights, a political campaign advocating for the end of male primogeniture in the British peerage and baronetage and for women to have hereditary seats in the House of Lords. Carew Pole is also the director of Women2Win, which campaigns for increasing the number of women Conservative members of parliament in the House of Commons.

== Career ==
Carew Pole joined "The Hares", a political campaign started in 2013 to end male primogeniture, in 2016, and rebranded it as "Daughters' Rights" in 2018. She advocates for daughters to have the same inheritance rights as sons, including inheriting peerages and baronetages, family seats, and seats in the House of Lords. Carew Pole was motivated to join the campaign after giving birth to a daughter following seven miscarriages and two rounds of In vitro fertilisation. Since her daughter cannot inherit the Pole baronetecy, Carew Pole was inspired to push for changing laws regarding inheritance of titles, land, and businesses. In her capacity as director of Daughters' Rights, she serves on the staff of Baroness Jenkin of Kennington in Parliament.

She is one of many aristocratic women, including Lady Kinvara Balfour, Lady Willa Franks, Lady Eliza Dundas, the Honourable Sarah Long, Lady Tanya Field, and the Honourable Hatta Byng, who have advocated for an end to male primogeniture.

Carew Pole is also the director of Women2Win, a Conservative Party organization founded by Theresa May in 2005 to increase the number of women Conservative MPs in the House of Commons.

On 15 March 2021, she spoke on a panel with Baroness D'Souza, Lord Kirkhope of Harrogate, Meg Russell, and Matthew Flinders for the Aspen Institute's webinar The Future of the House of Lords.

In 2023, Carew Pole criticized the Lord Chancellor's decision to recognise Matilda Simon, a transgender woman, as the 3rd Baron Simon of Wythenshawe. Carew Pole argued that, as Lady Simon had transitioned from male to female, the barony should go to her elder sister, the Honourable Margaret Simon. However, Margaret Simon could not have succeeded to the barony even if Matilda had been born female, as the barony can only be inherited by "heirs male of the body"; it would have passed to a male-line cousin of Margaret and Matilda instead.

== Personal life ==
Carew Pole is the daughter of Christopher Watkins, and grew up in Dorset.

She is married to Sir Tremayne John Carew Pole, 14th Baronet, son of Sir Richard Carew Pole, 13th Baronet and Mary Dawnay. They have two children:

- Jemima Nisset Carew Pole (b. 2015)
- Lucian William Patrick Carew Pole (b. 2016)

The family lives at Antony House, the seat of the Carew-Pole family which is now under the ownership of the National Trust.
