= River Dean =

River in Cheshire, England

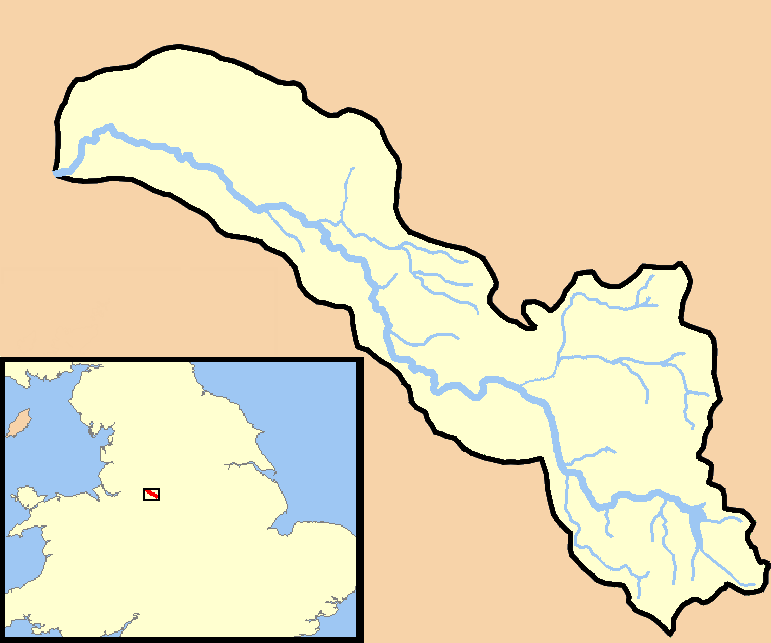
A map showing the River Dean and its tributaries within its catchment area. The direction of water flow is east to west.

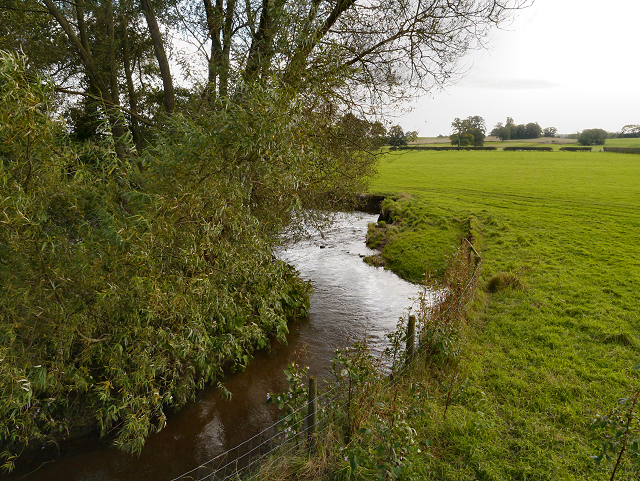
River Dean near Prestbury in 2012

The River Dean rises at Longclough in Macclesfield Forest on the western edge of the Peak District foothills above the village of Rainow in north east Cheshire, England.

Together with a number of tributary streams it is impounded by the dam at Lamaload Reservoir. The river flows on to and passes through the village of Rainow, the town of Bollington, through the fields between Whiteley Green and Butley Town, Prestbury, on through the grounds of Adlington Hall, thence to Deanwater, Handforth, and finally it joins the River Bollin between Wilmslow and Styal.

Below the dam, there is a waterworks owned and managed by United Utilities. The water stored in Lamaload Reservoir is used to supply Rainow, Bollington and other places. Next to the road bridge in Rainow village can be seen the early 20th century waterworks built by Bollington Urban District Council. Shortly after passing Rainow, the river flows north down the two-mile-long Ingersley Vale with Kerridge Hill to its western side. It is soon joined by the stream from Hayles Clough which rises to the east above Ginclough. From Ingersley Vale, the river finds its way through Bollington, out of the hills and into the Cheshire Plain at Lowerhouse (part of Bollington).

The historically notable section of these streams is between Ginclough and Lowerhouse. This length supported many early watermills and is recognised as one of the earliest developments in the English Industrial Revolution on the western side of the Pennines. Some of the mills are described on the Bollington page.
