= Sir John Carew Pole, 12th Baronet =

British landowner, politician and soldier (1902–1993)

Sir John Carew Pole, 12th Bt. KStJ DSO TD

Lord Lieutenant of Cornwall
- In office 1962–1977
- Monarch: Elizabeth II
- Preceded by: Sir Edward Bolitho
- Succeeded by: The Viscount Falmouth

High Sheriff of Cornwall
- In office 1947–1947

Chairman of Cornwall County Council
- In office 1952–1963

Personal details
- Born: John Gawen Pole-Carew; 4 March 1902
- Died: 26 October 1993 (aged 91)
- Spouses: Cynthia Mary Burns (m. 1928; died 1977) Joan Fulford (m. 1979)
- Children: Elizabeth Mary Carew Pole; Caroline Anne Carew Pole; Sir Richard Carew Pole, 13th Baronet
- Parent(s): Sir Reginald Pole-Carew; Lady Beatrice
- Relatives: James Butler, 3rd Marquess of Ormonde and Lady Elizabeth Harriet Grosvenor (maternal grandparents)
- Education: Royal Military College, Sandhurst
- Awards: Distinguished Service Order; KStJ

Military service
- Branch/service: British Army
- Years of service: 1923–1947
- Rank: Colonel
- Unit: Coldstream Guards; Duke of Cornwall's Light Infantry
- Battles/wars: 1936–1939 Arab revolt in Palestine; Normandy campaign; North-West Europe 1944–45

Sir John Gawen Carew Pole, 12th Baronet (4 March 1902 – 26 January 1993), was a Cornish landowner, soldier and politician. He was Chairman of Cornwall County Council from 1952 to 1963 and Lord Lieutenant of Cornwall from 1962 to 1977, briefly serving in both roles simultaneously. He was also a member of the Honourable Corps of Gentlemen at Arms from 1950 to 1972.

His name until 1926 was John Gawen Pole-Carew.

== Early life ==
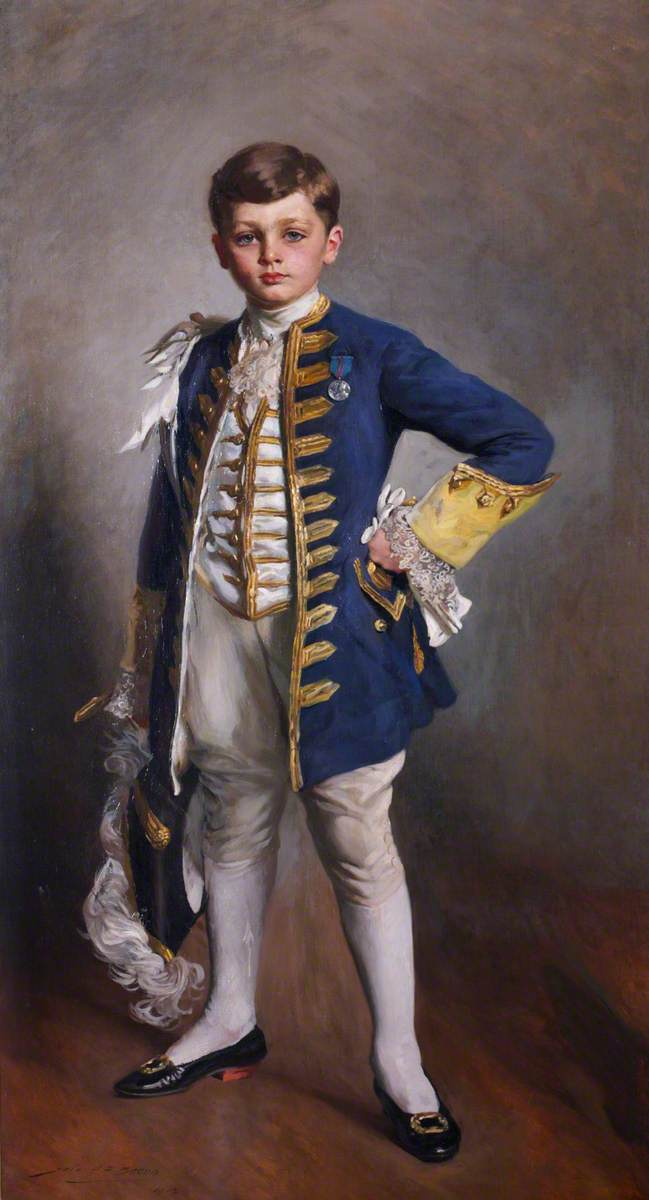
Carew Pole as a pageboy in around 1911, by John Henry Frederick Bacon

John Gawen Carew Pole was the elder son of Lieutenant-General Sir Reginald Pole-Carew and Lady Beatrice Butler, a daughter of James Butler, 3rd Marquess of Ormonde and Lady Elizabeth Harriet Grosvenor. Through his maternal grandmother he was a great-grandson of Hugh Grosvenor, 1st Duke of Westminster, and a great-great grandson of Royal favourite Harriet Sutherland-Leveson-Gower, Duchess of Sutherland.

Carew Pole was educated at Eton College and the Royal Military College, Sandhurst. He served as a page to the Private Secretary to the Sovereign, Francis Knollys, 1st Viscount Knollys at the Coronation of King George V and Queen Mary in 1911.

== Inheritance and estates ==
=== Baronetcy and the Shute Estate ===
Following the death of his fifth-cousin, Sir Frederick de la Pole, 11th Bt, John succeeded as the Pole Baronet of Shute House. Sir John, as he was known from then on, and his predecessor Sir Frederick were both descendants of Sir John Pole, 3rd Bt (1649 - 1708).

As a result of his inheritance, Sir John legally charged his surname from Pole Carew to Carew Pole in 1926; for the remainder of his life he was styled as Sir John Carew Pole, 12th Bt.

Under the terms of Sir Frederick de la Pole's will, the seat of the Baronets, Shute House in Shute, Devon was to be placed in a trust for John, with a remainder to his male heirs. In addition to the early-Georgian Shute House, the estate contained Old Shute House, Haddon House, and 4,339 acres spread across the Parishes of Shute, Colyton and Southleigh. George Cokayne's 1900 edition of the Complete Baronetage records that in 1883 the family estates of the Baronetcy comprised 5,846 acres in Devon yielding £7,416 annually, as well as a minor landholding in Berkshire yielding £337 annually.

Sir Frederick also bequeathed his residuary personal estate to the Trust which the Shute Estate was held in; the total value had been proved at a gross value of £153,915 for probate, with a net value of £61,745. Sir John lived at Shute House until c. 1928; he had vacated the property by early 1929 owing to the costs of death duties on the 11th Baronet's estate as well as the ongoing depression in income from agriculture.

An auction of the entire Shute Estate was held on 16 October 1929; the auctioneer reportedly suggested an opening bid of £100,000 for the entire estate, but no bids were forthcoming. Various minor holdings, farms and fishing rights were sold for a total of £13,140. Many of the historic portraits hung at Shute were subsequently transferred to Sir John's main residence Antony House, Cornwall in 1930, and Shute House was subsequently let and used as a school until the mid-1950s. Following the closure of the school Sir John sold Shute House in 1956; advertisements for the sale published in the Daily Telegraph in September 1956 stated that the estate then comprised 1,111 acres, with an annual rental income of £2,425. The Medieval Old Shute House was not included in the sale of the Shute Estate, and Sir John subsequently gifted this property to the National Trust.

=== Antony House, Cornwall ===
Following his father's death in 1924, John inherited Antony House in Cornwall, which became his primary residence for the remainder of his life. In 1961 he gifted Antony, along with 29 acres of surrounding gardens and parkland to the National Trust; he retained ownership of the House's contents, along with the right for his family and descendants to occupy the House. As part of the transfer to the National Trust, a restrictive covenant was placed to preserve a further 121 acres of surrounding parkland; he also transferred two neighbouring farm to the Trust to provide an endowment for the house's upkeep - the 281-acre Tregantle Farm and the 400-acre Erth Barton Farm.

== Career ==
=== Soldier ===
Carew Pole served in the Coldstream Guards from 1923 to 1939, during which time he served Aide-de-camp to the Commander-in-Chief in India in 1924–25

In 1936 he served in Palestine during the Arab revolt, and commanded the 5th Battalion the Duke of Cornwall's Light Infantry (a Territorial Army unit) from 1939 to 1943, then commanded the 2nd Battalion the Devonshire Regiment, from July 1944, during Operation Overlord.

He was awarded the Distinguished Service Order for his conduct on 11 August 1944 at Les Forges, Normandy, when “throughout the long day he was always in the forefront of the battle”, personally directing the advance under accurate anti-tank fire.

After the war he raised and commanded the 4th/5th Battalion, Duke of Cornwall’s Light Infantry (Territorial Army), later becoming its honorary colonel. He also held the Territorial Decoration. He was a Gentleman of HM Bodyguard of the Honourable Corps of Gentlemen-at-Arms, from 1950 to 1972, and Prime Warden of the Worshipful Company of Fishmongers for 1969–70. He was appointed a Knight of the Most Venerable Order of the Hospital of St. John of Jerusalem (KStJ) in February 1972.

=== Local government and business ===
Carew-Pole sat as a magistrate from 1939 and served for many years on the Cornwall County Council, becoming its chairman from 1952 to 1963. He was appointed Vice-Lieutenant of Cornwall from 1950 to 1962, and served as Lord Lieutenant of Cornwall from 1962 to 1977.

He also held a number of public and business appointments, including chairman of the Devon and Cornwall committee of Lloyds Bank, vice-chairman of the South-Western Electricity Consultative Council, a directorship of English China Clays, and membership of the Western Area Board of the British Transport Commission.

== Personal life ==
On 12 June 1928, Carew Pole married Cynthia Mary Burns, the daughter of art collector Walter Burns of North Mymms Park, Hertfordshire.

Cynthia's father Walter Spencer Morgan Burns was member of the American Morgan Banking Family; through his mother, he was a nephew of J. P. Morgan and grandson of Junius Spencer Morgan; Walter was also the brother of Mary Harcourt, Viscountess Harcourt who had married British Cabinet Minister Lewis Harcourt, 1st Viscount Harcourt.

Cynthia's mother Ruth Evelyn Cavendish-Bentinck was the daughter of William George Cavendish-Bentinck and Elizabeth Livingston, of the prominent Livingston family of New York. Ruth was a first-cousin of the 8th Duke and 9th Duke of Portland, and a third-cousin of the 7th Duke of Portland and Queen Elizabeth the Queen Mother.

The marriage produced one son and two daughters:

- Elizabeth Mary Carew Pole (1929–2021), who married David Cuthbert Tudway Quilter (1921–2007), grandson of Sir Cuthbert Quilter, 1st Baronet (1841–1911), and nephew of Sir Cuthbert Quilter, 2nd Baronet, and Roger Quilter
- Caroline Anne Carew Pole (1933–2018), who married The Hon. Paul Asquith (1927–1984), the son of Cyril Asquith, Baron Asquith of Bishopstone
- Sir John Richard Walter Reginald Carew Pole, 13th Baronet (1938–2024), who married Mary Dawnay, a granddaughter of Charles Grey, 5th Earl Grey

Cynthia Carew Pole was also the only sibling of Major General Sir George Burns; following Burns' death in 1997, the North Mymms Park estate was inherited by her son Sir Richard Carew Pole (although Sir George had sold the main house in 1979).

In 1979, after his first wife's death in 1977, Carew Pole married Joan Fulford, the widow of Lt-Colonel Anthony Fulford.

=== Paintings ===
In 1911, as a nine-year old, he had his portrait painted by John Henry Frederick Bacon showing Pole as a pageboy for George V's coronation on 22 June 1911.

In 1985, he had his portrait painted by Peter Kuhfeld, currently on loan to the National Trust, Antony.

Honorary titles
Preceded by Sir Edward Bolitho	Lord Lieutenant of Cornwall; 1962–1977	Succeeded by The Viscount Falmouth
Baronetage of England
Preceded by Frederick de la Pole	Baronet of Shute House; 1926–1993	Succeeded by Richard Carew Pole
