= Maer Lake =

Nature reserve in Cornwall, UK

- Location within Cornwall
- Location: near Bude grid reference SS 208 075
- Coordinates: 50°50′21″N 4°32′47″W
- Area: 8.9 hectares (22 acres)
- Operator: Cornwall Wildlife Trust and Cornwall Birdwatching and Preservation Society
- Website: www.cornwallwildlifetrust.org.uk/nature-reserves/maer-lake

Maer Lake is a nature reserve adjacent to Bude, in Cornwall, England. It is a wetland meadow with open water, and is an important site for over-wintering birds.

== Description ==
The earliest mention of the lake is in 1284, as "La Mare", and in the post-medieval period it was an area of wet grazing shared by local farmers. In 1993 the site was jointly purchased by the Cornwall Wildlife Trust and the Cornwall Birdwatching and Preservation Society, and it is managed by the two organisations.

The area of the site is 8.9 hectares (22 acres). It is a freshwater wetland, and a wetland meadow for grazing animals; it is an important as a passage site and as an over-wintering site for waders and wildfowl. A sluice was constructed so that there would be permanent shallow flooding of the site; 1 to 6 hectares (2.5 to 14.8 acres) may lie under water. The permanent shallow water has created a thick silt which is beneficial for waders.

Species seen on the site include golden plover, wigeon, jack snipe, lapwing, dunlin, redwing, water rail, marsh harrier and black-tailed godwit. About 1 hectare (2.5 acres) is covered with yellow flag iris and marsh marigold; there is also bog bean and pink water-speedwell.

Access is restricted, to give security to resident and visiting birds: viewing is permitted only from the lane above the reserve.
