= Anne Jenkin, Baroness Jenkin of Kennington =

British life peer (born 1955)

The Right Honourable The Baroness Jenkin of Kennington
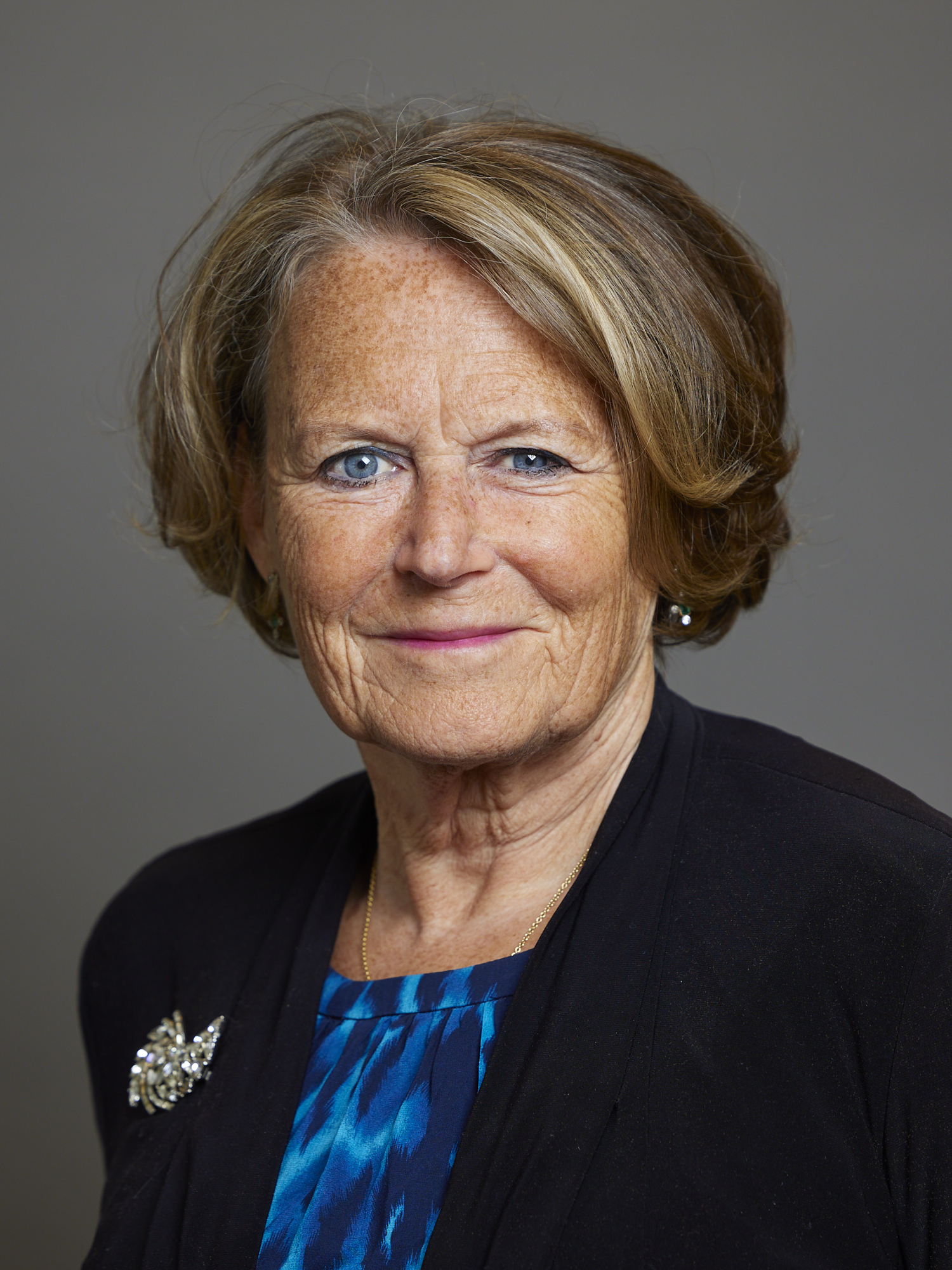
- Official portrait, 2024

Member of the House of Lords
- Lord Temporal
- Life peerage 26 January 2011

Personal details
- Born: Anne Caroline Strutt; 8 December 1955 (age 70)
- Party: Conservative
- Spouse: Bernard Jenkin (m. 1988; div. 2022)
- Relations: Robert Strutt, 4th Baron Rayleigh (paternal grandfather)
- Children: 2
- Parent(s): Hon. Charles Strutt; Hon. Jean Davidson

Anne Caroline Jenkin, Baroness Jenkin of Kennington (née Strutt; born 8 December 1955) is a Conservative member of the House of Lords.

== Political career ==
Jenkin stood for election as a Member of Parliament in Glasgow Provan in the 1987 general election. In 2005, she co-founded Women2Win with Theresa May, a campaign to increase the number of female Conservative MPs. She is currently its co-chair with Mark Harper. She hired the director of Women2Win, Charlotte Carew Pole, to serve on her parliamentary staff.

She co-founded the Conservative Friends of International Development in 2011.

She was created a life peer on 26 January 2011 as Baroness Jenkin of Kennington, of Hatfield Peverel in the County of Essex. She was introduced to the House of Lords on 27 January 2011, where she sits on the Conservative benches.

In 2013, she spoke in favour of equal marriage.

In 2014, she was a member of the all-party parliamentary group on Food Poverty and Hunger when it co-produced a report on food poverty, with the charity Feeding Britain. One of the report's findings was that there were 4 million people in the UK struggling to afford food. At the publication press conference on 8 December, she said that the report found that one cause of the rise of hunger and food bank use in the UK was because, "We [as a society] have lost a lot of our cooking skills, and poor people don't know how to cook." Later that day, in another interview about the report's launch, she apologised for the remark, saying she was speaking without a script and had made a mistake: "What I meant was as a society we have lost our ability to cook" which was a problem affecting low income families most severely.

In January 2018, Jenkin criticised what she claimed was language used by constituents to describe candidates during the 2017 general election. In the debate on social media regulation in the House of Lords, Jenkin claimed that Joy Morrissey, who was standing as the Conservative candidate for Ealing Central and Acton, had been referred to as a "fucking Tory cunt". Jenkin said: "During the election campaign in June, the Ealing Central and Acton Conservative candidate was met daily outside her home by a large group of Momentum and Labour activists yelling at her, and I quote—and please, my Lords, forgive the unparliamentary language and block your ears if you are sensitive or easily offended—“Fucking Tory cunt”. My lords, this young woman has a young child. How can this be acceptable?". Morrissey was elected as the Conservative MP for Beaconsfield at the 2019 general election.

As of 2022, Jenkin is a member of parliamentary committees on Intergenerational Fairness and Provision (since 2018) and Hybrid Instruments (since 2019). She has previously served on committees addressing Equality Act 2010 and Disability (2015–2016) and Charities (2016–2017).

In 2021, perceiving a conflict between rights of "trans-women and those of women and girls", Jenkin dissociated herself from recent stances of Stonewall, a charity she had previously supported, and declared herself "gender critical". In 2022, The Daily Telegraph reported that, with fellow "gender critical" parliamentarians Rosie Duffield and Joanna Cherry she was setting up a cross-party "biology policy unit", "to help ensure policies across the public sector that are based on gender identity theory are documented and scrutinised". In 2023, she criticized the Lord Chancellor's decision to recognise Matilda Simon, a transgender woman, as the 3rd Baron Simon of Wythenshawe.

== Other roles ==
In 2016, Jenkin became founding chancellor of Writtle University College, on its achieving university college status. The college is in Essex and specialises in agricultural and horticultural courses.

In 2017, Jenkin was chair of the Centre for Social Justice Off the Scales working group on childhood obesity in England.

== Personal life ==
Since 1988, she has been married to the Conservative Member of Parliament Sir Bernard Jenkin, whose father was the Conservative life peer The Lord Jenkin of Roding. Jenkin and her husband have two sons.

She separated from her husband in 2023.
