= Cabilla and Redrice Woods =

Nature reserve in Cornwall, England

- Location within Cornwall
- Interactive map of Cabilla and Redrice Woods
- Location: near Bodmin
- OS grid: SX 1466
- Coordinates: 50°27′51″N 4°37′20″W
- Area: 77 hectares (190 acres)
- Operator: Cornwall Wildlife Trust
- Website: www.cornwallwildlifetrust.org.uk/nature-reserves/cabilla-redrice-woods

Cabilla and Redrice Woods is a nature reserve of the Cornwall Wildlife Trust, about 3 miles (4.8 km) east of Bodmin, in Cornwall, England. It is an extensive area of mixed woodland.

== Description ==
The area of the reserve is 77 hectares (190 acres). There is a walking trail that takes in various features of the woodland. It includes some steep inclines.

Features in Cabilla Wood include centuries-old coppiced woodland, where species have evolved life cycles dependent on coppicing; a pond, habitat of amphibians, dragonflies and other insects; a large adit of a disused mine, home of the greater and lesser horseshoe bat; an alder coppice; and a building of East Wheal Jane, a former lead and silver mine.

Redrice Wood, east of Cabilla Wood across a stream, consists mostly of sessile oak coppice. There are charcoal burning platforms where, from medieval times to the late 18th century, coppiced oak was converted to charcoal. There is an oak plantation of timber trees. The blue ground beetle, found in few places in Britain, is seen in Redrice Wood.
