= Women2Win =

Women2Win is a mentoring and pressure group within the British Conservative Party that promotes the election of more Conservative women MPs and increased involvement of Conservative women in public life.

Women2Win was founded in 2005 by Theresa May (who subsequently became Prime Minister and later Baroness May of Maidenhead) and by Anne Jenkin (who became Baroness Jenkin of Kennington). In 2018, Theresa May launched Women2WinWales at the Welsh Conservative Party Conference, launching the campaign to elect the first female Welsh Conservative MP. Charlotte Carew Pole serves as the director.

When Women2Win was founded there were 17 Conservative women MPs (9% of the parliamentary party) and by 2018 this had increased to 67 (20%); the work of Women2Win and of Theresa May in particular have been credited for contributing to this trend.
