= Ventongimps =

Hamlet in Cornwall, England, United Kingdom

Coordinates: 50.3214°N 5.1192°W

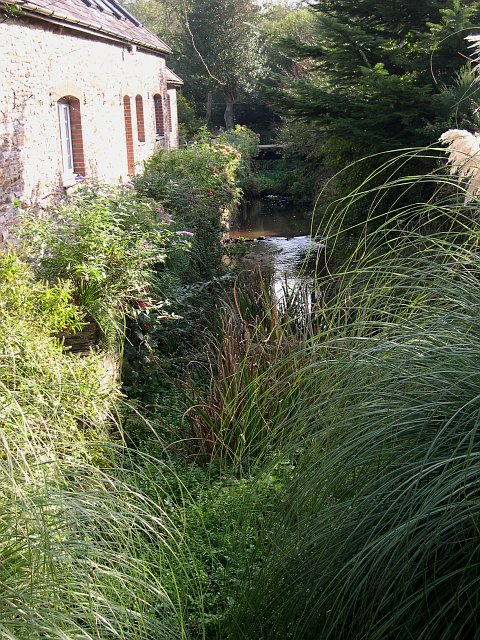
Ventongimps Mill and stream

Ventongimps is a hamlet in mid Cornwall, United Kingdom. The hamlet is located within Perranzabuloe civil parish, 5 miles (8.0 km) north-northwest of the city of Truro. Ventongimps Moor nature reserve is located to the south of the hamlet.
