= Sylvia's Meadow =

Nature reserve in East Cornwall, England

- Site of Special Scientific Interest
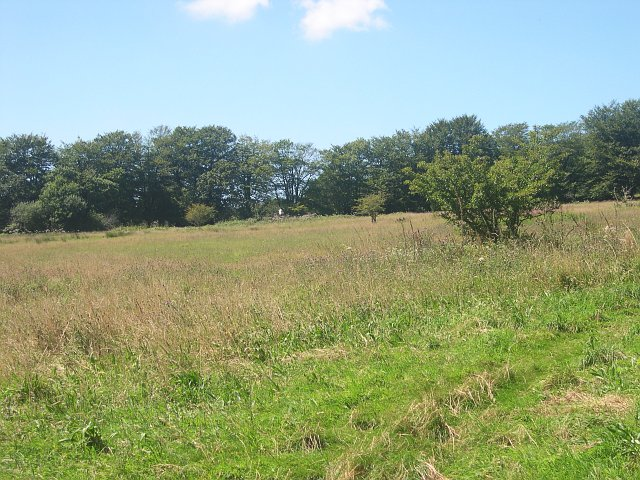
- Sylvia's Meadow in summer

- Location within Cornwall Location within England
- Location of Sylvia's Meadow.
- Area of search: Cornwall
- Grid reference: SX435591
- Coordinates: 50.5153°N 4.2406°W
- Interest: Biological
- Area: 4.46 hectares (0.0446 km^{2}; 0.0172 sq mi)
- Notification date: 1992

Sylvia's Meadow is a nature reserve and a Site of Special Scientific Interest owned and managed by Cornwall Wildlife Trust. It is a herb rich, 5-hectare (12-acre) site situated near Gunnislake, in East Cornwall, England.

== History ==
During World War II, a US military camp was situated in Sylvia's Meadow, which housed only white American armed forces personnel. Black American airmen were billeted in an adjacent field. Since then, the land has been left unploughed and unimproved. In this respect, Sylvia's Meadow is virtually unique to Cornwall.

The meadow was designated a Site of Special Scientific Interest in 1992.

The reserve is named after a previous owner's daughter.

== Flora and fauna ==
Sylvia's Meadow is an example of unimproved herb-rich pasture land containing some rare plant species. It is famed for the orchids that grow there, which include the lesser butterfly orchid and heath spotted orchid. Other species found here include: autumn ladies'-tresses, sneezewort, yellow rattle and bird's foot trefoil.

Butterflies that may be seen include wall, orange tip, dingy skipper and the common blue. Reptile sightings include the common lizard and the slow worm.
