= Ventongimps Moor =

Nature reserve in Cornwall, England

- Site of Special Scientific Interest
- Location within Cornwall Location within England
- Location of Ventongimps Moor.
- Area of search: Cornwall
- Grid reference: SW781510
- Coordinates: 50.3181°N 5.1181°W
- Interest: Biological
- Area: 8.2 hectares (0.082 km^{2}; 0.032 sq mi)
- Notification date: 1951

Ventongimps Moor is a moorland nature reserve and Site of Special Scientific Interest (SSSI), noted for its biological characteristics, in mid Cornwall, England, United Kingdom. The site, important for the occurrence of the plant Dorset heath, was the first reserve to be purchased by the Cornwall Wildlife Trust.

== History ==
The moor was mentioned in 1311, being called "Funtenvaes", meaning well or spring.

Ventongimps Moor was the first nature reserve to be bought by the newly founded Cornwall Wildlife Trust in 1966. The site was spotted by a Trust volunteer, Dr Frank Smith, and purchased because it was under threat from intensive agriculture activities.

A Second World War bomber was discovered on the site in 1977 and subsequently removed for restoration, leaving behind a new pond on the moor.

== Geography ==
The 8.2-hectare (20-acre) SSSI, notified in 1951, is located within Perranzabuloe civil parish, near the hamlet of Ventongimps, 5 miles (8.0 km) north-west of the city of Truro.

The nature reserve is currently owned and managed by the Cornwall Wildlife Trust.

== Wildlife and ecology ==
The moor's predominant habitat is wet dwarf shrub heath, although others include bogland, marshland, mixed deciduous woodland and open water. The Cornwall Wildlife Trust utilises periodic burning and partial removal of scrub to manage the site.

Of particular interest to the site are two Red Data Book plants, Dorset Heath (Erica ciliaris) and Cornish eyebright (Euphrasia vigursii). Other flora found on the site include Cornish Moneywort (Sibthorpia europaea), the hybrid heath 'Dawn' (Erica x watsonii), Hay-scented Buckler Fern (Dryopteris aemula), Wavy-leaved St John's Wort (Hypericum undulatum), Yellow Bartsia (Parentucellia viscosa) and Yellow Centaury (Cicendia filiformis).

The nationally rare Scarce Blue-tailed Damselfly (Ischnura pumilio) is one of the 13 species of dragonfly and damselfly that the ponds on the moor supports. The site also supports 99 recorded species of Lepidoptera.
