= Armstrong Wood =

Nature reserve in Cornwall

- Location within Cornwall
- Interactive map of Armstrong Wood
- Location: near Launceston
- Nearest city: Plymouth
- OS grid: SX 320773
- Coordinates: 50.571226°N 4.373821°W
- Area: 9 hectares (22 acres)
- Operator: Cornwall Wildlife Trust
- Website: www.cornwallwildlifetrust.org.uk/nature-reserves/Armstrong-Wood

Armstrong Wood is a 9 hectare, woodland and nature reserve located south of the village of Trebullett and Launceston, Cornwall managed by the Cornwall Wildlife Trust (CWT). The site is not open to the public and is permit only. The site is noted for the presence of silver-washed fritillary, butterfly and otters.

== Bibliography ==
- Taylor, Sean R. (2002). Armstrong Wood. A Report to the Cornwall Wildlife Trust (Report). Truro: Cornwall Archaeological Unit.
