= Loggans Moor =

Nature reserve in Cornwall, England

Coordinates: 50.2014°N 5.3972°W

Loggans Moor is a nature reserve and Site of Special Scientific Interest, noted for its biological characteristics, in west Cornwall, England, UK. It is located 1 mile north-east of the town of Hayle, off the A30 road.

The 11-hectare (27-acre) nature reserve is owned by Cornwall Wildlife Trust.
