= Baker's Pit Nature Reserve =

Nature reserve in Cornwall

Coordinates: 50.165°N 5.530°W

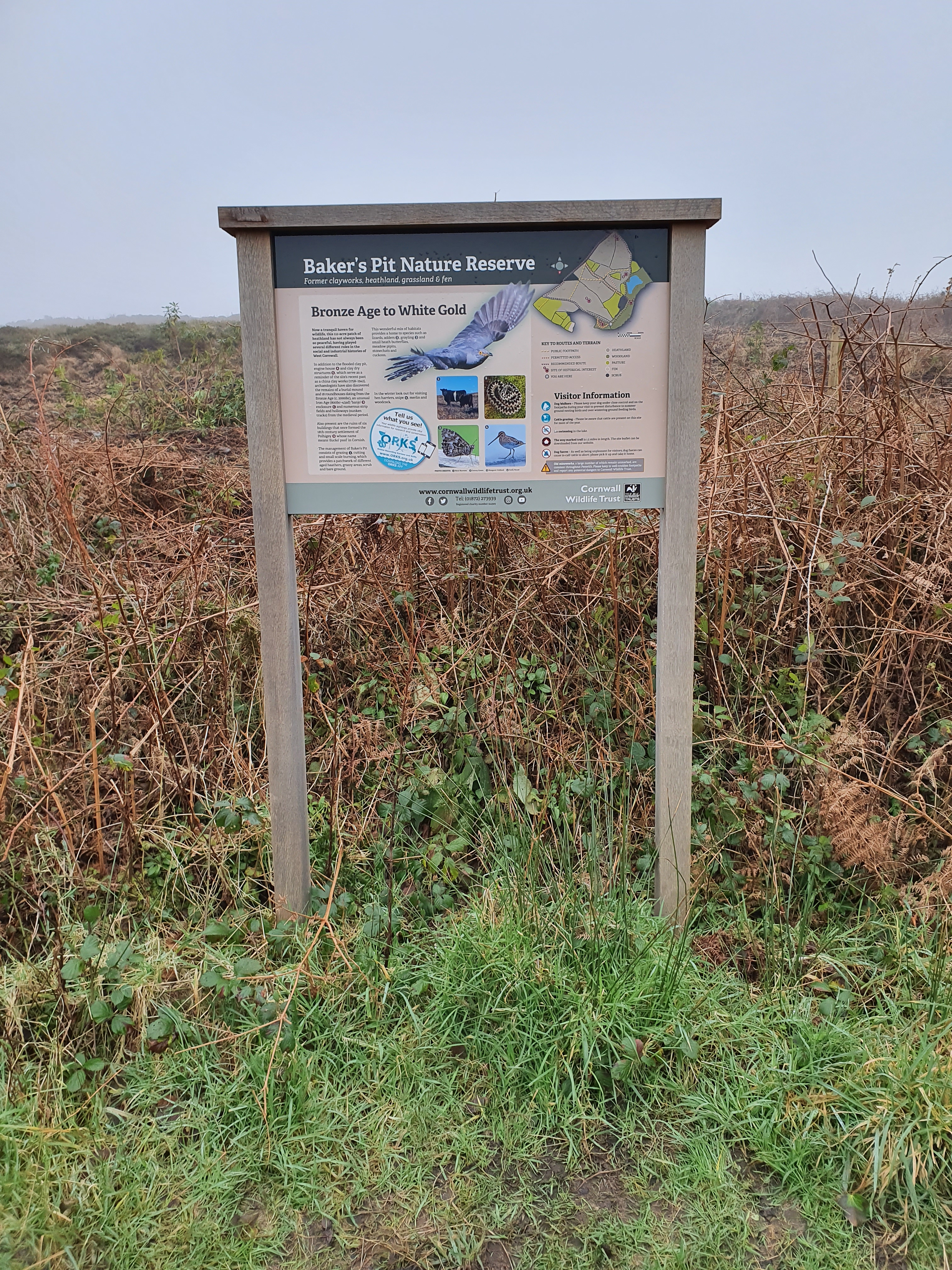
- Baker's Pit Nature Reserve information board

- Location within Cornwall
- OS grid reference: SW 480355
- Unitary authority: Cornwall
- Ceremonial county: Cornwall
- Region: South West
- Country: England
- Sovereign state: United Kingdom
- Post town: PENZANCE
- Postcode district: TR
- Dialling code: 01736
- Police: Devon and Cornwall
- Fire: Cornwall
- Ambulance: South Western
- UK Parliament: St Ives

Baker's Pit Nature Reserve is a nature reserve and former china clay quarry in the parish of Ludgvan, west Cornwall managed by the Cornwall Wildlife Trust (CWT). The reserve is on the moorland of Noon Diggery and is south of the Castle-an-Dinas hillfort and Roger's Tower, a folly built within the hillfort. Within the reserve is a distinctively shaped enclosure with a funnel-like entrance resembling a banjo enclosure, which is an Iron Age ritual site found mostly in Wessex and south-east England; it is the only known one in Cornwall.

== Geography ==
Bakers Pit is a 45 ha nature reserve managed by the Cornwall Wildlife Trust, on moorland known as Noon Diggery, on the eastern edge of the granite uplands of West Penwith. The nearest village is Nancledra and the reserve is approximately mid-way between the towns of Penzance and St Ives. On the southern boundary is the Castle-an Dinas quarry, and Roger's Tower, a folly built on an Iron Age hillfort. The granite is fine grained and is quarried and used mostly as aggregate; in its kaolinised state it was mined at Baker's Pit. The reserve is on a plateau and slopes gently to the south-east with little shelter from the south-westerly prevailing winds.

There is no onsite parking and access is via minor roads off the B3311, or via footpaths.

== History ==
The upland areas of West Penwith are known for the surviving prehistoric and medieval features in the landscape, which include ritual, settlement and pastoral components. They have a degree of preservation unparalleled in the British Isles. A 1979–80 field survey by the Cornwall Committee for Rescue Archaeology (CCRA), on the moorland of Noon Diggery, found the remains of ten field systems, eight of which are within the Baker Pit nature reserve and another three were found by the National Mapping Programme. Dates of pre-historic field boundaries can range from the Bronze Age to Romano-British in date. Also within the reserve is an early Bronze Age barrow which is visible on the skyline and are the main focus of a settlement; barrows usually date from 2000 to 1600 BC. There are other low, stony mounds nearby, which may also be ritual monuments.

The site is first mentioned by Borlase in 1748, making it one of the earliest china clay workings in Cornwall. In the Kelly's Directory of 1873, an extensive china clay work and quarry, belonging to Mr Baker of Amalveor is recorded, and extensive works are also mentioned twenty years later in the 1893 edition. It ceased work as a quarry in the 1930s with much of the industrial infrastructure remaining in place.

The land was donated to the CWT by Imerys in 2000 as "a millennium gift", with the transfer conducted by Andrew George, the MP for St Ives.

== Bibliography ==
- Taylor, Sean R (2002). Baker's Pit. An Archaeological and Historic Landscape Assessment. A Report to the Cornwall Wildlife Trust (Report). Truro: Cornwall Archaeological Unit.
