= Sir Richard Carew Pole, 13th Baronet =

British aristocrat (1938–2024)

Sir John Richard Walter Reginald Carew Pole, 13th Baronet, OBE, DL (2 December 1938 – 1 December 2024) was a British aristocrat who was a holder of the Pole baronetcy, granted to his ancestor by King Charles I in 1628. He lived at Antony House in Cornwall, and succeeded his father, Sir John Gawen Carew Pole, 12th Baronet, in 1993.

== Biography ==
Carew Pole was born in his family's home estate of Antony in Cornwall (which his father gifted to the National Trust in 1961). He attended Eton College followed by the Royal Agricultural College. He then trained as a chartered surveyor and worked for Cornwall County Council for 20 years.

Carew Pole was a Deputy Lieutenant for the county of Cornwall, an Officer of the Order of the British Empire, a Trustee of the Tate Gallery after being very important in the founding of Tate St Ives, the Pilgrim Trust, and the Eden Project during its foundation, a Governor of Gresham's School, Holt, and President of the Cornwall Gardens Trust.

He was High Sheriff of Cornwall for 1978 and was a past Prime Warden of the Worshipful Company of Fishmongers. He was a keen gardener and member of several Royal Horticultural Society committees until he became the president of the RHS from 2001 until 2006. He aimed to spread the RHS over more of the UK, initially by merging with the Northern Horticultural Society and then developing RHS Garden Harlow Carr. He was very active in raising money to support the RHS. He also started more awards for community gardening and more art exhibitions in the gardens. He received the society's Victoria Medal of Honour in 2007.

In 1974 he married Mary Dawnay, a Lady-in-Waiting to Anne, Princess Royal, who served as President of the Royal Cornwall Show. They had two sons:

- Sir Tremayne John Carew Pole, 14th Baronet (b. 1974), who married Charlotte Louise Campbell Watkins and had children.
- John Alexander George Carew Pole (b. 1975), who married Rebecca Wood in 2003 and had children.

Sir Richard Carew Pole died at home in Cornwall, on 1 December 2024, one day shy of his 86th birthday.

Baronetage of England
Preceded by John Carew Pole	Baronet of Shute House; 1993–2024	Succeeded by Tremayne John Carew Pole
