= Rainow =

Village in Cheshire, England

Coordinates: 53°16′59″N 2°04′34″W

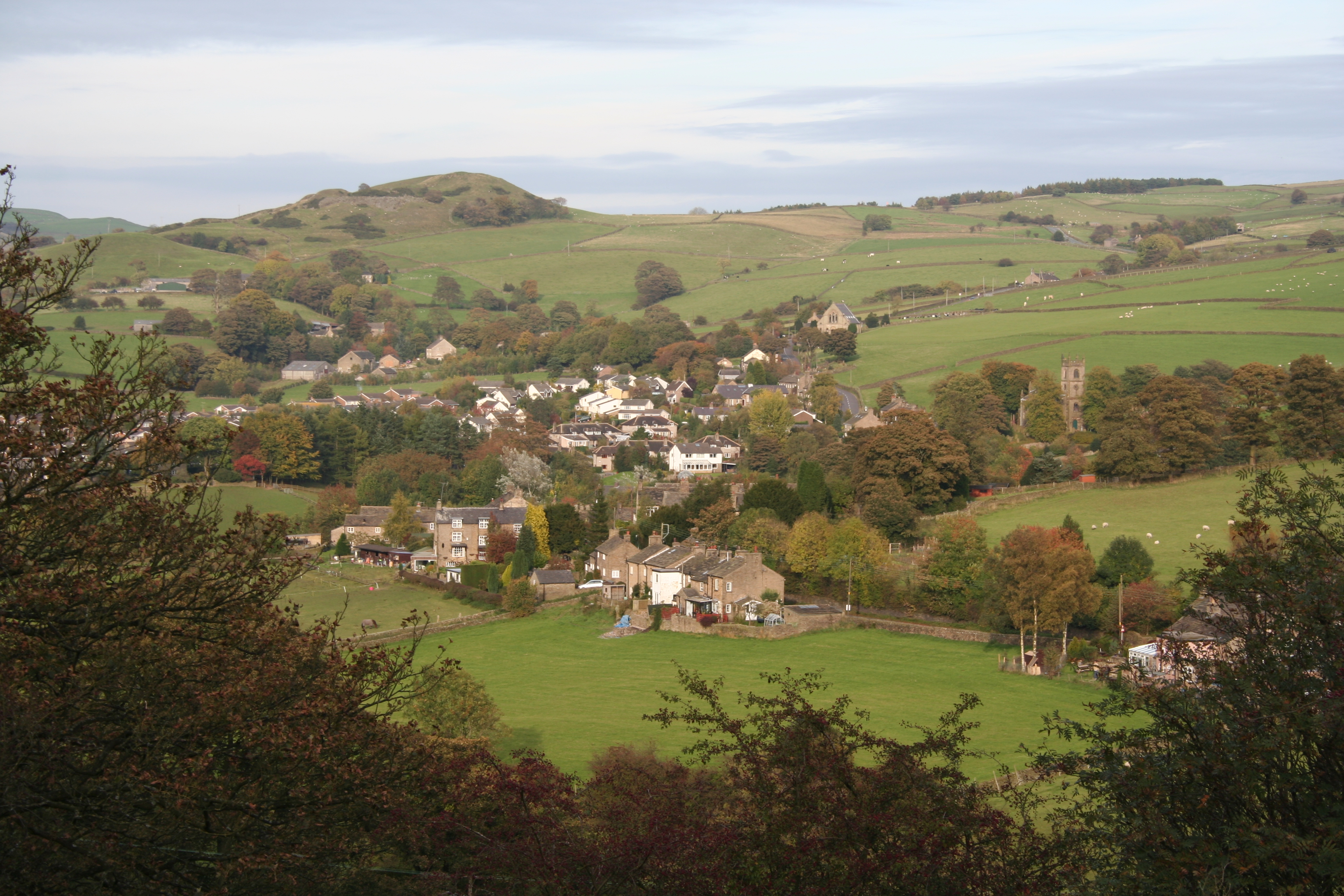
- Rainow from the west, 2010

- Location within Cheshire
- Population: 2,505
- OS grid reference: SJ950761
- Civil parish: Rainow
- Unitary authority: Cheshire East
- Ceremonial county: Cheshire
- Region: North West
- Country: England
- Sovereign state: United Kingdom
- Post town: MACCLESFIELD
- Postcode district: SK10
- Dialling code: 01625
- Police: Cheshire
- Fire: Cheshire
- Ambulance: North West
- UK Parliament: Macclesfield

Rainow is a village and civil parish in Cheshire, England, in the valley of the River Dean and next to the B5470 road between Macclesfield and Kettleshulme. It straddles the eastern side of the Peak District border of Derbyshire and Cheshire, and is surrounded by pasture farmland. The Peak District Boundary Walk runs past the village. The village's name comes from the Old English hræfn + hōh, meaning "hill-spur frequented by ravens". It is a former mill village and has a population of around 2,500.

To the east of the village is Lamaload Reservoir, the first concrete reservoir constructed in England, between 1958 and 1964. At 308 metres (1,010 ft), it is also the highest constructed dam in England.

White Nancy, a circular, white-painted stone structure constructed to celebrate the anniversary of the Battle of Waterloo, stands at the northern end of Kerridge Hill on the boundary between the parishes of Rainow and Bollington.

== School ==
Rainow Primary School has a capacity of around 180 pupils, covering Reception through to Year 6 (ages 4–11).

== Holy Trinity Church ==
Holy Trinity Church was built in 1846 at a cost of £1,800 by John Mellor of Kerridge End on land donated by Joseph Harding. The architect was Samuel Howard of Disley. In 1958, the present vicarage was built adjoining the church. There are regular services and events at the Church which are advertised on their website.

== Jenkin Chapel ==
Jenkin Chapel was constructed of local gritstone in 1733. It has an external flight of steps leading to a gallery (a small tower with a saddleback roof was added in 1754–55). Originally dedicated to St. John the Baptist, it was consecrated in 1894 and re-dedicated to St. John the Evangelist. There are monthly services on the third Sunday of the month.

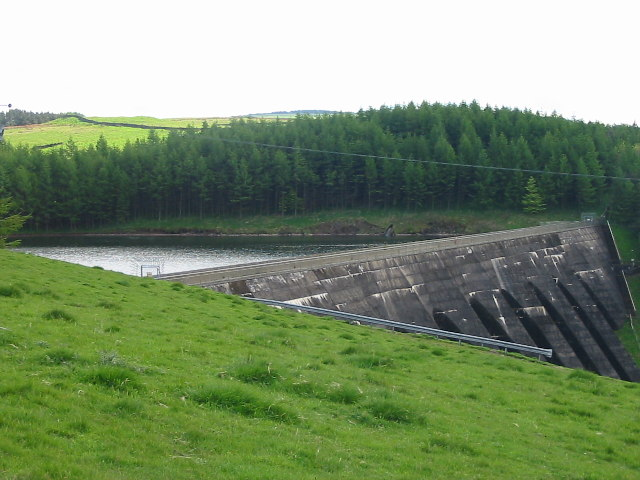
Lamaload Reservoir, 2005

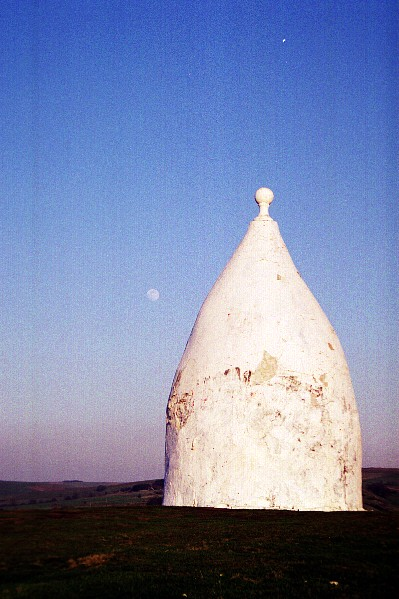
White Nancy, 2005

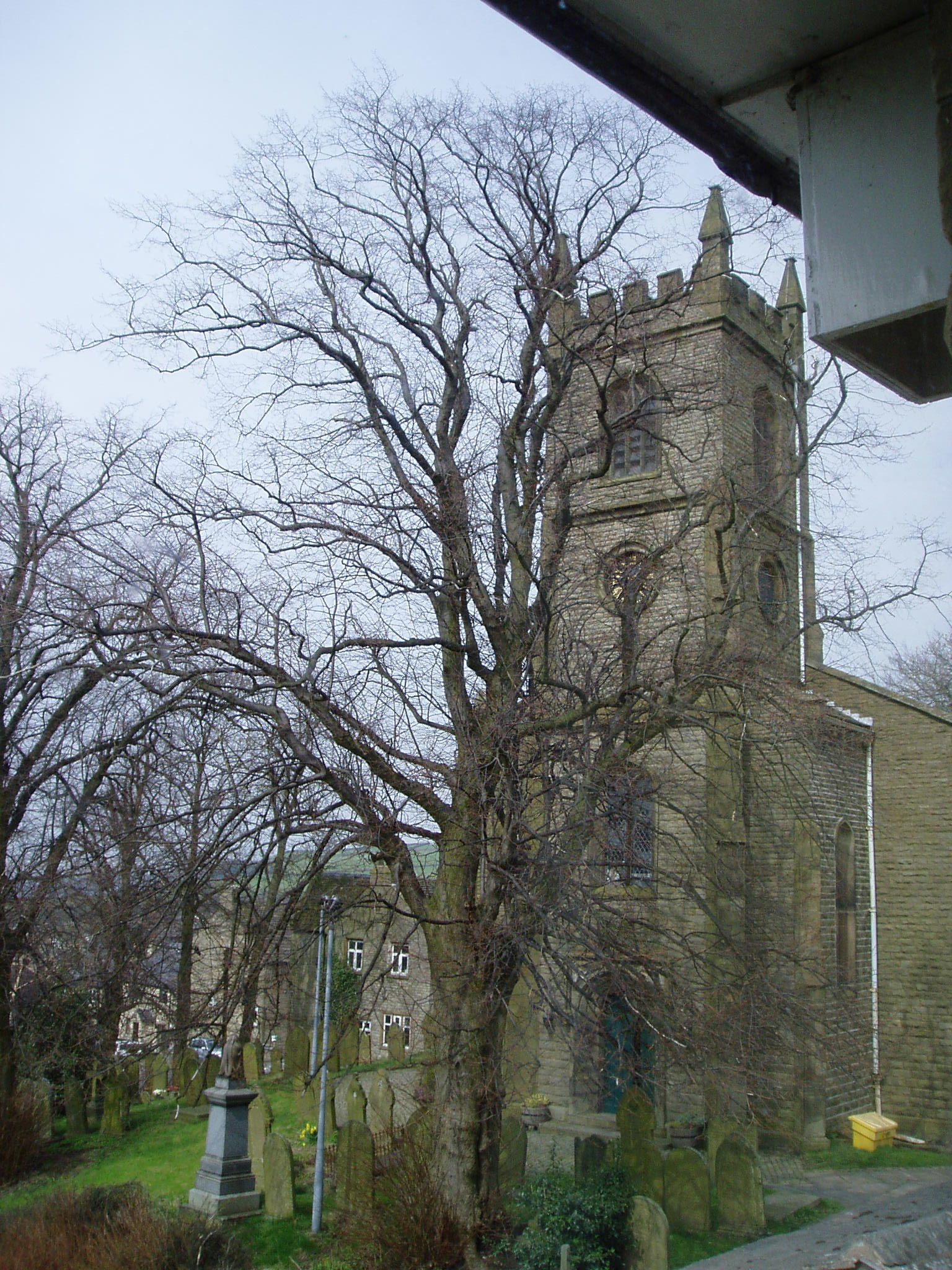
Holy Trinity Church, 2006

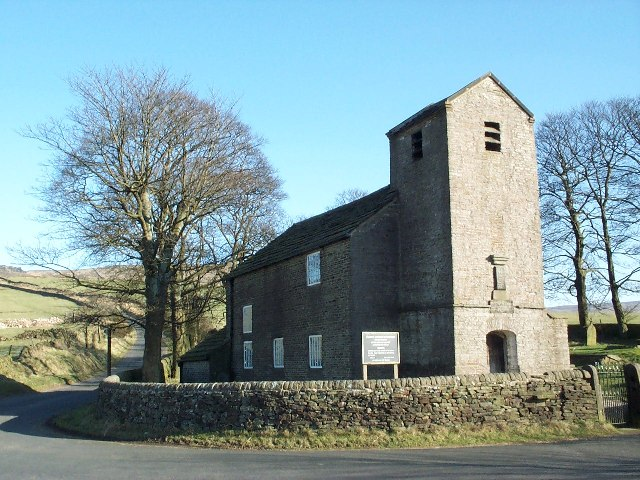
Jenkin Chapel, 2003

== Cultural events ==
Rainow has an annual Church Fête with tea marquee, tug of war, and a fell race across Kerridge Hill that overlooks the village. The fête is also associated with a two-week display of 'scarecrows' throughout the village. An annual 5-mile race called The Rainow Five leads from the institute, up Kerridge then back down; it attracts many local runners, as well as the occasional celebrity such as Tony Audenshaw from the ITV soap opera Emmerdale.

== Notable people ==
Notable residents of the village are Stephen Morris and Gillian Gilbert, members of the bands Joy Division, New Order and the Other Two. Both grew up in nearby Macclesfield. The Stone Roses' guitarist John Squire also lives in the village. Previous residents include Brian Redhead (journalist, author and broadcaster), Bill Turnbull (BBC television and radio presenter and journalist 2012–16), and George Osborne, a retired politician and newspaper editor who served as Chancellor of the Exchequer, and as First Secretary of State in the Cameron government.

== See also ==
- Listed buildings in Rainow
