= Mary Carew Pole =

British courtier

Dame Mary Carew Pole, Lady Carew Pole, DCVO (née Dawnay; born 1936), is a British courtier.

She was born in 1936, the daughter of Lieutenant-Colonel Ronald Dawnay (1908–1990) and Lady Elizabeth Grey (1908–1941), daughter of Charles Grey, 5th Earl Grey; through her father, she is the great-granddaughter of the 8th Viscount Downe and the 5th Marquess of Waterford, and a great-great-granddaughter of the 8th Duke of Beaufort.

Dawnay was the journalist and politician Aidan Crawley's secretary from 1962 to 1966. In 1970 Princess Anne appointed Dawnay to be a lady-in-waiting and she remained as such until January 2024, when she was appointed an Extra Lady-in-Waiting to the Princess. For her services, she was appointed a Commander of the Royal Victorian Order in 2003 and promoted to Dame Commander in 2018.

In 1974, she married Richard Carew Pole (1938–2024), who, in 1993, succeeded to the Pole baronetcy of Shute House. They had two sons:

- Sir Tremayne John Carew Pole, 14th Baronet (b. 1974), who married Charlotte Louise Campbell Watkins
- John Alexander George Carew Pole (b. 1975)
