= Cornwall Wildlife Trust =

Wildlife conservation charity

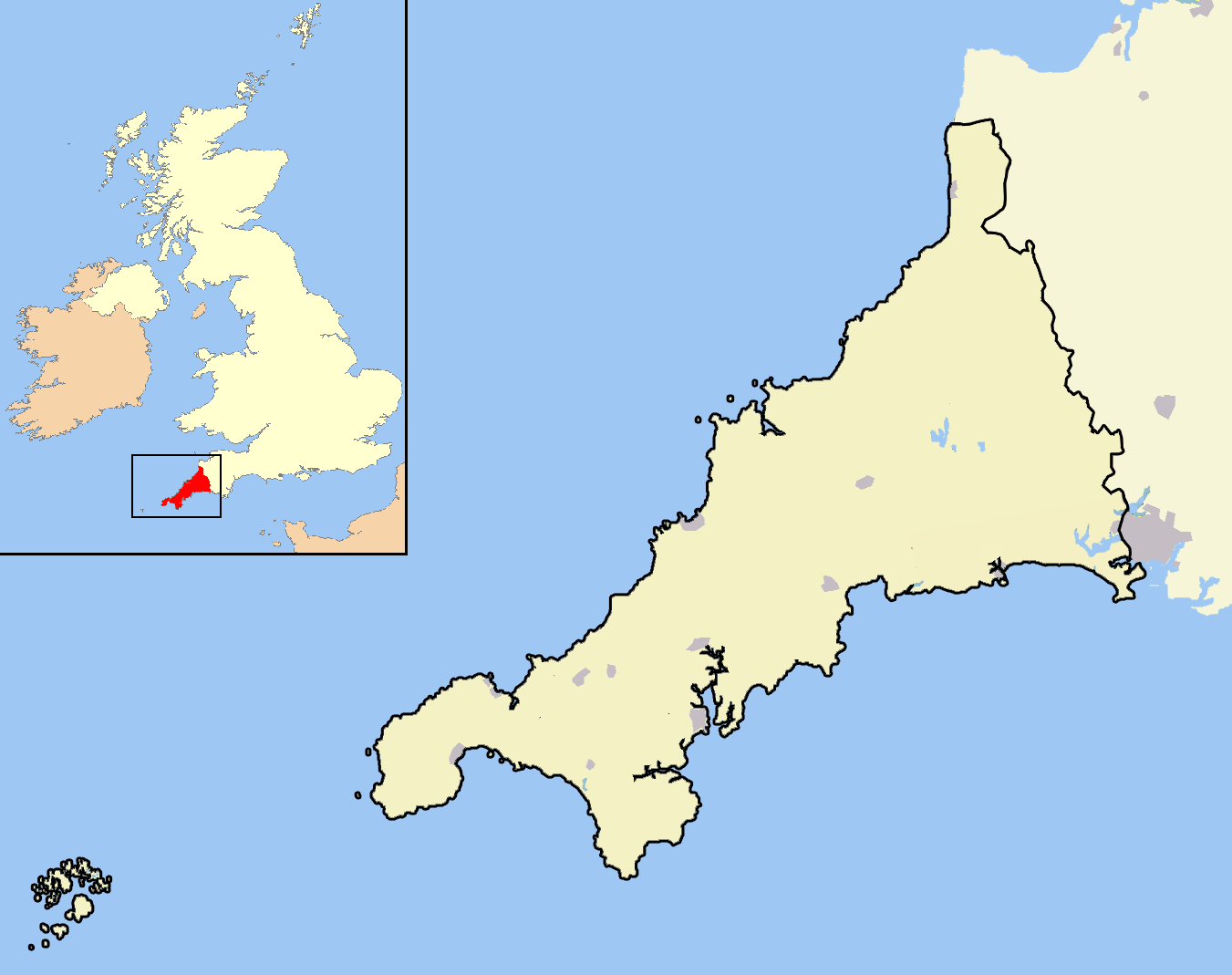
- Formation: 1962
- Type: Registered Charity
- Purpose: Conservation and Preservation
- Headquarters: Truro, Cornwall
- Official language: English
- Parent organization: Wildlife Trusts partnership
- Website: Cornwall Wildlife Trust

The Cornwall Wildlife Trust (founded as the Cornwall Naturalists' Club) is a charitable organisation founded in 1962 that is concerned solely with Cornwall, United Kingdom. It deals with the conservation and preservation of Cornwall's wildlife, geology and habitats managing over 50 nature reserves covering approximately 4,300 acres (17 km^{2}), amongst them Looe Island. The Trust conducts both land and marine conservation programmes.

== History ==
The Cornwall Wildlife Trust is a charitable organisation founded in 1962 that is concerned with the conservation and preservation of Cornwall's wildlife, geology and habitats, both on land and in the marine environment. Frank Turk, Stella Turk and Jean Paton were all involved in the founding of the organisation. The Trust is part of The Wildlife Trusts partnership of 46 wildlife trusts in the United Kingdom. It works in conjunction with the Isles of Scilly Wildlife Trust on some matters. The Trust is based at Allet near Truro in Cornwall. The headquarters and offices are adjacent to the Trust's Five Acres nature reserve. This reserve includes two ponds, as well as mixed broadleaved and conifer woodland. As of 2024 the Trust's chief executive is Matt Walpole. The Trust is run by a group of elected volunteer trustees, as of 2024 chaired by Oliver Blount.

== Activities ==
The trust deals with the conservation and preservation of Cornwall's wildlife, geology and habitats, managing over 50 nature reserves covering approximately 4,300 acres (17 km^{2}), amongst them Looe Island. Cornwall Wildlife Trust produces a thrice-yearly magazine called Wild Cornwall.

The direction and work that the Trust currently does is guided by the Cornwall Biodiversity action plan. Living Seas and Living Landscapes are two such projects. The Trust runs ERCCIS (Environmental Records Centre for Cornwall and the Isles of Scilly), a county wide database of sightings of animals and plants, and records of geology. It also gives planning advice (CEC - Cornwall Environmental Consultants) to land developers.

In 2024 the Trust received a National Lottery grant of £265,000, with a possible follow-up grant of £3m, allowing the Trust to launch a rewilding campaign, named the Tor to Shore project.

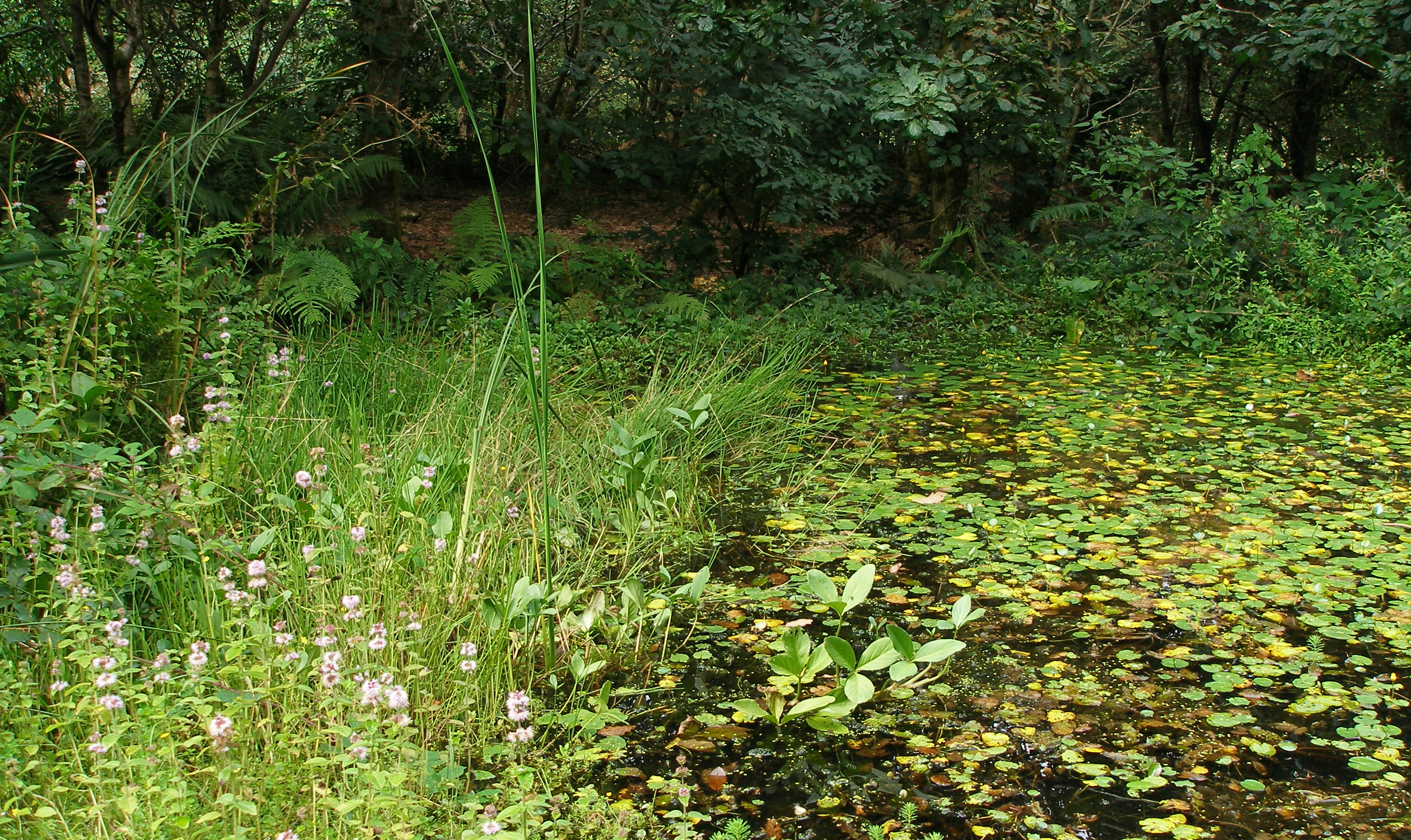
One of the ponds at Five Acres

== List of reserves ==
1. Armstrong Wood
2. Baker's Pit
3. Beales Meadows
4. Bissoe Valley
5. Bosvenning Common
6. Cabilla and Redrice Woods
7. Caer Brân
8. Carn Moor
9. Chûn Downs
10. Churchtown Farm, near Saltash
11. Chyverton
12. Devichoys Wood, near Penryn
13. Downhill Meadow
14. River Fal—River Ruan Estuary
15. Five Acres, at the Cornwall Wildlife Trust Headquarters, Allet, near Truro
16. Fox Corner, south of Truro
17. Greena Moor
18. Halbullock Moor, south of Truro
19. Hawkes Wood
20. Helman Tor (including Breney Common and Red Moor, near Lostwithiel
21. Kemyel Crease
22. Kennall Vale, at Ponsanooth, between Falmouth & Redruth
23. Lanvean Bottoms
24. Loggan's Moor, near Hayle
25. Loveny/Colliford Reservoir
26. Lower Lewdon
27. Luckett/Greenscombe Wood

28. Maer Lake
29. Nansmellyn Marsh
30. North Predannack Downs
31. Park Hoskyn - The Hayman Reserve
32. Pendarves Wood, near Camborne
33. Penlee Battery, near Kingsand
34. Phillips's Point
35. Priddacombe Downs
36. Prideaux Wood
37. Quoit Heathland
38. Redlake Cottage Meadows
39. Ropehaven Cliffs
40. Rosenannon Downs
41. St Erth Pits, at St. Erth
42. St George's Island (or Looe Island), near Looe
43. Swanvale, Falmouth
44. Sylvia's Meadow, near Callington
45. Tamar Estuary, near Saltash
46. Tincombe, near Saltash
47. Trebarwith, near Tintagel
48. Tregonetha Downs, near Goss Moor
49. Tresayes Quarry, near Roche
50. Tywardreath Marsh, near Par
51. Upton Meadow, near Bude
52. Upton Towans, near Hayle
53. Ventongimps Moor, near Zelah, Cornwall
54. Marsland Valley, north of Bude
55. Windmill Farm, on The Lizard

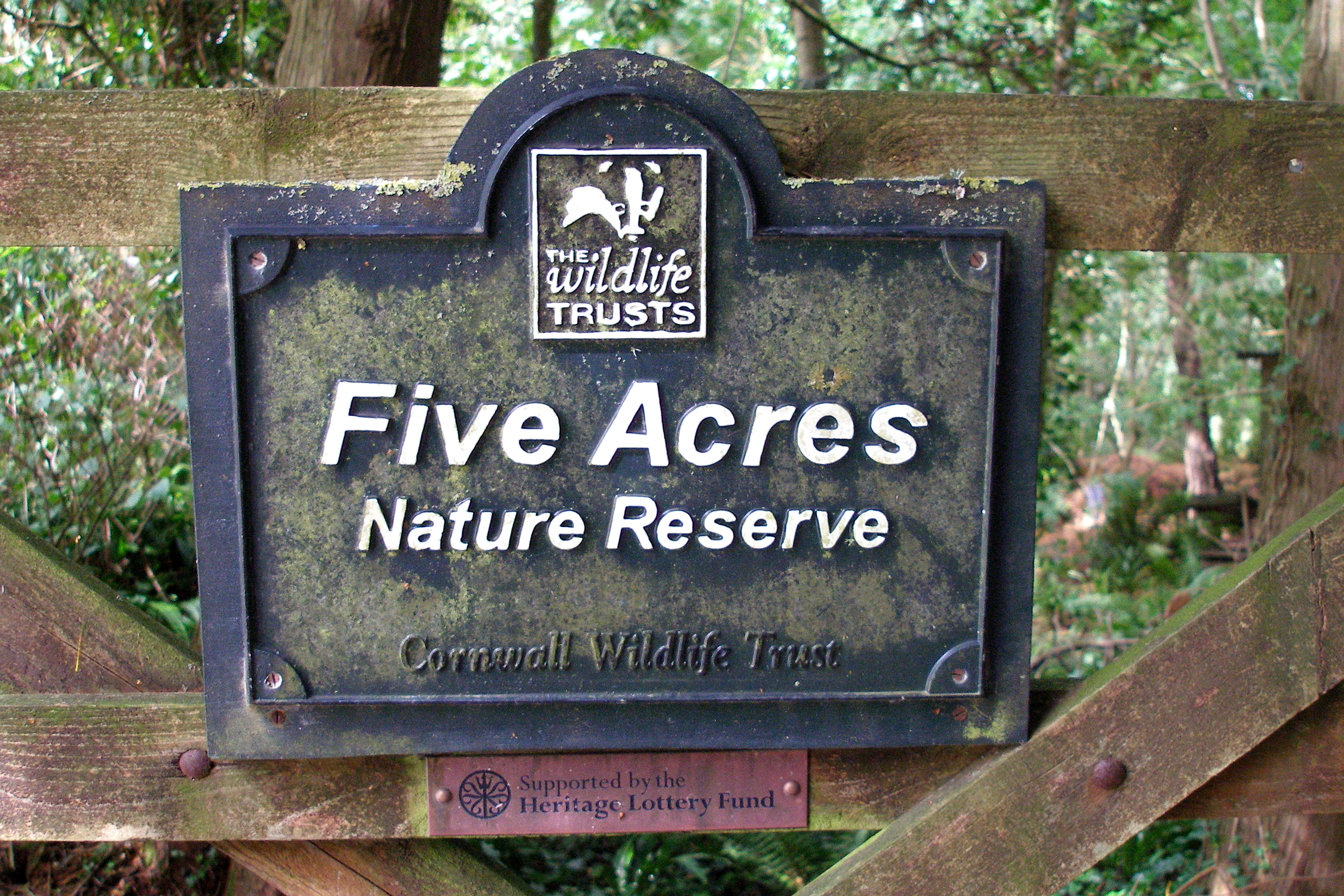
Five Acres Nature Reserve

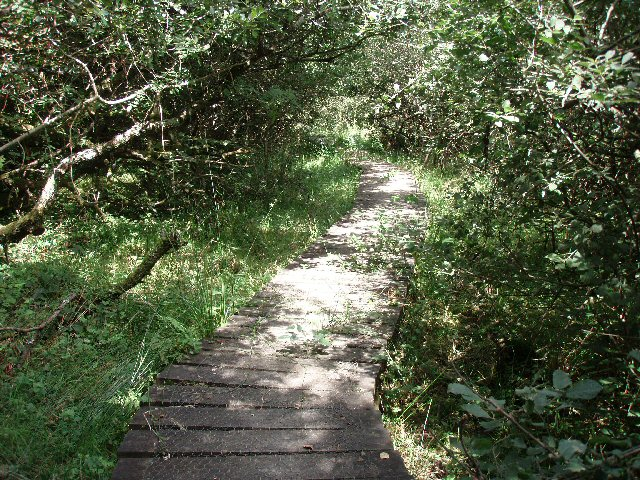
Lower Lewdon Nature Reserve

== See also ==
- Stella Turk
