= Pole baronets of Shute House (1628) =

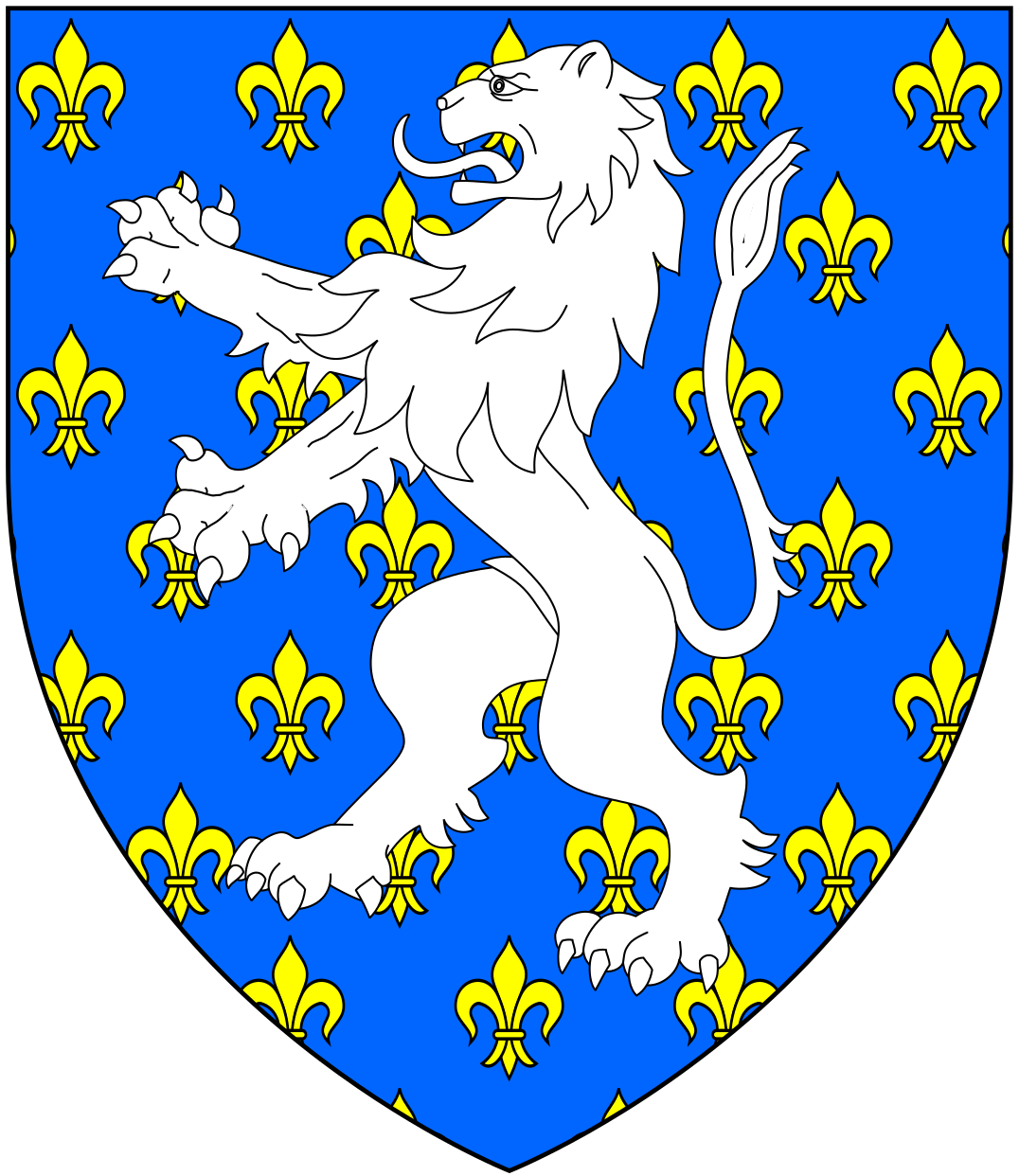
Arms of Pole of Shute: Azure semée of fleur-de-lys or, a lion rampant argent

The Pole (later de-la-Pole, later Reeve-de-la-Pole) baronetcy, of Shute House in the County of Devon, was created in the Baronetage of England on 12 September 1628 for John Pole (died 1658), Member of Parliament for Devon. It was created during the lifetime of his father, the historian of Devon, Sir William Pole (d. 1635), Knight, MP, of Colcombe Castle and Shute in Devon. The second Baronet was Member of Parliament for Honiton. The third Baronet represented Lyme Regis, Bossiney, Devon, East Looe and Newport in the House of Commons. The fourth Baronet was Member of Parliament for Newport, Camelford, Devon, Bossiney and Honiton. The sixth Baronet represented West Looe in Parliament. In 1790 he assumed the surname of de-la-Pole, which his successor discontinued. The eighth Baronet assumed in 1838 the surname of Reeve-de-la-Pole but later discontinued it.

George Cokayne's 1900 edition of the Complete Baronetage records that in 1883 the family estates of the Baronetcy comprised 5,846 acres in Devon yielding £7,416 annually (centred on the family seat, Shute House) as well as a minor landholding in Berkshire yielding £337 annually.

The tenth Baronet resumed the use of the surname of de-la-Pole. The eleventh Baronet was High Sheriff of Devon in 1917. The twelfth Baronet, who succeeded his kinsman in 1926, was the son of Lieutenant-General Sir Reginald Pole-Carew, eldest son of William Henry Pole-Carew, third son of the Right Honourable Reginald Pole-Carew, Member of Parliament for Lostwithiel (who assumed the additional surname of Carew), elder son of Reginald Pole, son of Reverend Carolus Pole, third son of the third Baronet, by his wife Sarah Rashleigh, daughter of Jonathan Rashleigh (1642–1702), of Menabilly, Cornwall, Sheriff of Cornwall in 1687 (of whom a portrait exists at Antony House), by his wife Jane Carew, daughter of Sir John Carew, 3rd Baronet (see Carew baronets). On his succession he assumed by deed poll the surname of Pole only in lieu of Pole-Carew. Pole was a Colonel in the Coldstream Guards, a member, chairman and Alderman of the Cornwall County Council and Lord-Lieutenant of Cornwall.

The thirteenth Baronet, who succeeded his father in 1993, was a member of the Cornwall County Council, High Sheriff of Cornwall in 1980 and a Deputy Lieutenant of the county. Since his death in 2024, the title is held by his son, Sir Tremayne John Carew Pole, 14th Baronet.

== Pole baronets, of Shute House (1628) ==
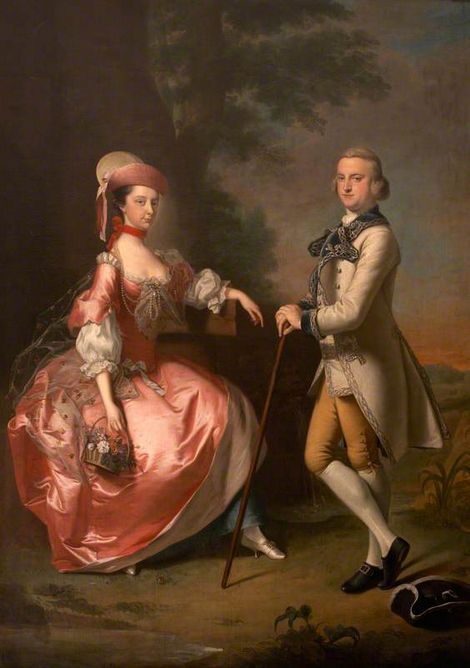
Sir John Pole, 5th Baronet, with his wife in 1755

- Sir John Pole, 1st Baronet (c.1589–1658)
- Sir Courtenay Pole, 2nd Baronet (bap. 1619 – 1695)
- Sir John Pole, 3rd Baronet (1649–1708)
- Sir William Pole, 4th Baronet (bap. 1678 – 1741)
- Sir John Pole, 5th Baronet (c. 1733 – by 1777)
- Sir John de la Pole, 6th Baronet (bap. 1757 – 1799)
- Sir William Templer Pole, 7th Baronet (1782–1847)
- Sir John George Reeve-De-la-Pole, 8th Baronet (1808–1874)
- Sir William Edmund de la Pole, 9th Baronet (1816–1895)
- Sir Edmund Reginald Talbot de la Pole, 10th Baronet (1844–1912)
- Sir Frederick Arundell de la Pole, 11th Baronet (1850–1926)
- Sir John Gawen Carew Pole, 12th Baronet (1902–1993)
- Sir John Richard Walter Reginald Carew Pole, 13th Baronet (1938–2024)
- Sir Tremayne John Carew Pole, 14th Baronet (born 1974)

The heir apparent is the present baronet's son, Lucian William Patrick (born 2016).
