= Weir Wood Reservoir =

Lake in East Sussex, England

Coordinates: 51.096°N 0.011°W

- Site of Special Scientific Interest
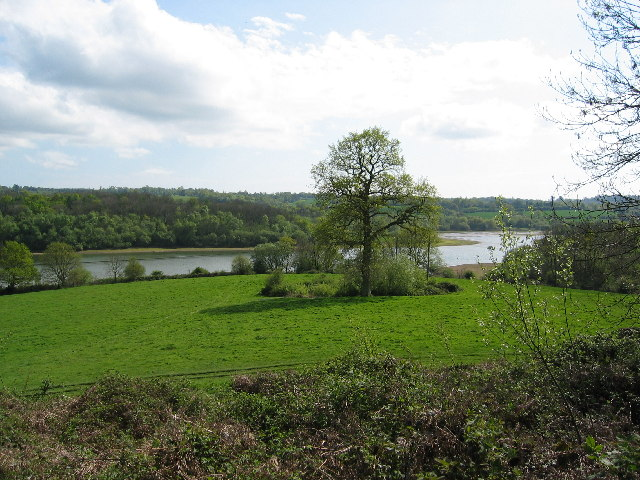
- Location of Weir Wood Reservoir.
- Area of search: East Sussex
- Grid reference: TQ 394 348
- Interest: Biological
- Area: 153.5 hectares (379 acres)
- Notification date: 1985
- Location map: Magic Map

Weir Wood Reservoir is a 153.5-hectare (379-acre) biological Site of Special Scientific Interest west of Forest Row in East Sussex. It is in High Weald Area of Outstanding Natural Beauty and an area of 32.6 hectares (81 acres) is a Local Nature Reserve which is owned by Southern Water and managed by East Sussex County Council and Southern Water.

This is one of the largest bodies of open water in the county and it has rich and diverse communities of breeding, wintering and passage birds. Breeding birds include great crested grebe, teal, mute swan, tufted duck, little grebe, reed warbler, sedge warbler, coot and moorhen.

Weir Wood is also home to a fishing lodge and, until 2025, a sailing club.
