= Drift Reservoir =

Reservoir in Cornwall, England

- Kreun an Drev
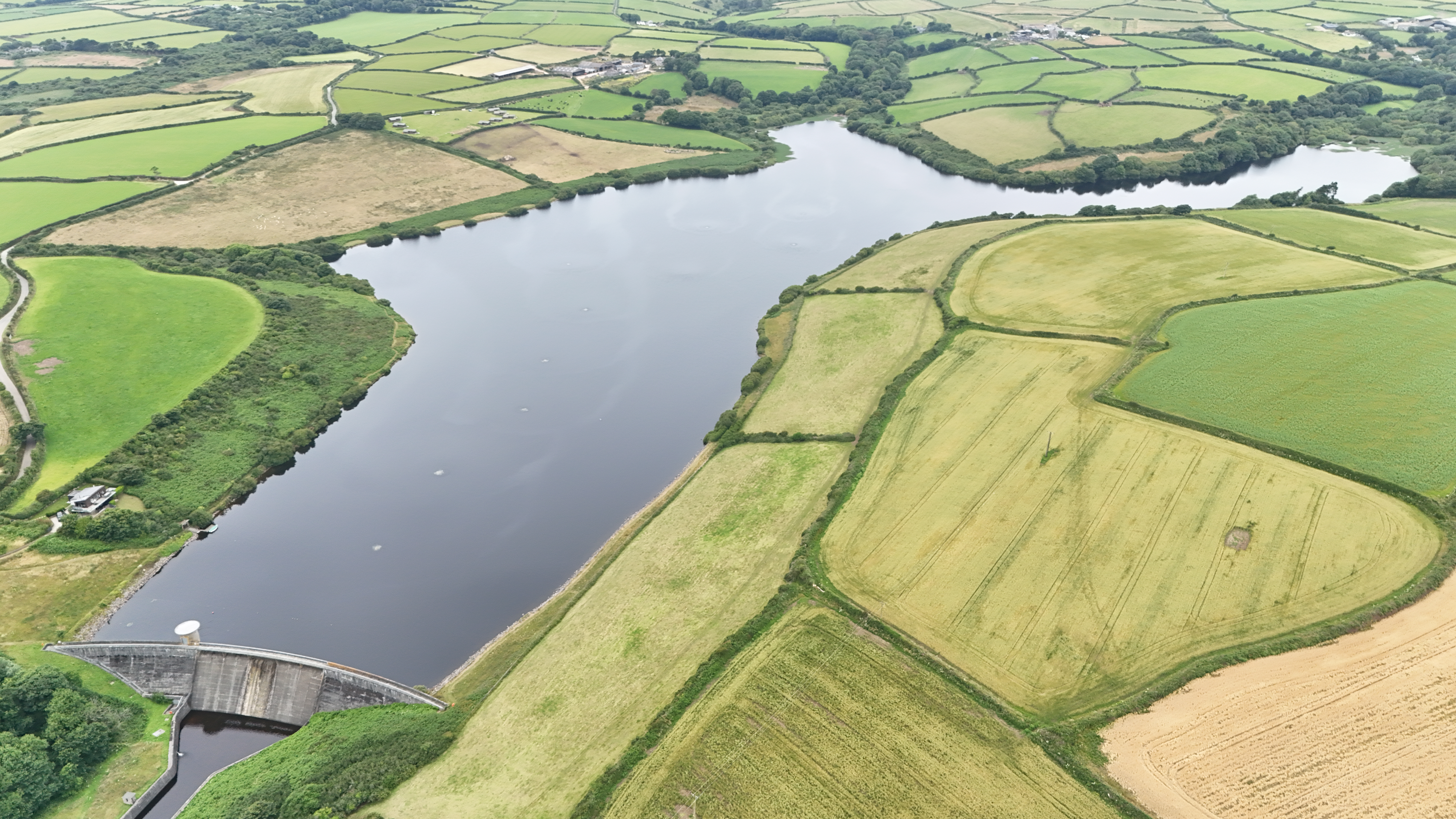

- Location within Cornwall
- Location: Cornwall
- Coordinates: 50.1080°N 5.5910°W
- Type: reservoir
- Basin countries: United Kingdom
- Max. length: 1,200 yd (1,097.3 m)
- Surface area: 65 acres (26 ha)
- Max. depth: 48 ft (14.6 m)
- Water volume: 1,200 million L (260 million imp gal; 970 acre⋅ft)
- Surface elevation: 275 feet (83.8 metres)

Drift Reservoir (Cornish: Kreun an Drev, meaning reservoir of the farmstead) is a reservoir in Cornwall, England, UK, just north of the village of Drift and west of Penzance. The reservoir is 1,200 yards (1,100 m) long and covers 65 acres (26 ha). The dam is at the southern end of the reservoir and the northern end splits into north-western and north-eastern shallow arms. It is currently managed jointly by the South West Lakes Trust and South West Water. There is public access to the dam with a parking area.

== History ==
The reservoir was first given statutory approval in 1938 (under the Penzance Corporation Act 1938) but construction was deferred until after World War II. A joint water scheme was agreed by the Penzance and St Ives Borough Councils to provide water for the Land's End peninsula in 1951 and work finally commenced on 1 March 1959 by Robert Alpine and Sons. The original design had to be amended during excavations when rotting granite was found. It was completed for the West Cornwall Water Board in 1961. It is still the principal source of water for the Penwith area.

The valley of Trewidden Vean, now known as the Lost Valley, was evacuated starting in 1938, with the last family leaving in 1961. The valley was cleared of trees before building started and most of Nanquitho Farm and farmhouse is now under water. The water level in the reservoir sometimes drops low enough to reveal the remains of houses and roads; this happened in the 1970s, the 1990s, and in the summer of 2018.

== Natural history and ecology ==
Initially, in 1962, the reservoir was stocked with 8000 rainbow trout (Oncorhynchus mykiss) from Loch Leven trout fisheries and many buckets of shrimps from Stithians Reservoir. At the beginning of the 21st-century there was over eighty mute swan (Cygnus olor) and many Canada goose (Branta canadensis) due to feeding them out of date items from a local bakery. At the request of the Bolitho Estate feeding was stopped to protect the fishery and water quality.

Due to its geographical location close to the sea, plus good areas of shallow water and exposed mud, it is an important landfall for migrating waders. The north-west arm of the reservoir is managed by the Cornwall Birdwatching and Preservation Society (CBWPS) and the bird hide, due to insurance considerations, is open to members of that organisation only. A successful bird reserve needs an area that is free of continuous disturbance and in 2001 a no fishing area was established in the north-west arm, along with a reed bed of Phragmites australis. A year later it was reported that the no fishing area had helped breeding birds which included common coot (Fulica atra), mallard (Anas platyrhynchos) and mute swan.

Although generally hosting only small numbers of birds (244 species recorded), the reservoir has attracted a considerable number of North American vagrant shorebirds and wildfowl, including a number of lesser scaup (Aythya affinis). In May 2016 a Dalmatian pelican (Pelecanus crispus) was seen in western Cornwall and was frequently seen on the reservoir. There are 5,000 year old fossil remains of this species from Somerset and this bird could be the first recorded in Britain since then. At the same time as the Dalmatian pelican, a cackling goose, (Branta hutchinsii), which is a scarce but regular North American vagrant was at the reservoir.

Rainbow trout and blue trout are released in the reservoir for trout fishing along with the native brown trout (Salmo trutta). The Cornish open float tube competition is held annually in May.

== Gallery ==
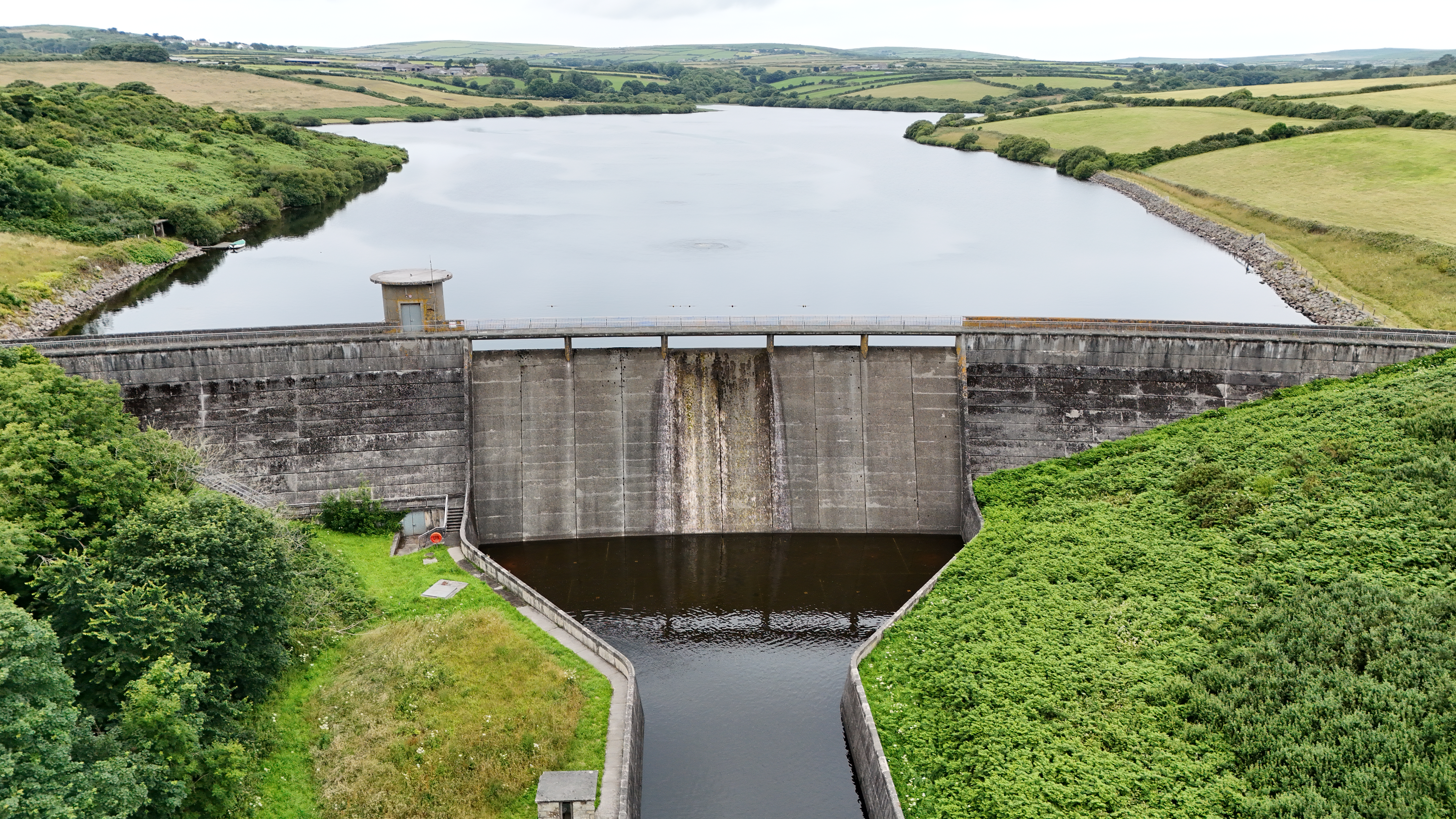

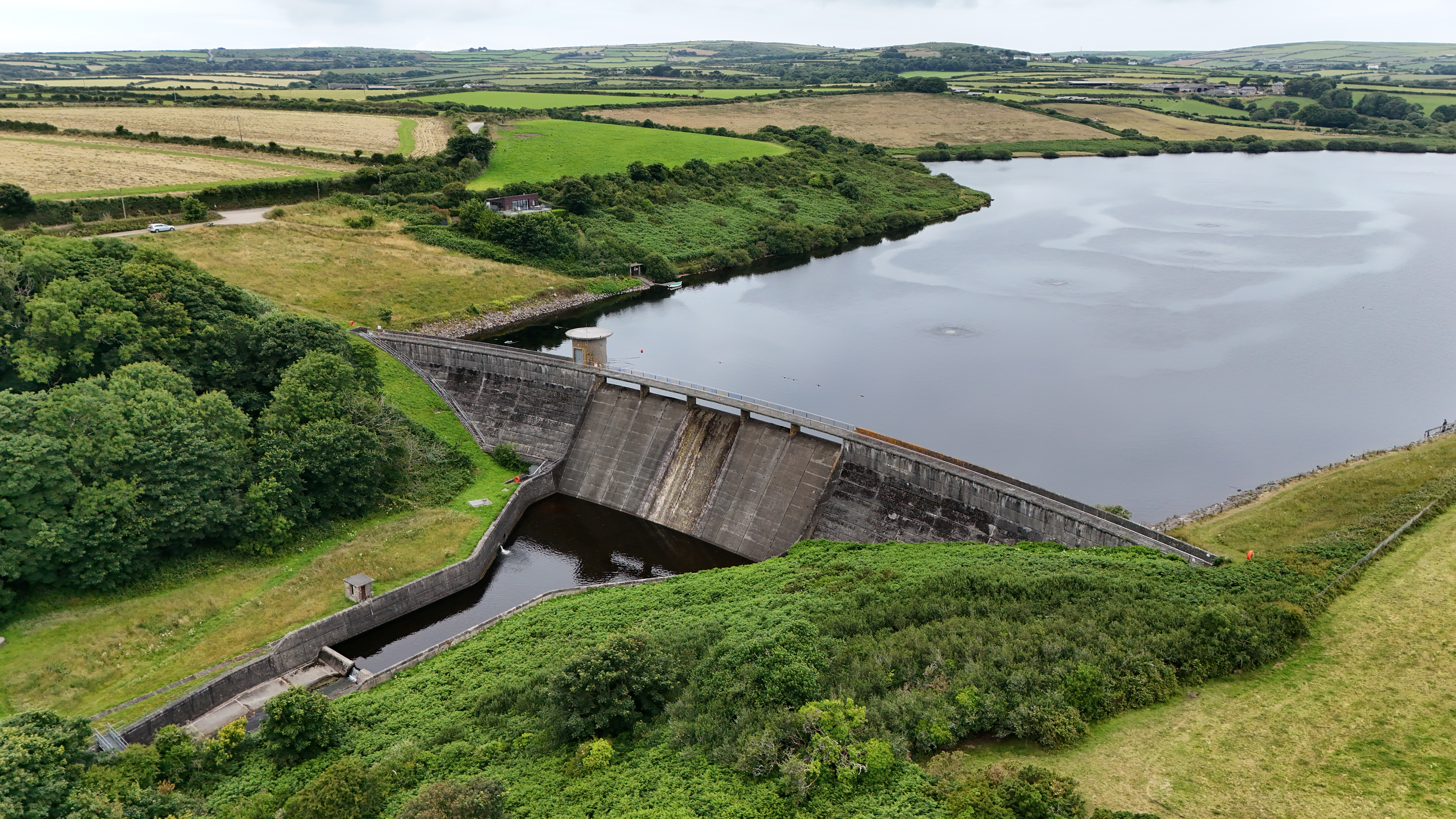

== See also ==
- List of reservoirs and dams in the United Kingdom
