= Stithians Reservoir =

Reservoir in Cornwall, England

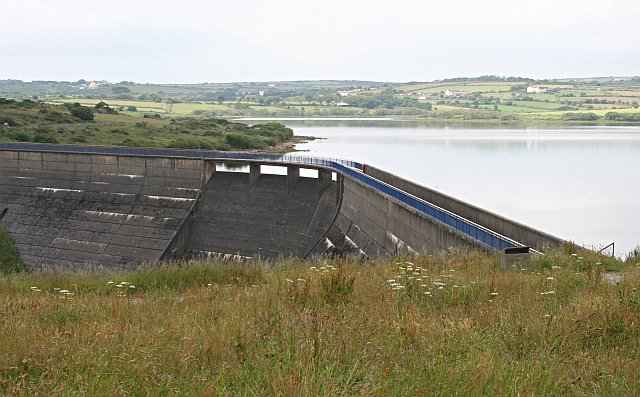

- Location within Cornwall
- Location: Cornwall TR16 6NW
- Coordinates: 50°10′54″N 5°12′16″W grid reference SW 713 362
- Type: reservoir
- Basin countries: England, United Kingdom
- Surface area: 1.1 km^{2} (0.42 sq mi)
- Water volume: 5,205 megalitres (4,220 acre⋅ft)
- Settlements: Stithians, Cornwall

Stithians Reservoir (Cornish: Kreun Stedhyan) is a reservoir situated just under a mile to the west of the village of Stithians, Cornwall, England, UK. It covers 247 acres and can hold 4,967,000 litres (1,093,000 imp gal; 1,312,000 US gal).

== History ==
Work on the dam began on 19 July 1962, however work stopped shortly after due to excavations which revealed the site was over a large area of soft kaolinised granite, which would require expensive foundations. A new design was drawn up for the dam, which was the current arched design. The dam was opened on 13 October 1967 by Sir John Carew Pole, whilst the Bishop of Truro, Dr Maurice Key blessed the reservoir.

By the opening in 1967 the valley behind the dam was completely flooded, 111 hectares (274 acres) of farmland and three country houses became submerged. Two causeways were built to carry sections of roads that were flooded, one at the southern end and the other in the north western corner near the Golden Lion Inn.

== Statistics ==
The dam is 41.5 metres (136 ft) high and 244 metres (801 ft) wide. It was built at a total cost of £1,125,000.

== Usage ==
There is a campsite and an outdoor activity centre offering watersports facilities at Stithians Lake, including sailing, windsurfing, kayaking, SUP and canoeing activities. Other activities include bird watching and fly fishing for trout.

== See also ==
- List of reservoirs and dams in the United Kingdom
