= Antony House =

Grade I listed historic house museum in Antony, United Kingdom

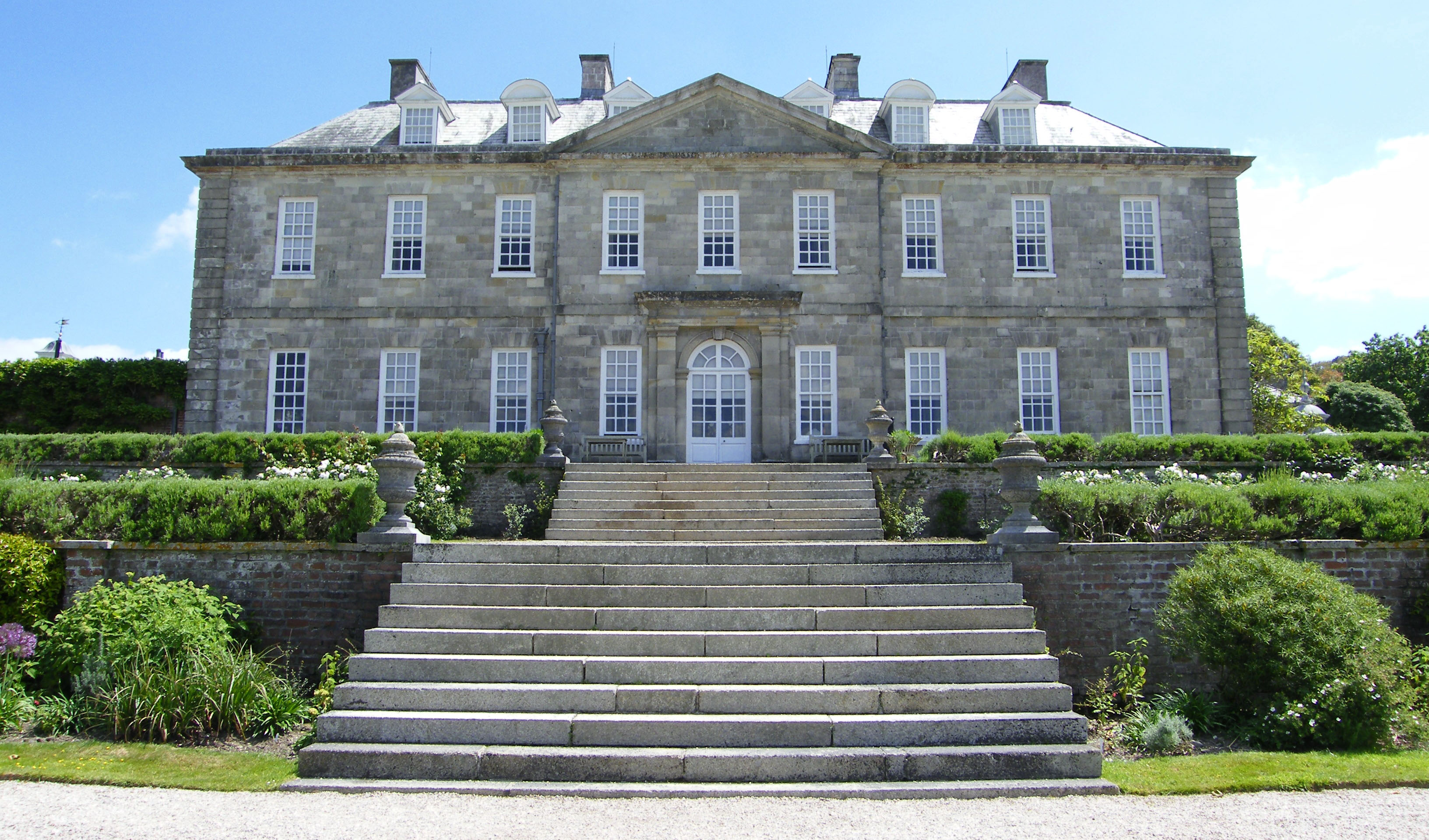

- Location within Cornwall
- 50.38529°N 4.22723°W
- Location: Antony, Cornwall, England

History
- Built: 1718–1729

Site notes
- Owner: National Trust

Listed Building – Grade I
- Official name: Antony House
- Designated: 21 July 1951
- Reference no.: 1311081

National Register of Historic Parks and Gardens
- Official name: Antony
- Designated: 11 June 1987
- Reference no.: 1000647

Antony House is an early 18th-century property in the care of the National Trust. It is located between the town of Torpoint and the village of Antony in the county of Cornwall, England, United Kingdom. It is a Grade I listed building.

The house is faced in silvery-grey Pentewan stone, flanked by colonnaded wings of mellow brick and overlooks the River Lynher.

== History ==
The house was built for Sir William Carew, 5th Baronet between 1718 and 1724, and ever since has continued as the primary residence of the Carew family, who have owned the estate since the mid-16th century. The Return of Owners of Land, 1873 Survey recorded that the Carew-Pole Estates near Torpoint in Cornwall comprised 3,698 acres of land yielding an estimated £6,401.

=== Transfer to the National Trust ===
In 1961 the house's owner Sir John Carew Pole, 12th Baronet gifted Antony, along with 29 acres of surrounding gardens and parkland to the National Trust; he retained ownership of the House's contents, along with the right for his family and descendants to occupy the House. As part of the transfer to the National Trust, a restrictive covenant was placed to preserve a further 121 acres of surrounding parkland; he also transferred two neighbouring farm to the Trust to provide an endowment for the house's upkeep - the 281-acre Tregantle Farm and the 400-acre Erth Barton Farm. As of 2026 Sir John's grandson, Sir Tremayne Carew Pole, 14th Bt and his wife Charlotte, Lady Carew Pole continue to reside on the Antony Estate.

The house and gardens are open to the public between March and October.

== Collections and furnishings ==
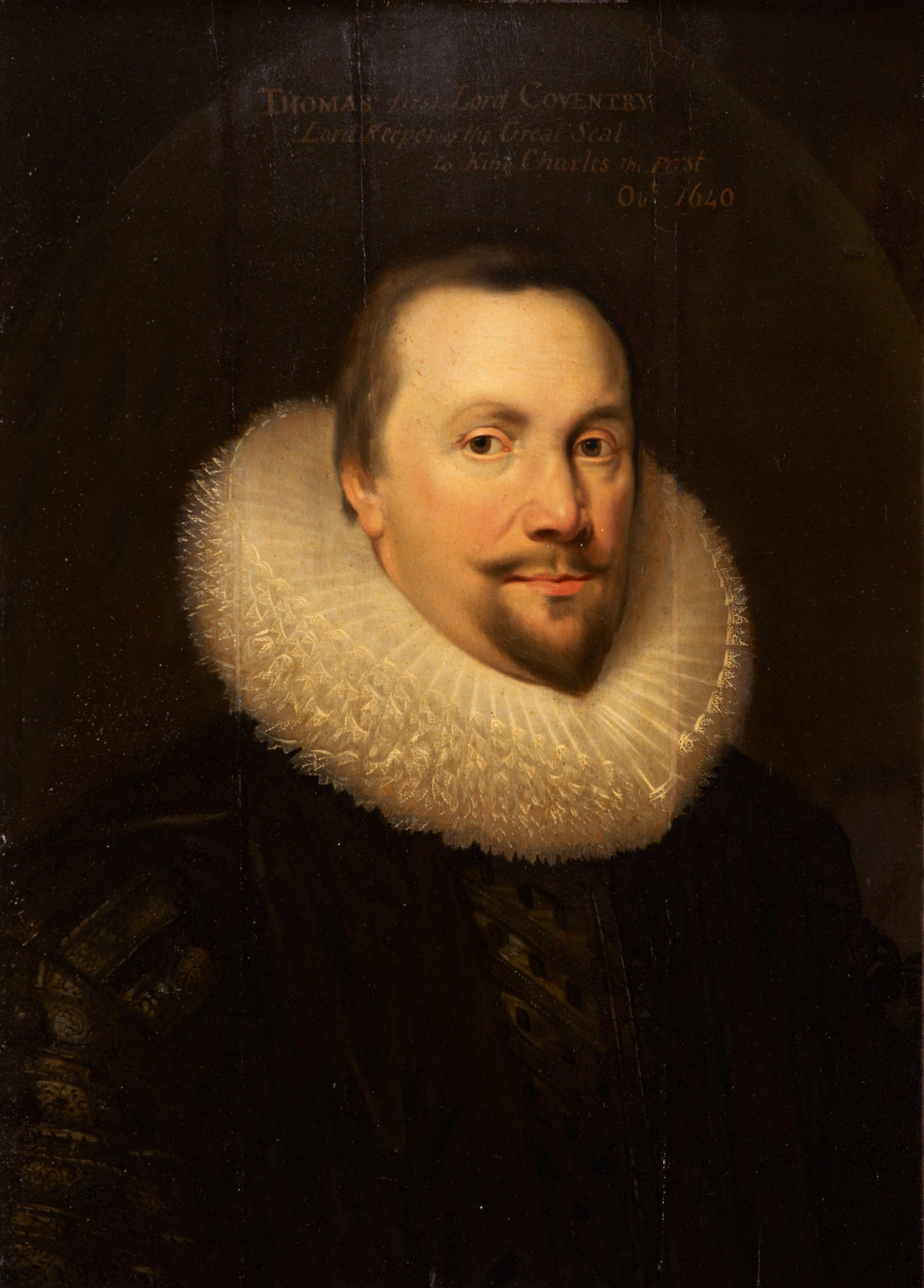
One of the portraits held at Antony House: Thomas Coventry, 1st Baron Coventry by Cornelis Janssens van Ceulen

Antony House hosts a splendid collection of portraits, including a portrait of Charles I of England at his trial, (Charles I granted a baronetcy to the Poles in 1628). The collection contains some of Sir Joshua Reynolds' works, and a portrait of Rachel Carew, believed to have inspired Daphne du Maurier's novel My Cousin Rachel.

Rooms are heavily panelled in Dutch Oak and contain fine collections of 18th-century furnishings and textiles.

== Gardens and estate ==
The grounds were landscaped by Georgian garden designer Humphry Repton and include the formal garden with the National Collection of Day Lilies. In the early 19th century, yew hedges and topiary were added to the formal landscaping. Adorning the gardens are stone carvings from North West India, a Burmese temple bell brought to Antony by General Sir Reginald Pole Carew, statuary and more recently acquired modern sculptures, including the Antony Cone water sculpture by William Pye. This echoes the grand spectacle of the topiary yew cone nearby, which is almost as tall as the house itself. Other sculptures include Jupiter Stone by Peter Randall-Page and Hypercone by Simon Thomas.

Other notable features include a black walnut tree, cork tree, a Japanese ornamental pond and knot garden. The dovecote dates from the 18th century, while a folly has been added recently in the estate grounds.

=== Antony Woodland Garden ===
This informal woodland garden of 60 acres (24 ha) is owned by the Carew Pole Garden Trust and noted for its rhododendrons, azaleas, camellias and magnolias. It is recognised by the International Camelia Society as a "Garden of Excellence". There are walks down to the River Lynher. The Bath House situated in the Wilderness area of the garden is from the 18th century.

== Film location ==
Filming for the 2010 Disney film production of Alice in Wonderland, directed by Tim Burton, took place in the grounds of Antony House in September 2008. The estate was also used as a location for a Rosamunde Pilcher TV movie by German company ZDF with director Dieter Kehler.
