= Bal maiden =

Female manual labourer

Bal maidens in traditional protective clothing, 1890

A bal maiden, from the Cornish language bal, a mine, and the English "maiden", a young or unmarried woman, was a female manual labourer working in the mining industries of Cornwall and western Devon, at the south-western extremity of Great Britain. (Note: The border between Devon and Cornwall has been repeatedly redrawn; mining personnel migrated across the border, taking new technology; and some mining operations straddled the border. Consequently, the histories of both mining areas are closely linked, and the working practices very similar. Mining took place in about half the parishes of Cornwall, at one time or another, whereas in Devon it was limited to Dartmoor and its associated river valleys. Mining operations in Devon tended to be smaller than those in Cornwall. The largest mine, Devon Great Consols near Gunnislake employed about 200 bal maidens at its peak, but few other mines in Devon employed more than 30. This compares with more than 400 bal maidens at Dolcoath. Consolidated Copper Mines, Fowey Consols, and East Wheal Crofty were among several Cornish mines which employed more than 300.) The term has been in use since at least the early 18th century. (Note: The earliest known written use of the term "bal maiden" (as "ball maiden") is in an 1819 article in The West Briton.) At least 55,000 women and girls worked as bal maidens, and the actual number is likely to have been much higher.

While women worked in coal mines elsewhere in Britain, either on the surface or underground, bal maidens worked only on the surface. It is likely that Cornish women had worked in metal mining since antiquity, but the first records of female mine workers date from the 13th century. After the Black Death in the 14th century, mining declined, and no records of female workers have been found from then until the late 17th century. Industrial improvements, the end of Crown control of metal mines, and rising demand for raw materials caused a boom in Cornish mining in the late 17th and early 18th centuries. Increasing numbers of women and girls were recruited to the mines from about 1720, processing ore sent up by the male miners underground. The discovery of cheaper sources of copper in North Wales in the 1770s triggered a crash in the copper price, and many mines closed.

As the Industrial Revolution began in the late 18th and early 19th centuries, the Welsh metal mines declined and mining in Cornwall and Devon became viable once more. Women and girls were recruited in large numbers for work in ore processing. Women and children accounted for up to half the workers in the area's copper mines. Although machinery was capable of performing much of the work done by bal maidens, the industry grew so quickly that the number of women and girls working grew steadily even though their numbers fell as a proportion of the workforce to 15–20% by 1850. At the peak of the Cornish mining boom, in around 1860, at least 6,000 bal maidens were working at the region's mines; the actual number is likely to have been much higher. While it was not unusual for girls to become bal maidens at the age of six and to work into old age, they generally began at around age 10 or 11 and left work once they married.

From the 1860s, Cornish mines faced competition from cheap metal imports, and legislation introduced in the 1870s limited the use of child labour. The Cornish mining system went into terminal decline, leading to a collapse of the local economy and mass emigration both overseas and to other parts of the United Kingdom. In 1891 the number of bal maidens had fallen to half its peak, and by the outbreak of the First World War in 1914 very few remained in employment. In 1921 Dolcoath mine, the last employer of bal maidens, ceased operations, bringing the tradition to an end. Other than women recruited for ore processing at Geevor as a result of labour shortages during the Second World War, and a very few female workers after the Sex Discrimination Act 1975 banned the practice of recruiting only male mineworkers, women never again performed manual labour in Cornish mines. The last surviving bal maiden died in 1968, and with the closure of South Crofty tin mine in 1998, Cornish metals mining came to an end. (Note: As of July 2012 plans were being made to reopen some Cornish metal mines, as rising prices had made Cornish mining economically viable again.)

== Background ==
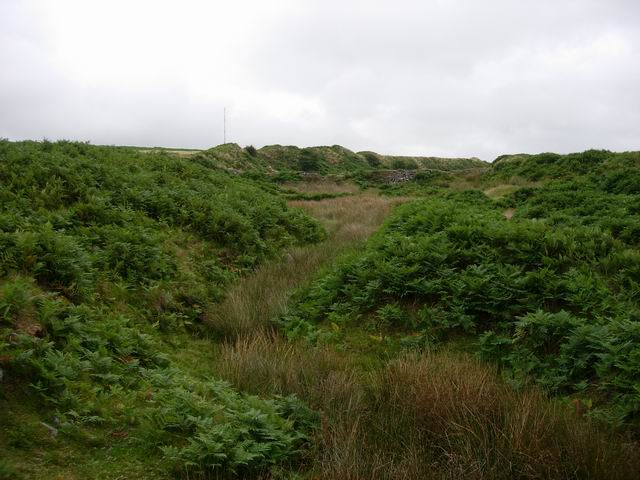
Earthworks near Minions left by tin-streaming (gathering clusters of ore from stream and river beds), (Note: Streaming was the original means of collecting ore which had eroded from mineral deposits and settled on stream and river beds, by collecting ore-bearing pebbles from river and stream beds. During the 19th and early 20th centuries, the tendency of the large-scale surface ore-dressing floors to lose tin particles into surrounding waterways made extraction newly viable on rivers and streams. This was known as 'second streaming'. In 1879 it was estimated that second streaming produced around 12% of Cornwall's tin output. As streaming did not require expensive digging and crushing equipment, it was not uncommon for a streaming operation downstream from a tin mine to be more profitable than the mine itself. Streaming was a very labour-intensive process, with larger streaming operations employing over 200 people apiece, many of whom would have been bal maidens.) the earliest form of mining in Cornwall

For at least 3,000 years from antiquity until the late 20th century, mining of tin and copper played a significant part in the economy of Cornwall. Cornwall, the northern part of Iberia and the Ore Mountains (the modern border between the Czech Republic and Germany) are the only places in Europe in which major tin deposits are found near the surface. As tin is an essential ingredient of bronze, Cornwall was of great economic significance in Bronze Age Europe despite its relative isolation. (Note: Cornwall has been traditionally identified with the Cassiterides ("Tin Islands"), the source of tin for Ancient Greece. See Tin sources and trade in ancient times and Cassiterides for a more detailed explanation of the relationship between the early civilisations of the Mediterranean and the tin-mining areas at the western extremities of Europe, and of competing theories and evidence regarding the location of the Cassiterides.) Mining by the Roman Empire led to the Iberian mines becoming depleted by the 3rd century AD, leaving Cornwall and neighbouring Devon the most significant sources of tin in Europe. While it appears from surviving evidence that after the decline of the Bronze Age civilisations copper production ceased in Cornwall, it seems that the tin mines were in continuous operation throughout the Roman period and the Middle Ages. (Note: The earliest documentary evidence that significant tin mining was taking place in Cornwall and West Devon are 12th century documents relating to the stannary parliament, which represented the area's tin miners. The reference in the 1201 charter of the stannary parliament to the "just and ancient customs and liberties" of the miners implies that significant mining had been ongoing for some time.)

The primitive early mines of Cornwall and Devon probably were operated by local extended families, with the men, women and children all working. Men and boys probably worked both above the surface and below ground, and women and girls worked only above ground; there is no archaeological evidence for women and children working underground in Bronze Age Britain, although some mines from the period contain tunnels so small that only children or very short adults could have worked in them. (Note: That women worked only on the surface, unlike in some of the coal mining areas of the United Kingdom, is thought to be owing to a local tradition that it was unlucky for a female to be underground. This did not prevent Queen Victoria visiting the underground workings on an 1846 visit to Polperro.)

At some point between the death of Cnut the Great in 1035 and the death of Edward the Confessor in early 1066, the independent Kingdom of Cornwall was annexed by the neighbouring Kingdom of Wessex, a part of the Kingdom of England. (Note: The date and exact nature of the annexation of Cornwall by Wessex and England is not recorded. It is known that Cornwall remained independent throughout the reign of Cnut in England (1016–1035), and that the Domesday Book shows Cornwall as being under Wessex control (with the English king the largest landowner) by 1066.) In late 1066 Cornwall, along with the rest of the lands under the control of the English king, was conquered by the Normans and came under the control of William the Conqueror. By the late 12th century the metal mines were brought under the control of the Crown; operation of the tin mines was devolved to the Lord Warden of the Stannaries, and mining of other metals was directly controlled by the Crown as Mines Royal.

=== Female mine workers in the Middle Ages ===
Although women and girls probably worked in mining since antiquity, the earliest known written references to female manual labourers in mining are in the 13th and 14th century records of the royal lead and silver mines at Bere Alston, on the border between Devon and Cornwall. The mines were bordered on three sides by a loop of the River Tamar, the east bank of which has been the traditional boundary between Devon and Cornwall since 936. The mines themselves were on the Devon side of the border at Bere Alston itself, but the surface-level smelters were on the Cornish side at Calstock as there was a readier supply of timber for use in the furnaces.

Although the mining itself was carried out by men, female workers were employed to sort ore for crushing, to prepare the bone ash used as a flux during the smelting process, and for general manual labour. An adult woman was paid up to one penny per day, and young girls between 1/2 and 2/3 of a penny. (Note: Wages in the rural economy of Cornwall, which included substantial elements of barter and subsistence farming and in which few consumer goods were available, do not translate accurately into modern terms. The typical day's pay of a bal maiden prior to the labour reforms of the 1870s was roughly the cost of a loaf of bread. In practice, the earnings of younger workers would typically have been given to their fathers, or all the earnings of a particular team would be paid to the team communally. Older girls and adult women typically paid their families for the costs of their food and lodging, and saved the majority of any surplus for their marriages. Because bal maidens were usually able to live with their families and commute to work, their real incomes tended to be higher than those of domestic servants or farm workers (the other two jobs traditionally open to women), as there was no deduction for board and lodging at their employer's house or farm. Until the practice was outlawed by the Truck Act 1831 it was not unusual for bal maidens to be paid in credit notes or tokens that could only be used in mine-owned shops, rather than in cash.) Miners and other skilled labourers at Bere Alston were recruited from throughout England and Wales, and from the evidence of surnames in the records it appears that many of the female labourers were the wives and daughters of these incomers rather than locally recruited women.

The area's population collapsed both during and after the Black Death. Those miners who had survived the pandemic left mining to work in farming, in which wages had doubled owing to the severe labour shortage, and the mines of Bere Alston were abandoned.

Women and girls were almost certainly employed at the lead and silver mine at Bere Alston, and a few records have also been found of female workers at tin works on Bodmin Moor and around Redruth and Marazion in the 14th century. However, it does not appear that significant numbers of female labourers worked in Cornwall's mining industry until the early 18th century, as no records have yet been discovered for this period. (Note: The absence of any mention of female workers cannot be taken as proof that no women were employed. It is known that mines in continental Europe in this period employed female ore dressers, and it is possible that female ore dressers were employed at some mines and not mentioned in surviving records.)

== Mechanisation and the 18th century copper boom ==
In 1678, Clement Clerke introduced the coal-powered reverberatory furnace, greatly increasing the quantity of metal extractable from ore. The Royal Mines Act 1688 (1 Will. & Mar. c. 30) ended Crown ownership of Cornwall's mines, allowing private investors and local families to begin mining operations. At the same time, the Nine Years' War (1688–97) and the War of the Spanish Succession (1701–14) caused high demand for metals. As a consequence, the Midlands, with easy river and canal access to the coal mines of Wales and northern England and to the metal mines of Cornwall, became a major centre for metallurgy. Ore was shipped from Cornwall up the River Severn to smelters in Gloucestershire where it was refined and sold on to the factories surrounding Birmingham. Financiers and entrepreneurs began investing in and reorganising the mines of Cornwall. With a shortage of manual labour in rural and lightly populated Cornwall, and with a prevalent belief that women and children were best suited to ore separation (which required dexterity and good observation skills but little in the way of physical strength), the large-scale recruitment of women and girls to the mines began. It is around this time that the term "bal maiden" appears to have come into common usage, derived from the Old Cornish bal (mine). A significant proportion of Cornwall's young women quickly became involved in mining; by 1736 the vicar of Ludgvan was complaining that he was unable to hire servants as the young women of the town were "employed about copper".

In around 1720, two key innovations revolutionised the Cornish mining industry. The whim, a horse-powered mechanism for lifting ore to the surface, made mining in deep shafts practical, and the horse-powered pump allowed mining beneath the water table.

=== Role of 18th century bal maidens ===
With the need for expensive machinery and horses and for large numbers of workers at each mine, the traditional operation of mines by extended families or by individual entrepreneurs became impractical, and the new deep-level mines came under the ownership of groups of investors and of mining companies. A group of people known as a "tribute team" (often a single extended family) would bid for the right to work a specified portion of the mine; the men and older boys would dig in the appointed section, and the women, girls and young boys would dress the ore sent up by the men. (Note: The tribute team system is rarely found in mining outside Cornwall. It is thought to derive from the unusual economic structure of Cornwall which had no large towns or cities and thus less division of labour than other mining areas; while miners elsewhere were generally full-time employees, Cornish mine labourers were often farmers or fishermen supplementing their income in the fallow seasons. While the tribute teams who extracted the ore were independent of the mine, the workers who actually dug the mine shafts ('tutworkers') were employed directly by the mine.) In later years the practice of bal maidens dressing only the ore sent up by the men of their tribute team was abandoned, and they would instead be paid a flat wage by the mine owner to dress any ore sent up, and the tribute team which had sent up the ore would be billed for the work done. Typical work for a bal maiden in this period was picking ore from rubble, breaking and separating the ore, and carrying ore and metal. Generally girls under 12 would sort the ore, older girls would separate the ore, and grown women would carry out the heavy manual labour of breaking rocks with hammers and of transporting ore between various pieces of apparatus. As the bal maidens of the smaller tribute teams often did not have the time to dress all the ore sent up, or it was not financially worthwhile to pay for the poorer quality ore to be processed, large quantities of poor quality ore were discarded unprocessed in waste heaps. On those occasions when improved extraction techniques or rises in the price of metals made it worthwhile to process this discarded ore, sometimes separate tribute teams would bid for the right to dress and process this rubble. As the practice of using tribute teams declined in the early 19th century, the mine owners themselves would hire bal maidens to dress this waste ore.

Records from the Pool Adit copper mine at Trevenson (the most successful of the early copper mines) show in 1729, 25 bal maidens and three males worked as 'pickers' sorting high quality from poor quality ore, earning a flat rate of 4d per day and typically working 20 days per month. (Records do not show the ages of the pickers at Pool Adit, but the male pickers are likely to have been boys too young for heavy labour.) In 1730 Pool Adit employed 30 female and four male pickers, and by 1731 the figures had risen to 55 female and five male, typically working 22 to 26 days per month. The number of bal maidens employed in the industry rose dramatically, and by the early 1770s Dolcoath, by then the most significant of the Cornish copper mines, employed around 220 bal maidens on the copper dressing floors alone.

It appears that during the 18th century copper boom, it was customary throughout the Cornish mining industry to use bal maidens purely as casual labour. There are no records of bal maidens being contracted to a particular mine or paid a piece-rate for the amount of work done. Instead, mine accounts invariably show them being paid a fixed daily rate and employed only as and when they were needed. When poor weather conditions made surface-level work impossible, water shortages meant water-powered machinery could not operate, or accidents in the mines caused a temporary closure, the bal maidens would be suspended.

In the 1770s and 1780s the discovery of copper at Parys Mountain in Anglesey which could be cheaply extracted by opencast mining led to a crash in the copper price, and expensive deep mining began to become unviable. As the copper boom came to an end, the mines began to close. In 1788 mining ceased at Dolcoath itself, although some bal maidens continued to be employed picking through the large quantities of ore which had already been brought to the surface.

== Industrialisation and the 19th century copper boom ==
At the end of the 18th century, the copper mining industry of North Wales centred around Parys Mountain declined, and the depression in the British copper market ended. As the price rose, the Cornish mines began to reopen. By this time, the Industrial Revolution had begun, bringing with it new attitudes towards organisation and efficiency. While the mine managers of the 18th century generally treated bal maidens as useful only for breaking and sorting ore, the managers of these new mines sought to use all their employees as efficiently as possible.

We went off on Wednesday to the mines, which were quite a new scene to me and the whole process is very curious and interesting, the boys pushing the little carts full of ore on rails. The little girls washing and picking out the best parts, the bigger ones beating it with hammers all the time, thirty nine in a row, was a very pretty thing. They were all singing hymns which sounded so beautiful, and they looked so blooming and healthy from being so much in the air, so different from the appearance of the manufacturing classes in Glasgow.

— Lucy Fitzgerald (wife of explorer George Francis Lyon) describing Gwennap, December 1825

While 18th century metal mines had worked on the principle of adult men digging the ore and women and children picking and cobbing the ore ready for smelting, in the new large-scale mines of the early 19th century working practices changed. The strenuous underground work was still carried out by male workers, as was breaking large rocks with heavy hammers ('ragging'). In copper mines, very young girls, and sick and injured older women, carried out the simple work of picking. Girls in their late teens forced the broken ore through a broad mesh to sort the ore ('riddling'), and used hammers to break the large chunks of ore left by the riddling process into smaller chunks. Girls in their mid-teens cobbed the resulting chunks, separating the valuable ore from waste rock. Grown women would carry out the heavy manual labour of breaking rocks with hammers ('spalling'), of crushing sorted ore to small grains ready for smelting ('bucking') and of transporting ore between various pieces of apparatus. An experienced bal maiden working as a spaller would produce approximately one ton (2240 lb; 1016 kg) of broken ore per day, depending on the type of stone. In the tin mines, in which ore could be crushed far more finely than copper before smelting, cobbing and bucking did not take place. Instead, the chunks of spalled ore were mechanically stamped to fine grains, and washed into a series of collecting pits to separate the coarse 'rough' from the fine 'slimes'. The resulting rough and slimes were separated out on large wooden frames ('buddling' and 'framing' respectively), to extract the tin ore from the surrounding dust and grit.

Following the introduction of the mechanical ore crusher in 1804 the tasks traditionally carried out by bal maidens began to be mechanised. Despite this, the rapid growth of the mines in comparison to the slow spread of mechanisation meant the number of bal maidens appears to have risen steadily, although statistics for the number of women employed in the mines in the early days of industrialisation are incomplete and a few are contradictory.

=== Total numbers ===
Because records from the period are incomplete and inconsistent in format, the total number of bal maidens working in this period is unclear. Estimates for the total number employed at the end of the 18th century range from 1,200 to 5,000, with women and children constituting up to half the total number of people working in copper mining and a lower proportion in the less labour-intensive tin mining. Mayers (2008) estimates that at a minimum 55,000 women and girls in total worked as bal maidens between 1720 and 1921, based on an estimate of each working an average of 10 years, with the number peaking in the early 1860s at at least 7,000. The actual figures are likely to have been considerably higher; not all mines recorded male and female workers separately, and after 1872 there may have been deliberate under-reporting of the number of children working, owing to legal restrictions on their employment. These estimates do not include female workers performing non-manual administrative work at the mines, nor those in related industries such as slate and china clay quarrying.

Although the proportion of bal maidens in the workforce fell steadily, the mining boom of the first half of the 19th century took the total number to between 4,000 and 14,400 by the 1840s. The 1841 Census (the first full census of England) shows 3,250 women working in the mines, but the mine returns of the same year show over 5,000 women in the tin, lead and copper mines of Cornwall and West Devon. Increased mechanisation of the ore dressing process and public concerns over subjecting women and children to the harsh working conditions of the mines meant that the proportion of bal maidens in the workforce continued to fall, and it is generally accepted that by 1850 between 15 and 20% of mine workers were female. By the 1861 census, coinciding with the peak of the Cornish mining industry, a minimum of 6,000 women were working in mining in Cornwall, at least 2,500 of whom worked within a five-mile radius of Camborne. Although employed primarily in copper and tin mines, bal maidens also worked in lead, zinc, manganese, iron, antimony, wolfram, and uranium mines, and in slate and china clay quarries.

=== Typical work ===
Bal maidens with traditional tools and protective clothing spalling ore, 1858

Women typically began working at the mines at around the age of 10 or 11, although there are some cases of girls starting work at as young as six, and in areas such as Camborne with a high demand for workers it was not unusual for girls to start work at age seven or eight. (Charles Foster Barham's enquiry of 1841 found an average age for starting work of 12.) Until the 1870s Cornwall was largely unaffected by legislation which limited child labour in mines elsewhere in the United Kingdom, and the typical ages of bal maidens remained virtually unchanged between the 1841 census and the 1871 census. Women would typically remain at the mine until they married; while this generally meant that they stopped working at between the ages of 19 and 24, it was not unusual for unmarried women and widows to continue working into their 60s and 70s; and a 93-year-old bal maiden was recorded in the 1891 census. A typical working day would last from 7.00 am to 5.00 pm in summer and from dawn to dusk in winter, (ore dressing by candle-light was not cost effective) with a lunch break of either half an hour or an hour at noon. (Note: For about two weeks in every eight, the dressed ore would be assayed and prepared for sale, a process known as sampling. During sampling weeks, the working day would begin at 6.00 am and possibly not finish until 8.00 pm.) Lunch typically consisted of pasties, hoggans (hard pasties made with unleavened barley flour and filled with pork, potato or dried fruit) or fish eaten cold or warmed in ovens attached to the mine's furnaces, along with mugwort or pennyroyal tea, and it was not usual even for workers who lived near their workplace to go home for meals. Although still not paid on a piece-rate basis, each bal maiden would be expected to meet a daily quota to earn her pay; some mines operated on the basis that once the quota had been met the bal maidens were allowed to go home, meaning the working day could finish up to two hours early. Although at a few tin mines at which water-powered machinery was in continuous operation bal maidens would work seven days a week, in the vast majority of the industry they were not expected to work on Sundays. As well as the religious holidays observed in the rest of the United Kingdom, Cornish miners also celebrated St Piran's Day (5 March) and Chewidden Thursday (the Thursday before Christmas), purportedly the day on which St Piran rediscovered tin-smelting. Other than religious holidays and parish feast days, Cornish miners had no holidays until labour reforms in the early 20th century.

Typical pay in the 1840s and 1850s would be 4d per day for younger girls, rising to 8d–1s per day for full-grown women engaged in skilled bucking work. (Wages varied by region owing to differing levels of supply and demand for workers; in Kea and Wendron the average wage for women and girls was as high as 18s in 1841.) As they were employed as casual labour, bal maidens were not tied to any particular mine, and it was not unusual for them to transfer to other mines offering better pay or conditions. Some mines may have paid a monthly loyalty bonus in an effort to retain their workers. The workers could be fined for bad language, failure to work hard enough, absenteeism and other misdemeanours. As their pay was dependent on the profitability of the mine, it was not unusual early in the 19th century for bal maidens to work for long periods (in at least one case, a laundry woman, 11 months) without pay, and to receive their pay in arrears once the mine returned to profit. While some younger bal maidens would attend school before starting work and, in 1841, around a quarter of bal maidens attended Sunday schools, illiteracy was rife. When Charles Foster Barham's reported to the 1842 Royal Commission into the Employment of Children at the Mines he found that less than half of bal maidens he interviewed were able to read to any extent. Some mines subsidised basic education for the children of their employees. Mining families generally valued education so highly that they would often try to send at least one child to school, but any education children did receive tended to be curtailed once they became old enough to work in the mines.

The Cornish bal maidens formed a class of workwomen to themselves, a class, as a whole, shrewd, honest, respectable and hard-working. Though sometimes rough in speech and generally plain-spoken enough in repartee, as anyone who addressed them disrespectfully soon found, their work brought with it no demoralisation of character.

— Kenneth Hamilton Jenkin, The Cornish Miner, 1927.

Unlike the coal mines of Wales and northern England, the Cornish mines generally did not provide housing for their workers, largely owing to the casual nature of work under the tribute team system. Bal maidens would typically travel to the mines from their family homes, some families building homes near the mine. (Until the inclosure acts of the late 18th and early 19th centuries, anyone moving to an area had the right to build a house on common land, provided they could build it overnight.) They would generally remain living with their families until marriage. (Much of early 19th century Cornwall retained the old custom of 'keeping company', by which a couple would not be formally married until the woman became pregnant, and the woman would continue to work and to live with her family until that time.) While some lived at or near the mine at which they worked, mine workers typically walked three to four miles (five to seven km) to and from work each day. The miners' cottages were generally crowded and squalid, sometimes with ten or more people living in each small cottage, while the abstraction of the region's water supplies for use in the mines led to serious problems with sanitation and the provision of fresh water.

During the European food crisis of the 1840s, food prices rose sharply to around three times the pre-crisis prices, and the relatively low-paid bal maidens of Devon Great Consols demanded increased pay to cover food costs. While the mine owners initially met their demands, once the food price stabilised the pay rate was then reduced to previous levels causing around 200 bal maidens and boys to walk out. On their return to work the next day all the striking workers were summarily dismissed and either replaced with new workers, or re-hired at an even lower pay rate than before. Bal maidens went on strike on at least six other occasions in the 19th century, (Note: Balleswidden in 1857, Dolcoath in 1871, Wheal Basset and Ding Dong in 1872, West Seton in 1877, and again at Devon Great Consols in 1878; the legalisation of trade unions in 1871 made strikes and other industrial action more common from the 1870s onwards.) but Cornwall's high unemployment meant the strikes were generally unsuccessful as workers could easily be replaced.

=== Working conditions ===
Miners and bal maidens with typical equipment and protective clothing at Dolcoath, 1890

From the 1840s onwards, more mines provided crude shelters to protect surface workers from the worst of the weather, but at many others work at surface-level took place in the open air. Workers were generally expected to remain at their posts except in the most extreme weather conditions. Bal maidens wore gooks, a specialised bonnet which covered the shoulders and extended over the face to protect from rain, bright sunlight, flying debris and loud noise. In the winter the gook was made of felt, and in summer of cotton. Working in close proximity to heavy industrial machinery, they wore shorter dresses or skirts than the ankle-length clothing typical of the period, and their exposed lower legs were wrapped in protective coverings. Their arms were sometimes protected by hessian sleeves worn over their clothes. Some bal maidens working in cobbing and bucking wore rubber tubing on the fingers of one hand as protection from their hammer. While working bal maidens wore a waist-length hessian apron ('towser') over their clothes, and those who could afford it would have a white herden (flax and hemp) apron for wearing to and from work. These working clothes were accessorised with flowers, bows, ribbons, jewellery and other decoration. Until the end of the 19th century the working clothing of a bal maiden changed very little.

Although less dangerous than work below ground, some bal maidens suffered poor health. Tuberculosis and bronchitis were endemic in the mining communities, and would be exacerbated by constant exposure to high levels of mineral dust. Constant work with damp ore might have led to rheumatic problems. The extraction of arsenic from the tin and copper ores sometimes led to exposure to arsenic fumes. Constant bending, lifting, and carrying often led to muscular strains. The need to hold chunks of ore with one hand while hammering them with the other led to some bal maidens suffering permanent damage to their left hands. The noise generated by industrial machinery, particularly after the introduction of the steam engine, could cause hearing difficulties, with some groups of bal maidens developing private sign languages. Noxious fumes, notably arsenic, lead and antimony could cause digestive problems, bowel disorders and amenorrhoea and other disruptions of the reproductive system. Barley hoggans also caused digestive problems.

The hard work is not the greatest calamity of which we complain, that is a mere physical evil; what we most deplore is, that when called to take upon themselves the duties of wife and mother they are totally unfit for them. How can the moral standard of society amongst the lower orders be raised by mothers and sisters of such education and example?

— George Henwood, writing in 1857.

While some of the larger mines provided separate eating areas for bal maidens, others obliged male and female workers to eat together, a cause of consternation among some observers concerned that exposure to the "coarse joking" and "rude behaviour" of men had a negative effect on the "modesty and delicacy" expected of women. Other contemporary concerns were that heavy protective clothing led them to be unfeminine, that working in the constant view of men caused the bal maidens to have an unhealthy interest in their own appearance and attractiveness, that spending long hours at work meant that they did not have time to learn the skills to be good housewives. (Barham's 1841 investigations found no evidence to the claim that bal maidens grew up to be poor housewives, concluding that "they are for the most part tender mothers and industrious wives [and] the laborious occupations to which they have been inured make household duties appear comparatively light".) Other contemporary observers noted that bal maidens were generally good natured and well behaved, and often devoutly religious, but it is well-documented that bal maidens typically took great pride in their own appearance and clothing. Many contemporary observers commented on the high fashion of the clothing worn by bal maidens on Sundays and holidays; although the disposable income of a bal maiden was low, they would sometimes form "dress clubs" to buy fashionable clothing which they would take turns wearing. (Note: Mayers (2008) observes that it needs to be taken into account that contemporary writers discussing the high spending of bal maidens on clothing and entertainment would likely have been influenced by mine owners and managers, who had an interest in ensuring their employees were perceived as well-paid and profligate with their earnings. However, it is well-documented that those bal maidens who had also had other jobs often seem to have preferred work at the mines.)

Despite the hardships and relatively low pay, Barham's 1841 investigation into the Cornish mining industry found that bal maidens generally enjoyed their work, and that those who had been in other jobs tended to prefer work at the mines. Mining had shorter hours than domestic service and was less affected by seasonal variations than farm working, the other two jobs employing significant numbers of women, and it was far easier for workers to live at home and travel to work each day, rather than lodging in their master's house or on a remote farm. Outdoor work was considered healthier than work in enclosed and smoky mines and factories, and it was sometimes believed that women who had worked as bal maidens from a young age were healthier than they would otherwise have been. From the 1780s onwards Cornwall suffered severe unemployment and poverty, and there were always large numbers of women and girls volunteering for work at the mines. The practice of giving preference to the wives, widows and children of dead or invalid miners allowed families to remain in their local area and to avoid destitution following the loss of the family's main breadwinner; work as a bal maiden also provided an opportunity for girls and young women to escape workhouses and gain financial independence. (As well as the benefits to the community of giving work to the families of invalid or dead miners, recruitment from within mining families benefited the mine owners also. The wives and children of miners could be expected to understand mining terminology and techniques, and would generally have been regular visitors to the mines delivering food to their husbands and thus be familiar with the mine's layout.)

== Decline ==
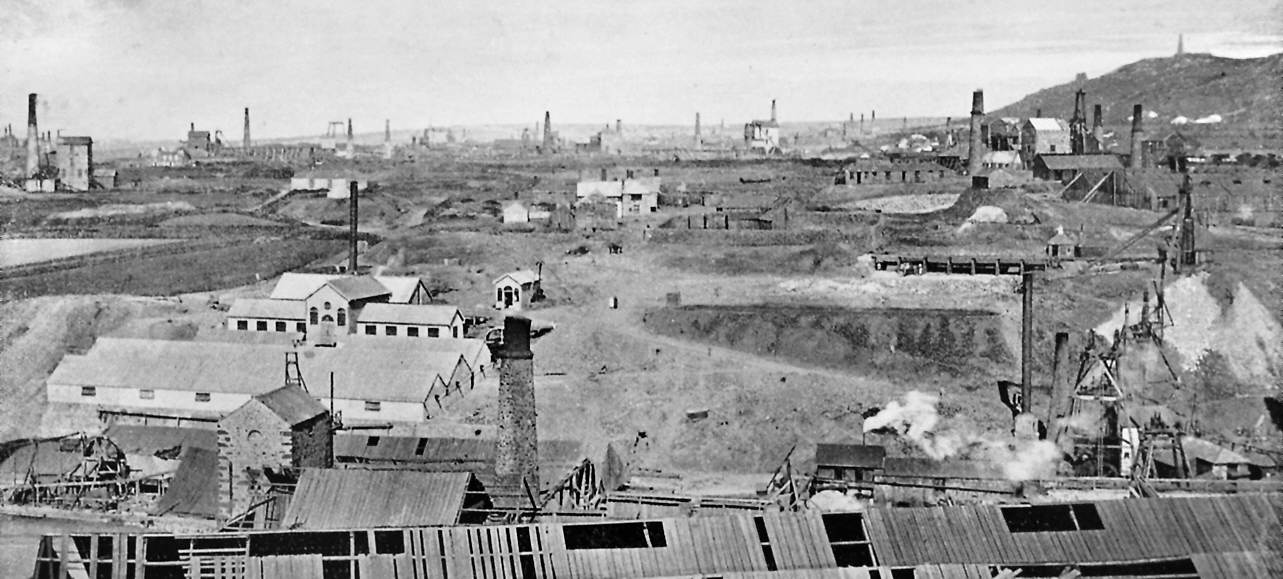
Dolcoath, the largest and deepest of Cornwall's mines, at the peak of its tin production in 1893. Dolcoath was the last significant mine in Cornwall to employ traditional bal maidens.

In around 1865, faced with increased competition from overseas mines and with the most productive copper mines becoming exhausted, the Cornish mining industry went into terminal decline. By 1880 the level of Cornish copper production was at around a quarter of its 1860 level. As production fell, the numbers of employees in the mines fell with it. Much of the copper industry collapsed, causing a movement within Cornwall from the copper to the tin mining. While some bal maidens continued to work at the mines, many worked in tin streaming in the rivers and streams flowing from the tin mining areas. In those copper mines which survived, investment in new machinery virtually ceased, so employment of some bal maidens continued. The tin industry, which was still economically successful, began to invest in new machinery to replace manual ore dressing, drastically reducing the number of female workers. (Note: The new machines were usually operated by male rather than female workers. It was calculated that a single mechanical crusher operated by a man or boy could put between 20 and 30 women and girls out of work.) By 1870 the number of bal maidens in work had fallen by around 50%.

At the same time as the Cornish mining industry went into decline, public opposition to the use of female and child labour in mines was rising. The Metalliferous Mines Regulation Act 1872 (35 & 36 Vict. c. 77) brought the mines of Cornwall under the provisions of the Mines Act 1842, which had previously applied only to coal mines, limiting the use of child labour in the mines and thus increasing costs. The Act prohibited women from working underground, which the bal maidens did not do, but it also forbade any child under ten from working in any mine, even on the surface. The passing of the Factory and Workshop Act 1878 drastically limited the use of female and child labour. (Note: Unlike the coal mines of Wales and northern England, in the metal mines of Cornwall and Devon women and children worked only at surface level. Consequently, they had not been affected by the Mines and Collieries Act 1842, which banned women and children from working underground.) The employment of children under 10 was banned outright, the maximum working hours for children aged 10–14 were drastically restricted, and women were banned from working over 56 hours per week. The sudden loss of cheap child labourers made the already weakened mining industries of Cornwall and West Devon even less profitable, and more than half the mines in the area went out of business in the following decade. Some bal maidens continued to work in surviving mines and in tin-streaming, but instability in the metal markets made what remained of the mining industries increasingly unviable. In the 1880s William Ewart Gladstone's Liberal government tried to ban female labour from mines altogether; although the Bill was defeated, the number of bal maidens continued to fall. At the 1891 census the number of working bal maidens had fallen to around half its 1850s–60s peak. By 1895 only 23 mines remained operational compared to 307 in 1873, and in 1901 Devon Great Consols, the last significant copper mine in Devon and Cornwall, closed. Electrification and the introduction of Frue Vanners at the surviving mines replaced most of the jobs still done by women, and by the outbreak of the First World War in 1914 very few bal maidens remained in employment. With wartime shortages of raw materials and many younger men in the armed forces, some bal maidens were employed to dress orthoclase feldspar at the re-opened 'Polpuff Glass Mine', now better known as Tresayes Quarry Nature Reserve, near Roche in the St Austell district, and others were employed to re-dress the existing spoil heaps of defunct mines for wolfram and arsenic.

=== Emigration and economic collapse ===
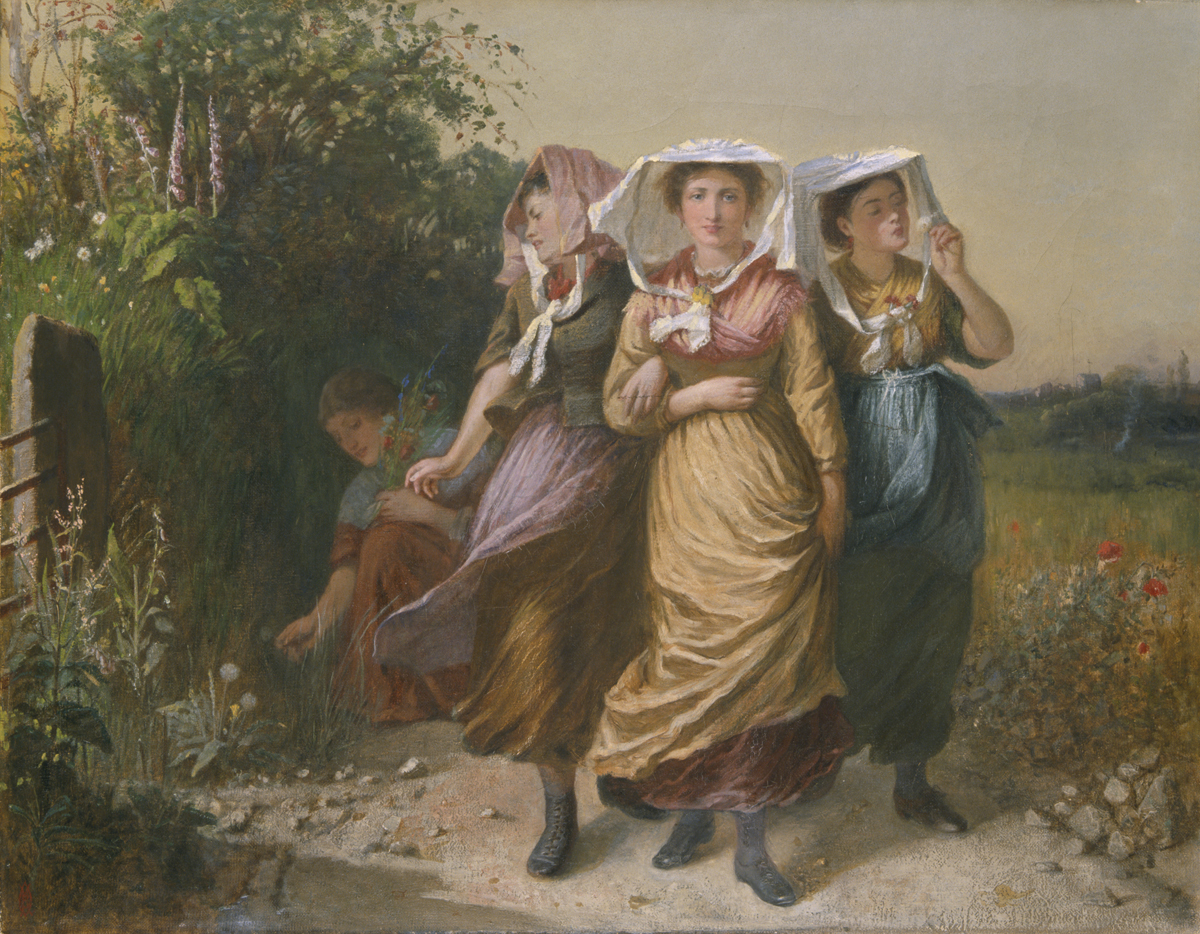
"The bal maidens"; Emily Mary Osborn

As the metal mining industry on which it depended declined, and prices for staple goods rose sharply resulting from fluctuations in food prices and of the American Civil War, the economy of Cornwall collapsed. Large numbers of Cornish families emigrated to mining districts in other countries and other parts of the United Kingdom; in some former mining districts as much as 3/4 of the young people moved out in the 20 years following the closure of the local mines. Between 1861 and 1900 at least 35% of Cornish women aged 15–24 moved to other parts of the UK, and over 26% left the country altogether. Although the male emigrants generally found work in mines in their new places of settlement, or put their mining skills to use digging tunnels for the rapidly growing railway networks, the jobs traditionally done by bal maidens, where they still existed, were usually done by locally recruited men or boys, and the tradition of female Cornish mine labour died out in emigrant families. (Note: Some mines and collieries in the Midlands and northern England employed pit brow lasses, female workers who moved wagons between pit-head and screens or picked over coal on the screens. These mines probably gave preference to the families of local miners and no records of Cornish bal maidens being employed there have yet been found.)

While a few former bal maidens found alternative employment at local factories, and large numbers emigrated, the unemployment situation in Cornwall remained bad. As early as the 1860s, charitable schemes had begun for training former bal maidens as domestic servants, and as the textile industry of the North of England boomed a concerted effort was made to recruit Cornish women to work in the mills. Large numbers of women took up these offers; the 1891 census showed 17,757 Cornish women living in Devon (the majority working in domestic service), 10,005 in London and the surrounding suburbs of Middlesex, and 4,439 in Lancashire. In addition, the towns growing around the newly discovered mines of South Australia suffered a serious gender imbalance and made concerted efforts to recruit Cornish women.

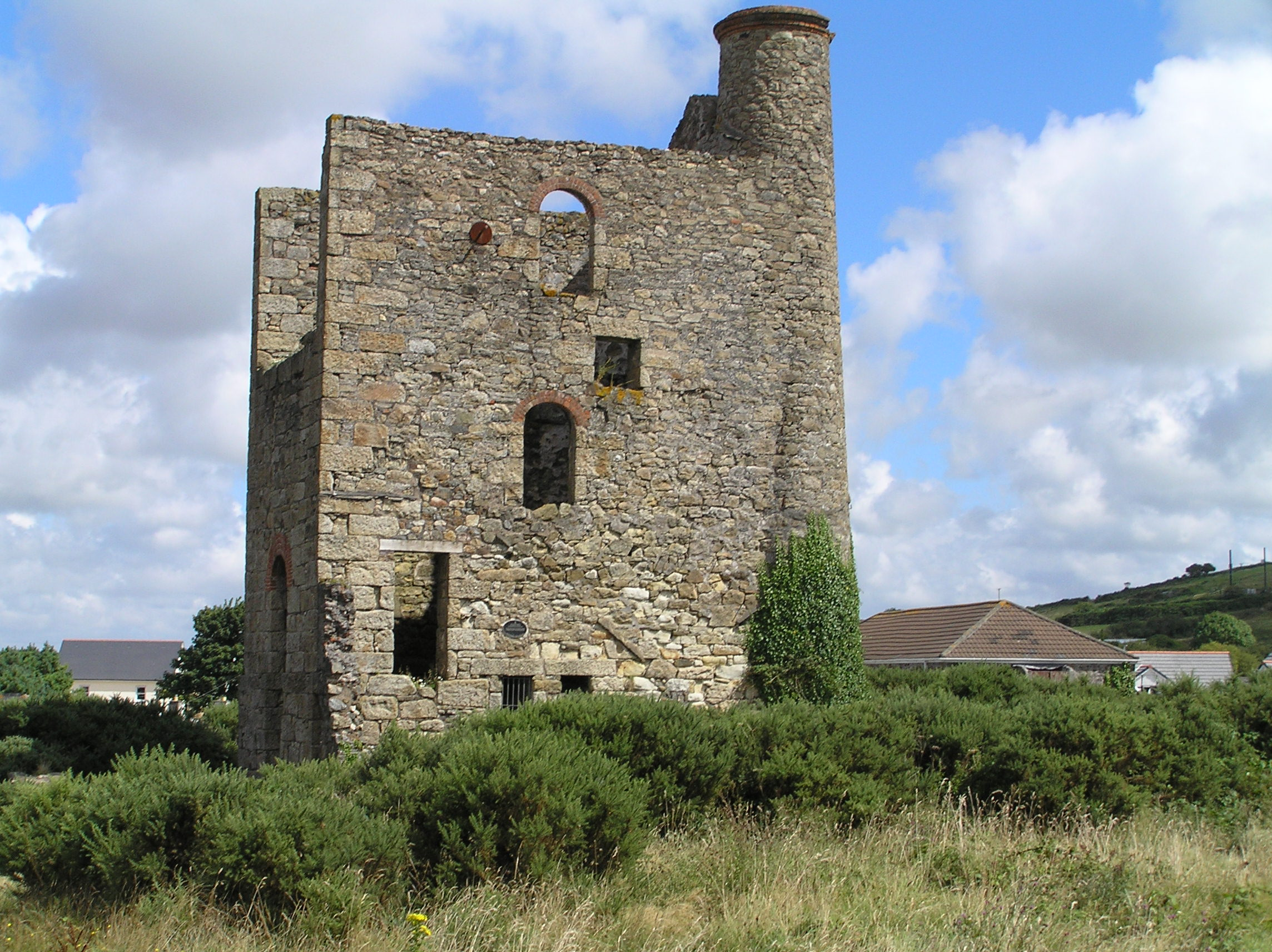
The ruins of Dolcoath, 85 years after the mine's closure

By the end of the First World War most of the more complicated tasks in the remaining mines had been mechanised, and those bal maidens who remained in work were restricted to simple manual labour of physically moving ore, spalling and overseeing the buddling frames. A successful 1919 Workers' Union campaign for a minimum 30s per week wage in the industry virtually doubled the wages of the few remaining bal maidens in Cornwall. Those at Dolcoath were made redundant within weeks of this increase. Dolcoath, the last mine in Cornwall to employ traditional bal maidens, closed in 1921, bringing the centuries-old tradition to an end. (The end of the use of bal maidens did not mean the end of female workers in those mines that survived; women continued to work in administrative roles until the final collapse of the Cornish mining industry in the late 20th century.)

=== After the closures ===
During the Second World War, Britain suffered severe shortages of raw materials. While consideration was given to reopening the closed mines, this was not deemed viable and instead the few remaining mines increased their production. As many male workers were away on military service, some women were briefly employed in tin-picking at Geevor, and in ore-dressing at the Great Rock iron mine on Dartmoor, during and after the war until around 1952. Other than a very limited number of female workers after the Sex Discrimination Act 1975 ended the policy of recruiting only men for underground work in the few surviving mines, the Geevor pickers were the last female manual labourers in the Cornish mining industry.

Minnie Andrews (born in Camborne in 1874), who had begun work as a racker at the age of nine, was believed to have been the last surviving former bal maiden (other than the Geevor pickers), when she died in March 1968. In 1998 South Crofty, Europe's last operational tin mine, closed, bringing metal mining in Cornwall to an end.

== See also ==
- Pit brow women – women working coalfields in England
- Cornwall and West Devon Mining Landscape
- Dartmoor tin-mining
- Geology of Cornwall
