= Gunnis (surname) =

Gunnis is a surname of Anglo-Saxon origin. Notable people with the surname include:

- J. Gunnis Davis (born 21 December 1873 – 23 March 1937) British-American actor and director
- Rupert Gunnis (born 11 March 1899 – 31 July 1965) British art historian, collector and author

== See also ==
- Gunnies
- Gunnis Creek
