= Gook (headgear) =

Piece of protective headgear worn by bal maidens

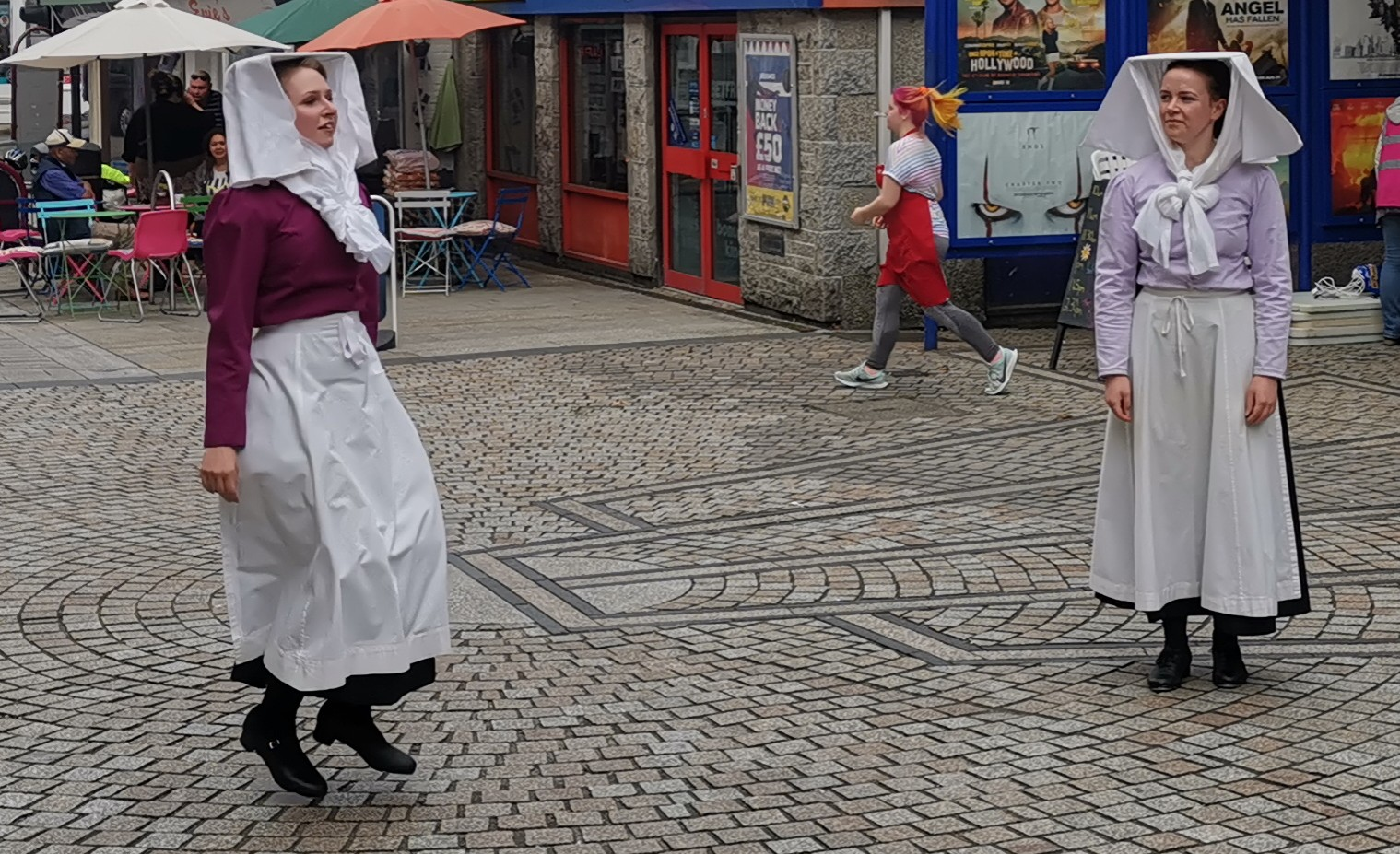
Cornish dancers wearing Gooks with stiffened cardboard

Bal maidens wearing gooks, 1890

A gook was a piece of protective headgear worn by bal maidens (female manual labourers in the mining industries of Cornwall and Devon). The gook was a bonnet which covered the head and projected forward over the face, to protect the wearer's head and face from sunlight and flying debris. Bal maidens often worked outdoors or in very crude surface-level shelters, and the gook also gave protection from extreme weather conditions. By covering the ears, gooks protected the ears from the noisy industrial environment.

While there was some regional variation in style, gooks would generally be tied under the chin and around the neck, and fall loose from the neck over the shoulders to protect the shoulders and upper arms. In bright sunlight, the wearer would sometimes pin the gook across her face, leaving only the eyes exposed. Gooks for use in winter were made of felt or padded cotton with cardboard stiffening to allow the top to project forward over the face, and in summer of cotton. Although gooks were traditionally white in colour, the lightweight summer gooks were sometimes made of bright cotton prints.

In the 19th century bal maidens began to wear straw hats in summer instead of cotton gooks. By the end of the 19th century, these straw bonnets had largely replaced the gook year-round. By this time the Cornish mining industry was in terminal decline, and very few bal maidens remained in employment.

Bal maidens in gooks and protective clothing, 1858

When some bal maidens were re-hired to work in a temporarily expanded mining industry during the First World War (1914–18), traditional clothing was abandoned and gooks were largely replaced by more practical wool or fur hats. Gooks did not die out completely, and records exist of at least some bal maidens continuing to wear the gook until the early 1920s.

In 1921 Dolcoath, the last mine in Cornwall to employ female manual labourers, was closed, and the use of bal maidens ceased. (Note: The end of the use of bal maidens did not mean the end of female workers in those mines that survived; women continued to work in administrative roles until the final collapse of the Cornish mining industry in the late 20th century. See Mayers, Dangerous Place, p. 30 and Mayers, Bal Maidens, p. 164.) Although some female manual labourers were employed by the mines in the 1940s and early 1950s owing to labour shortages caused by the Second World War, and a very limited number of female workers were employed after the Sex Discrimination Act 1975 ended the policy of recruiting only men for underground work in the few surviving mines, these women wore practical clothing similar to those of male workers. In 1998 Cornwall's last surviving tin mine at South Crofty closed, bringing mining in Devon and Cornwall to an end. (Note: As of July 2012 plans were being made to reopen some Cornish metal mines, as rising prices had made Cornish mining economically viable again. See Gallacher.)

== See also ==
- Mining helmet

== Bibliography ==
- Buckley, Allen (2010). Cornish Bal Maidens. Penryn: Tor Mark. ISBN 978-085025-420-4. OCLC 688361470.
- Gallacher, Neil (20 July 2012). "New operations chief for South Crofty mine". BBC News.
- Mayers, Lynne (2008). A Dangerous Place to Work! Women & Children of the Devon & Cornwall Mining Industries 1300 to 1970. Cinderford: Blaize Bailey Books. ISBN 978-0-9556896-0-4. OCLC 688362135.
- Mayers, Lynne (2008) [2004]. Bal Maidens: Women and Girls of the Cornwall and Devon Mines (2nd ed.). Cinderford: Blaize Bailey Books. ISBN 978-0-9556896-1-1. OCLC 663435621. (1st edition published 2004 by The Hypatia Trust, Penzance as Balmaidens)
