= Rib pillar =

In mining, a rib pillar separates one stope from the other and is aligned transverse of the stope, perpendicular to the strike. It is used in mines to increase the strata stability of the stope and support the raises, winzes or shaft of the mine.
