= Criggan =

Coordinates: 50.4117°N 4.7957°W

Criggan: Cornish: Krugan
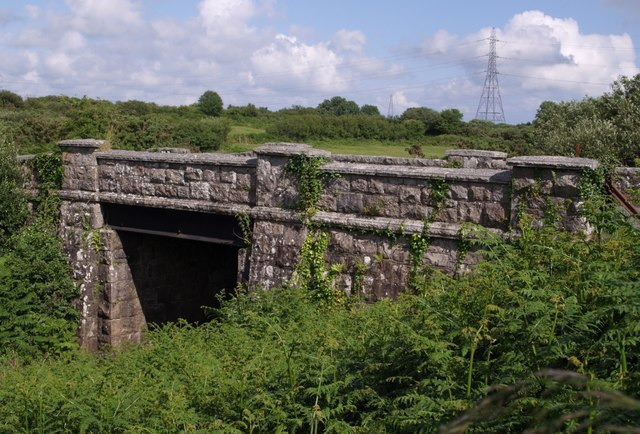
- Railway bridge at Criggan

- Location within Cornwall
- OS grid reference: SX014606
- Civil parish: Roche
- Unitary authority: Cornwall
- Ceremonial county: Cornwall
- Region: South West
- Country: England
- Sovereign state: United Kingdom
- Post town: ST. AUSTELL
- Postcode district: PL26
- Dialling code: 01726
- Police: Devon and Cornwall
- Fire: Cornwall
- Ambulance: South Western
- UK Parliament: St Austell and Newquay

Criggan (Cornish: Krugan, meaning either little barrow or simply the barrow) is a hamlet in Cornwall, England, UK, located north of the village of Bugle. It lies on the edge of Criggan Moor, within an Area of Great Scientific Value. It lies along the railway line from Victoria and Roche railway station in the west to Bugle in the south. It is in the civil parish of Roche.

The settlement is mentioned in Herman Melville's short story "The Lightning-Rod Man", included in The Piazza Tales (1856), which says 'In Criggan last month, I put up three-and-twenty rods on only five buildings.' 'Let me see. Was it not at Criggan last week, about midnight on Saturday, that the steeple, the big elm and the assembly-room cupola were struck?.'

== Notable people ==
- Claudius Criggan - Bishop of Sodor and Man in 1784, died in 1813.
