= Bilberry, Cornwall =

Hamlet in Cornwall, just outside the Village of Bugle England

Coordinates: 50.4059°N 4.7868°W

Bilberry: Cornish: Krugbylla
- Location within Cornwall
- OS grid reference: SX021599
- Civil parish: Roche
- Unitary authority: Cornwall
- Ceremonial county: Cornwall
- Region: South West
- Country: England
- Sovereign state: United Kingdom
- Post town: ST AUSTELL
- Postcode district: PL26
- Dialling code: 01726
- Police: Devon and Cornwall
- Fire: Cornwall
- Ambulance: South Western
- UK Parliament: St Austell and Newquay

Bilberry (Cornish: Krugbylla) is a rural hamlet in mid Cornwall, England, United Kingdom, on the outskirts of the village of Bugle. It is approximately five miles (8 km) north of St Austell on the B3278 (formerly the A391) in the china clay extraction area. It is in the civil parish of Roche.
