= Load, haul, dump machine =

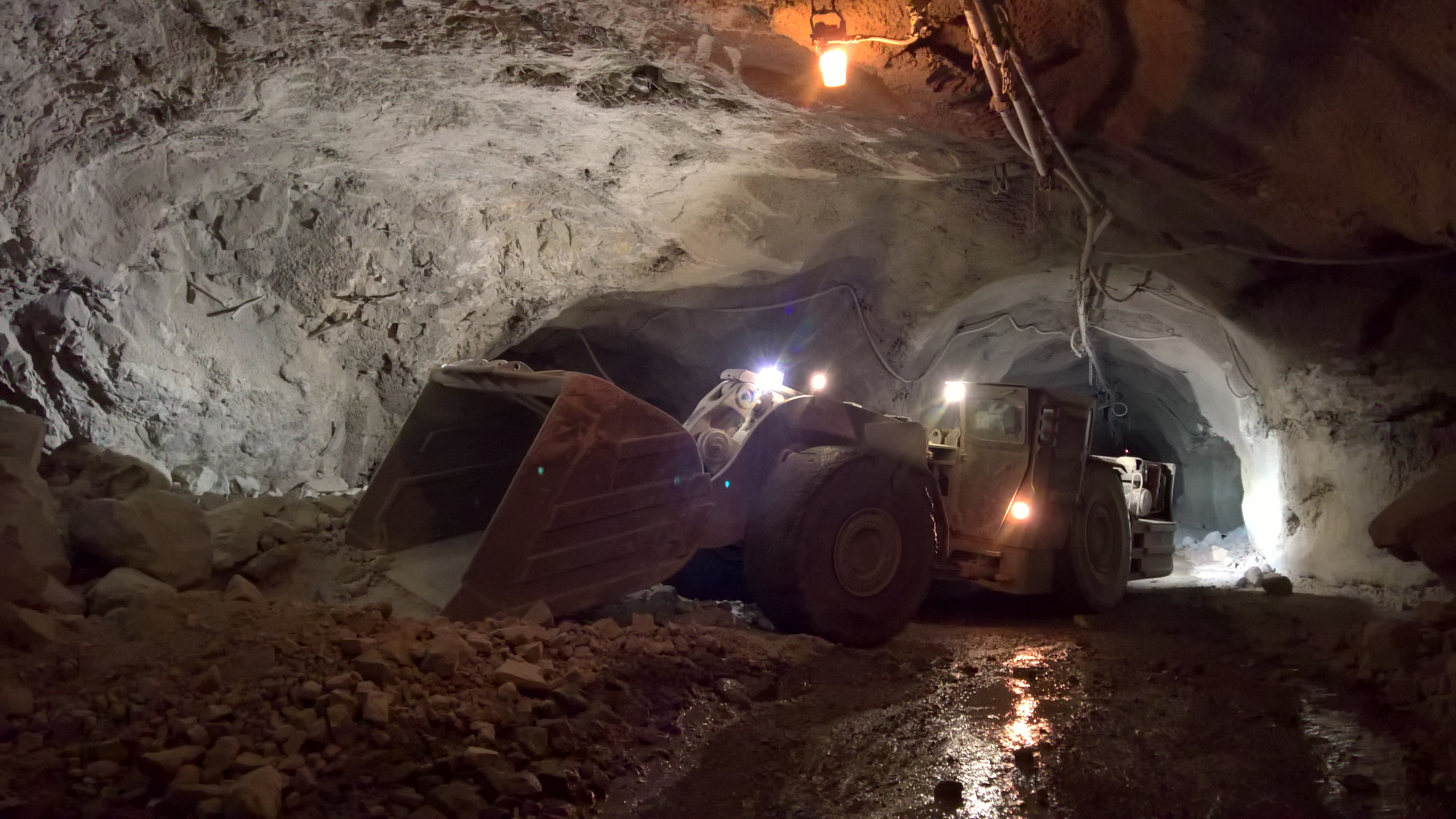
CAT Model R1700G LHD

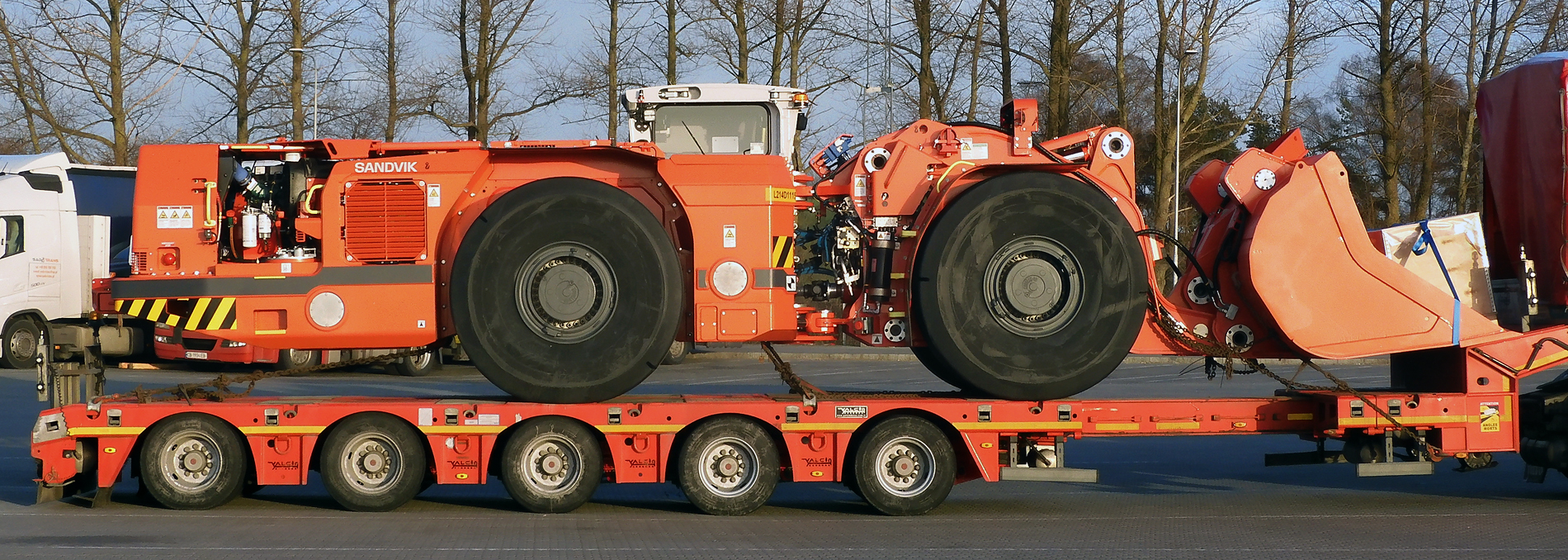
LH 514 from Sandvik.

LHD (load, haul, dump) loaders are similar to conventional front end loaders but developed for the toughest of hard rock mining applications, keeping overall production economy, safety, and reliability in consideration. They are extremely rugged, highly maneuverable, and exceptionally productive. More than 75% of the world's underground metal mines use LHD for handling the muck of their excavations.

== Constructional details ==
LHDs have powerful prime movers, advanced drive train technology, heavy planetary axles, four-wheel drive, articulated steering, and ergonomic controls. Their narrower, longer, and lower profile make them most suitable for underground applications where height and width are limited. As the length is not a limitation in a tunnel and decline, LHD loaders are designed with sufficient length. The length improves axial weight distribution and bucket capacity can be enhanced. The two-part construction with central articulation helps in tracking and maneuverability. In mining, there is a limitation for shifting heavy equipment, and sometimes, an LHD has to be shifted through a shaft while dismantled.

== Capacity ==
An LHD tramming capacity varies from 1 to 17-25 tonne. Their bucket size varies from 0.8 to 10 m^{3}. Bucket height ranges from 1.8 to 2.5 m.

== Drives ==
LHDs are available in both diesel and electric versions. The diesel version is easily transportable from one location to another and has diesel engines with a power drive of 75 to 150 HP or more. Engines are either water- or air-cooled.

LHD with electric motors as drives have a general capacity of 75 to 150 HP. These are operative at a medium voltage of 380 to 550 volts. Flexible trailing cables are provided with a reeling/unreeling facility to feed power.

These drives operate hydraulic pumps and hydraulic motors for further operation of the various movements of buckets and vehicle traction and steering. The speed of the vehicle is controlled mechanically. The transmission is controlled by a hydrostatic drive; in hydrostatic transmission, the motor drives a variable displacement pump hydraulically connected to a hydro-motor driving the axle via a gearbox. The speed is controlled by changing the displacement volume of the axial pump. The power train consists of a closed-loop hydraulic transmission, parking brakes, a two-stage gearbox, and drive lines.

== Safety provisions ==
Service, emergency, and parking brakes with fire-resistant hydraulic fluid are used. Headlights, audible warning signals, backup alarms, and portable fire extinguishers are provided. A special cabin is also provided for the safety of the operator. A safety device is provided to shut off the engine if exhaust gases exceed a temperature of 85 °C (or as per the set value).

For electric shock safety, these LHDs' power source (gate end box) is equipped with earth conductivity protection using pilot core in electric trailing cable, which isolates complete power when earth continuity is broken.

== Latest developments ==
Most LHDs come equipped with remote control capabilities, which are crucial for clearing materials in areas where the stope lacks top protection, preventing loose muck from falling off. Some LHD models offer remote tramming functionality, enabling them to handle a daily ore capacity of 8000 tons. Two LHD OEM's (Caterpillar and Sandvik) have developed commercial auto-tramming systems - called Minegem and Automine respectively.

== See also ==
- Adit
- Gold mining
- Mining
- Shaft Mining
- Mining Act of 1872
- Stoping
