= Coldvreath =

Hamlet in Cornwall, England

Coordinates: 50°23′34″N 4°49′58″W

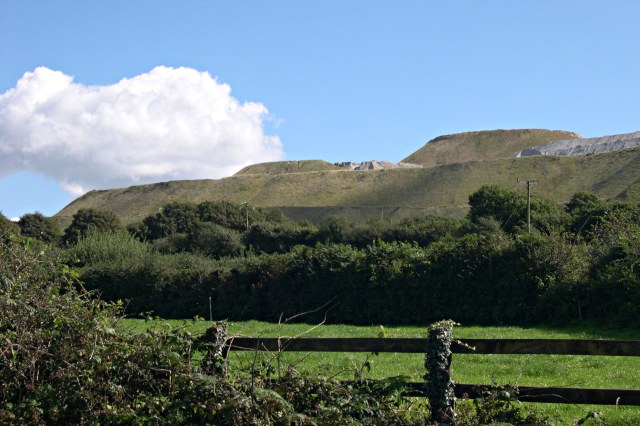
China clay waste tips over Higher Coldvreath

Coldvreath is a hamlet south-southwest of Roche in Cornwall, England. It is in the civil parish of Roche.
