= Carbis =

Hamlet in Cornwall, England

Coordinates: 50.401°N 4.817°W

Carbis: Cornish: Karrbons
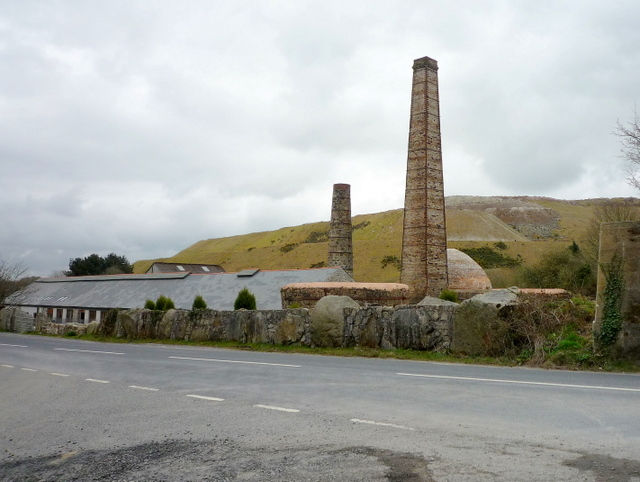
- Old china clay works at Carbis

- Location within Cornwall
- OS grid reference: SW999595
- Civil parish: Roche
- Unitary authority: Cornwall
- Ceremonial county: Cornwall
- Region: South West
- Country: England
- Sovereign state: United Kingdom
- Post town: ST. AUSTELL
- Postcode district: PL26
- Dialling code: 01726
- UK Parliament: St Austell and Newquay

Carbis (Cornish: Karrbons, meaning paved causeway) is a hamlet 0.9 miles (1.4 km) east of Roche in Cornwall, England. Carbis lies at about 495 feet (151 m) above sea level.

Rosemellyn China Clay works lies 0.4 miles (0.64 km) north-east of Carbis. In the 19th century the mining of china clay was an important industry around St Austell indeed the area has the nickname of the "china clay country". The Rosemellyn China Clay company went into liquidation in 1918. A short railway branch line (now dismantled) ran from Carbis Wharf to the sidings at nearby Bugle as part of the Cornwall Minerals Railway.
