= Tresayes Quarry =

Nature reserve in Cornwall, England

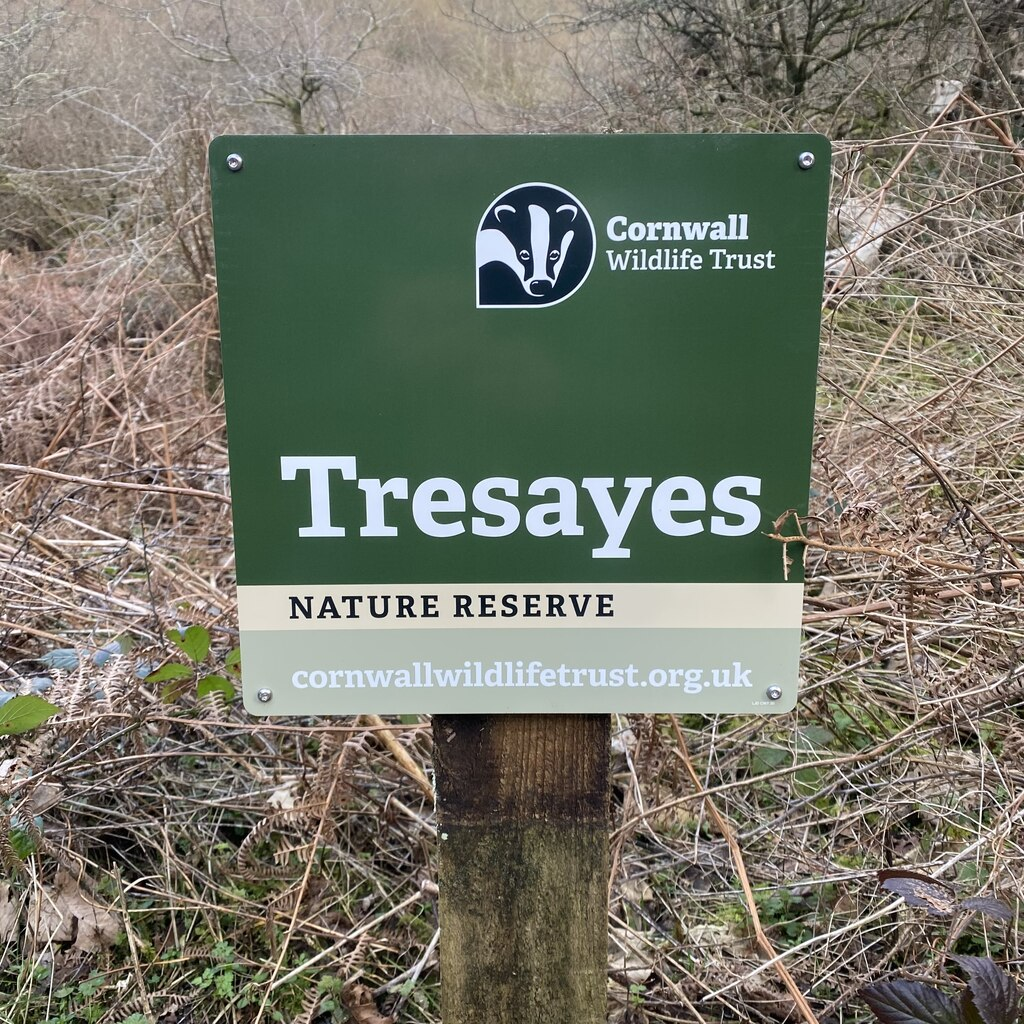

- Location within Cornwall
- Location: near Roche
- Nearest city: Truro
- OS grid: SW 995585
- Coordinates: 50.39211°N 4.82215°W
- Area: 1 hectare (2.5 acres)
- Owner: Imerys
- Website: www.cornwallwildlifetrust.org.uk/nature-reserves/Tresayes

Tresayes Quarry is designated as a (non-statutory) County Geology Site. The entrance to the reserve has a small car park with a gate at ///graver.brimmed.caveman There is a geology trail linking Roche Rock to Tresayes Quarry.

== Geology ==
The quarry is notable for a granitic pegmatite intruding hornfels, originally a sedimentary rock thermally metamorphosed by the St Austell granite intrusion. The pegmatite is composed of orthoclase feldspar, quartz, mica, and minor tourmaline and cordierite. Associated with the pegmatites, rare elements, such as niobium, cerium and beryllium also occur.

== History ==
When the quarry was first opened in the late 19th century, it was a source of pure feldspar, which was used in the glass making industry. The site was known locally as the Glass Mine or Polpuff. It closed for several years but reopened in 1917, during the First World War, to provide feldspar for electrical porcelain with at least 50 bal maidens separating the feldspar. The bal maidens were laid off in 1921 but some of the survivors were interviewed in 1980 by John Tonkin, who lived in Roche.

Since 2011 the quarry has been an EarthCache, visited by the geocaching community.
