= Gunnies =

Space left in a mine after the extraction of a vertical lode

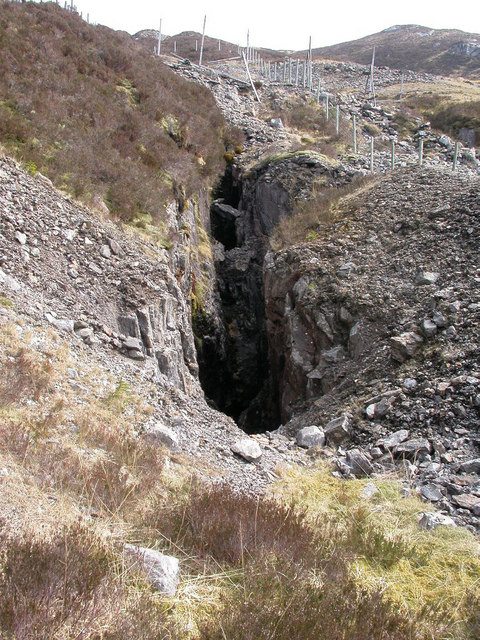
A gunnies that has breached the surface, becoming a coffin (in this case at a lead mine at Strontian in Scotland)

A gunnies, gunnis, or gunniss is the space left in a mine after the extraction by stoping of a vertical or near vertical ore-bearing lode. The term - originating from the Cornish language gonis meaning 'working' - is also used when this space breaks the surface of the ground, but it can then be known as a coffin or goffen. It can also be used to describe the deep trenches that were dug by early miners in following the ore-bearing lode downwards from the surface – in this case they are often called open-works; their existence can provide the earliest evidence of mining in an area. William Pryce, writing in 1778, also used the term as a measure of width, a single gunnies being equal to three feet.

== History ==
That the gunnis was an element of mining in ancient times has been shown by archaeological investigation, such as that performed in the 1990s at Bir Umm Fawakhir, an ancient gold mine in Egypt. The exploration revealed that some 20th-century drives had broken into ancient gunnises which were filled in by rocks that had fractured off the hanging wall, or fallen from above. It was discovered that a wall had been built around one of the gunnises in Roman or Byzantine times to stop material from falling in.

Some gunnies (Note: From the literature, the plural of gunnies appears also to be gunnies, so that is the spelling adopted here.) can be very large: in 1901 a warning was issued in The Cornishman about the "immense gunnies" in Dolcoath mine where there had been a big collapse in 1828 and "ominous slow movement" for the last 27 years; a 1934 article in The Western Morning News related a trip to the cliffs at St Agnes: where after entering a narrow hole, about 150 feet in there was a "huge excavation ... the top or 'back' [of which] could not be seen, and the depth must have been about 150 to 200 feet, as we could hear the sea roaring away down there [...] This huge "gunnies" could have contained a decent sized cathedral." The writer recommended that it be made accessible so that the public could admire "the works of the men [...] whose enterprise, energy, daring and skill are unsurpassed in the history of our country".

The name of the village of Gunnislake in east Cornwall, England, UK, is partly derived from the term: the first record of the name in 1485 is as Gonellake from a personal name "Gunna" and the local word "lake" for a stream, but by 1796 the name had changed to its present form as a result of the mining that took place in the area.

An 18th-century gunnis at Poldark Mine is mentioned as a notable feature in the successful Cornwall and West Devon Mining Landscape World Heritage Site nomination document of 2004.

== Problems and dangers ==
"And then I went on, bearing east so far as I recollect. There's a deep gunnies here..."
"That's so," said Ross.
"I climbed across'n – a plank, 'alf rotten..."

— Winston Graham, Warleggan.

The large extent and great depth of some gunnies often caused problems when they lay in the way of later mine development. For instance, Joseph Jennings, the former mine manager at East Pool mine wrote in 1916 that in 1908 he had had to bridge the "gunniss" of the Great Lode at the 160 fathom level, and that of the New North Lode at the 240 fathom level and install expensive timber stulls to enable the continued development of the mine. These large open underground spaces were the inevitable cause of accidents too: in 1836 a miner was killed at Dolcoath mine when he fell 13 fathoms (about 80 feet) from a "swing stage", a platform let down on ropes or chains into a gunnies that was too wide for any available timber to reach from side to side.

=== A house of water ===
Another problem caused to later mining was if a gunnies became flooded, when it would sometimes be called "a gunnies of water", but more often "a house of water". In his Mineralogia Cornubiensis of 1778, William Pryce talks of the care taken by miners when they thought they might be digging an adit towards a house of water: they ensured that they used an iron rod to bore a small hole several feet ahead of their main pickaxe excavation; by so doing they received advance warning of breaking into a huge volume of water. Despite this care, Pryce reported that the water pressure could quickly enlarge the small hole and uncontrollably flood the mine; he also stated that men were paid extra money for working in such dangerous areas and that he was aware of miners being killed when doing this.

The Victorian author R. M. Ballantyne's novel Deep Down; a Tale of the Cornish Mines includes a chapter entitled "Describes 'holing to a house of water' and its terrible consequences." In his later book of personal reminiscences entitled An Author's Adventures, Ballantyne states that his visits to the mines of the St Just area of Cornwall in 1868 were an inspiration for his novel. His reminiscences include a mine captain named Jan telling him about a house of water that was discovered in Botallack Mine and how it was cleared.

The greatest loss of life in Cornwall caused by "holing into a house of water" occurred at Wheal Owles in January 1893. Twenty miners were drowned when the flooded workings of the disused Wheal Drea were breached. This occurred because of former errors in "dialling" (the only means of underground surveying available at that time): according to the records, the level in which the breach occurred was being driven away from the old workings. The Wheal Owles mine was said to have filled from the 120-fathom sump to the 30-fathom sea level in only 20 minutes. (Note: A fathom is six feet, and depths are measured from "grass" or the ground level at the top of the mine shaft. So ground level at Wheal Owles was 180 feet (30 fathoms) above sea-level, at which depth there would have been a drainage adit, to keep the mine free of water to as great a depth as possible. A pumping engine was necessary to drain the workings that extended another 540 feet (90 fathoms) below sea-level to the sump, the deepest part of the mine. The breach occurred at the 65-fathom level (390 feet below the surface).) After the accident, the only pumping engine on the site was not powerful enough to drain the mine and attempts at fund-raising to install a better one were unsuccessful, so the bodies of those who drowned were never recovered.

=== Disposal of waste ===
Rather than being kept open, disused gunnies were often used as a convenient site for the disposal of waste rock (known as "deads" or "attle"). This had the useful side-effect of avoiding the need to support the sides of the gunnies with stulls, especially if the gunnies diverged significantly from the vertical, to avoid the likely collapse of the hanging wall. This was still not an ideal solution, however, because if it became necessary to pass through the filled gunnies in later development of the mine, the problem became one of digging through and supporting tons of loose rock. The 1893 mining accident at Dolcoath in which seven men were killed was caused by failure of the stull holding up a huge quantity of deads in a gunnies.

== Sources ==
- Pryce, William (1778). Mineralogia Cornubiensis: A Treatise on Minerals, Mines and Mining.
