= Charles Knight (civil servant) =

British civil servant

Charles Knight CB (1863–25 March 1941) was a British civil servant.

Born in Roche, Cornwall, Knight served as Assistant Secretary of the Local Government Board from 1918 to 1919 and then its successor, the Ministry of Health, from 1919 to 1922. He was appointed Companion of the Order of the Bath (CB) in the 1920 New Year War Honours.
