= Charles Thomas (mine agent) =

British mine agent

Charles Thomas (1794-1868) was a mining agent and share dealer in Camborne, Cornwall, in the United Kingdom. He was an advocate of deep mining.

Charles Thomas was employed at Dolcoath Mine in Camborne from the age of 12 and nine years later was made an underground agent. By 1832 the mine's previously rich deposits of copper ore were substantially worked-out and the mine was in danger of closing. Thomas believed that rich deposits of tin ore would be found below the lowest levels of the mine, and tried to persuade the shareholders of this without success.

However, in 1844, on the death of the manager, William Petherick, Thomas was appointed manager or "Captain" of the mine. Despite continued opposition from the shareholders, he persuaded a group of miners to work the lowest levels of the mine. These miners, known as "tributers", were paid solely on the basis of the ore they recovered, so the activity was undertaken at no threat to the shareholders. Good deposits of ore were quickly discovered and this helped Thomas raise the capital needed to deepen the mine further. In 1853 the first dividend was paid to the shareholders and Dolcoath went on to become the most productive tin mine in Cornwall.

== Publications ==
- Remarks on the geology of Cornwall and Devon: In connexion with the deposits of metallic ores, and on the bearings of the productive lodes, given in two lectures with Lithographic Illustration Together with Additional Remarks on the Same Subject ; Redruth, James Tregaskis (1859)
- Mining fields of the West: being a practical exposition of the principal mines and mining districts in Cornwall and Devon; Truro, D. Bradford Barton, 1967. ISBN 978-0-85153-073-4 (first published 1867)
- Investors' handbook : containing full and reliable information with regard to every description of investment; London : Charles Thomas, 1877
- Tables Suited to a New Method of Ascertaining the Value of Tin Stuff ; Marazion : S.Bennett, 1836
- Tables For Ascertaining the Value of Tin Stuff ; Redruth : James Tregaskis, 1859
