= Victoria, Cornwall =

Hamlet in England

Coordinates: 50.4207°N 4.8316°W

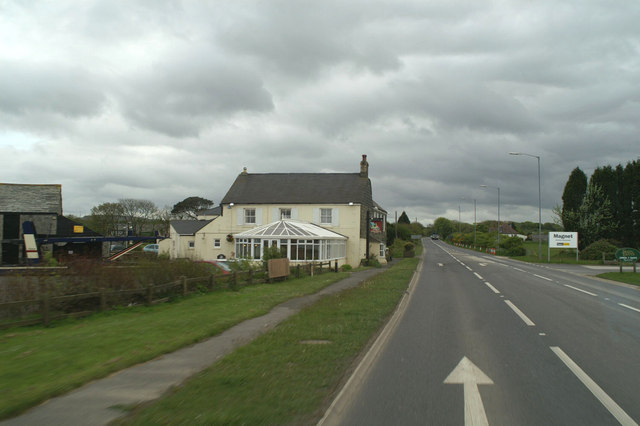
The Victoria public house

Victoria is a hamlet in Cornwall, England, UK. It is located in the civil parish of Roche, 1 mile (1.6 km) north of Roche village and 6 miles (9.7 km) north of the town of St Austell.

The hamlet contains a pub, petrol station, a business park and Roche railway station.

== Sport ==
=== Cornish wrestling ===
Cornish wrestling tournaments were held in field by Victoria Inn in the 1900s.

=== Horse Racing ===
Horse racing was held in the 19th-century. Races included the St Columb Stakes, the West Cornwall Hunt Cup, Tregothnan Cup and the Bodmin and Wadebridge Stakes.
