= Roche, Cornwall =

Village in Cornwall, England

Coordinates: 50°24′N 4°50′W

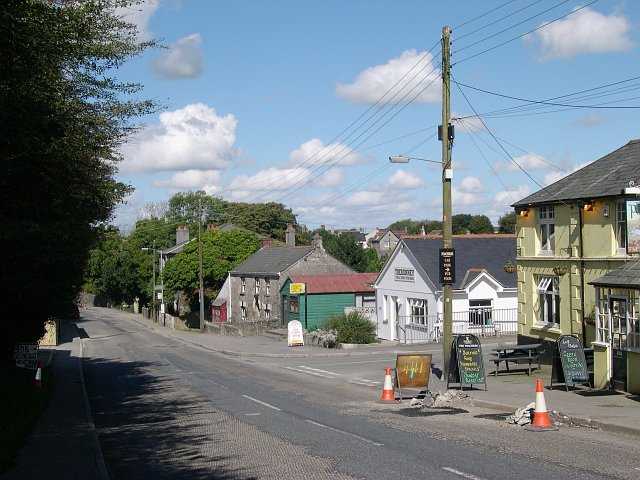
Roche in 2005

Roche (/roʊtʃ/; Cornish: Tregarrek, meaning homestead of the rock) is a civil parish and village in mid-Cornwall, England, United Kingdom. The village gets its name from the 20-metre (66-foot) high Roche Rock, a quartz-schorl outcrop east of the village. Roche is the Norman-French word for Rock. The parish population at the 2011 census including Belowda, Bilberry, Carbis, Coldvreath and Criggan is 3,381, and the ward population at the same census was 3,867.

Nearby are the towns of Bodmin and St Austell, as well as the Eden Project. The civil servant Charles Knight was born in Roche and Liberal Democrat Member of Parliament Matthew Taylor retired there.

== Roche Rock ==
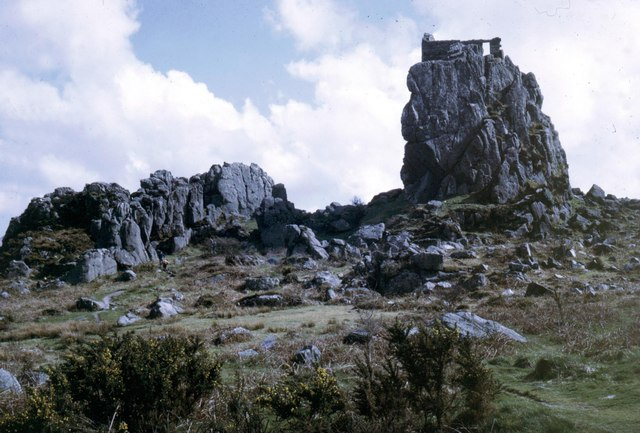
Roche Rock

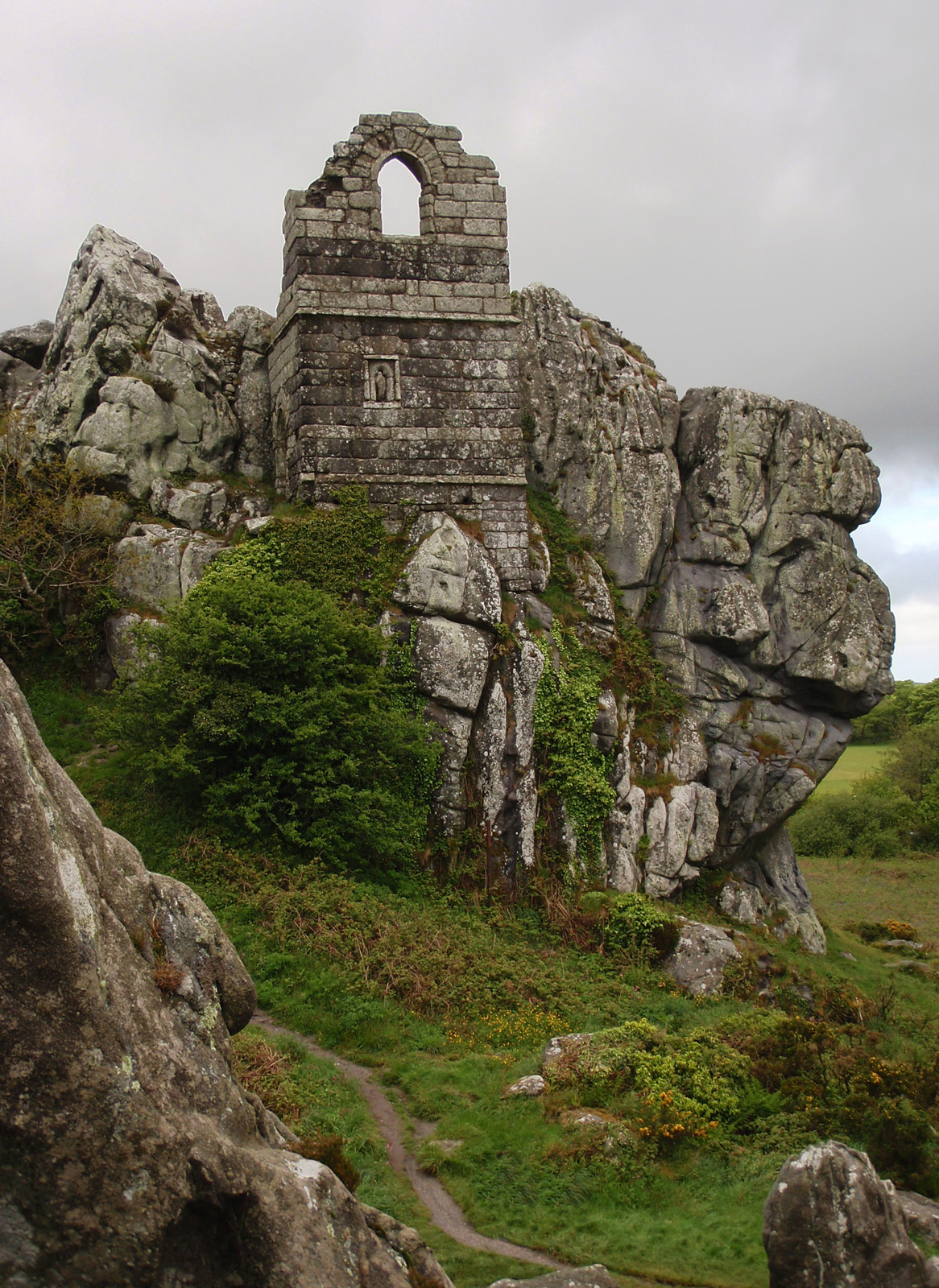
Roche Chapel

Roche Rock (Cornish: An Garrek) stands out as a rocky outcrop some 20 metres (66 ft) high on the northern flank of the St Austell granite with an approximate area of 600 metres (2,000 ft) x 300 metres (980 ft).) The rock is of interest to geologists as it is a fine example of quartz schorl; a fully tourmalinised granite, with black tourmaline crystals. The Rock itself lies approximately 500 metres (1,600 ft) north of the northern margin of the St Austell granite, which is the smallest of the five main apophyses of the Hercynian batholith of Southwest England. The presence of numerous pegmatites occurring as sheets and containing abundant miarolitic cavities carrying quartz, tourmaline, zinnwaldite, topaz, and a wide range of other phases, is why the present outcrop of the St Austell granite is considered to have been close to the roof of the intrusion. One such pegmatite was formerly exploited for orthoclase feldspar at Tresayes Quarry, on the southern edge of the village and now a geological nature reserve of Cornwall Wildlife Trust. Part of this quarry also exploited quartz-tourmaline rock for aggregate. There is a downloadable geology trail linking Roche Rock to Tresayes Quarry along public rights-of-way. Roche Rock is considered to be of prime importance for future research, and notification by Natural England as a geological SSSI occurred in 1991.

On top of Roche Rock is a ruined chapel (dedicated to St Michael) which is said to have been the abode of a leper or a monk. An 1881 description of the chapel, still had a considerable portion of the masonry standing and one or two windows were fairly perfect, although the steps up to the chapel are roughly cut. Roche Rock has many folk-lore tales associated with it, the two most famous being the legend of Jan Tregeagle, a 17th-century magistrate, who after death found refuge in the chapel and the other being part of the Tristan and Iseult tale.

Roche Rock was used as a location in the film Omen III.

== Parish church ==
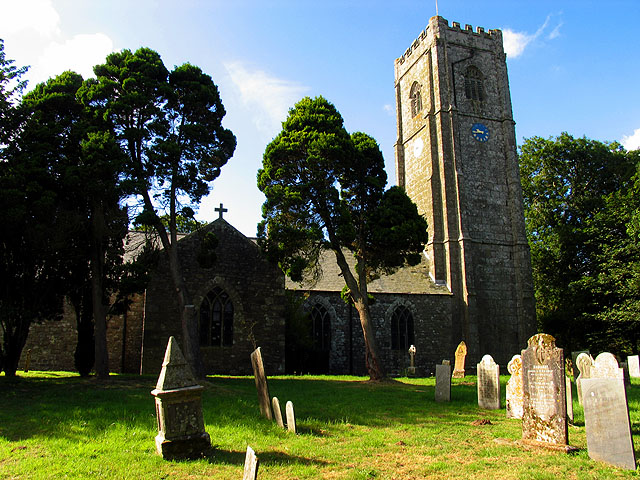
Roche Parish Church

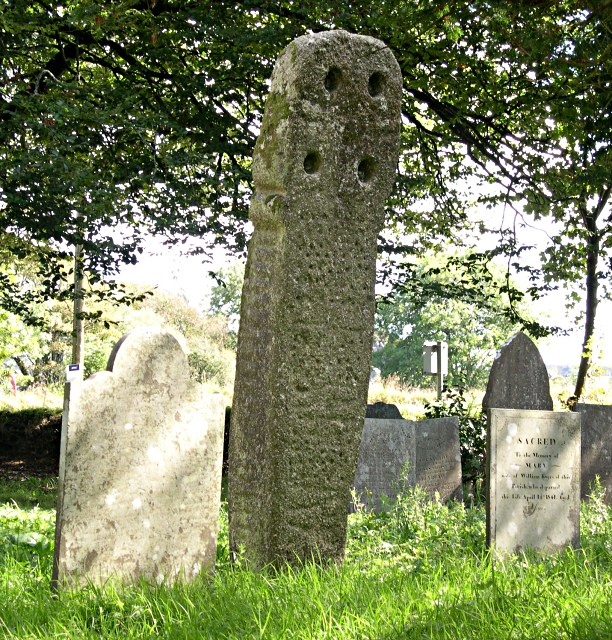
The churchyard cross

The church is dedicated to St Gomondas / Gonandus (Gonand or Goenandus): the tower is medieval but the rest of the church was rebuilt in 1822. There is a fine Norman font and a good churchyard cross. Gonandus may perhaps be identified with the Breton saint Conan, connected to three places in the diocese of Vannes.

There are two Cornish crosses in the parish: one in a meadow near the rectory garden is thought to be in situ; the other in the churchyard has ornament on the four sides of the shaft. The churchyard cross is made of a massive piece of moorland granite; it has similarities to the cross in the graveyard at Merther Uny. Glebe Cross has crosses in relief on either face of the cross head.

== Railway ==
Roche railway station is located approximately 1 mile north of Roche, at Victoria on the Atlantic Coast Line. Trains are operated by Great Western Railway. The station has a single track, with a marker board showing direction of travel either to Newquay or Par.

== Business ==
The Victoria Business Park on the outskirts of Roche is an attractively landscaped estate consisting of 28 modern units. The units are designed for light industrial, warehouse and trade uses. Most of the units have a secure gated yard.

== Cornish wrestling ==
Cornish wrestling tournaments were held in Roche in the 1800s and 1900s in following places:

- Roche church - traditionally, in the meadow behind Roche parish church, Cornish wrestling tournaments were held. In the late 1920s this was changed to the Rectory field.
- In a field near Roche Rock.

Some famous Cornish wrestlers came from Roche. This includes:

- John Truscott (1766–1848) who was a champion Cornish wrestler, competing with an 'East Cornwall' style. He won a famous match with the Giant Jordan in 1813. His grave is immediately to the left of the porch of Roche church.
- Harry Gregory was middleweight champion in 1928, 1929, 1930, 1934, 1935 and 1936.
- Francis Gregory (1904-?) was a champion Cornish wrestler in the 1920s and 1930s who won the heavyweight title 9 times in a row from 1928 and the interceltic title 7 times in a row. He was champion of Britain in 1934. He was a famous sportsman, being a professional wrestler and boxer, who played league and union rugby (including for England). He participated in the first televised wrestling match and wrestled Billy Holland in a scene for the film Breakers Ahead.

See also Cornish wrestling in Victoria, Cornwall.

== Bibliography ==
- Payne, H. M. Creswell (1948) Story of the Parish of Roche, ASIN: B004ITZBWG
