= Stoping =

Process of extracting mineral from an underground mine

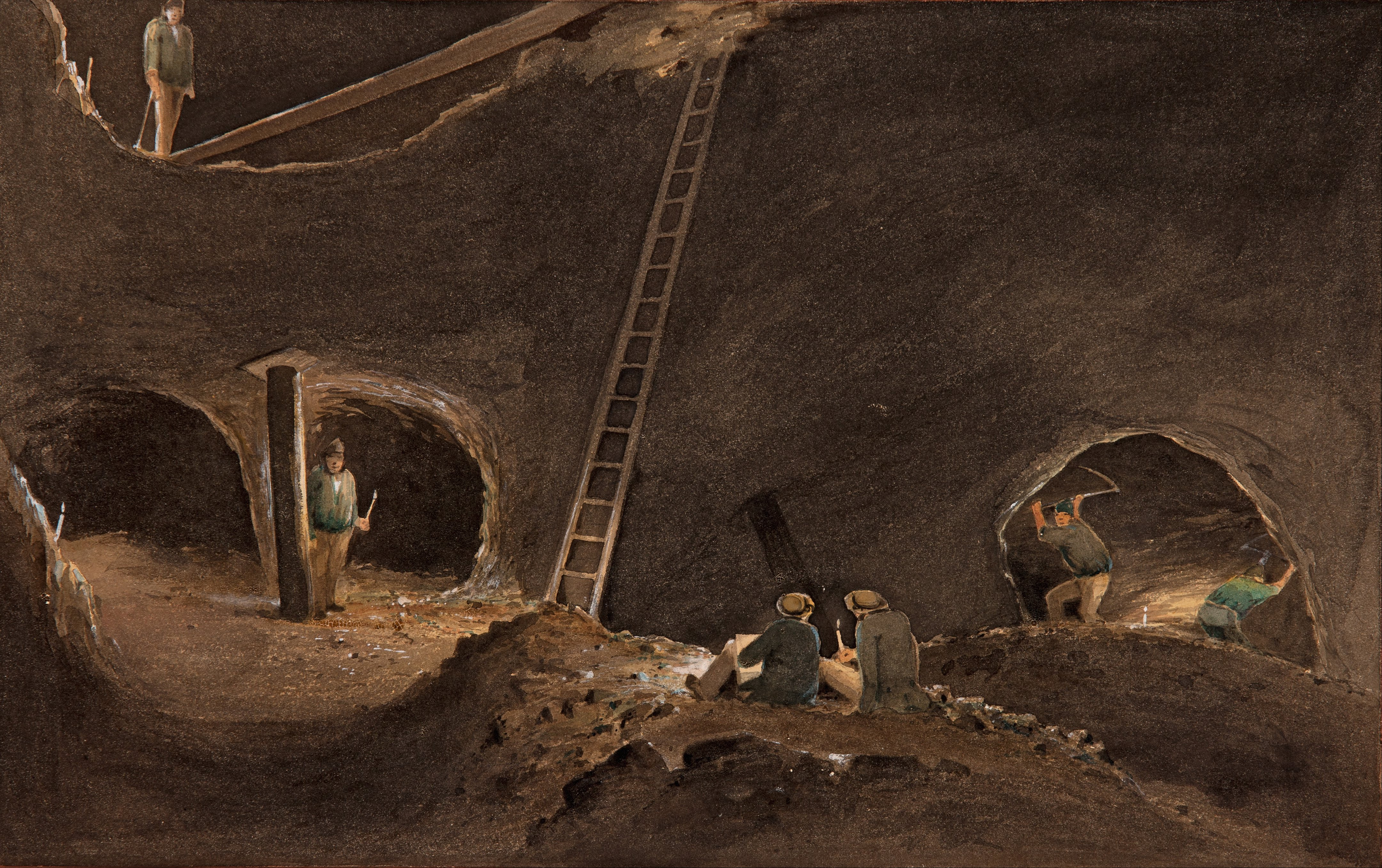
Sketch painting of miners stoping at the Burra Burra Mine, Burra, Australia, 1847.

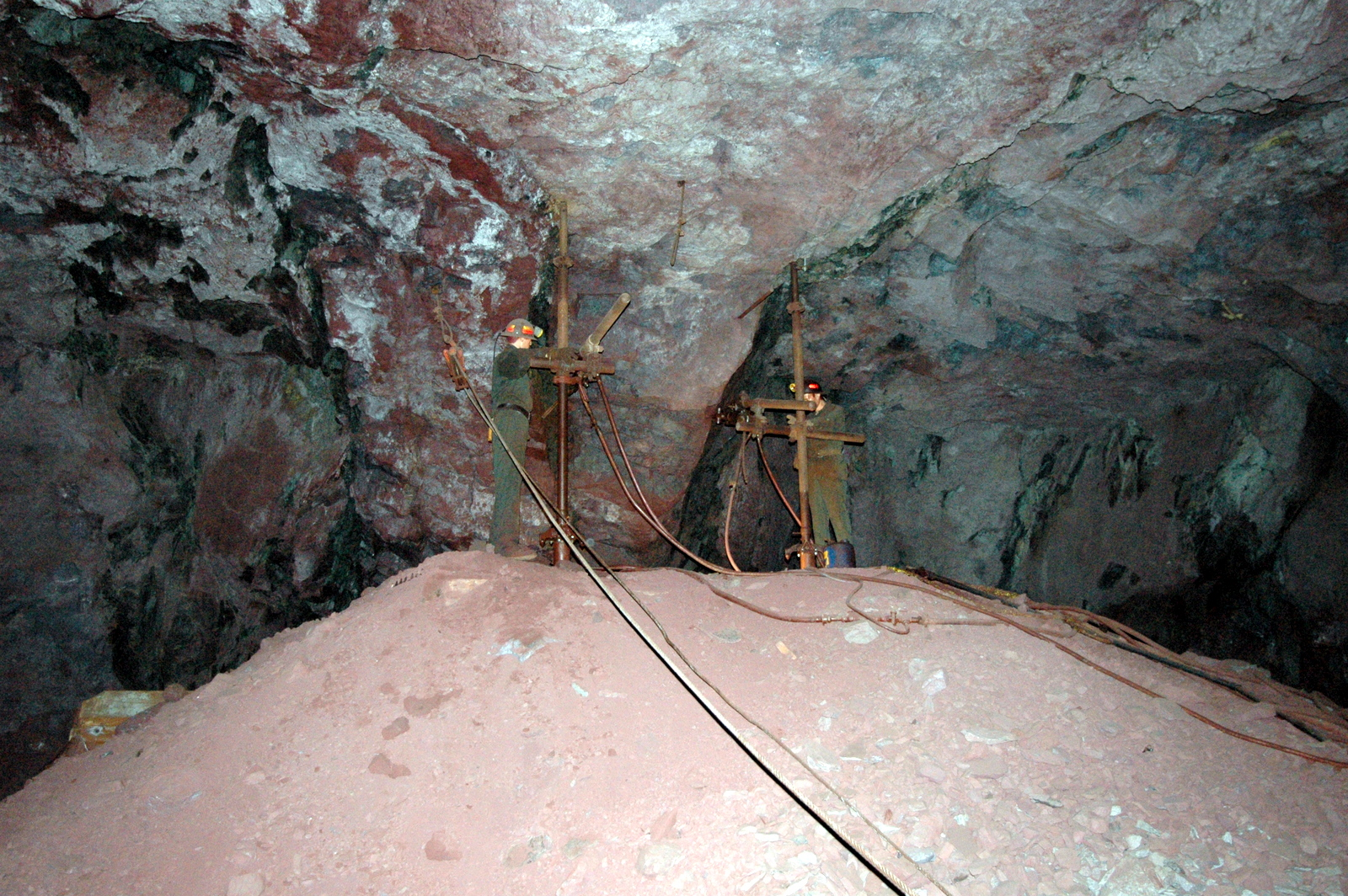
Stoping with an air drill in an American iron mine in the 20th century (museum exhibit)

Stoping is the process of extracting the desired ore or other mineral from an underground mine, leaving behind an open space known as a stope. Stoping is used when the country rock is sufficiently strong not to collapse into the stope, although in most cases artificial support is also provided.

The earliest forms of stoping were conducted with hand tools or by fire-setting; later gunpowder was introduced. From the 19th century onward, various other explosives, power-tools, and machines came into use. As mining progresses the stope is often backfilled with tailings, or when needed for strength, a mixture of tailings and cement. In old mines, stopes frequently collapse at a later time, leaving craters or flashes at the surface. They are an unexpected danger when records of underground mining have been lost with the passage of time.

Stoping is considered "productive work", and is contrasted with "deadwork", the work required merely to access the mineral deposit, such as sinking shafts and winzes, carving adits, tunnels, and levels, and establishing ventilation and transportation.

== Overview ==
A stope can be created in a variety of ways. The specific method of stoping depends on a number of considerations, both technical and economical, based largely on the geology of the ore body being mined. These include the incline of the deposit (whether it is flat, tilted or vertical), the width of the deposit, the grade of the ore, the hardness and strength of the surrounding rock, and the cost of materials for supports.

It is common to dig shafts vertically downwards to reach the ore body and then drive horizontal levels through it. Stoping then takes place from these levels.

When the ore body is more or less horizontal, various forms of room and pillar stoping, cut and fill, or longwall mining can take place. In steeply-dipping ore bodies, such as lodes of tin, the stopes become long narrow near-vertical spaces, which, if one reaches the surface is known as a gunnis or goffen. A common method of mining such vertical ore bodies is stull stoping, see below.

== Open-stope systems ==
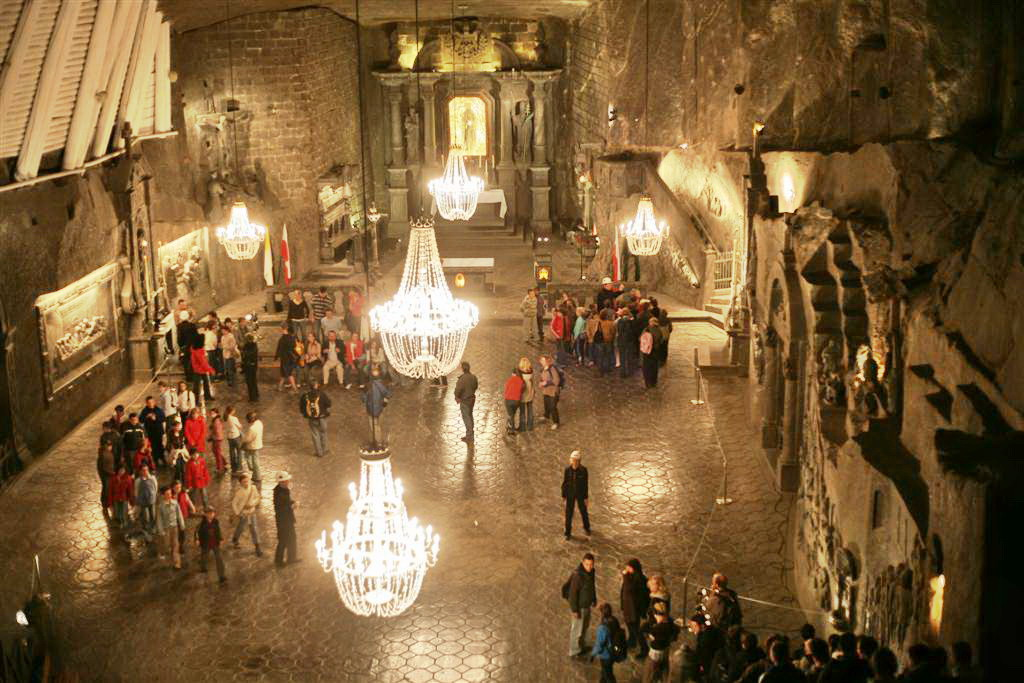
A large stope converted into a chapel in a salt mine in Poland – now open to tourists

Open stoping is generally divided into two basic forms based on direction: overhand and underhand stoping, which refer to the removal of ore from above or below the level, respectively. It is also possible to combine the two in a single operation.

=== Underhand stoping ===
Underhand stoping, also known as horizontal-cut underhand or underbreaking stoping, is the working of an ore deposit from the top downwards. Like shrinkage stoping, underhand stoping is most suitable for steeply dipping ore bodies. Because of the mechanical advantage it offers hand tools being struck downward (rather than upward, against gravity), this method was dominant prior to the invention of rock blasting and powered tools.

=== Overhand stoping ===
In overhand stoping, the deposit is worked from the bottom upward, the reverse of underhand stoping. With the advent of rock blasting and power drills, it became the predominant direction of stoping.

=== Combined stoping ===
In combined stoping, the deposit is simultaneously worked from the bottom upward and the top downward, combining the techniques of overhand and underhand stoping into a single approach.

=== Breast stoping ===
Breast stoping is a method used in horizontal or near-horizontal ore bodies, where gravity is not usable to move the ore around. Breast stoping lacks the characteristic "steps" of either underhand or overhand stoping, being mined in a singular cut. Room and pillar is a type of breast stoping.

== Timbered-stope systems ==
=== Stull stoping ===
Stull stoping is a form of stoping used in hardrock mining that uses systematic or random timbering ("stulls") placed between the foot and hanging wall of the vein. The method requires that the hanging wall and often the footwall be of competent rock as the stulls provide the only artificial support. This type of stope has been used up to a depth of 3,500 feet (1,077 m) and at intervals up to 12 feet (3.7 m) wide. The 1893 mining disaster at Dolcoath mine in Cornwall was caused by failure of the stulls holding up a huge weight of waste rock.

=== Square-set stoping ===
Square-set timbering was invented in the Comstock Lode, Virginia City, Nevada in the 1860s.

Square-set stoping is a historical method of stoping which relies on interlocking timbers set into place forming a grid, wedged tightly against the rock. As the mining progresses, generally upwards, new timber sets are added to fill the void. Ore is dropped through the sets freely or fed into chutes and either loaded into ore cars or mucked out from there.

Depending on rock conditions and other technical considerations, once the stope has reached its engineered height, it may be left open or backfilled for support. A common historical method of hydraulic fill involved dumping waste rock into a completed stope, then slurrying in a mixture of mill sand and water. The water drains away leaving the sand to lock the fill in place. Other methods of hydraulic fill using cement and mill sand, such as paste fill, are more contemporary methods of stoping and unlikely used in conjunction with the antiquated method of squareset timbering.

== Shrinkage stoping ==
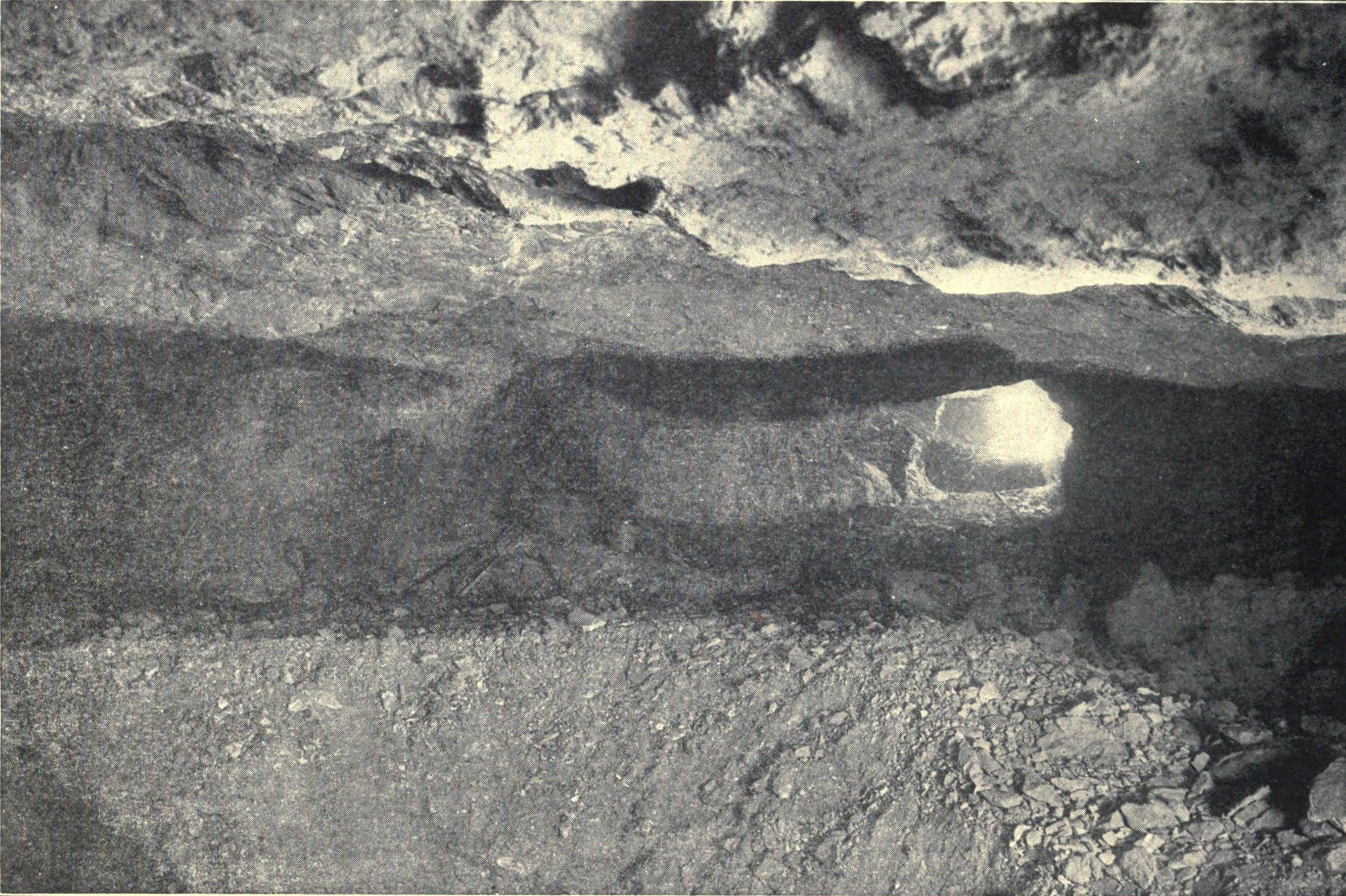
A large stope in the Treadwell gold mine, Alaska 1908; an example of shrinkage stoping

Shrinkage stoping is most suitable for steeply dipping ore bodies (70°—90°). In shrinkage stoping, mining proceeds from the bottom upwards, in horizontal slices (similar to cut and fill mining), with the broken ore being left in place for miners to work from. Because blasted rock takes up a greater volume than in situ rock (due to swell factor), some of the blasted ore (approximately 40%) must be removed to provide working space for the next ore slice. Once the top of the stope is reached all the ore is removed from the stope. The stope may be backfilled or left empty, depending on the rock conditions.

== Long hole stoping ==
Long hole stoping as the name suggests uses holes drilled by a production drill to a predetermined pattern as designed by a mining engineer. Long hole stoping is a highly selective and productive method of mining and can cater for varying ore thicknesses and dips (0 – 90 degree). It differs from manual methods such as timbered and shrinkage as once the stope has begun blasting phase it cannot be accessed by personnel. For this reason the blasted rock is designed to fall into a supported drawpoint or removed with remote control LHD (load, haul, dump machine).

The biggest limitation with this method is the length of holes that can be accurately drilled by the production drill, larger diameter holes using in the hole hammer drills can be accurate to over 100 m in length while floating boom top hammer rigs are limited to ~30 m.

=== Slot – initial void ===
Holes drilled underground are generally drilled perpendicular, in a radial pattern around the drive. For the blastholes to successfully extract the ore material they must be able to fire into a void in front. A slot is required in every stope to provide the initial void. The slot is often the most difficult, costly and highest risk component of mining a stope. Depending on the shape, height and other factors, different methods to create a slot can be used such as:

- Raise bore, a circular shaft mined bottom up using mechanical rollers to achieve shaft profile. This method works well in larger stopes however requires both access to top and bottom of stoping block. Raise bores work most effectively between 45 and 90 deg.
- Longhole raise, a pattern of tightly spaced blastholes and reamers (empty holes with no charge), similar to a burn cut in a development round. Can be done as downhole and fired in multiple lifts (15m rise in 3 lifts of 5 m to minimise chance of blast failing) or as uphole in one single firing. This method works well for shorter raises between 45 and 90 deg, however it is prone to freezing and may require remedial drilling to extract slot to full height.
- Airleg raise, using an airleg (jackleg) machine to develop a sub vertical raise into the stoping block. This method has the advantage of giving geological and geotechnical teams further analysis of the stoping block prior to mining.
- Boxhole boring, similar to raise boring but less productive as broken material is extracted from the same location as the drill, is used to bore vertically with no top level access required. (Hamza, 2016)
