= Great Rock Mine =

Disused mine in Devon, England

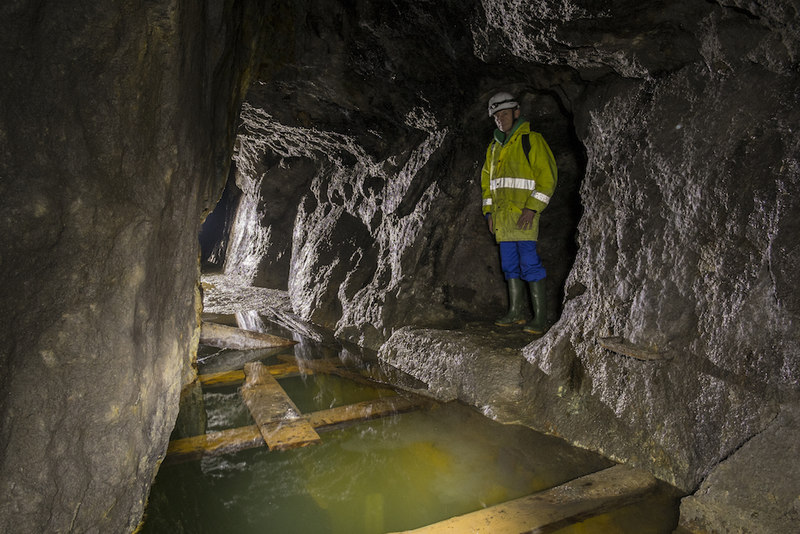
- Great Rock Mine

- Location in Devon
- Location: Bovey Tracey in Devon, England; 50°37′23″N 3°39′44″W
- Products: Micaceous haematite

Great Rock Mine is a disused micaceous haematite mine about 3 km north of the town of Bovey Tracey in Devon, England. It was worked from the nineteenth century until 1969, and was the last active mine in the Dartmoor National Park area.

At its most active during the 1940s, the mine produced 2,500 tons of micaceous haematite per year. The mineral was an important ingredient in the rust-resistant paint used on Royal Navy ships and on bridges, including the Royal Albert Bridge and the Sydney Harbour Bridge.
