= Gunnis Creek =

Stream in Reynolds County, Missouri, U.S.

Coordinates: 37.5303251°N 91.0029031°W

Gunnis Creek is a stream in Reynolds County in the U.S. state of Missouri. It is a tributary of Brushy Creek.

A variant name was "Gunnets Creek". The stream has the name of the local Gunnet family, original owners of the site.
