= Dolcoath mine =

Former copper and tin mine in Cornwall, UK

Coordinates: 50.2172°N 5.2804°W

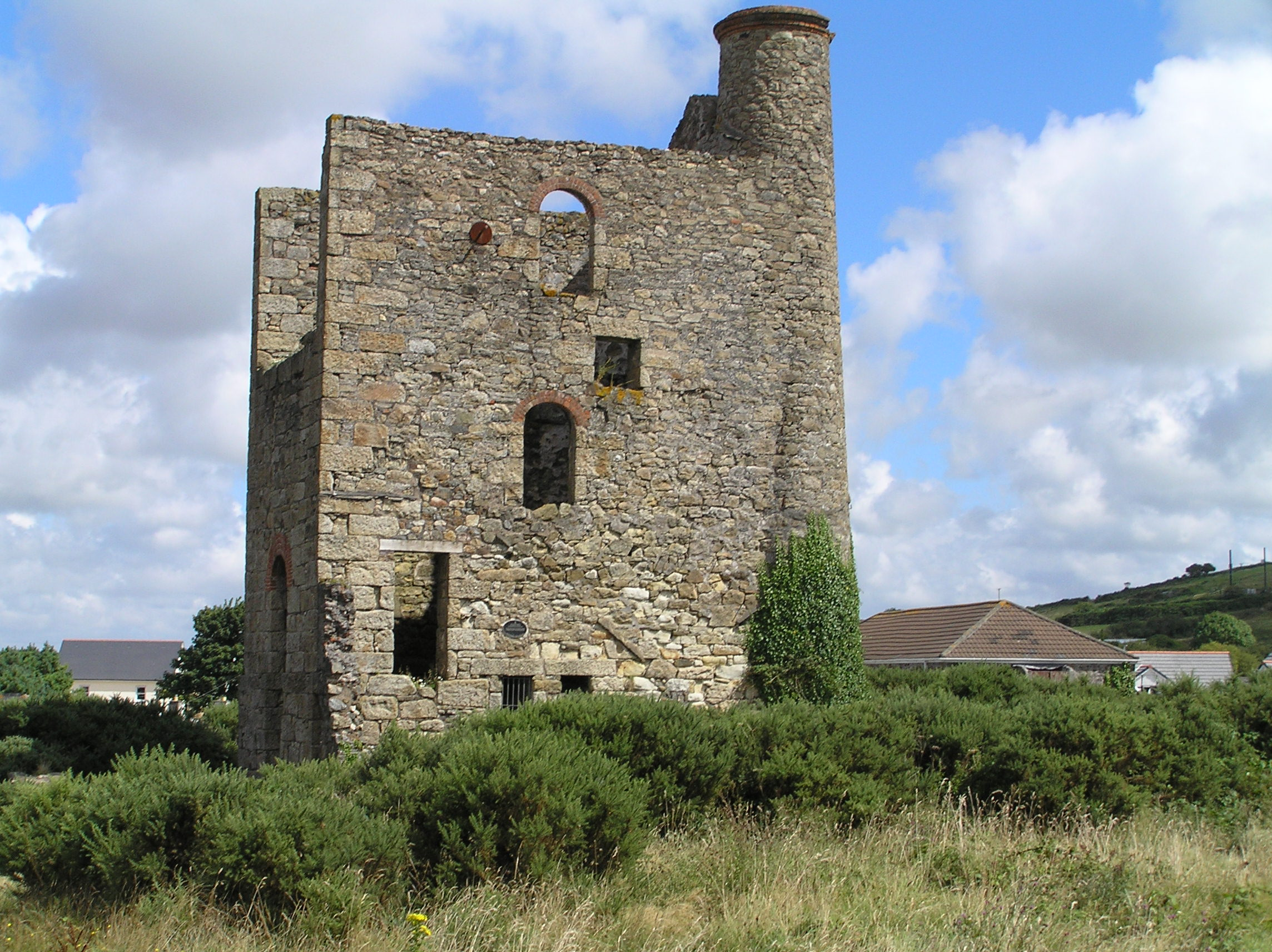
Harriets Pumping Engine house, part of Dolcoath Mine, built in 1860

Dolcoath mine (Cornish: Bal Dorkoth) was a copper and tin mine in Camborne, Cornwall, United Kingdom. Its name derives from the Cornish for 'Old Ground', and it was also affectionately known as The Queen of Cornish Mines. The site is north-west of Carn Brea. Dolcoath Road runs between the A3047 road and Chapel Hill. The site is south of this road.

== History ==
The mineral rights were owned by the Basset family of Tehidy who are recorded on a deed in 1588 as leasing the ground to a family called Crane. By 1720 the mine was being worked for copper, and it was almost 300 feet (91 m) deep in 1746, when William Borlase called it a "very considerable mine". In 1778 it was nearly 600 feet (180 m) deep, according to William Price. The mine closed in 1787 because the large amount of copper ore that was being cheaply mined from Parys Mountain on Anglesey had depressed the price. However the price of copper slowly recovered and the mine reopened in 1799.

Of around 470 copper-producing mines in Cornwall and Devon, Dolcoath became the fifth largest. But as depth increased the copper died out, and by 1832 the mine was in danger of closing. However the mine captain, Charles Thomas, was convinced that tin ore would be found deeper down and after disagreements with the shareholders his faith was repaid and the first tin dividend was paid in 1853.

By 1882 the mine had reached a depth of 2,160 feet (660 m) and had 12 miles (19 km) of tunnels passable by men and a further 40 miles (64 km) of old workings which had become unused and impassable. In 1893 there was a major accident at the 412-fathom level (see below). In 1895 it took men employed in the lower levels between 2 and 3 hours to go down and return to the surface, so they could not work more than 4–5 hours a day.

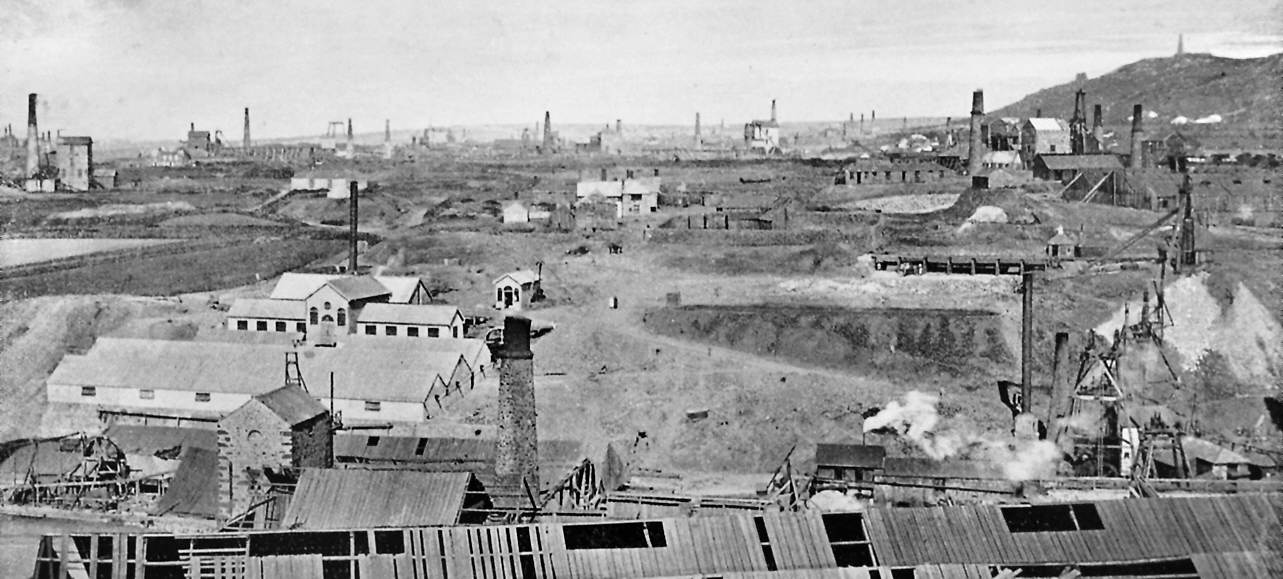
View east from Dolcoath Mine, 1893

Dolcoath became the largest and deepest mine in Cornwall, with its principal shaft, known as New Sump Shaft, eventually reaching a depth of 3,300 feet (1,000 m) below the surface. The pumping engine that worked this shaft dated from 1815; a piece of the cast iron bob from this engine is preserved in the collection of the Trevithick Society. This engine originally had a 76-inch-diameter (1,900 mm) cylinder, but this had to be replaced with an 85-inch (2,200 mm) cylinder when it was not powerful enough to cope with the deepening shaft. The rebuilt engine was so large that there was not enough room in the engine house for the stairs, so a unique wooden extension was built on the back to house them.

In 1895 it was decided to reconstruct the company as a limited company, replacing the old cost book system under which most Cornish mines had traditionally been run. A new shaft, named the Williams Shaft after the first chairman of the new company, was started in October 1895, intended to be the first 3,000-foot (910 m) vertical shaft in Cornwall. It was completed in 1910 and came into use the next year.

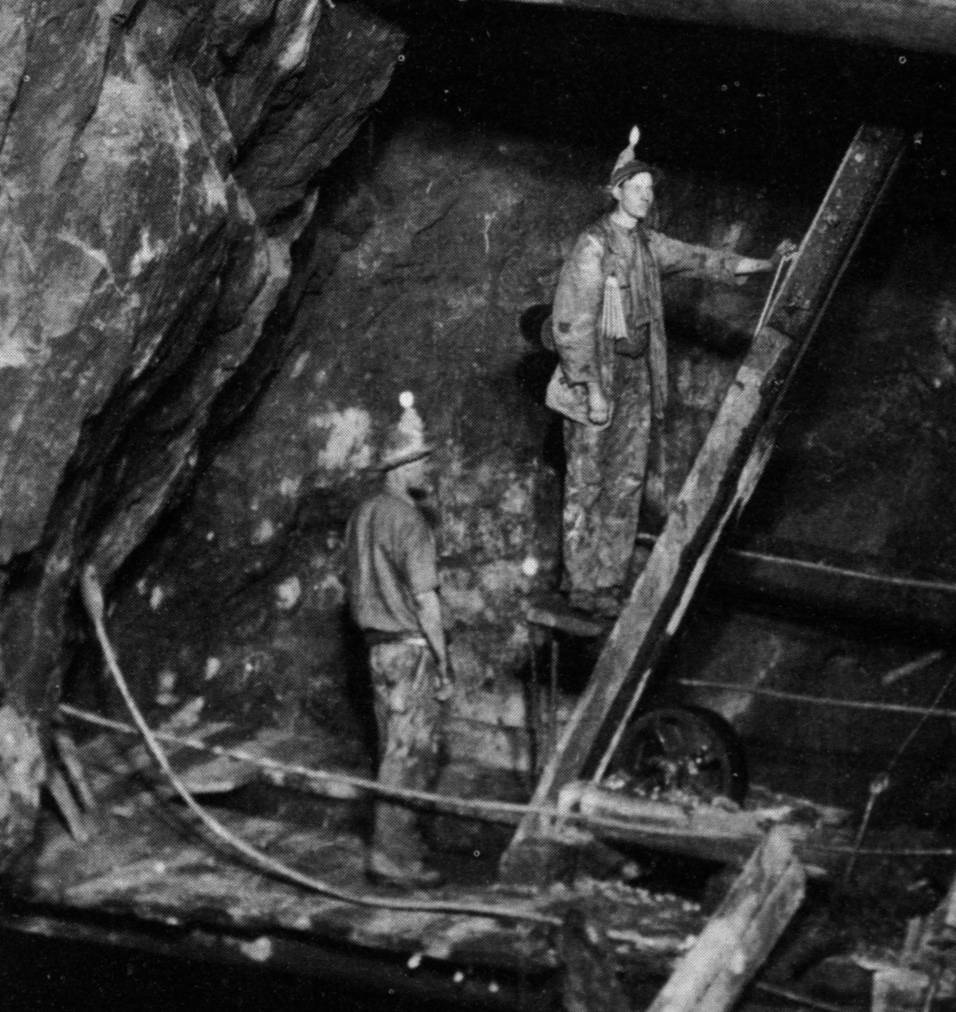
The man engine of Dolcoath mine

In 1920 when the mine had become virtually worked out and following the tin price collapse (new deposits were also being found elsewhere in the world) Dolcoath finally closed. The company was reconstructed in 1923 when fresh capital was raised and a new 2,000-foot (610 m) circular shaft was sited north of the old mine at Roskear. The New Dolcoath Mine was actually an amalgamation of several smaller mines including Stray Park and Roskear. In 1936 Dolcoath's sett was purchased by South Crofty.

== Major accident ==
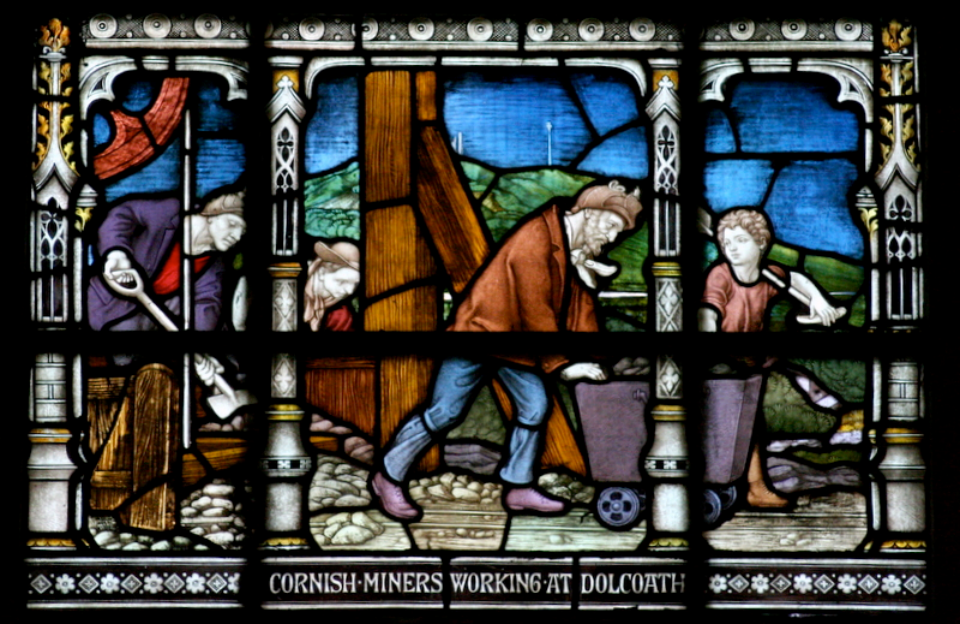
Miners at Dolcoath as depicted in an 1890s stained glass window. The window was finished shortly after the accident.

On 20 September 1893 a party of miners was strengthening a large stull at the 412 level (nearly half a mile underground). The stull consisted of about 22 pieces of 18-inch-square (460 mm) by 33-foot-long (10 m) timbers of pitch pine set about 2 ft (0.6 m) apart. It was holding up some 600 feet (180 m) in height of waste rock. The day before, the mine captain, Josiah Thomas, and Captain James Johns, the chief underground agent, had visited the level and expressed concern at the safety of the stull because one of the pieces was bending. Men were immediately instructed to strengthen it. Repair work proceeded through the morning until at 1 pm after a small fall of rock, the whole stull suddenly gave way, killing seven of the men working underneath. One man, Richard Davies, was rescued unhurt after 37 hours. In around 1898 the then mine captain, Arthur Thomas, reported that Davies went to America some time after, and then worked in South Africa.

At the subsequent inquest, Captain Josiah Thomas said that the working party must have removed some of the old props before putting in the new ones, but this was contradicted by one of the survivors who reported that the men were doing nothing at the time to cause the fall.

== Output ==
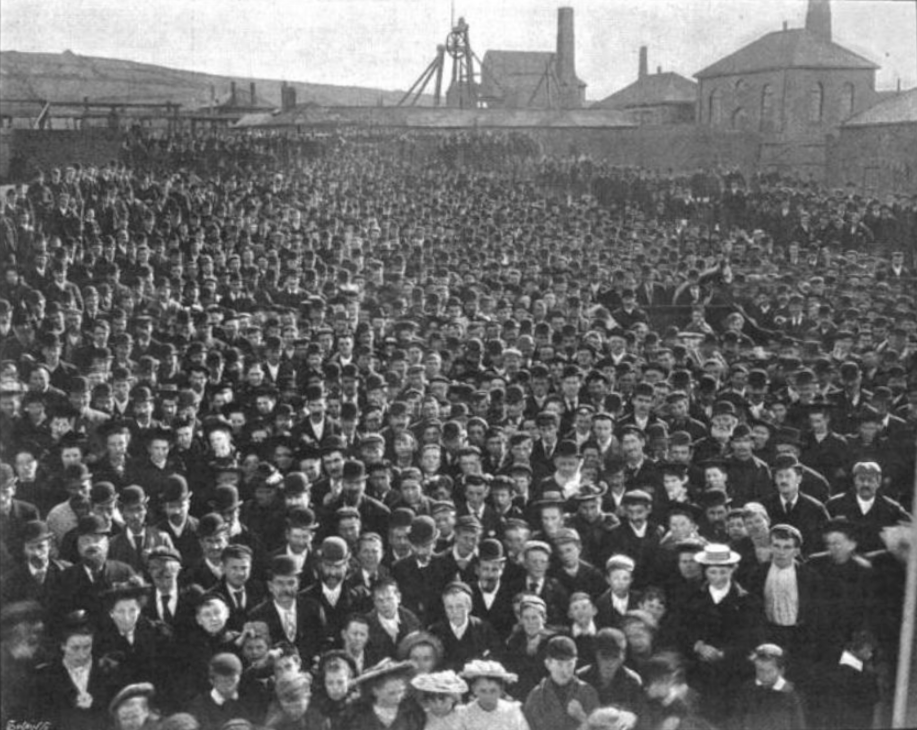
Mine employees in 1895

Before its first closure in 1788, Dolcoath was estimated to have produced tin and copper valued at least £1,250,000. Of this, £450,000 was due to copper production between 1740 and 1777. From 1799 to its final closure in 1920 its total production of minerals was valued at over £9 million - this included arsenic, silver and other minerals.

From 1853, when the first dividend on tin was paid, the mine produced over 100,000 tons of black tin. This was far in excess of the production of any other mine in Cornwall. In 1896 the mine was yielding 80 pounds of black tin per ton of rock lifted, but this gradually declined to 30 pounds by 1915 which level was maintained until the mine closed.

Because of its success, the mine paid frequent dividends to its shareholders, and its shares, which were nicknamed "Dollies", were among the most sought-after of the industry.

== Health ==
Workers suffered "Dolcoath" or "miner's anemia". Boycott and Haldane established in 1903 that this was not due to poor ventilation or bad air, but that the mine provided the right conditions for the condition ankylostomiasis (hookworm). They found 94% of the workforce was infected, along with telltale low haemoglobin levels, and skin eruptions called "bunches". Workers on long underground shifts defecated in the mine shafts in humid conditions, expelling hookworm that later entered the skin of other miners through their accidental contact with faeces, sometimes on boots, ladders or tools (often through their knees or arms as they crawled along shafts). The mine is an important case study for epidemiologists because very rarely in Britain were conditions damp and hot enough for hookworm to propagate.

== Mine captains ==
- Richard Trevithick, (father of the steam-locomotive inventor Richard Trevithick). Constructed the deep adit in 1765 and installed a Newcomen pumping engine in around 1775.
- Andrew Vivian, cousin & collaborator of the younger Richard Trevithick (resigned 1806).
- J. Rule (from 1806).
- William Petherick (died January 1844).
- Charles Thomas (from 1844 to 1867). Instigated the deep mining that discovered large quantities of tin ore.
- Josiah Thomas (from 1867 to 1895). Son of the above, continued his father's development of the mine. In 1876 he introduced boring machines operated by compressed air, and in 1892 the first set of Californian stamp mills. He was appointed managing director of the mine in 1895, and died in October 1901.
- Arthur Thomas (from 1895 to ?). Son of the above.

== Mineral Statistics ==
From Robert Hunt's Mineral Statistics of the United Kingdom.

Copper Production (1845-1910)
Year(s)	Ore (Tons)	Metal (Tons)	Value (£)
1845	3,504.00	233.70	16,996.80
1846	2,156.00	138.60	9,546.50
1847	2,057.00	135.40	9,414.80
1848	1,254.00	95.10	5,587.80
1849	1,028.00	77.50	5,197.40
1850	1,115.00	72.60	4,909.20
1851	801.00	55.40	3,625.90
1852	832.00	42.70	3,344.60
1853	1,040.00	51.90	4,920.00
1854	992.00	45.50	4,313.50
1855	711.00	28.30	2,634.10
1856	617.00	24.40	1,998.40
1857	566.00	25.90	2,429.90
1858	593.00	34.40	3,085.40
1859	757.00	38.70	3,531.70
1860	712.00	28.70	2,426.70
1861	417.00	18.90	1,589.00
1862	508.00	29.80	2,357.70
1863	636.00	39.80	3,029.20
1864	621.00	39.20	3,288.80
1865	607.00	44.70	3,510.40
1866	688.00	52.10	3,512.20
1867	267.00	15.90	1,068.10
1868	153.00	12.60	863.80
1869	153.00	10.60	648.60
1870	57.00	3.80	224.10
1871	86.00	5.60	326.10
1872	46.00	3.20	215.50
1873	16.00	1.10	78.40
1874	75.00	5.80	420.30
1876	41.00	2.40	162.60
1877	30.30	2.10	112.30
1878	13.60	0.60	27.40
1879	4.20	0.10	12.00
1889	3.00	..	10.00
1899	4.00	..	23.00
1907	15.00	..	96.00
1908	172.00	..	806.00
1909	88.00	..	519.00
1910	37.00	..	133.00

Tin Production (1853-1927)
Year(s)	Black (Tons)	Value (£)
1853	360.00	22,680.00
1854	363.50	25,261.10
1855	352.40	23,169.80
1856	416.70	30,727.00
1857	544.00	42,880.10
1858	635.50	41,859.20
1859	723.90	53,506.20
1860	805.10	64,974.80
1861	864.40	63,862.50
1862	1,246.40	83,806.00
1863	1,026.50	69,741.70
1864	1,029.90	66,959.20
1865	944.50	53,238.00
1866	919.40	46,120.50
1867	847.90	46,169.90
1868	984.20	55,847.70
1869	813.40	59,694.10
1870	1,034.80	78,601.10
1871	1,169.90	95,373.10
1872	1,284.80	114,550.00
1873	1,045.30	82,880.30
1874	1,121.00	65,558.80
1875	1,241.50	65,346.70
1876	1,263.30	55,825.40
1877	1,404.70	59,700.70
1878	1,539.10	55,902.80
1879	1,780.40	71,216.00
1880	1,737.30	93,702.00
1881	1,816.30	102,039.00
1882	1,976.20	120,244.00
1883	1,875.60	101,707.00
1884	2,423.20	113,965.00
1885	2,555.20	124,998.00
1886	2,383.00	134,881.00
1887	2,366.00	152,241.00
1888	2,239.00	148,734.00
1889	2,125.00	114,029.00
1890	2,023.50	110,696.00
1891	2,131.60	114,761.00
1892	2,535.00	139,818.00
1893	2,421.40	124,841.00
1894	2,126.00	89,347.00
1895	1,766.00	68,389.00
1896	2,039.30	75,142.00
1897	2,095.00	79,397.00
1898	2,302.30	99,719.00
1899	2,078.90	151,874.00
1900	2,004.40	164,116.00
1901	2,035.60	143,808.00
1902	1,828.50	131,885.00
1903	1,739.90	133,458.00
1904	1,705.20	129,619.00
1905	1,696.90	146,981.00
1906	1,813.90	198,642.00
1907	1,708.00	184,644.00
1908	1,782.80	142,007.00
1909	1,904.40	154,276.00
1910	1,730.80	161,460.00
1911	1,705.90	198,696.00
1912	1,665.00	217,217.00
1913	1,525.10	185,637.00
1914	1,438.00	127,216.00
1915	1,186.00	112,237.00
1916	1,077.00	110,808.00
1917	967.50	130,695.00
1918	826.00	156,020.00
1919	732.00	102,059.00
1920	339.00	70,752.00
1921-1922	no-details	..
1927	104.00	15,105.00

Employment (1878-1922)
Year(s)	Total	Overground	Underground
1878	1,041	636	405
1879	1,085	653	432
1880	936	458	478
1881	1,197	637	560
1882	1,258	640	618
1883	1,316	703	613
1884	1,311	685	626
1885	1,298	700	598
1886	1,250	754	496
1887	1,281	695	586
1888	1,297	687	610
1889	1,317	712	605
1890	1,302	698	604
1891	1,283	659	624
1892	1,336	745	591
1893	1,356	696	660
1894	1,309	710	599
1895	1,168	602	566
1896	1,307	603	704
1897	1,366	631	735
1898	1,204	554	650
1899	1,338	595	743
1900	1,379	606	773
1901	1,309	609	700
1902	1,267	550	717
1903	1,178	513	665
1904	1,119	484	635
1905	1,101	464	637
1906	1,142	469	673
1907	1,225	507	718
1908	1,128	481	647
1909	1,142	470	672
1910	1,064	471	593
1911	1,023	475	548
1912	1,050	481	569
1913	1,091	473	618
1914	996	..	..
1914	854	409	445
1915	755	..	..
1915	686	337	349
1916	614	..	..
1916	664	342	322
1917	672	..	..
1917	618	338	280
1918	594	340	254
1918	594	340	254
1919	685	336	349
1919	685	336	349
1920	447	256	191
1921	86	86	..
1922	10	10	..

== See also ==
- South Crofty
- Mining in Cornwall
- Camborne School of Mines
- John Harris (poet) Cornish poet

== Sources ==
- Morrison, T. A. (1983). Cornwall's Central Mines: The Southern District 1810-1895. Penzance: Alison Hodge. pp. 11–60. ISBN 0-906720-11-7.
- Trounson, J. H.; Bullen, L. J. (1999). "Dolcoath". Mining in Cornwall. Volume One: The Central District. Stroud: Tempus Publishing Ltd. pp. 35–54. ISBN 0-7524-1707-X.
