= Templeton, Devon =

Hamlet in Devon, England

Coordinates: 50°54′51″N 3°35′06″W

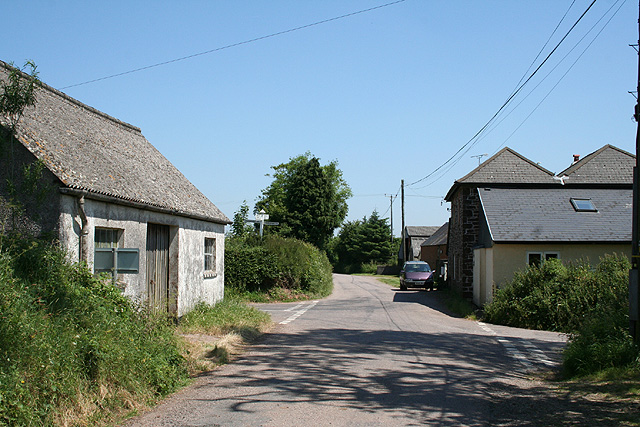
an image of Templeton, Devon

Templeton is a hamlet, parish and former manor in Devon, England, situated 4 miles west of Tiverton. The parish church is dedicated to St Margaret.

== History ==
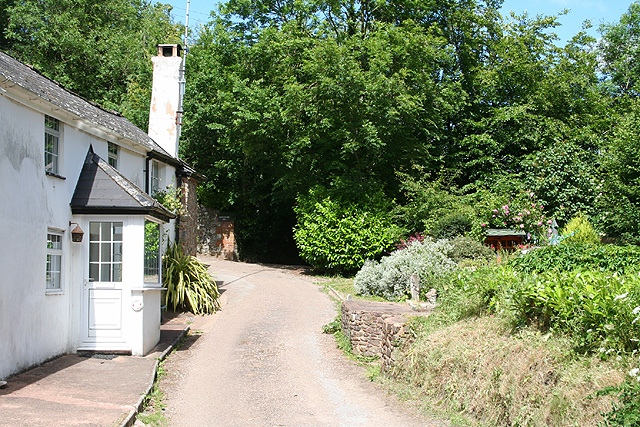
Near Templeton Bridge

According to the Devon historian Sir William Pole (d.1635), who was an owner of the manor, Templeton was a possession of the Knights Templar, and after the suppression of that order in 1312 passed to the Knights Hospitaller of St John. Following the Dissolution of the Monasteries by King Henry VIII (1509-1547) Templeton was taken into the ownership of the Crown, and was re-granted by that king to George Loosemore, whose son Robert Loosemore sold it to Sir William Peryam (1534-1604) of Little Fulford, near Crediton in Devon, Lord Chief Baron of the Exchequer. On the marriage of his eldest daughter Mary Peryam, to Sir William Pole (d.1635), MP, of Shute, Devon, as part of her marriage settlement he conveyed the manor of Templeton to her husband. It was still in the possession of Sir William Pole at the time of writing his great work Collections Towards a Description of the County of Devon. It remained in the Pole family for several generations until it was sold by Sir William's descendant Sir John William de la Pole, 6th Baronet (1757–1799) of New Shute House, Devon.

== Sources ==
- Pole, Sir William (d.1635), Collections Towards a Description of the County of Devon, Sir John-William de la Pole (ed.), London, 1791, pp. 441–2, Templeton
