= Christopher Pole-Carew =

British newspaper editor (1931–2020)

Christopher Gerald Pole-Carew
- Born: 17 May 1931
- Died: 12 February 2020 (aged 88)
- Education: Great Walstead School
- Occupation: Newspaper executive
- Known for: High Sheriff of Nottinghamshire in 1979, Newspaper executive, Trade Union disputes (as management)

Christopher Gerald Pole-Carew (17 May 1931 – 12 February 2020) was a British appointee as High Sheriff of Nottinghamshire in 1979. After serving in the Royal Navy, he was a newspaper executive, who rose to notoriety in his handling of trade union membership, initially as managing director of the Nottingham Evening Post. He sacked journalists who joined the trade union; or for going on strike with a pay demand lower than what they were currently receiving. Later he worked under Rupert Murdoch, where his role included trade union matters. The appointment brought comment in the House of Commons.

Pole-Carew was educated at Great Walstead School and the Royal Naval College, Dartmouth, from the age of 13.

Pole-Carew's appointment as High Sheriff of Nottinghamshire was the subject in 1979 of a House of Commons motion deploring it.

Although retired, Pole-Carew continued to hold two directorships.

Pole-Carew lived near Axminster, in Devon, with Gillian, his wife. Prior to this the Pole-Carews had been custodians for 20 years of Old Shute House, near Axminster, owned by the National Trust. Pole-Carew is a descendant of William Pole (1515–1587), MP for Bossiney, who purchased the Shute estate in 1560.

He died on 12 February 2020 at the age of 88.
