= Edward Pole =

English cricketer

Edward Pole (1 September 1805 – 22 May 1890) was an English cricketer with amateur status. He was associated with Oxford University and made his debut in 1827.

Pole was born at Barford St Martin, Wiltshire, where his father, also called Edward, was rector of the parish. He was educated at Exeter College, Oxford, then became a Church of England priest and was rector of Templeton, Devon, 1833–1879 and subsequently of Rackenford, Devon. He died at Tredis House, Sheviock, Cornwall, a home of the Pole family.

== Bibliography ==
- Haygarth, Arthur (1996) [1862]. Scores & Biographies, Volume 1 (1744–1826). Kennington: Frederick Lillywhite. ISBN 978-19-00592-23-9.
- Haygarth, Arthur (1997) [1862]. Scores & Biographies, Volume 2 (1827–1840). Kennington: Frederick Lillywhite. ISBN 978-19-00592-23-9.
