= New Shute House =

Country house near Axminster, Devon, England

Coordinates: 50.7677°N 3.0568°W

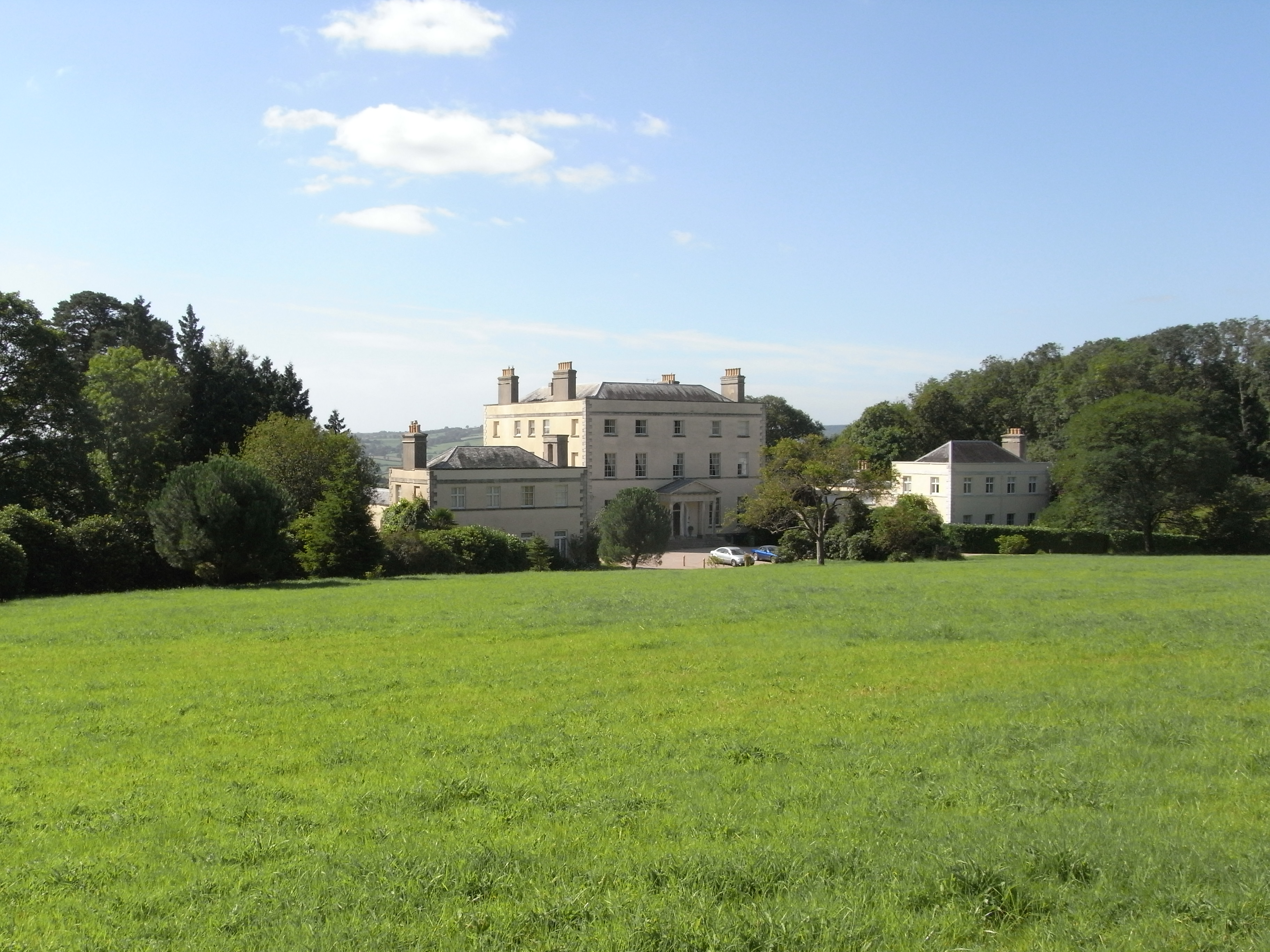
New Shute House, Axminster, Devon

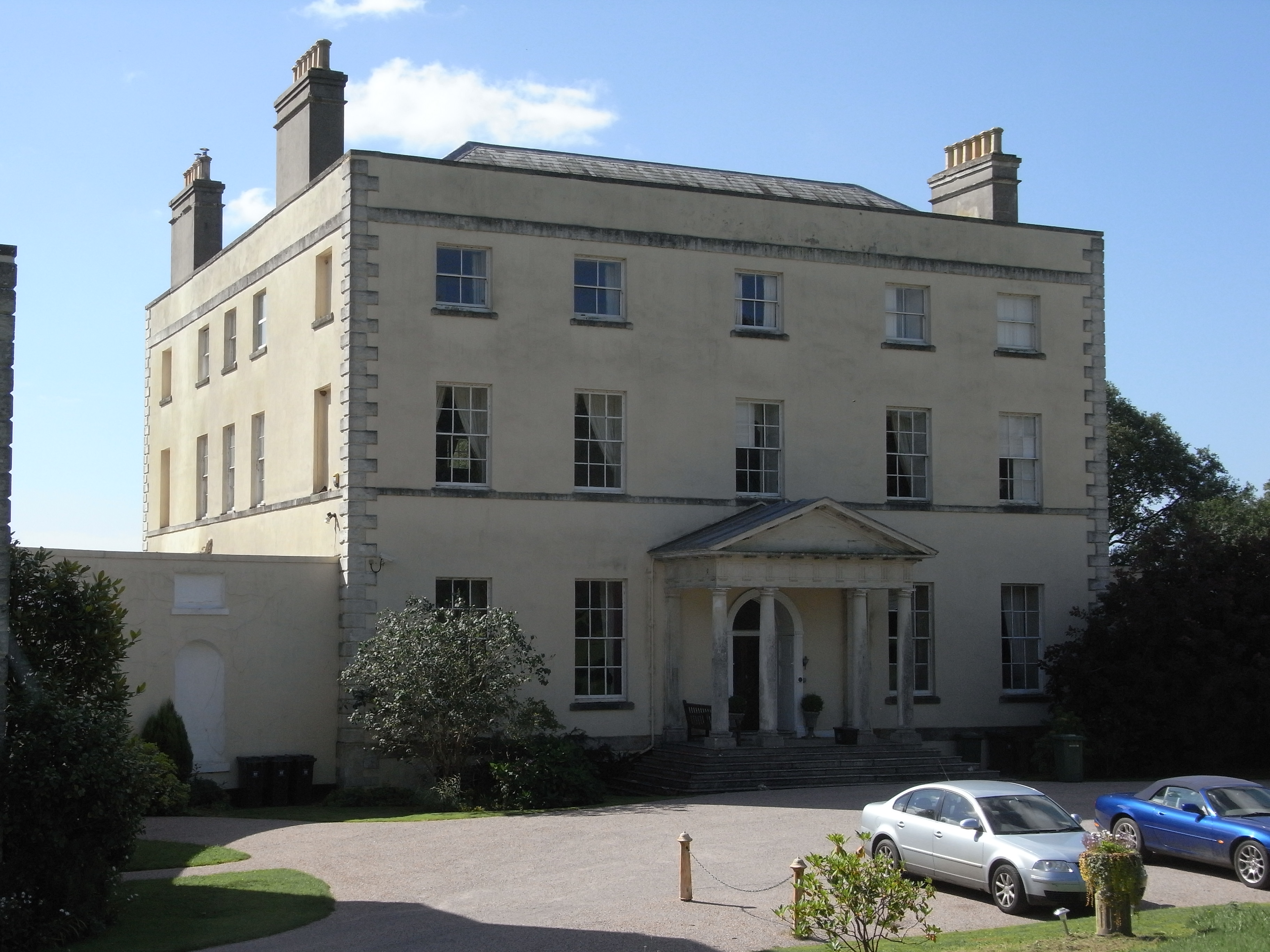
New Shute House, entrance front of central block

New Shute House is a late Palladian country house built between 1785 and 1789 by Sir John de la Pole, 6th Baronet (1757–1799) and is situated within the grounds of Old Shute House, in the parish of Shute, near Axminster, East Devon. It was given Grade II* listing on 8 May 1967. It was vacated by the Pole family in 1926 and was let between 1933 and 1974 to a girls' school. In 1974 it was sold by the family to a developer who converted it, together with stables and outbuildings, into 8 freehold apartments. It remains in private ownership and the main block has now been converted back into a single residence from the two vertically divided apartments created in 1974.

== History ==
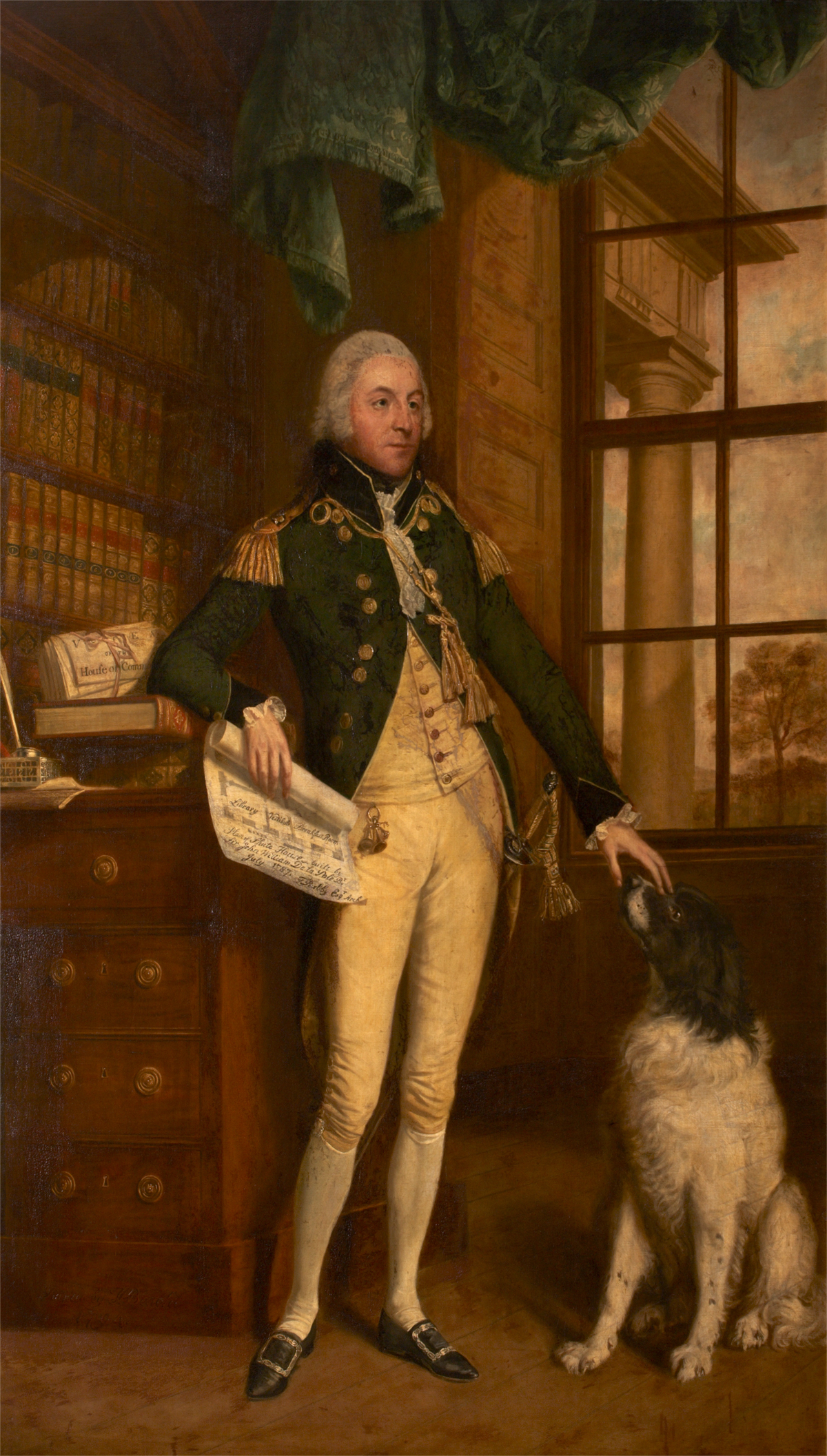
Sir John de la Pole, 6th Baronet (1757–1799), in uniform of Deputy Lieutenant of Devon, in the library of New Shute House, Devon, built by him between 1787 and 1789, holding a plan of his new house in his right hand. Portrait by Thomas Beach

The builder's 5 times great-grandfather William Pole Esquire (1515–1587), MP, had purchased Old Shute House in 1560 and had acquired a 1,200-year lease of the surrounding estate in 1562. The old house had been built in 1380 and had been substantially enlarged in the Tudor period and by William Pole's son Sir William Pole (1561–1635), the Antiquary. The 6th baronet, having determined to purchase the freehold of the Shute estate from the Petre family, which was completed in 1787, clearly considered the old house to be old-fashioned, and perhaps encouraged by his wife Anne Templer, whose father had just built Stover House in 1777 at Teigngrace near Newton Abbot, he decided to demolish half of it and build a new Palladian house about 1/2 a mile to the south. The demolition was carried out in 1785. The contemporary historiam Polwhele wrote in about 1806:

"Sir John William de la Pole lately destroyed a great part of a very old seate within the manor of Shute, called Shute House. He has now finished another upon a larger scale. New Shute House, begun in 1787, is distant from the old mansion two furlongs south east. It is pleasantly situated under Shute Hill. The aspect is nearly south by east. It is a beautiful three quarter view in front with a very handsonme lawn. The English Channel is distant about four miles".

The decision to build was certainly a hasty one as a field of growing corn was cut down to lay the foundations. The family moved to temporary lodging at Colyton House in nearby Colyton where they remained for two years. That part at least of the ancient mansion has survived is unusual, as often in the case of 18th. century re-builds the new house was built on the exact site of the old, which was either completely demolished or incorporated beyond recognition into the new structure. Clearly the old site was considered unsuitable, perhaps being too close to the village and parish church of Shute, and whilst the mediaeval house may have been sited with its defensibility as a prime criterion, the new site was more spectacular and had views to the sea.

=== 20th century ===
In 1926 the owner of the Shute Estate, Sir Frederick de la Pole, 11th Baronet, died, and his distant cousin Sir John Carew Pole, 12th Baronet succeeded as the Pole Baronet of Shute House. As a result Pole legally charged his surname from Pole Carew to Carew Pole in 1926; for the remainder of his life he was styled as Sir John Carew Pole, 12th Bt.

Under the terms of Sir Frederick de la Pole's will, Shute House was to be placed in a trust for John, with a remainder to his male heirs. In addition to the early-Georgian New Shute House, the estate then also comprised Old Shute House, Haddon House, and 4,339 acres spread across the Parishes of Shute, Colyton and Southleigh. Sir Frederick also bequeathed his residuary personal estate to the Shute Estate Trust; the total value had been proved at a gross value of £153,915 for probate, with a net value of £61,745. Sir John lived at Shute House until c. 1928; he had vacated the property by early 1929 owing to the costs of death duties on the 11th Baronet's estate as well as the ongoing depression in income from agriculture.

An auction of the entire Shute Estate was held on 16 October 1929; the auctioneer reportedly suggested an opening bid of £100,000 for the entire estate, but no bids were forthcoming. Various minor holdings, farms and fishing rights were sold for a total of £13,140. Many of the historic portraits hung at Shute were subsequently transferred to Sir John's main residence Antony House, Cornwall in 1930, and Shute House was subsequently let and used as a school until the mid-1950s. Following the closure of the school Sir John sold Shute House in 1956; advertisements for the sale published in the Daily Telegraph in September 1956 stated that the estate then comprised 1,111 acres, with an annual rental income of £2,425. The Medieval Old Shute House was not included in the sale of the Shute Estate, and Sir John subsequently gifted this property to the National Trust.

== Architect ==
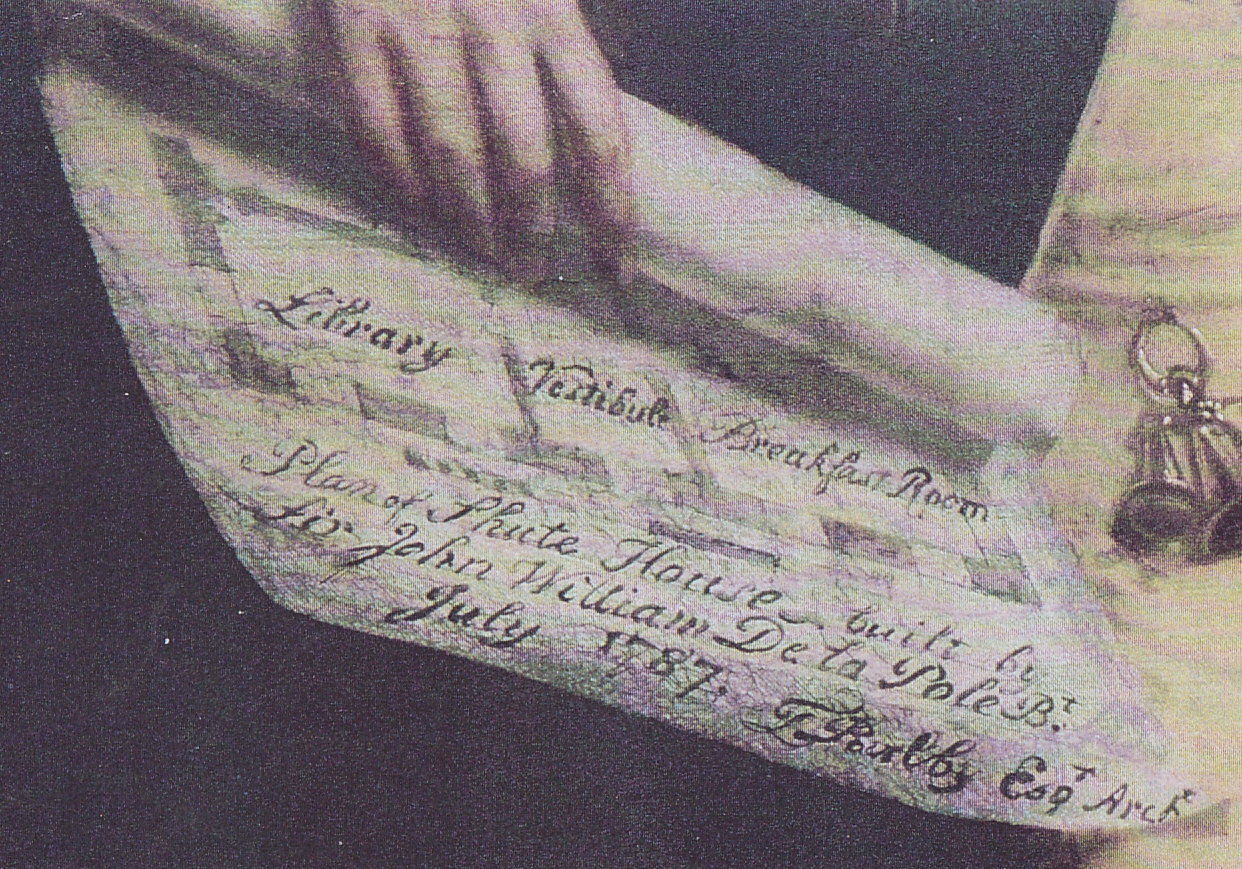
Detail from pertrait by Thomas Beach of Sir John de la Pole, 6th Baronet, showing writing on the scroll held in his right hand: "Plan of Shute House built by Sir John William De la Pole Bt. July 1787, T. Parlby Esqr. Archt."

The identity of the architect as Thomas Parlby, the uncle of Lady Anne Pole and business partner of her father the self made magnate James Templer, was first discovered by Maureen Turner in her 1999 MA dissertation. The identity had eluded both Pevsner and Bridie, the principal historian of the two buildings. Pevsner had written "One would like to know the architect of this handsome late Palladian composition of 1787". Whilst at Antony House in Cornwall researching the Pole family Turner inspected closely the roll of paper held in the right hand of Sir John Pole the builder in his portrait, and discovered thereon drawn a partial plan of the new house with the following words written beneath: "Plan of Shute House built by Sir John William De la Pole Bt. July 1787, T. Parlby Esqr. Archt." Thomas Parlby (1727–1802) was of humble origins, the son of John Parlby of Chatham, Kent or possibly from Gravesend. He was for all of his adult life one of a trio of business partners with John Line and James Templer (1722–1782), in the business of constructing dockyards, generally under government contract.

=== James Templer ===
James Templer 1722–1782) had married Mary Parlby (d.1784), his partner's sister, and his daughter was thus the future Lady Anne Pole. Templer was a self-made magnate. He was born in Exeter of a humble family, the son of Thomas Templer a brazier. He was orphaned young, whereupon his elder brother apprenticed him to John Bickley, a carpenter or architect of Exeter. He broke his indenture and set off for India where he made a fortune, either from government building contracts or possibly from dealing in silver bullion, before returning to England aged 23. He settled at Rotherhithe, Kent, where he obtained a government contract to re-build the dockyard with his partners John Line and Thomas Parlby. He married Mary Parlby (d.1784), the sister of his business partner and daughter of John Parlby of Chatham, Kent. He obtained with his partners in about 1760 the contract to rebuild Plymouth docks, for which he used granite from Haytor, and moved to Devon. In 1763 he obtained a grant of arms from the College of Arms, and in 1765 purchased the manor of Teignrace and Stover Lodge, which in 1780 he re-built in grander form on a nearby site. He died in 1782 and is commemorated by a monument in Teignrace Church, rebuilt in 1786 by his sons. Both Line and Parlby settled in Devon close to Templer, and both likewise each acquired a great country house and estate. John Line purchased Lindridge House, Bishopsteignton, which on his death he bequeathed to Templer's younger son and his own godson Henry Line Templer (d.1818), from whose heirs it was purchased by his elder brother Rev. John Templer (d.1832), and where Lady Anne Pole ended her days nursing her brother, as her mural monument in Shute Church states.

=== Thomas Parlby ===
Thomas Parlby (1727–1802) was described in his obituary in the Gentleman's Magaziner as "Master Mason of HM Docks". Parlby married in 1748 Lydia Martyn. He resided at Stone Hall, Stonehouse, in Plymouth, "the big house overlooking Stonehouse Pool". He rebuilt the old chapel at Stonehouse in 1787 and his 1802 monument, by Peter Rouw of London (who also made the monuments to Sir John Pole and his wife Lady Anne in Shute Church), was situated in the new church, apparently destroyed by World War II bombing. Templer and Parlby were the government contractors who rebuilt Plymouth Dockyard in 1763, and nearly doubled it in size by levelling the hill to the south and replacing all the buildings except the officers' accommodation. One of these docks is still known as "Parlby Dock". The same partnership also built between 1779 and 1785 in the classical style the Royal Marine Barracks on Durnford Street, Stonehouse, Plymouth, which still survive on three sides of a courtyard now closed by 19th-century additions, described by Copper Plate Magazine as " a fine pile of buildings". Parlby also in a smaller commission rebuilt the kitchens at Saltram House after the fire of 1778, "a fine lofty room with a coved ceiling". Parlby had the following progeny:

- Priscilla Parlby
- James Templer Parlby (d.1826), so named no-doubt from Templer having been his godfather, is commemorated by a monument at Berhampore, Bengal, India as follows: "Sacred to the Memory of Lieutenant-Colonel Commandant James Templer Parlby, of the Corps of Engineers, who died on the 1st December 1826, during a very long residence at Berhampore. He displayed the virtues which characterize and adorn the English gentleman, and his Monument is erected by his friends at the station as a memorial of their attachment, aged 64 years"
- John Alexander Parlby (d.1849), JP, who married in 1792 Laetitia Hall (d.1848), daughter and co-heir of Humphrey Hall of Manadon, Crown Hill, Plymouth and Goldings, Herts, by his wife Jane St John, daughter of John St John, 10th Baron St John. The mansion of Manadon, built in 1681, is now the administrative headquarters of the Royal Naval Engineering College, Tavistock Road, Manadon.

Cecil St John Hall Parlby (b. 1912) still owned Manadon in 1937, and was also lord of the manors of Weston Peverell and Sampford Spiney. His brother John Reginald Hall Parlby (b. 1916) in 1937 lived at Stonehouse, Bishop's Hill, Taunton.

== Construction ==
The house was built using labour from distant Plymouth, as an invoice dated 1798 from a builder of that city named John Bellman reveals. The travelling costs of various workmen between Plymouth and Shute were also charged. These men were therefore probably favoured tradesmen used before by Parlby, as more local Exeter labour appears not to have been used.

== Description ==
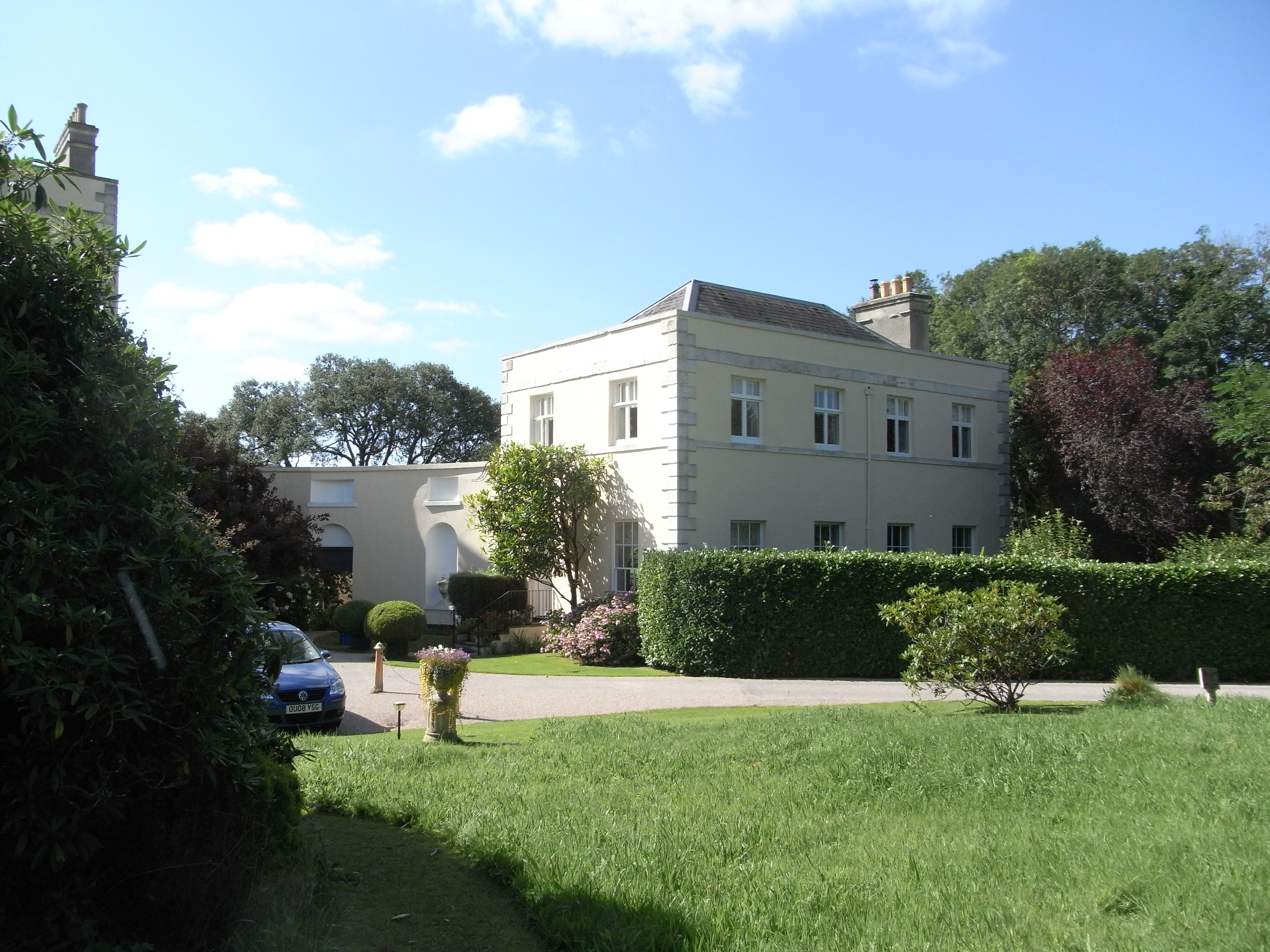
West pavilion, formerly the chapel, New Shute House

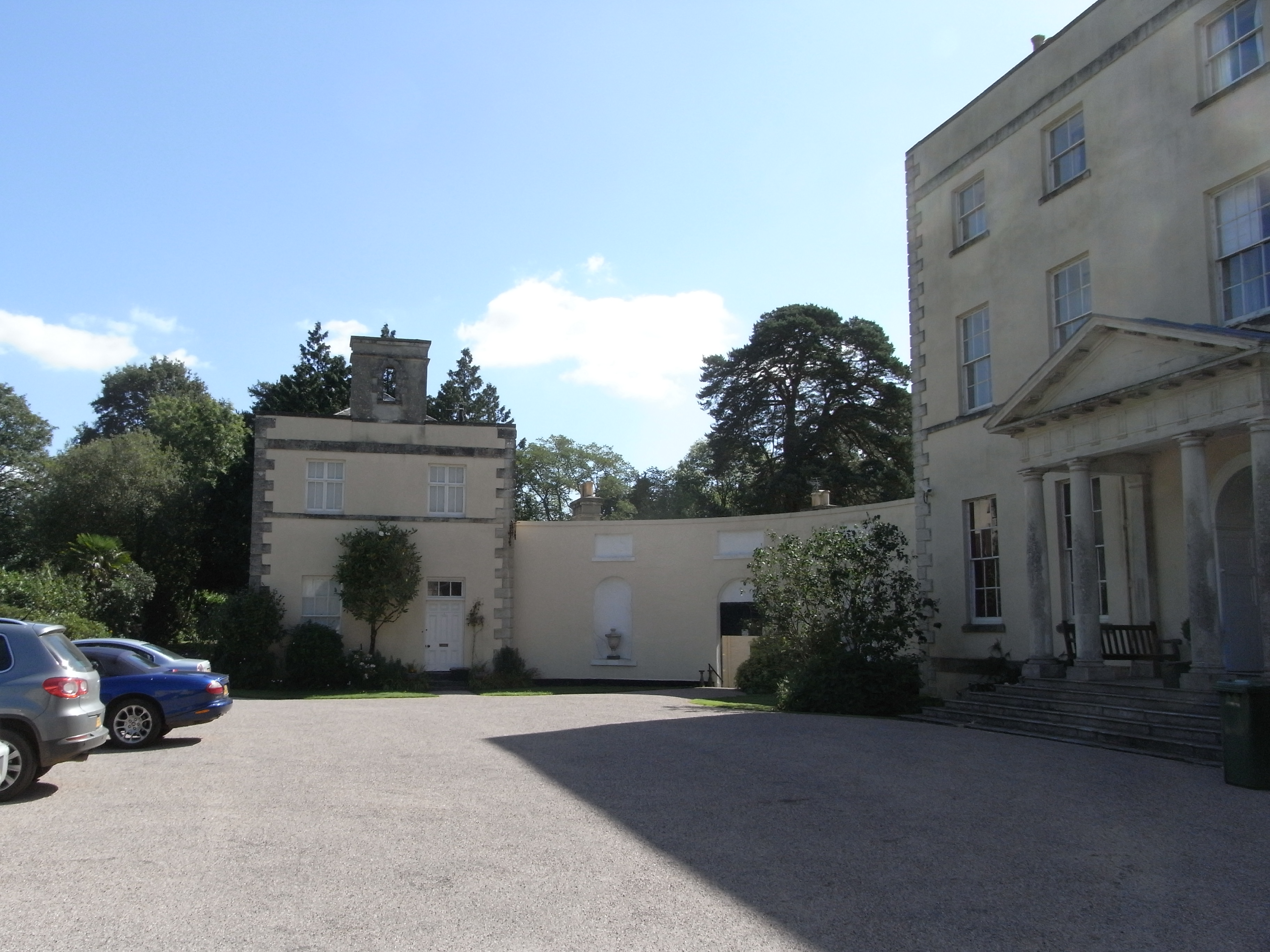
East pavilion, New Shute House, originally the kitchen block, later converted into a theatre, now converted to an apartment

The house consists of a central stuccoed block of three floors with a basement divided into five bays, with a flanking pavilion of two stories in four bays, to either side connected by low flanking quadrant walls. In the centre of the front is a large classical pedimented portico fronted by four Ionic columns. The flanking walls screen the service wings behind. The rear elevation has on either side full-height semi-circular bays. The interior contains much Adam style decorative plasterwork, apparently the work of a certain Mr Powell referred to in the invoice from the builder Bellman, and ornamental fittings. Robert Adam did much work for the Parkers at Saltram House near Plymouth between 1768–72 and 1779–82. The Poles are likely to have been guests at their neighbours at this time, but in any case as they also spent much time in London at their house in Bedford Square, they would have been familiar with Adam's work in London and elsewhere. The north-east pavilion contains a theatre of c. 1900. The top floor housed the servants' quarters. The kitchens were originally situated in the left hand pavilion, later converted into a theatre. A large Palladian style stables block is situated around a semi-circular courtyard, several hundred yards from the house, now converted into several separate residences. It had stabling for twelve horses and accommodation for grooms.

=== Interior ===
The front door opens into a vestibule or hall 15 ft wide which runs to the rear wall of the house. To the left is the Library, in which was painted the portrait by Thomas Beach of Sir John Pole, in which the portico is visible through the window. It contained originally a large Sheraton book-case 11 ft wide and 10 ft high. Further back on the left-hand side beyond a small parlour or smoking room and service staircase lobby, is the Drawing room, 35 ft in length, with full-width bay window in its rear wall, giving extensive views towards the sea. The plasterwork by Bellman on the ceiling of the bay shows the signs of the Zodiac arranged as a semi-circle, with at the centre the Pole coat of arms. The hall is crossed from the drawing room to reach the slightly longer Dining room (40 * 23 ft, 15 ft high), also with full width bay window and containing Corinthian columns. In the Dining Room was hung the famous and immensely valuable life-size portrait of Lady Anne Pole by Romney, and the matching one of her husband. At the front of the house on the right-hand side is the Breakfast Room, as shown on the plan held in his hand in the portrait of Sir John Pole. The main staircase, of shallow-stepped cantilever design without visible support, made from Portland stone, is situated at the rear of the hall and runs around three walls, the rear wall of the house and the two side walls of the hall. On the first floor landing is a large stained glass window displaying the Pole crest. The present house retains most of the original fittings and decorative plasterwork.

=== Grounds ===
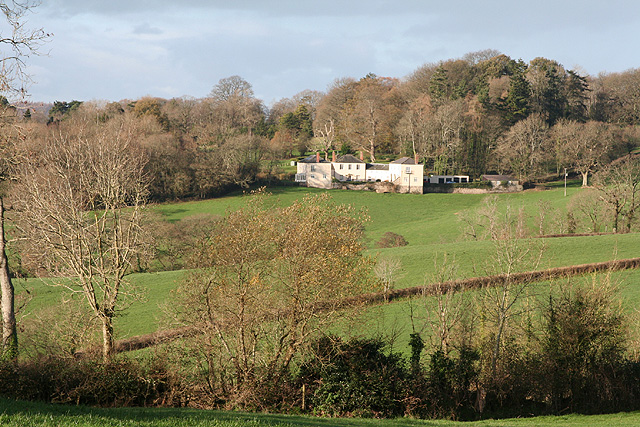
The stable block, New Shute House

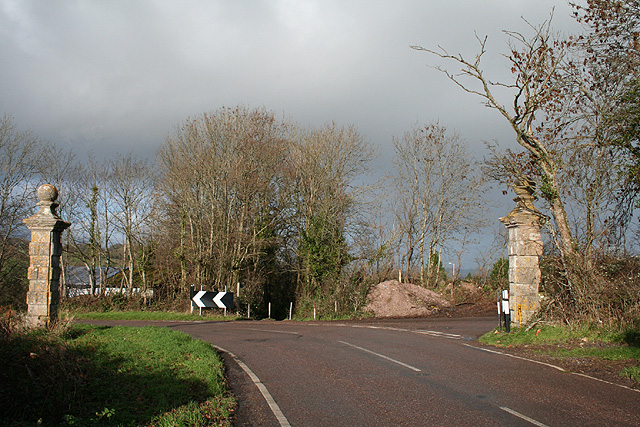
"Shute Pillars", marking the boundary of the former Shute estate

The site of New Shute House is sloping from the front to the back of the house, which allows for an uninterrupted view of the distant sea. The Poles may have been influenced by the landscaping at Mount Edgecumbe House near Plymouth, Saltram and Killerton House. Pole employed John Veitch, Sir Thomas Acland's head gardener at Killerton, as his landscape designer, who contracted in 1790 to complete the works, which included the making of new roads and fences, by 29 September 1794. Pole planted a large number of young trees, including 1,000 larch and 950 Spruce, as an invoice from the firm Gould Smith dated November 1797 records. Veitch also made the new road to Shute village beyond the Elizabethan Shute Gatehouse ("the Old Lodge") and onward to the road leading to "Shute Piers", about one mile away. The contract specifies: "Toward the lodge...let the road be sunk three feet deeper than the ground is at present as it passes between the Old House and the Church to give more room under the Lodge and also to produce ground for forming the plantation each side intended to cover the said Old House, stables and the churchyard; also to form a plantation ground by raising it up for planting against the walls on each side of the lodge so as when planted and grown-up the said lodge may only appear between the said plantations". Bridie had noted in her work that the lower windows of the gatehouse were now below ground level, but had not ascertained the reason.
