= Great Walstead School =

Location
- Lindfield; Haywards Heath, West Sussex, RH16 2QL; England; 51.00686°N 0.05486°W

Information
- Type: Preparatory School
- Religious affiliation: Christian
- Established: 1925
- Local authority: West Sussex
- Department for Education URN: 126135 Tables
- Gender: Coeducational
- Age: 2 to 13
- Enrolment: up to 446
- Houses: Carey; Grenfell; Livingstone; Mowll
- Colours: Navy Blue and Pink
- Website: http://www.greatwalstead.co.uk

Great Walstead School is an independent prep school for children aged 2.5 to 13 years.

Based in Lindfield, West Sussex in 265 acres of countryside, with woodland, streams, Forest School and a secret garden.

== History ==
The school was founded in 1925 by Robert James Mowll (1895–1963), the last Baron Mowll of the Cinque Ports. It was originally situated at Enfield, north London and known as Kilvinton Hall school. The school was moved to its current location in 1927 and was renamed Great Walstead school. Headmasters since Mr Mowll have been Gordon Parke (1960), Nick Bawtree (1986), Hugh Lowries (1991), the Reverend Jeremy Sykes (2006), Colin Baty (2010) and Chris Calvey (2017)

== Controversy ==
In 2003, a staff member was detained under Operation Ore.

== Notable alumni ==
- Christopher Pole-Carew, in 1979 High Sheriff of Nottinghamshire, and newspaper executive
