= William Pole (died 1587) =

Member of the Parliament of England

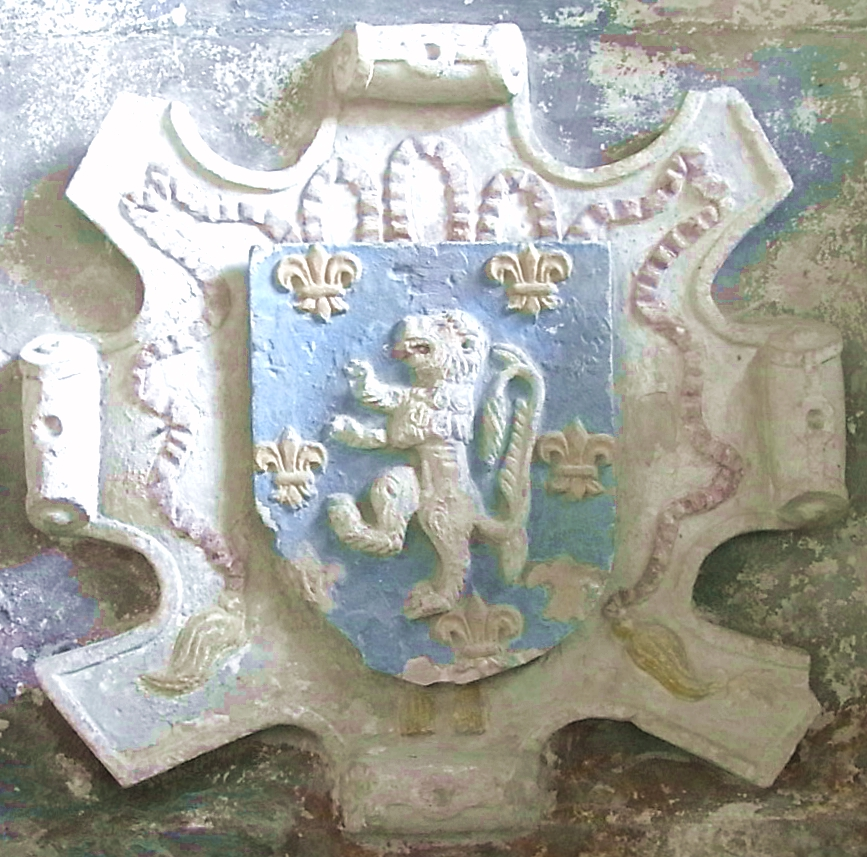
Arms of Pole of Cheshire and of Shute, Devon: Azure semé of fleurs de lis or, a lion rampant argent. Arms shown on strapwork surround on base of monument to Katherine Popham (d.1588), wife of William Pole (d.1587), Esquire, Pole Chapel, Colyton Church

William Pole (1515–1587), Esquire, was a lawyer and speculator in church lands following the Dissolution of the Monasteries who served as MP for Lyme Regis in 1545, Bridport in 1553 and for West Looe in 1559. He acquired lands in East Devon and was the founder of the influential and wealthy Pole family of Shute, Devon. He was the father of the famous Sir William Pole (1561-1635), the antiquary, historian of Devon.

== Origins ==
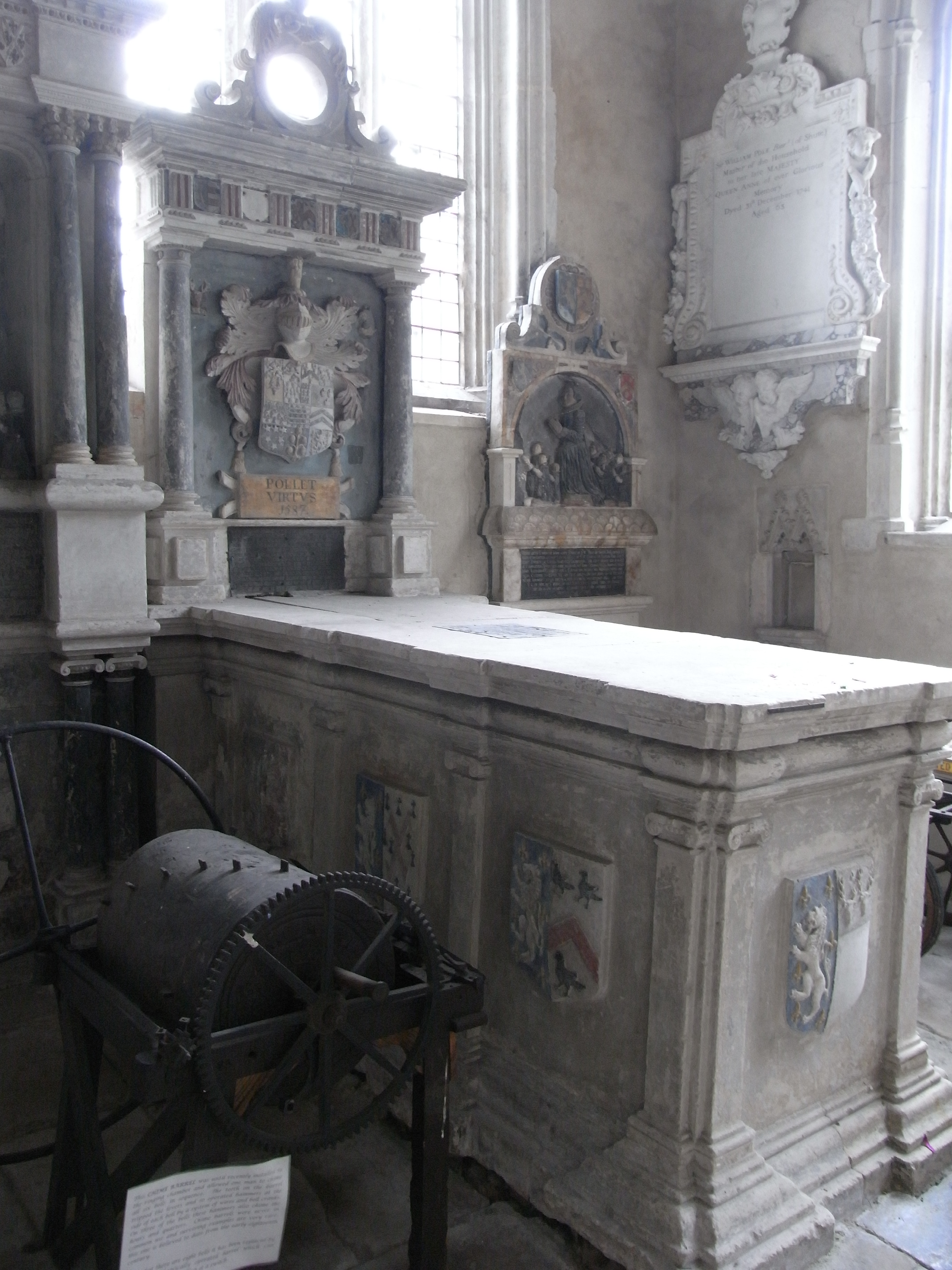
Monument of William Pole (d.1587), Pole Chapel, Colyton Church

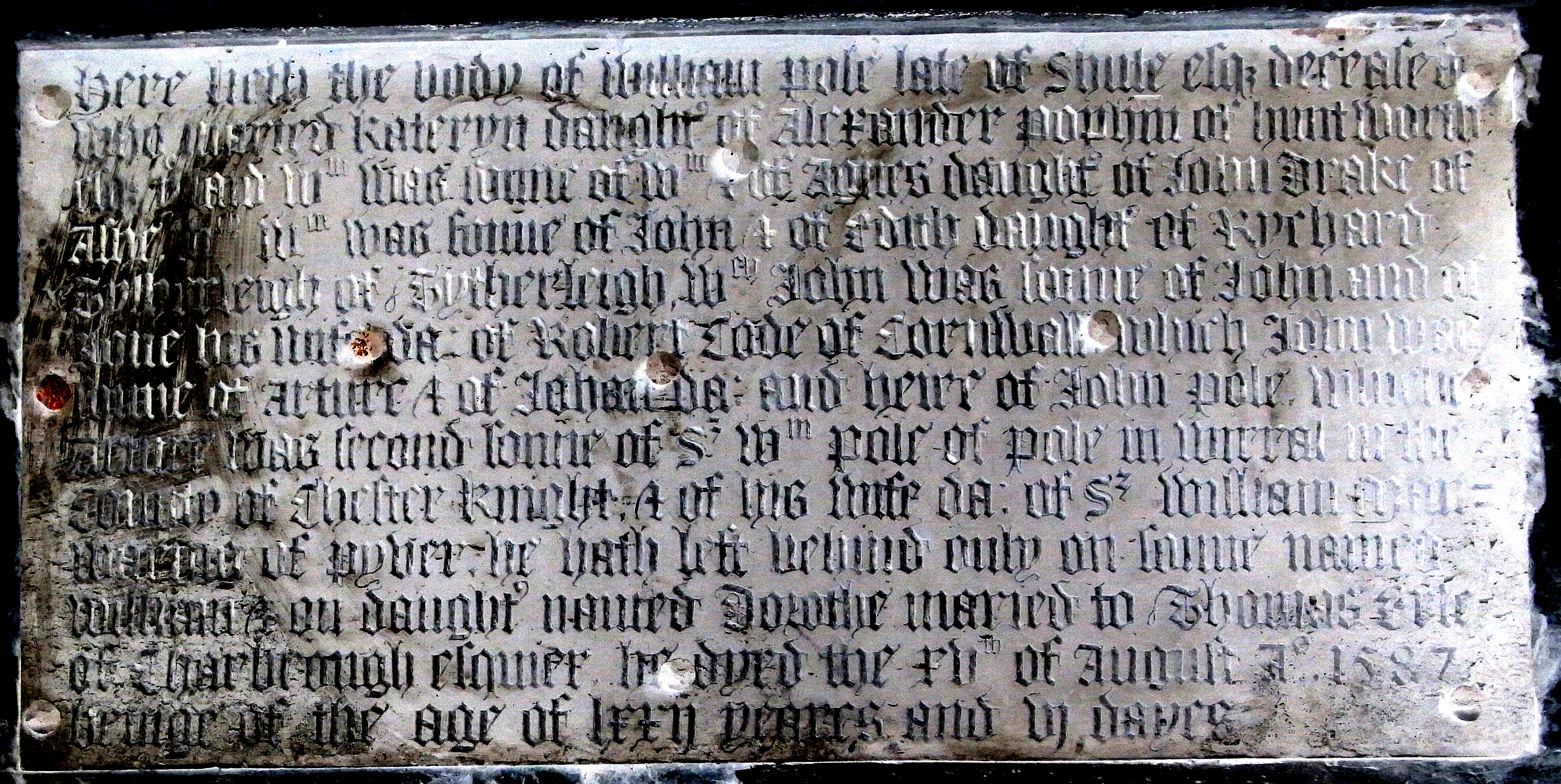
Genealogical brass inscription on monument of William Pole (d.1587), Pole Chapel, Colyton Church

He was the only son of William Pole (High Sheriff of Cheshire, appointed on or commencing on 30 November 1527) by his second wife Agnes Drake, daughter of John Drake of Ash in the parish of Musbury, Devon, an eminent and ancient Devon family. His full pedigree, showing his descent from the ancient family of "Pool" of Pool Hall, Wirral, Cheshire is inscribed on a brass plaque on his monument erected by his son the antiquary in the Pole Chapel in Colyton Church in Devon:

"Here lieth the body of William Pole late of Shute, Esq., deceased who maryd Kateryn daught. of Alexander Popham of Huntworth, Esq. Ye said Wm. was sonne of Wm. & of Agnes daught. of John Drake of Ashe wch. Wm. was sonne of John & of Edith daught of Rychard Tytherleigh of Tytherleigh; wch. John was sonne of John and of Jone his wife da. of Robert Code of Cornwall; which John was sonne of Arture & of Johan, da. and heire of John Pole; which Arture was second sonne of Sr. Wm. Pole of Pole in Wirral in the county of Chester, knight, & of his wife da. of Sr. William Manwaring of Pyver(?). He hath left behind only on sonne named William & on daught. names Dorothie maried to Thomas Erle of Charbrough, Esquier. He dyed the XVth of August A(nn)o 1587 beinge of the age of lxxii yeares and vi dayes".

Thus on his paternal side he was descended from the Pole family of Cheshire, into which family was married his great-great grandmother Johan Pole, the heiress of the Poles of Ford in the parish of Musbury, Devon, which were unrelated families bearing different armorials: The Poles of Cheshire bore: Azure seme of fleurs-de-lys a lion rampant argent, whilst the Devon Poles bore: A buck's head gules. The senior line of the Cheshire Poles had held the manor of Pool since the 13th century and remained seated there until the early 1820s. Pool Hall, demolished in about 1938, was a Tudor house re-built by Thomas Pole in about 1574, as indicated by that date having been carved on the hall fireplace. The east front of the house faced the River Mersey, and the site was purchased by Bowater Mersey Mills Paper Limited, paper manufacturers, which constructed a factory on the site in 1921, now known as "North Road, Ellesmere Port". In the 1840s the house was described by W. Mortimer as "the finest ancient manor house in Cheshire". The house, which had long been derelict, was destroyed to allow for later expansion of the works. The clock which once occupied a gable of the house was saved and is now situated in the Boat Museum of Ellesmere Port.

== Career ==
He studied law at the Inner Temple and before 1547 was elected Fellow of that institution, Bencher in 1556, Autumn Reader in 1557, Lent Reader in 1557 and was elected to the position of considerable trust of Treasurer in 1564. He served as JP of Devon and Dorset from about 1559, and as legal counsel to the town of Lyme Regis from about 1564.

== Lands acquired ==
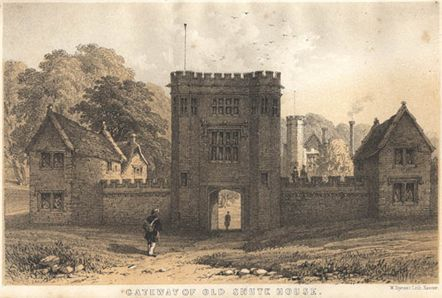
Elizabethan gateway of Old Shute House, believed to have been built by William Pole, Esq., shortly after his purchase of the house. He enlarged the house itself, but his work is indistinguishable from the works also effected by his son the antiquary

In 1560 at Colyford, Devon, he purchased from Sir William Petre, principal Secretary of State to Queen Mary I, the "house, materials and furniture" of Old Shute House, Colyton, for £300. This property thenceforth became the main seat of the family until it was given to the National Trust shortly after 1955. In 1562 he acquired from Petre a lease for 1,200 years of the Shute estate, the freehold of which was not purchased until 1788 by his descendant the 6th Pole baronet. By coincidence the Pole family of Ford in Devon were distantly descended from Alexander Bonville, a younger brother of Sir William II Bonville (d.1407), Sheriff of Somerset, Dorset and Devon, who built the mediaeval hall house at Shute in 1380. Alexander had married the heiress Hawise de la Forde, and thereafter had adopted for himself and his descendants the surname de la Forde. It was his great-great-granddaughter Johan Pole de la Forde who married Arthur Pole of the Cheshire Poles. He also acquired the manor of Charmouth, seven miles from Shute from Petre in 1575, and presented a silver chalice to Charmouth Church in that same year.

== Marriages and children ==
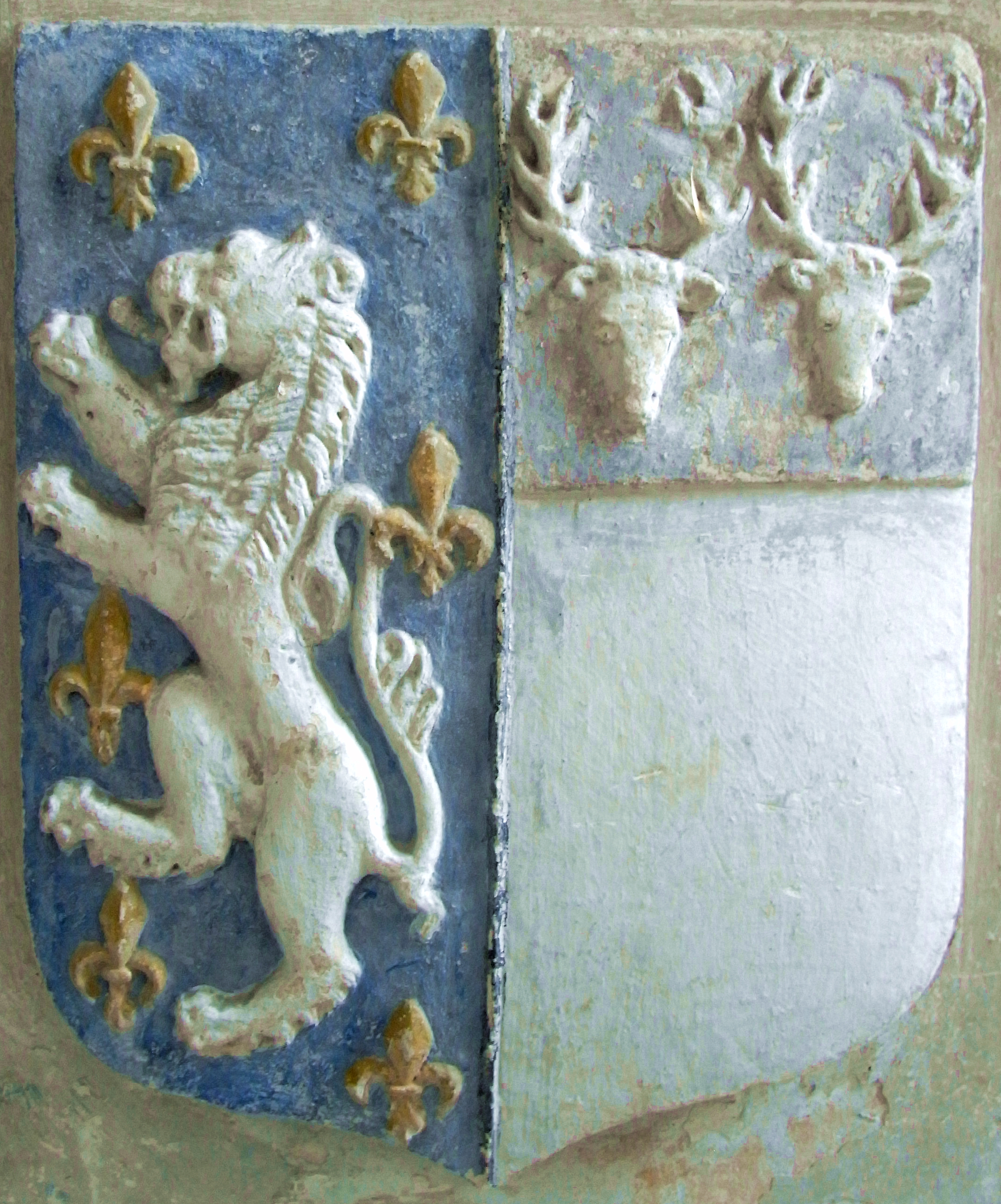
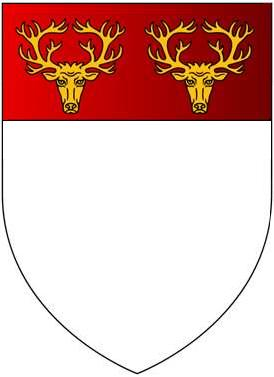
One of several escutcheons on monument of William Pole (d.1587), Colyton Church: left: Arms of Pole impaling Popham: Baron: azure seme of Fleurs-de-lys or a lion rampant argent (Pole) impaling femme: Argent, on a chief gules two buck's heads cabossed or (Popham); right: recreated arms of Popham

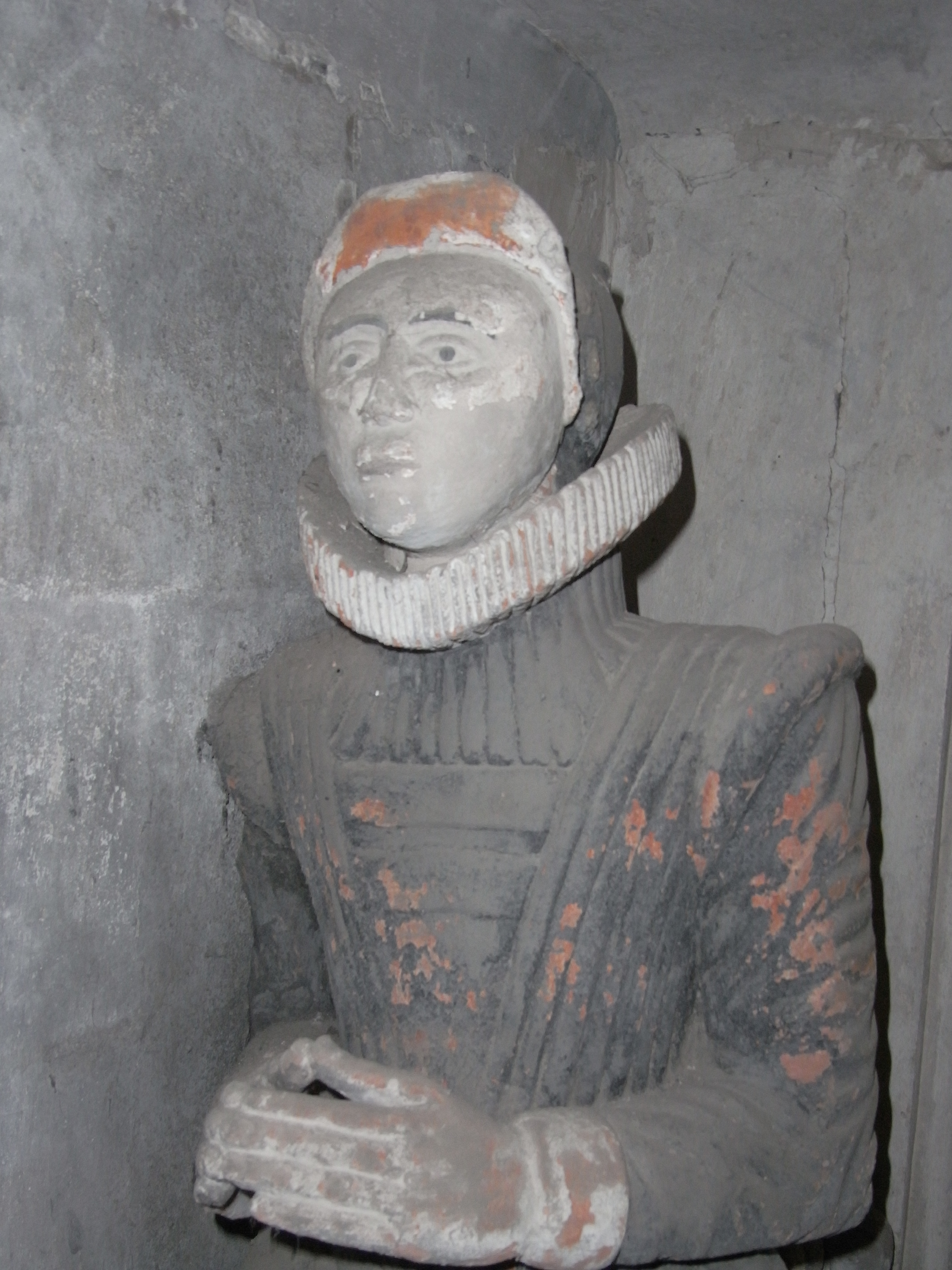
Effigy of Katherine Popham (d.1588), 2nd wife of William Pole (d.1587), Pole Chapel, Colyton Church

He married twice and produced children from the second marriage only:

- Firstly to Thomasine Tudboll (d.1556), daughter of John Tudboll (alias Tudbold), a merchant of Lyme Regis and Mayor of Lyme Regis in 1551, and twice a widow, firstly of John Strowbridge (d.1539) of Streat Hayne in the parish of Colyton and secondly of William Beamonte (d.1547), probably a scion of the Beaumont family lords of the manor of Gittisham.
- Secondly, before 1559, to Katherine Popham, (d.1588), daughter of Alexander Popham, MP, of Huntworth, Somerset, and sister of Sir John Popham (d.1607), Lord Chief Justice. By his second wife he had seven children, only two of whom lived beyond childhood, as is stated on the brass plaque on his monument and on the monument of his wife Katherine Popham, erected by his son the antiquary in the Pole Chapel in Colyton Church:
  - Sir William Pole (1561-1635), the antiquary, MP.
  - Dorothie Pole, married firstly Thomas Erle of Charbrough, secondly Sir Walter Vaughan.
  - Alexander (died young)
  - Hugh (died young)
  - Richard (died young)
  - Arthur (died young)
  - Amy (died young)

== Monument to Katherine Popham ==
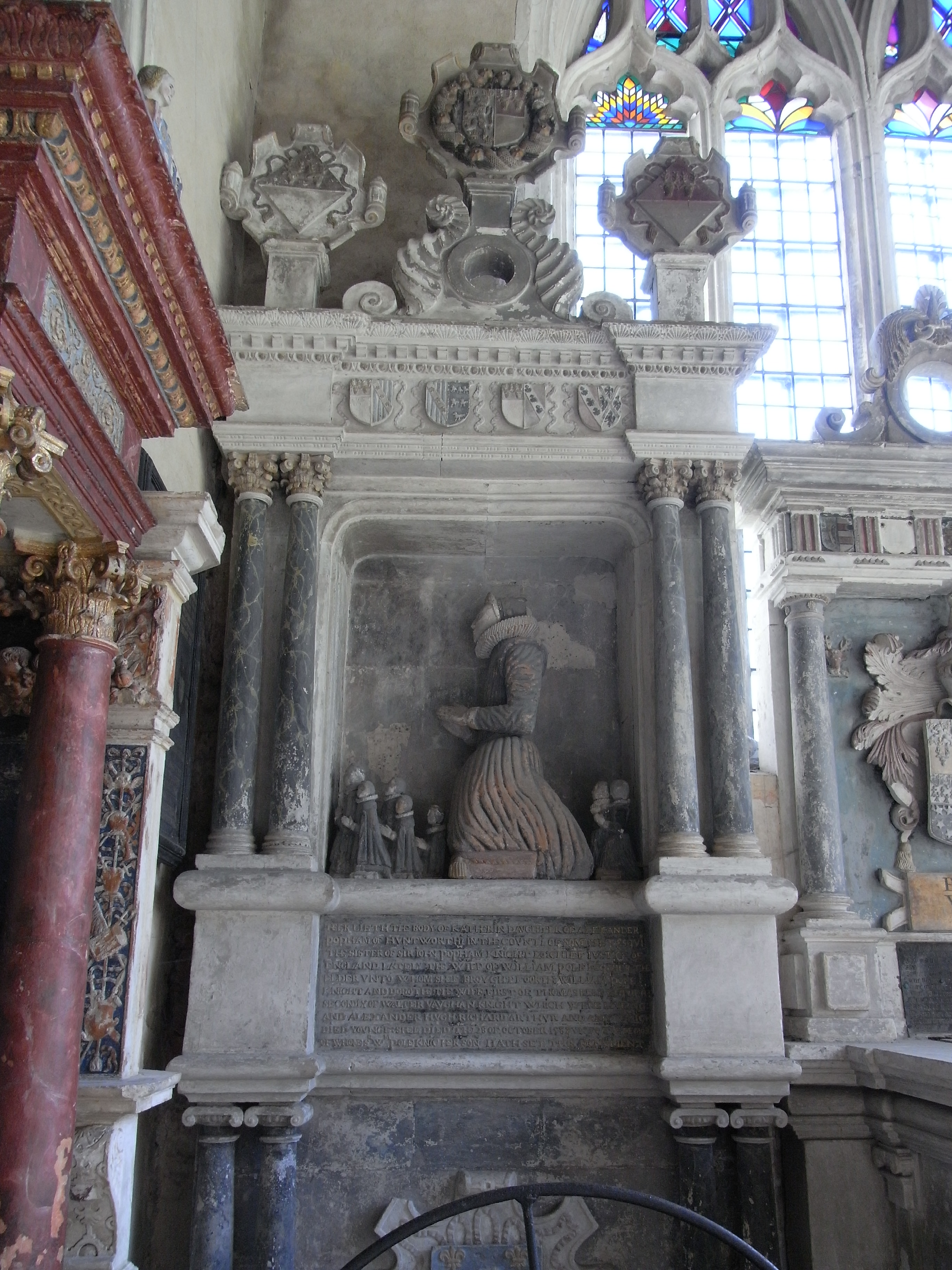
Monument to Katherine Popham (d.1588), wife of William Pole (1515-1587), Pole Chapel, Colyton Church. To the left is the red marbleised monument of her grandson Sir John Pole, 1st Baronet (d.1658) and to the left is the monument to her husband. On the base of her monument is a large depiction of the Pole arms on a white strapwork surround

The monument to Katherine Popham (d.1588) stands adjacent to the left (north) of the monument to her husband William Pole (d.1587), and shows her kneeling surrounded by her seven children. Underneath is a tablet with the following inscription in relief:

"Heer lieth the body of Katherin daughter of Alexander Popham of Huntworthi in the counti of Somerset Esquir., the sister of Sir John Popham, knight, Lo. Chief Justice of England, lately the wief of William Pole Esquier the Elder unto whom shee brought foorth William Pole, knight, and Dorothe the wife first of Thomas Erle Esquier, secondly of Walter Vaughan, knight, which were liveing and Alexander, Hugh, Richard, Arthur and Amy which died younge. She died the 28 of October 1588 unto the memori of whome Sr. Wm. Pole Knig. her son hath set this monument".

Four shields with armorials are displayed on the frieze of the monument supported by two pairs of Corinthian columns, as follows:

- Popham impaling Stradling: Paly of six argent and azure, on a bend gules three cinquefoils or. Joan Stradling of St Donat's Castle, Glamorgan, was Katherine's mother.
- Stradling impaling Arundell: Sable, six hirondelles 3,2,1, argent.
- Popham impaling Knoell: Gules, on a bend argent three escallops sable. Isabel Knoell was JKatherine's paternal grandmother.
- Knoell impaling Hampden: Argent, a saltire gules between four eagles displayed azure

== Death and burial ==
He died on 15 August 1587 aged 72 years and 6 days, as is stated on his monument erected by his son the antiquary in the Pole Chapel, Colyton Church, where he was buried.

== Sources ==
- Bridie, Marion F., The Story of Shute, Axminster, 1955
- Miller, Helen & Hasler, P. W., biography of William Pole (1515-1587), published in History of Parliament: House of Commons 1558-1603, 1981
