= William Pole (antiquary) =

English historian (1561–1635)

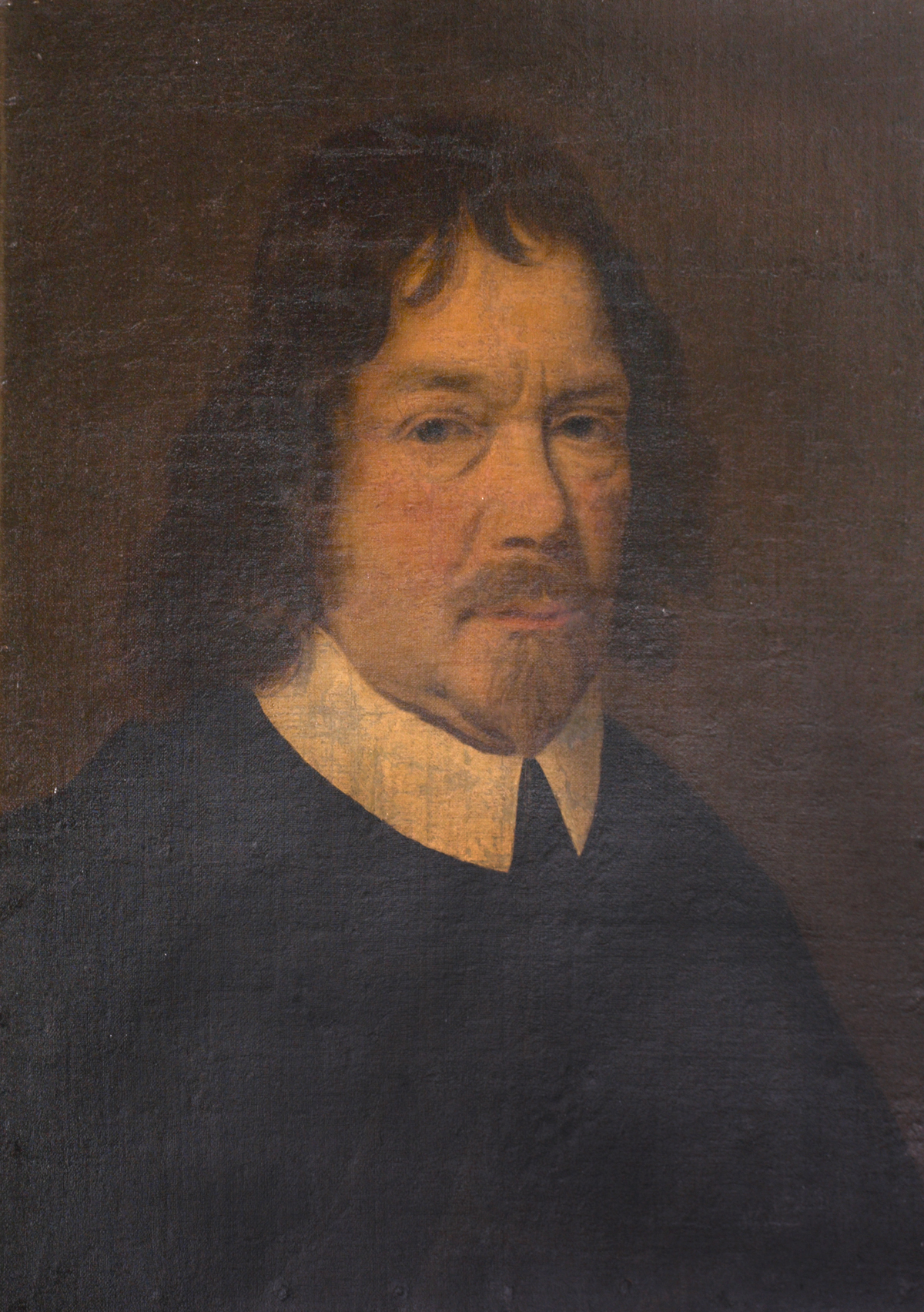
Portrait of Pole painted in the manner of Van Dyck. (Note: National Trust, collection of Antony House, Cornwall, ref. 352390. Formerly hung at Shute House, Devon. In manner of Van Dyck, possibly painted during his visit to England 1620–21 but is not included in Bryan's "Dictionary of Painters", the comprehensive list of Van Dyck's British sitters)

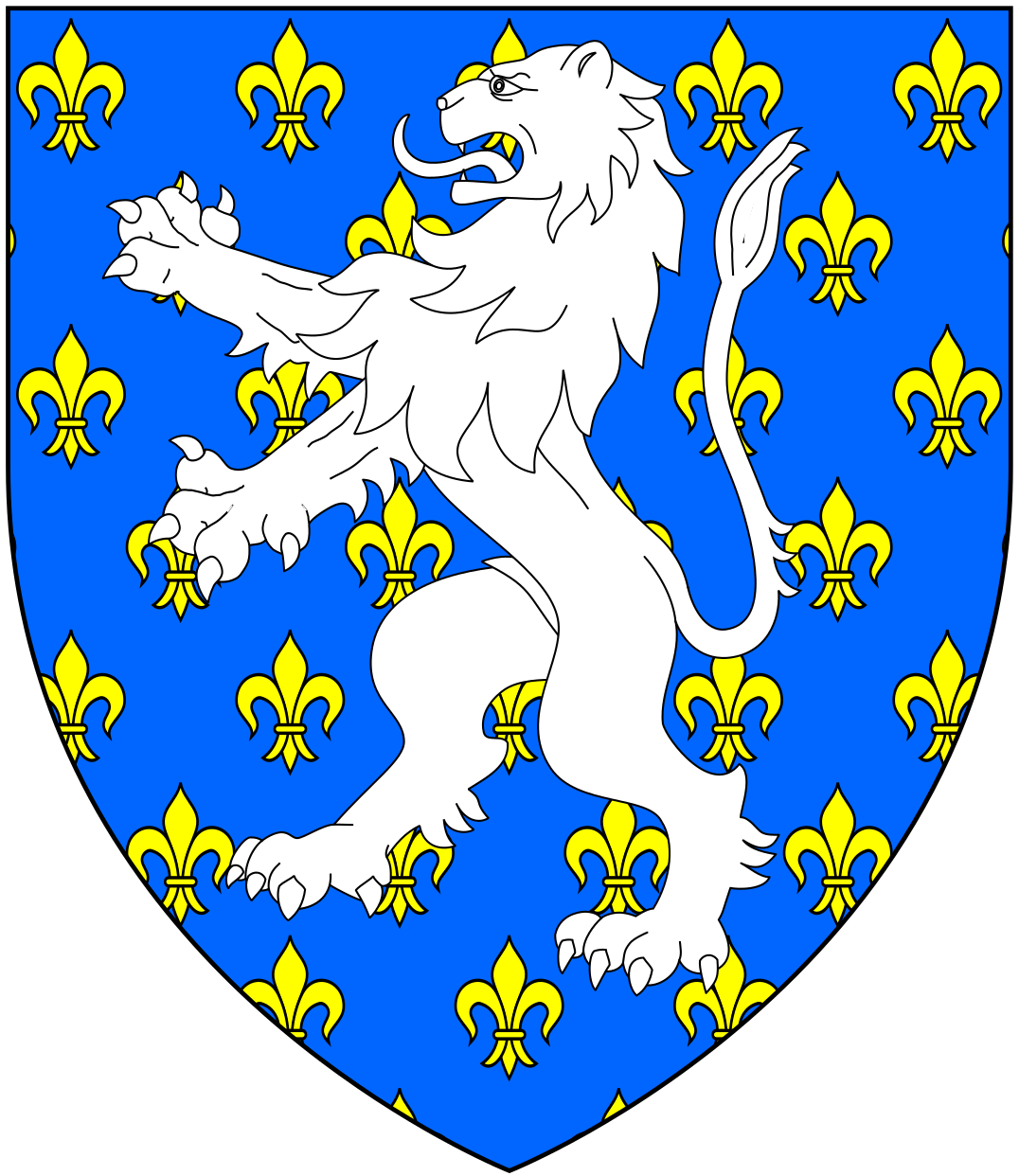
Arms of Pole of Shute: Azure semée of fleur-de-lys or, a lion rampant argent

Sir William Pole (1561–1635) of Colcombe House in the parish of Colyton, and formerly of Shute House in the parish of Shute (adjoining Colcombe), both in Devon, was an English country gentleman and landowner, a colonial investor, Member of Parliament and, most notably, a historian and antiquarian of the County of Devon.

== Career ==
Pole was baptised on 27 August 1561 at Colyton, Devon, the son of William Pole, Esquire (c.1514 – 1587), MP, by his wife Katherine Popham (died 1588), daughter of Alexander Popham of Huntworth, Somerset by his wife Joan Stradling. Katherine was the sister of John Popham (1531–1607), Lord Chief Justice. In 1560 his father had purchased Shute House, near Colyton and Axminster, Devon.

He entered the Inner Temple in 1578, was placed on the Commission of the Peace for Devonshire, served as Sheriff of Devon in 1602–3, and was MP in 1586 for Bossiney, Cornwall. He was knighted by King James I at Whitehall Palace on 15 February 1606. He paid into the Virginia Company, and was an incorporator of the third Virginia charter.

== Antiquarian works ==
During his life Pole wrote many unpublished manuscripts containing his researches into the history and antiquities of Devon and the descents of that county's ancient families, their landholdings and heraldry. These documents laid the foundation not only for future historians of the county but also for his contemporaries, such as Tristram Risdon (died 1640) who acknowledged the help he had received from Pole's compilations. Pole stated that he used as his sources "Records out of ye Towre, the Exchecquer & such deedes & evidences which in my searches I have founde". The Tower of London was one of the main repositories of legal and governmental deeds and other historical documents, until the opening of the Public Record Office in 1838. His work was enlarged by his son Sir John Pole, 1st Baronet, "who was much addicted also to this ingenuous study". However some, maybe many, of his manuscripts were destroyed at Colcombe Castle during the Civil War.

The documents that survived include:

- Two folio volumes, which were published in 1791 by his descendant Sir John de la Pole, 6th Baronet (1757–1799), of Shute, MP, under the title Collections Towards a Description of the County of Devon. In his introduction to the published volume, the 6th Baronet apologises to the reader for any of his spelling errors in transcribing the handwriting from the manuscripts and states that many of the resulting ambiguities "must still be left to the decision of the more informed reader".
- A folio volume of deeds, charters, and grants compiled in 1616, a small portion of which was printed privately by Sir Thomas Phillipps under the title "Sir William Pole's Copies of Extracts from Old Evidences", Mill Hill, c.1840.
- A thin folio volume containing heraldry, etc.
- A volume of deeds and grants to Tor Abbey

Pole's collections were used as source material for their own historical writings by among others, Tristram Risdon (d.1640), John Prince (d.1723) (Worthies of Devon), and the brothers Daniel Lysons (1762–1834) and Samuel Lysons (1763–1819), in volume 6: Devon (1822) of their Magna Britannia.

=== Assessment ===
His contemporary and fellow researcher into the history of Devonshire Tristram Risdon (d.1640), wrote as follows of Pole:

He was the most accomplished treasurer of the antiquities of this county [...] Such a gift had he of rare memory, that he would have recited upon a sudden the descents of most eminent families; from whose lamp I have received light in these my labours.

Today, Pole's collections are considered to be valuable records of otherwise lost documents, though as Youings wrote in 1996: "being a man of his time, the material was largely concerned with the genealogy and landed possessions of Devon's aristocracy and gentry, and he found no place for the rest of society".

== Marriages and children ==
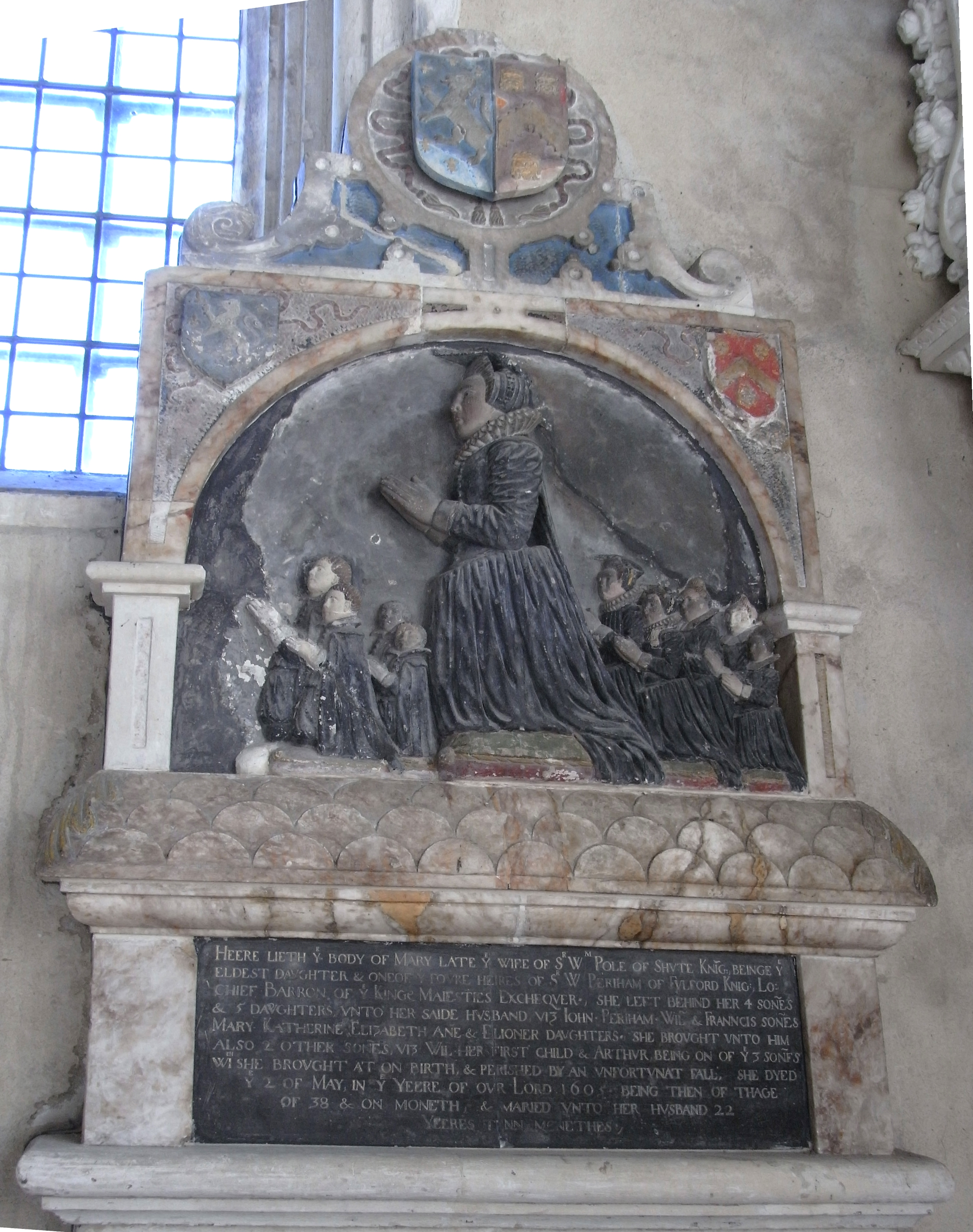
Monument to Pole's first wife, Mary Periham, in the Pole Chapel, Colyton Church, Devon

Pole married twice. His first marriage was to Mary Peryam (1567–1605), (Note: Mary Peryam's monument survives in the Pole Chapel in Colyton Church.) one of the four daughters and co-heiresses of Sir William Peryam (1534–1604), of Fulford House, Shobrooke, Devon, a judge and Lord Chief Baron of the Exchequer. By Mary Peryam he had six sons and six daughters including:

- William Pole (d.1586), eldest son, who predeceased his father, as is stated on the mural monument to his mother in the Pole Chapel in Colyton Church.
- Sir John Pole, 1st Baronet (c.1589–1658), eldest surviving son and heir.
- Peryam Pole, 2nd eldest surviving son, who founded the Irish branch of the family and whose descendant William Pole (died 1771), of Ballyfin, died without issue and bequeathed his estates to his wife's great-nephew William Wesley (1763–1845), who thereupon adopted the surname Wesley-Pole (Anglicised later to Wellesley-Pole) and became later 3rd Earl of Mornington, and was an elder brother of the 1st Duke of Wellington
- William Pole (1593–1674), triplet, baptised 4 December 1593 at Shute. matriculated at Oriel College, Oxford on 24 March 1610, graduated B.A. on 3 November 1612, entered the Inner Temple in 1616, and emigrated to America, where he died on 24 February 1674.
- Arthur Pole, triplet, baptised 4 December 1593 at Shute. "Perished by an unfortunat fall", as is stated on the mural monument to his mother in the Pole Chapel in Colyton Church.
- Francis Pole, triplet, baptised 4 December 1593 at Shute.
- Mary Pole (born 1586), eldest daughter, who married twice: firstly in 1602 to Nicholas Hurst of Oxton, Kenton and of Whiteway, Kingsteignton; secondly in 1606 (as his first wife) to Francis Courtenay, de jure 4th Earl of Devon (c. 1576 – 1638), MP, of Powderham Castle, Devon.
- Katherine Pole (born 1587), 2nd daughter, wife of Thomas Southcote of Mohuns Ottery in the parish of Luppitt and of Indio in the parish of Bovey Tracey, both in Devon.
- Elizabeth Pole (1588–1654), 3rd daughter, like her brother William Pole emigrated to America, and played a prominent role in the foundation and incorporation of Taunton, Massachusetts in 1639–40, where she died on 21 May 1654
- Ann Pole (born 1589), 4th daughter, married in 1611/12 to Edmond Walrond, of Bovey House, Beer, Devon.
- Eleanor Pole (born 1597), 5th daughter, wife of Anthony Floyer of Floyer Hayes in the parish of St Thomas, Exeter.

His second marriage was to Jane Simmes (died 1653), daughter of William Simmes (or Symes) of Chard, Somerset, and widow of Roger How, merchant of London. The marriage was childless.

== Death and burial ==
Pole died on 9 February 1635, aged 73, at his home Colcombe Castle, in the parish of Colyton, to which he had retired leaving Shute for the occupation of his son John. He was buried in the west side of the chancel in Colyton church, in the floor of which exists a simple ledger stone, with an inscription now much worn.

== Sources ==
- Pole, Sir William, Collections Towards a Description of the County of Devon, Sir John-William de la Pole (ed.), London, 1791.
- This article incorporates text from a publication now in the public domain: "Pole, William (1561-1635)". Dictionary of National Biography. London: Smith, Elder & Co. 1885–1900.
