= Shute, Devon =

Village in Devon, England

Coordinates: 50.7712°N 3.0602°W

Shute
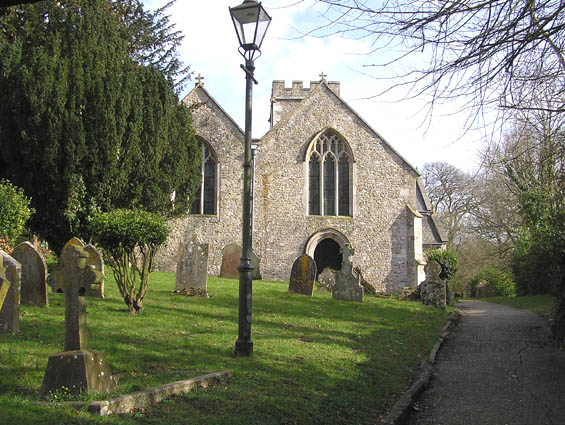
- St Michael's church

- Location within Devon
- Population: 589 (2001 UK Census)
- OS grid reference: SY252974
- District: East Devon
- Shire county: Devon
- Region: South West
- Country: England
- Sovereign state: United Kingdom
- Post town: AXMINSTER
- Postcode district: EX13
- Dialling code: 01297
- UK Parliament: Honiton and Sidmouth

Shute is a village, parish and former manor located 3 miles (5 km) west of Axminster in East Devon, off the A35 road.

It is surrounded by farmland and woodland beneath 163-metre (535 ft) Shute Hill. St Michael's Church dates from the 13th Century and contains many monuments to the Pole family, including a marble statue of Sir William Pole, 4th Baronet (1678–1741), Master of the Household to Queen Anne. A later 19th. century member of the family, Margaret Pole, is commemorated by an alabaster sculptured panel depicting her greeting her daughters at the gates of heaven. There exist within the parish the two former Pole family manor houses of Old Shute House (or Shute Barton), a historic mediaeval house, now owned by the National Trust, and the Georgian New Shute House, privately owned.

In 1981 the vicar of St Michael's and his wife founded the Shute Theatre and Arts Guild (STAG). The church was slightly altered to accommodate a permanent stage and extra power was bought in for stage lighting. STAG perform regular productions in the church and in nearby Kilmington Village Hall to this day.

The village was the scene of the murder of 84-year-old Ivy Batten in 1987.

The immediate village of Shute, with around only 150 residents, as opposed to the wider parish with a population of over 600, claims to be the smallest village in England to host a literary festival. Shute Festival was established in 2014, as an annual event, but was moved online with regular events following the 2020 pandemic lockdown. Previous guests have included the authors Phillipe Sands, Sophie Hannah, Tracy Chevalier, Christina Lamb, and Sir Anthony Selden.

The West of England Main Line passes through Seaton Junction to the south of the village.
