= Stirling baronets of Mansfield (1792) =

Escutcheon of the Stirling baronets of Mansfield

The Stirling baronetcy of Mansfield, Ayrshire was created on 19 July 1792 in the Baronetage of Great Britain for the Edinburgh banker James Stirling, Lord Provost of Edinburgh in 1790–1791. He was a government supporter at the time of the 1792 Dundas Riots.

The title became extinct on the death in 1843 of the 2nd Baronet.

== Stirling baronets, of Mansfield (1792) ==
- Sir James Stirling, 1st Baronet (c. 1740–1805)
- Sir Gilbert Stirling, 2nd Baronet (c. 1779–1843), died unmarried.

== Notes ==
Baronetage of Great Britain
Preceded by King baronets	Stirling baronets of Mansfield; 19 July 1792	Succeeded by Shore baronets
