= Brograve baronets of Worstead (1791) =

Escutcheon of the Brograve baronets of Worstead

The Brograve baronetcy, of Worstead House in the County of Norfolk, was created in the Baronetage of Great Britain on 28 July 1791 for Berney Brograve. The title became extinct upon the death of the 2nd Baronet in 1828.

== Brograve baronets, of Worstead (1791) ==
- Sir Berney Brograve, 1st Baronet (1726–1797)
- Sir George Berney Brograve, 2nd Baronet (1772–1828)

== Notes ==
Baronetage of Great Britain
Preceded by Chad baronets	Brograve baronets of Worstead; 28 July 1791	Succeeded by King baronets
