= George Duckworth (disambiguation) =

George Duckworth (1901–1966) was a cricketer.

George Duckworth may also refer to:

- George Arthur Duckworth (1901–1986), British Conservative politician
- George Eckel Duckworth (1903–1972), American classical scholar
- George Herbert Duckworth (1868–1934), English public servant
- Sir George Henry James Duckworth-King, 6th Baronet (1891–1952), of the Duckworth-King baronets
