= Thomas Parlby =

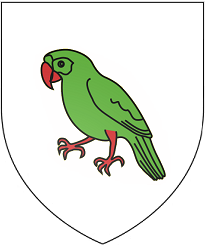
Arms of Thomas Parlby: Argent, a parrot vert. These arms are not recognised by the College of Arms in London, but were nevertheless used by his family, as visible on a marble chimneypiece circa 1780 in Stover House, Devon, the home of his sister Mary Parlby.

Thomas Parlby (1727–1802) Stone Hall, Stonehouse, in Plymouth "the big house overlooking Stonehouse Pool" (since demolished), was a civil engineering contractor described in his obituary in the Gentleman's Magazine as "Master Mason of HM Docks".

== Origins ==
Parlby was born in 1727 of humble origin, the youngest son of John Parlby (died 1766) of Gravesend, or Chatham, in Kent, by his wife Anne. His father was a ship's carpenter as were his two brothers, who also served as warrant officers in the Royal Navy. In 1745 his sister Mary Parlby married James Templer (1722–1782) at Greenwich and moved to Rotherhithe.

== Career ==
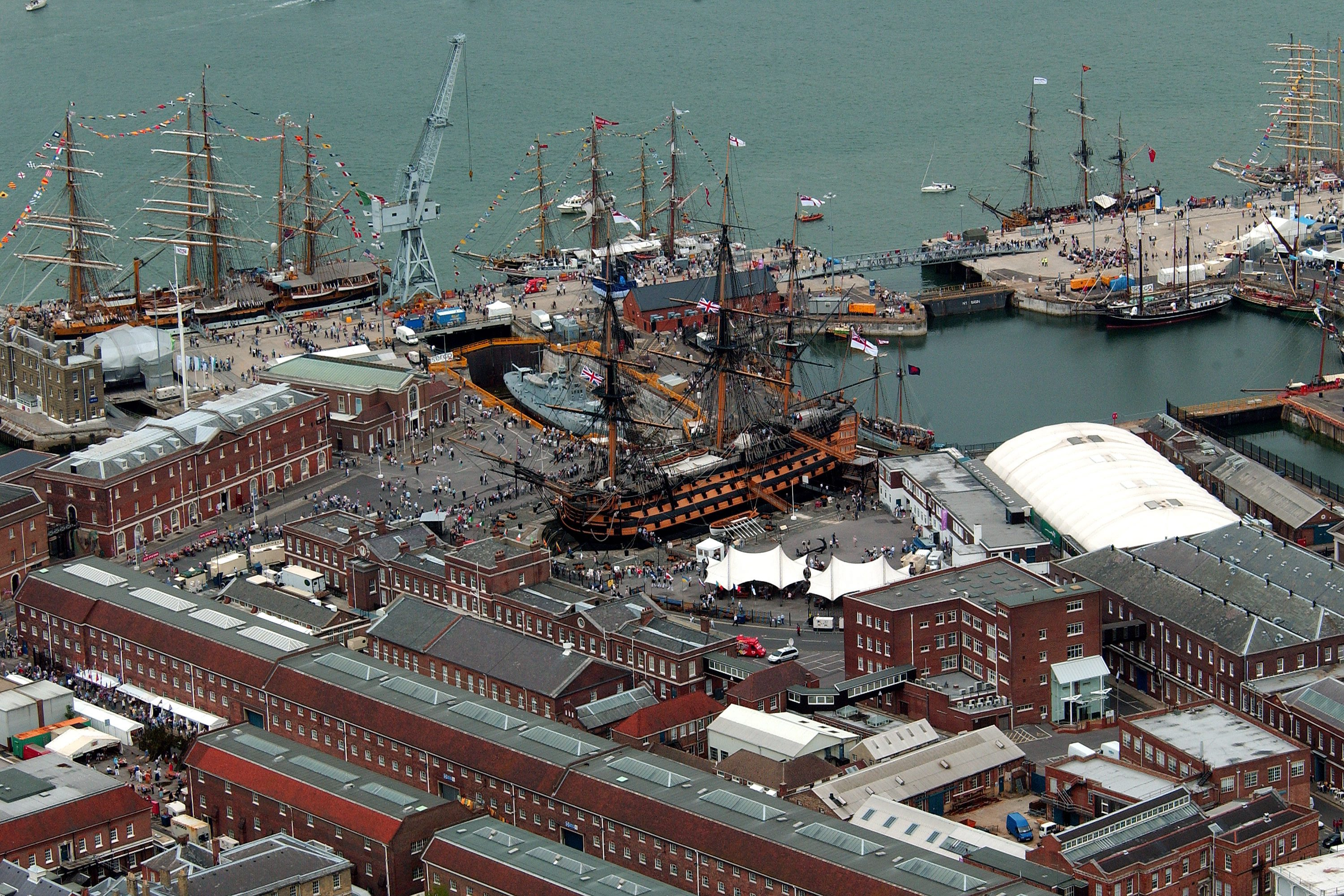
Historic Portsmouth Dockyard, Number 1 Basin and the dry dock group, which today house HMS Victory (centre, no.2 dock) and the Mary Rose (right, no.3 dock, under white cover), "which complex is widely regarded as the finest example of a dock group of its age".

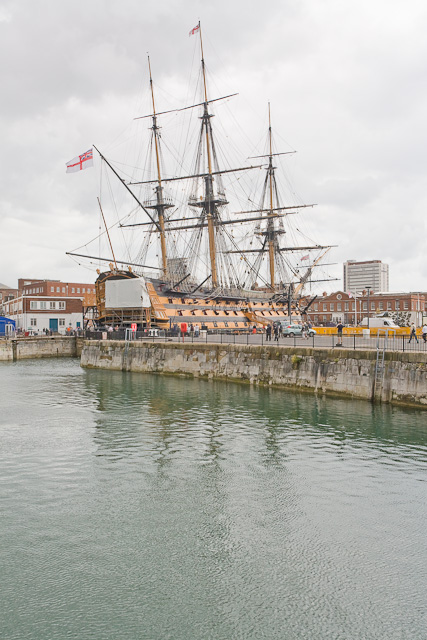
HMS Victory seen across Basin Number 1, Historic Portsmouth Dockyard

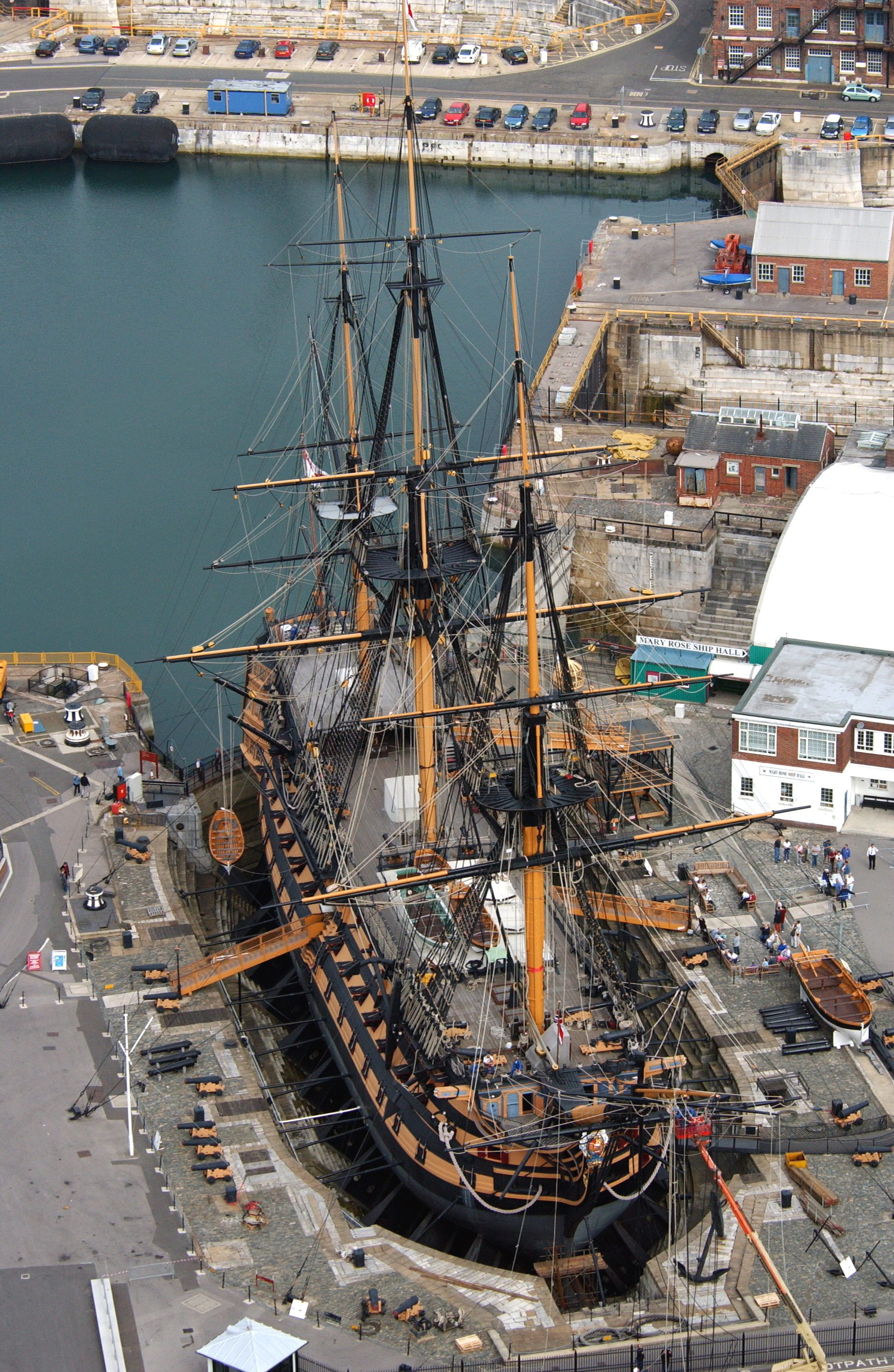
Number 1 Basin and the dry dock group with HMS Victory

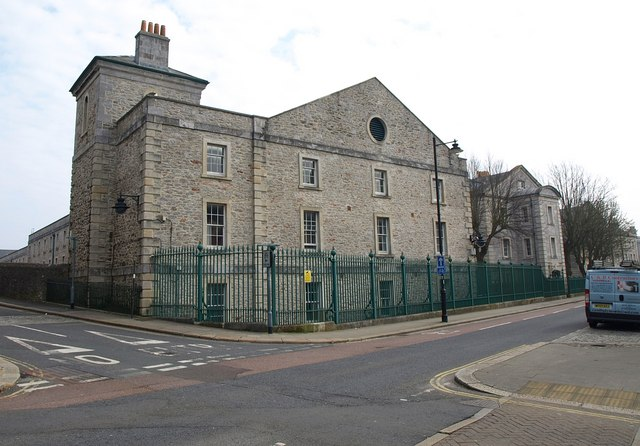
Royal Marine Barracks, Stonehouse

Parlby and his brother-in-law James Templer operated as a partnership known as "Templer & Parlby"; they were civil engineering contractors and contractors to the Navy Board. They were working at a time of major expansion in the royal dockyards of Great Britain due to the frequent wars with Spain and France which occurred between 1739 and 1815. Templer died unexpectedly in 1782, when Parlby took over the business. Amongst their works were:

- Plymouth Dockyard. They won the government contract to rebuild Plymouth Dockyard in 1763, and nearly doubled it in size by levelling the hill to the south and replacing all the buildings except the officers' accommodation. One of these docks is still known as the "Parlby Dock", after the "Great Parlby Dock", "the biggest anywhere yet then constructed, capable of accommodating the largest first rate of any navy".
- Royal Naval Hospital, Stonehouse, Plymouth (1758) The hospital housed 1200 patients in sixty wards, its ten ward blocks being arranged around a courtyard with a central block containing the chapel, dispensary and staff housing. The hospital closed in 1995 and is now a gated residential complex called Millfields.
- Royal Marine Barracks, Stonehouse. The same partnership also built between 1779 and 1785 in the classical style the Royal Marine Barracks on Durnford Street, Stonehouse, Plymouth, which still survive on three sides of a courtyard now closed by 19th-century additions, described by Copper Plate Magazine as " a fine pile of buildings".
- Portsmouth Dockyard, Number 1 Basin and the dry dock group, which today house HMS Victory and the Mary Rose, "which complex is widely regarded as the finest example of a dock group of its age".
- St Ann's Church, Her Majesty's Naval Base Portsmouth (1786), the spiritual home of the Royal Navy which contains numerous memorials to men lost at sea.

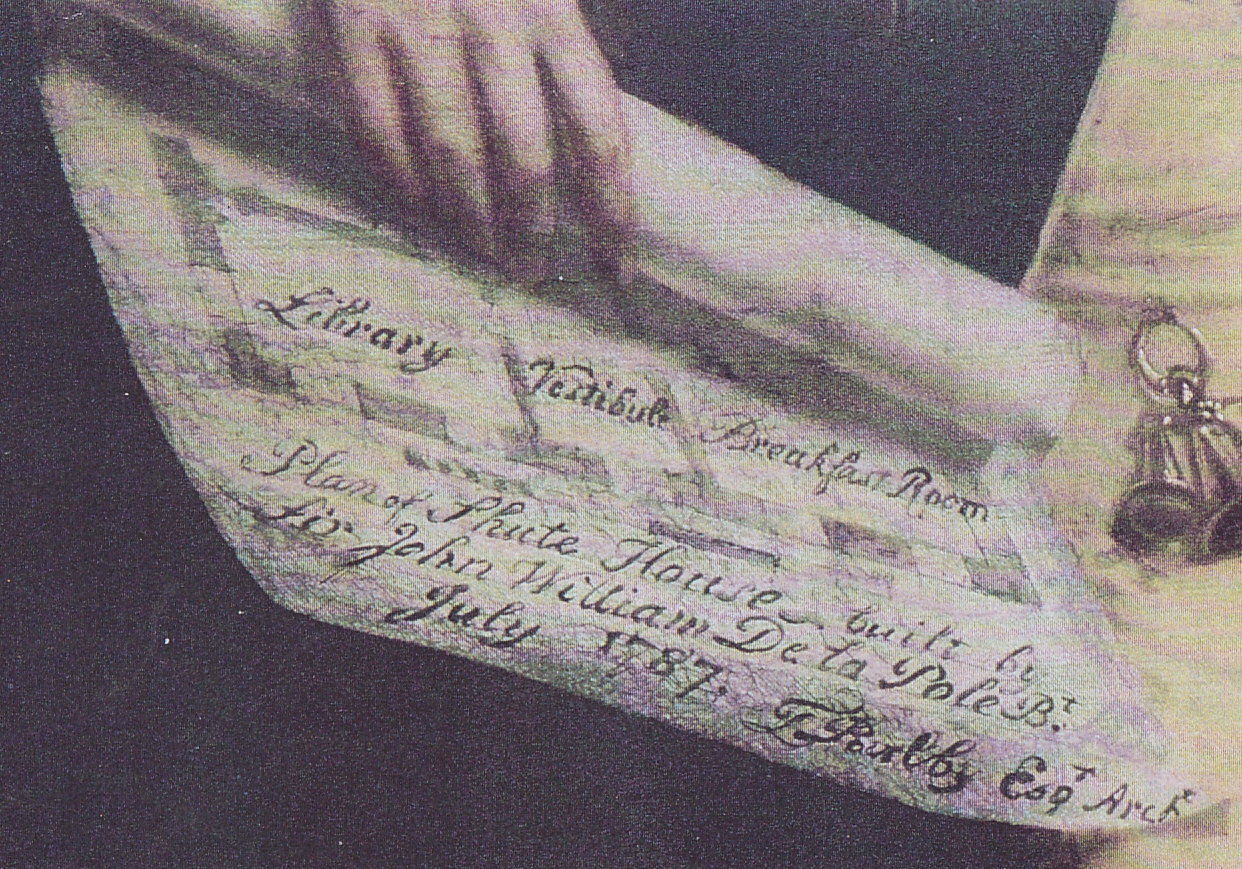
Detail from portrait by Thomas Beach of Sir John de la Pole, 6th Baronet, showing writing on the scroll held in his right hand: "Plan of Shute House built by Sir John William De la Pole Bt. July 1787, T. Parlby Esqr. Archt."

- New Shute House, Devon, a country house designed and built by Thomas Parlby for James Templer's daughter Anne and her husband Sir John de la Pole, 6th Baronet. The identity of the architect as Thomas Parlby, the uncle of Lady Anne Pole and business partner of her father James I Templer, was apparently first discovered by Maureen Turner in her 1999 MA dissertation at Exeter University. The identity had eluded both Bridie, the principal author on the house and also Pevsner and Cherry (2004), the writers on architectural history, who wrote: "One would like to know the architect of this handsome late Palladian composition of 1787". Whilst at Antony House in Cornwall researching the Pole family, Turner inspected closely the portrait of Sir John Pole the builder, more especially the roll of paper held in his right hand, and discovered drawn thereon a partial plan of the new house with the following words written beneath: "Plan of Shute House built by Sir John William De la Pole Bt. July 1787, T. Parlby Esqr. Archt."
- Stonehouse Chapel, Plymouth (1787)
- Kitchens, Saltram House. Parlby also in a smaller commission rebuilt the kitchens at Saltram House after the fire of 1778, "a fine lofty room with a coved ceiling".
- Bath House, Antony House, Cornwall (1788–90), for the Pole family.
- Durnford Street, Plymouth, speculative residences.

== Marriage and children ==
In 1748 Parlby married Lydia Martyn and settled in Deptford, later moving to Plymouth. Their children included:

- Priscilla Parlby, who in 1800 married Admiral Sir Charles Ekins GCB (1768–1855), Royal Navy.
- Lt.Col. James Templer Parlby (d.1826)
- John Alexander Parlby (d.1849), JP, who married in 1792 Laetitia Hall (d.1848).

== Death and burial ==
He rebuilt the old chapel at Stonehouse in 1787 and his 1802 monument, by Peter Rouw of London (who also made the monuments to Sir John Pole and his wife Lady Anne in Shute Church), was situated in the new church.

== Bibliography ==
- Drabble, S. (2010). "Templer & Parlby: Eighteenth century contractor". Proceedings of the Institution of Civil Engineers - Engineering History and Heritage. 163 (3): 189–198. doi:10.1680/ehah.2010.163.3.189.
- Pevsner, Nikolaus; Cherry, Bridget (2004). The Buildings of England: Devon. London.
