= Brograve =

Brograve is a surname. Notable people with the surname include:

- John Brograve (1538–1613), English lawyer and politician
- Brograve baronets
