= Baron Teignmouth =

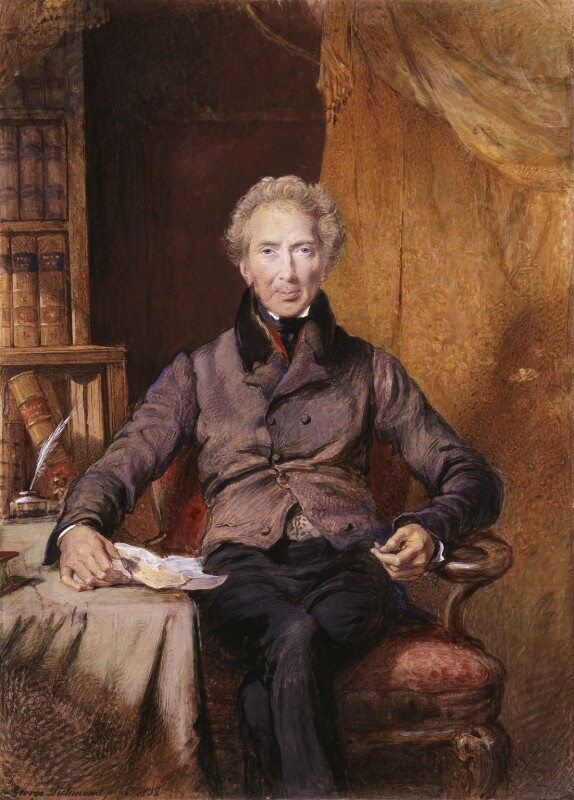
John Shore, 1st Baron Teignmouth.

Baron Teignmouth, of Teignmouth, was a title in the Peerage of Ireland. It was created in 1798 for Sir John Shore, 1st Baronet, previously Governor-General of India. He had already been created a Baronet, of Heathcote, in the County of Derby, in the Baronetage of Great Britain in 1792. The titles became extinct in 1981 on the death of the seventh Baron.

== Shore baronets, of Heathcote (1792) ==
- Sir John Shore, 1st. Baronet (1751–1834) (created Baron Teignmouth in 1798)

== Barons Teignmouth (1798) ==
- John Shore, 1st Baron Teignmouth (1751–1834)
- Charles John Shore, 2nd Baron Teignmouth (1796–1885)
- Charles John Shore, 3rd Baron Teignmouth (1840–1915)
- Frederick Shore, 4th Baron Teignmouth (1844–1916)
- Henry Shore, 5th Baron Teignmouth (1847–1926)
- Hugh Aglionby Shore, 6th Baron Teignmouth (1881–1964)
- Frederick Shore, 7th Baron Teignmouth (1920–1981)

Coat of arms of Baron Teignmouth
Crest A stork regardant with a stone in its dexter claw Proper. Escutcheon Argent a chevron Sable between three holly leaves Vert. Supporters Two storks regardant Proper. Motto Perimus Licitis (We Die in a Good Cause)

Baronetage of Great Britain
Preceded by Stirling baronets	Shore baronets of Heathcote; 27 October 1792	Succeeded by Gould baronets
