= Sir William Pole, 7th Baronet =

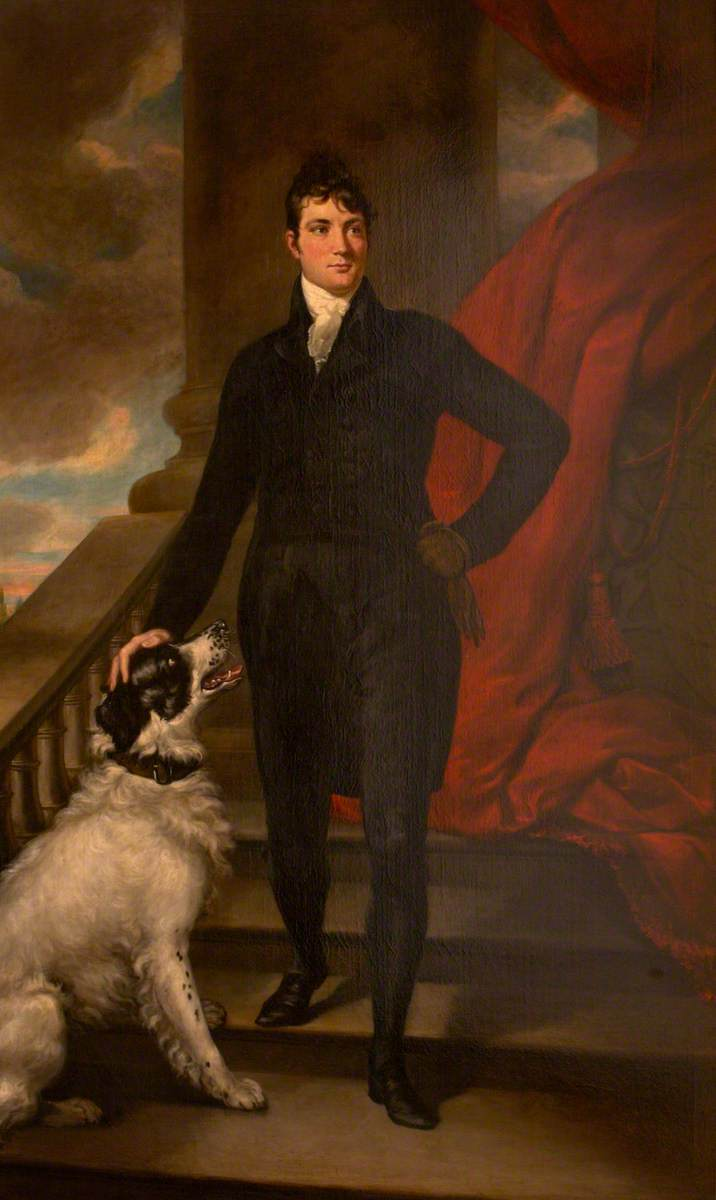
Portrait of Sir William, by James Northcote, 1808.

Sir William Templer Pole, 7th Baronet DCL (2 August 1782 – 1 April 1847) was an English landowner and baronet.

== Early life ==
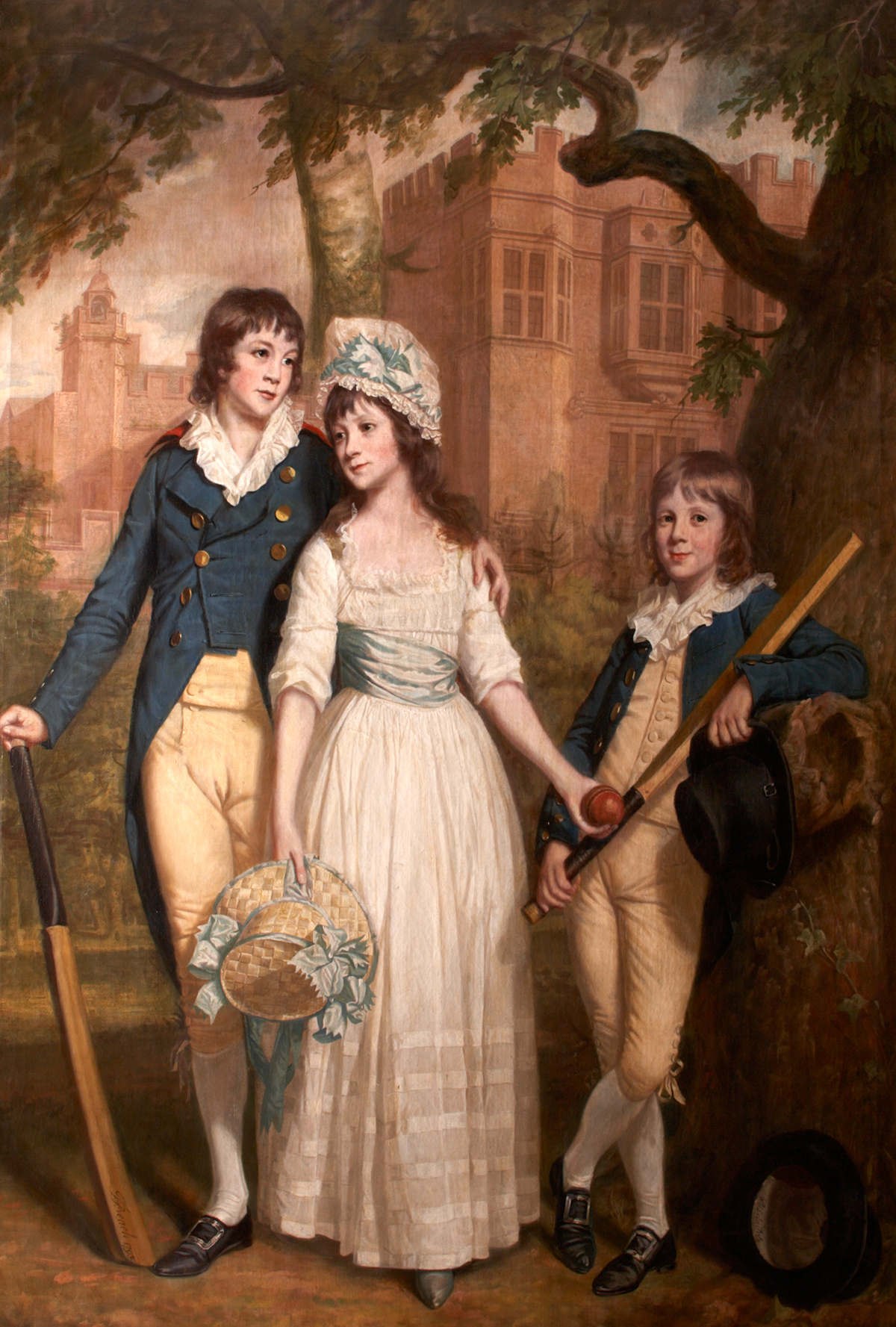
Portrait by Thomas Beach with Old Shute House as background of William and two of his siblings (l to r): William, Mary-Anne and John George. Collection at Antony House, Cornwall

Pole was born on 2 August 1782. He was the son of Sir John de la Pole, 6th Baronet and Anne Templer (a daughter of James Templer of Stover House). His younger siblings were Mary Anne de la Pole and John George de la Pole.

His paternal grandparents were Sir John Pole, 5th Baronet and, his first wife, Elizabeth Mills (daughter and co-heiress of John Mills, a banker and planter of St. Kitts, West Indies and Woodford, Essex).

After attending Eton College, he matriculated at Christ Church, Oxford on 24 April 1801, aged 18. He earned an Master of Arts on 13 June 1804 and a Doctor of Civil Law on 5 July 1810.

== Career ==
On the death of his father on 30 November 1799, he succeeded as the 7th Baronet Pole, of Shute House, Devonshire, which had been created in the Baronetage of England in 1628. He was a student of Lincoln's Inn in 1803.

He was the High Sheriff of Devon from 1818 to 1819.

== Personal life ==
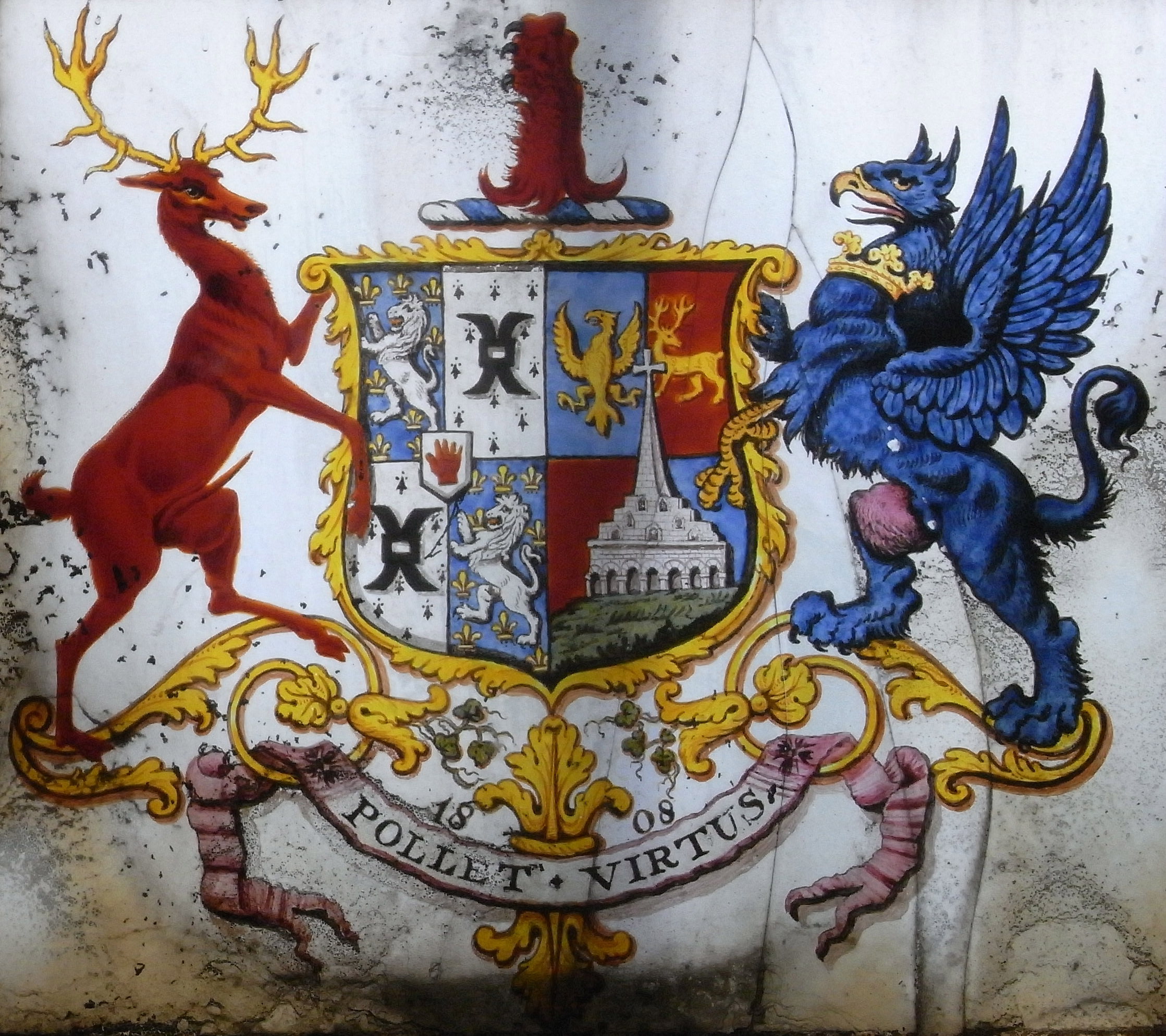
1808 commemorative stained glass window in Shute Church, Devon, showing arms of the 7th Baronet, impaling the arms of Templer, the family of his first cousin and first wife Sophia-Anne Templer (1788–1808), following whose death the window was made.

On 24 August 1804, Sir William married his first cousin, Sophia Anne Templer, a daughter of his maternal uncle, George Templer, MP for Honiton, and Jane Paul (a daughter of Henry Paul of West Monckton). Before her death, they were the parents of:

- Sir John George Reeve de la Pole, 8th Baronet (1808–1874), who married Margaretta Barton, daughter of Henry Barton of Sausthorpe Hall, in 1829. After her death, he married Josephine Catherine Denise Carré in 1843.

After her death, he married Charlotte Fraser (1787–1877), a daughter of John Fraser of Fonthill Abbey, Wiltshire, on 30 August 1810. Together, they were the parents of:

- Jane Maria Pole (d. 1837), who married, as his second wife, Edward Wyndham Harrington Schenley in 1833.
- Charlotte Pole (1813–1898), who died unmarried.
- Sir William Edmund Pole, 9th Baronet (1816–1895), who married Margaret Victoriosa Talbot, daughter of Adm. Sir Hon. John Talbot and Hon. Juliana Mary Arundel (a daughter of the 9th Baron Arundell), in 1841.
- Reginald Frederick Pole (1818–1848), who died unmarried at age 29.

Sir William died on 1 April 1847 at age 64. His widow lived another thirty years until her death on 2 October 1877.

Baronetage of England
Preceded by John William de la Pole	Baronet (of Shute House); 1799–1847	Succeeded by John George Reeve de la Pole
