= John Farquhar (gunpowder dealer) =

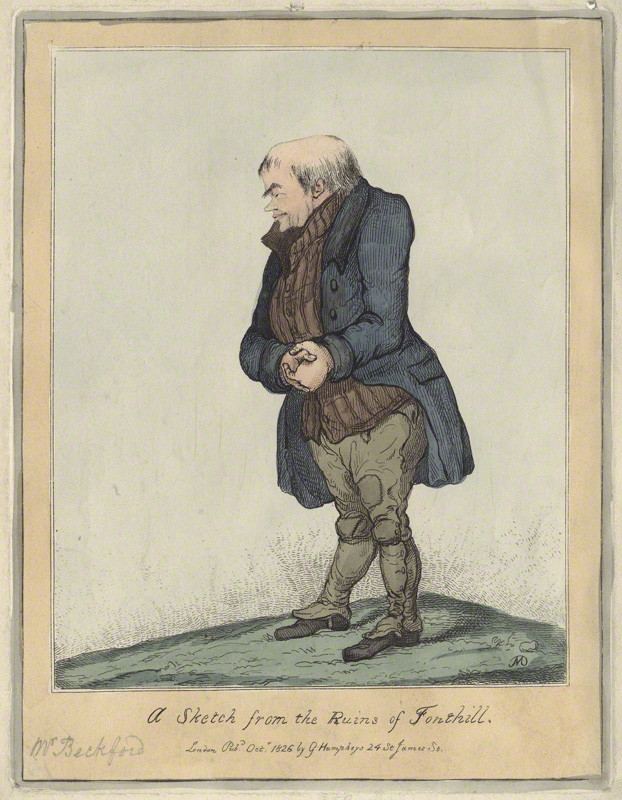
John Farquhar, 1826 engraving

John Farquhar (1751–1826) was a Scottish millionaire dealer in gunpowder.

== Early life ==
Farquhar was born of humble parents at Bilbo, in the parish of Crimond, Aberdeenshire. At 15 he had a bursary to attend Marischal College, Aberdeen, studied there for four years, and graduated M.A. He studied Greek, natural history, experimental and moral philosophy and mathematics. He went to London at nineteen, around 1770, and either signed up as a cadet in the East India Company army or took a place as an East Indiaman as surgeon's mate. He found work in a Bengal merchant's office in Barrackpore.

While he was trading in Bengal as a free merchant, he discovered that locally sourced saltpetre was shipped to London to be manufactured into gunpowder before being exported back to India for the company's use. Picking up experimental chemistry as a hobby, Farquhar found it a business asset. The Gunpowder was being manufactured at Pultah, a reach of the Hooghly River about two miles inland from Barrackpore had been found unsatisfactory, and Farquhar was chosen by General Cornwallis, governor-general of Bengal, to look into it. He was made superintendent of the factory, and ultimately became sole contractor to the government. He became wealthy, influential, and on good terms with Warren Hastings.

== In England ==
Farquhar returned to England in 1814, with a fortune of about £500,000. It was invested by Hoare's Bank in government funds.

Stories attached to Farquhar, who spent little on himself. Farquhar was taken for a beggar in the street and offered alms. On landing at Gravesend he is said to have walked to London in order to save coach hire, and arrived at his banker's so covered with dust and so poorly clad that the clerks allowed him to wait in the cash office until Mr. Hoare passed through, and recognised him. Farquhar took up residence in Upper Baker Street, Portman Square. His sole attendant was an old woman, and the house was conspicuous for its neglected appearance. His room, 'to which a brush or brown was never applied,' was dirty, ill-kept and strewn with books and papers. Though miserly in his personal habits, he was fond of attending auction sales, and bidding in them. Despite idiosyncrasies such as an untidy appearance and poor dining habits, his manners were affable and pleasant.

At the same time Farquhar was princely in charitable contributions. He became a partner in the agency house of Basset, Farquhar, & Co. in the city, and purchased a share in the Whitbread brewery. His wealth, as it accumulated, was devoted partly to the purchase of estates, but more was invested. In 1822 he purchased Fonthill Abbey from William Thomas Beckford for £330,000, and he occasionally resided there until the fall of the tower in December 1825, shortly after which he sold the estate.

Besides knowledge of chemistry, Farquhar was an accomplished classical scholar, and also excelled in mathematics and mechanics. His beliefs included admiration of the moral system of Hinduism. He wished to expend £100,000 for the foundation of a college in Aberdeen, with a reservation in regard to religion; but lacking parliamentary sanction the scheme was not carried out.

== Death and legacy ==
Farquhar died suddenly of apoplexy on 6 July 1826. His wealth amounted to about £1.5 million. He left no will, and it was divided among his seven nephews and nieces. He was buried in St John's Wood Church, London with a monument to him by Peter Rouw. Farquhar's library was sold at auction in London by Sotheby, on 1 March 1827 (and four following days); a copy of the catalogue is held at Cambridge University Library (shelfmark Munby.c.167[3]).
