= George Berney Brograve =

British Army officer

Sir George Berney Brograve, 2nd Baronet (4 February 1772 – 1 June 1828). Brograve was a baronet and landowner in Norfolk, an officer in the county militia and High Sheriff of the county. He lived at Worstead House near Worstead.

== Life and career ==
Sole survivor of eleven children from his father Sir Berney Brograve, 1st Baronet's second marriage, he succeeded to the title and his father's estates in 1797. He was trained as a lawyer. He was High Sheriff of Norfolk in 1802.

On 18 December 1802 he was commissioned as a Captain in the East Norfolk Militia. He was promoted to be the regiment's Major on 7 March 1804 and its Lieutenant-Colonel on 7 May 1805. He commanded the regiment during its deployment to the Sussex Coast during the invasion scare of 1805, but resigned his commission on 19 May 1806.

== Divorce ==
His nine-year marriage to Emma Louisa Whitwell was dissolved by an Act of Parliament on 28 April 1809. Captain Masham Elwin was put on trial for criminal conversation with Brograve's wife, before the Right Hon. Lord Ellenborough in the court of the King's Bench, Guildhall on 8 July 1807; with the intercepted letters.

Lady Brograve, who was described to the court as "a woman of fashion & consequence", stated she had never loved her husband, nor had she wanted the marriage, but it had been an arrangement made between her father and Brograve. Elwin was found guilty and ordered to pay damages to Brograve of two thousand pounds. Lady Brograve and Capt. Elwin were married three days after her divorce.

== Succession ==
Brograve had canceled his will immediately on discovering his wife's infidelity, and like his father before him, died intestate, the last in the direct male line of this ancient family. His heir at law was a distant relative, Henry John Conyers of Copped Hall, Essex. Worstead House and most of the other estates were put up for sale shortly after Brograve's death in 1828, although Conyers appears to have kept Waxham Hall for a time.

A younger brother, Roger Brograve, described as "of competent, if not splendid fortune" had inherited money and estates from their uncle Thomas Brograve, a lawyer of Springfield, Essex in 1811. Roger was a serious gambler, and in 1813 lost £10,000 at the Derby race at Newmarket. He then "found himself unable to answer his engagements" and shot himself two days later with a duelling pistol inserted in his mouth while sitting up in bed. The jury brought in a verdict of insanity.

Baronetage of Great Britain
Preceded by Berney Brograve	Baronet (of Worstead); 1797–1828	Extinct
