= Berney Brograve =

British baronet

Sir Berney Brograve, 1st Baronet (10 October 1726 - 23 February 1797) was the eldest son and heir of Thomas Brograve (1691–1753) of Great Baddow, Essex, and his wife Juliana Berney. He was a descendant of Sir John Brograve (d. 1613), Attorney-General to the Duchy of Lancaster. Juliana Berney was descended from Sir Richard Berney, 1st Baronet of Parkhall.

== Brograve Mill ==
In 1733 Thomas Brograve purchased the manors of Waxham and Horsey in Norfolk, and so began the "notorious" Brograve family of Waxham. Initially they lived at Waxham Hall, which had been built in the 16th Century by the Wodehouse family.

Berney and the Brograve Mill (which he built to drain the land at Brograve Level), where he is said to have hidden from the devil, and he is also reputed to have had a mowing match for his soul with the devil at Worstead.

== Family ==
In 1761 Brograve married Jane, eldest daughter of Edward Hawker of Great Baddow, Essex. They had four children, only two of whom survived, including Ann who married Dr John Rye, the founder of The Shipwrecked Fishermen and Mariners' Royal Benevolent Society. After his first wife's death Brograve married secondly, in 1769, Jane Halcott, sole heiress of Matthew Halcott of Litcham. Most of their eleven children died in infancy, and their son, George succeeded as 2nd Baronet in 1797. A granddaughter married Sir William Beauchamp-Proctor, 3rd Baronet, in whose family the name of Brograve descended as a given name.

== Worstead House ==
Worstead House, designed by James Wyatt for Sir Berney Brograve, was eventually demolished in 1937, "a fine red brick mansion, situated within a noble park of 400 acres, which contains a lake covering 8¼ acres". After building his mansion-house at Worstead he was described as occasionally inhabiting the manor house at Waxham. An account written in 1854 describes the manner in which Brograve lived at Waxham Hall: "He farmed his own land and had about a hundred workmen lodging in his house; these all dined in the great hall together, and Sir Berney every now and then 'knocked down' a bullock for them to live upon".

Berney was created a baronet on 28 July 1791 and died intestate in 1797. His second wife, Lady Jane, died in 1793 at Waxham, followed the next day by the death of their 18-year-old son, Thomas.

According to local legend, like his ancestors, Sir Berney is still around and can be seen on wild and stormy nights galloping between Worstead and Waxham.

Baronetage of Great Britain
New creation	Baronet (of Worstead); 1791–1797	Succeeded by George Berney Brograve
