= Peter Rouw =

British sculptor (1758–1832)

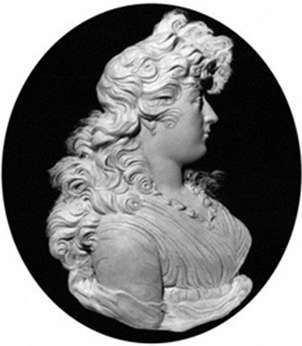
Wax portrait relief by Peter Rouw c.1795 of Charlotte Augusta Matilda, Princess Royal (National Portrait Gallery, London, NPG 2174)

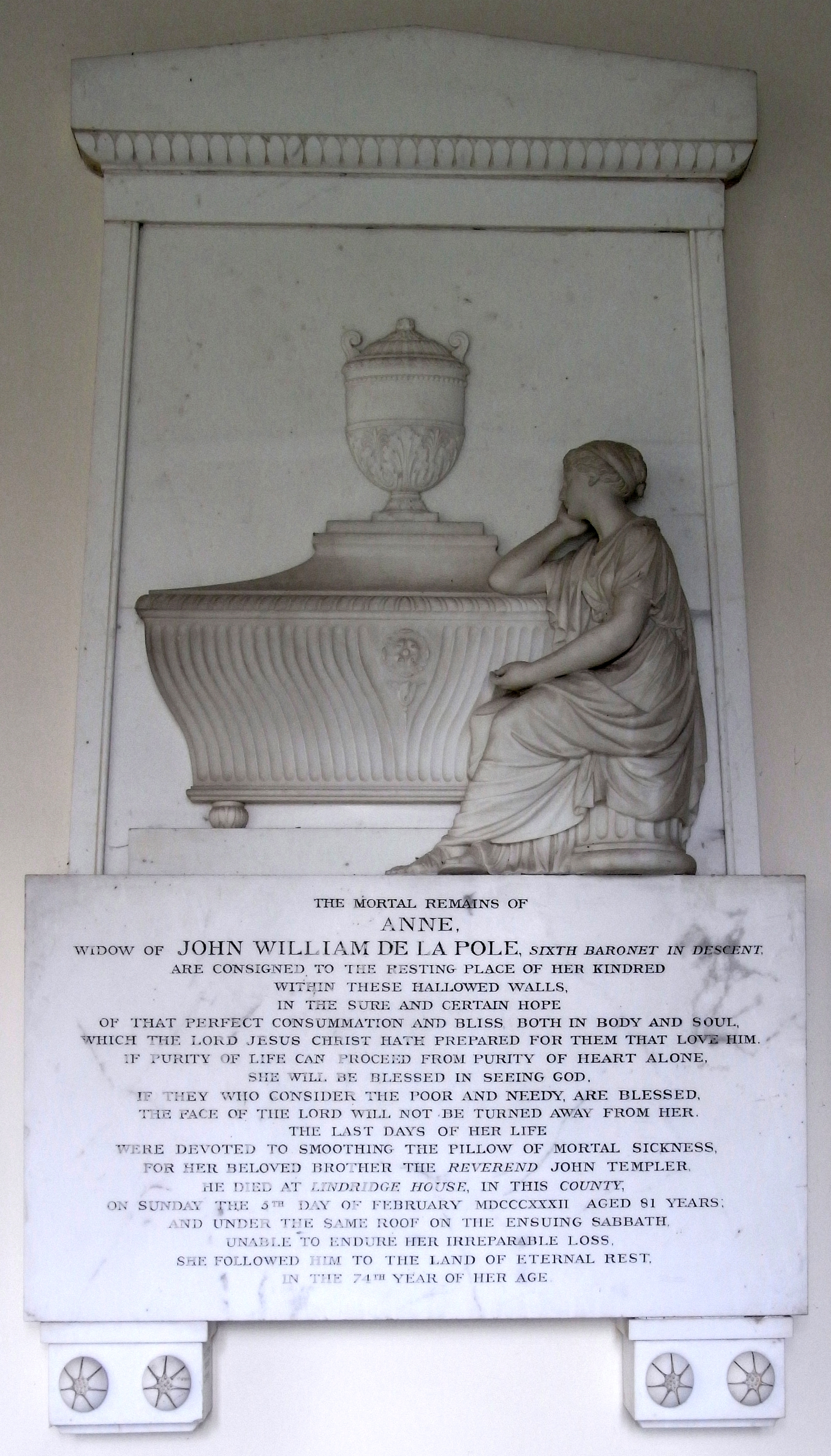
1832 mural monument by Peter Rouw to Lady Anne Pole (née Templer) (1758–1832), wife of Sir John de la Pole, 6th Baronet (1757–1799) signed: "P. Rouw sculp. London"; west wall of south transept of St Michael's Church, Shute, Devon

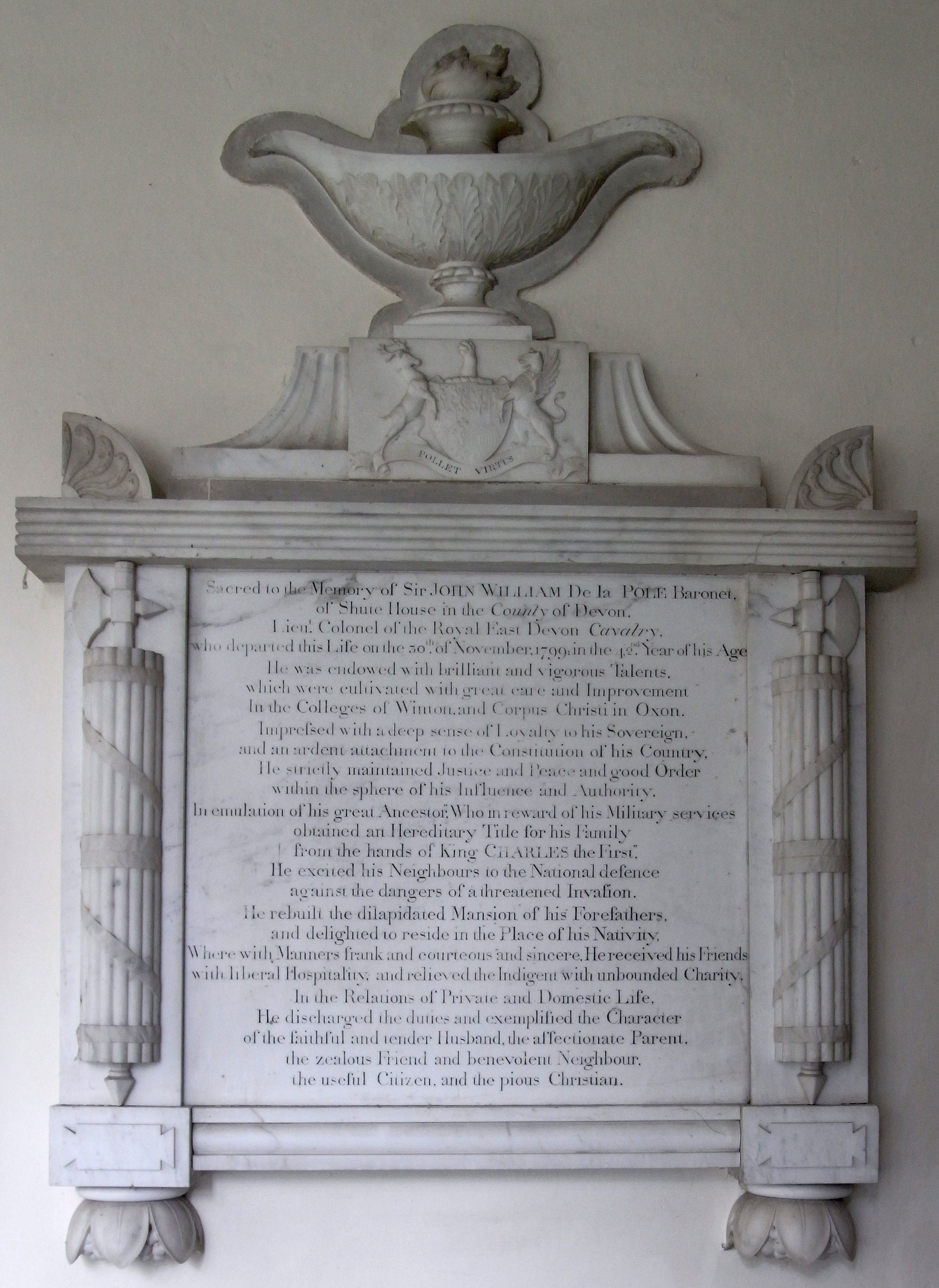
Mural monument by Peter Rouw to Sir John de la Pole, 6th Baronet (1757–1799), St Michael's Church, Shute, Devon, west wall of south transept

Peter Rouw II (17 April 1771– 9 December 1852) was a London-based sculptor specialising in bas-reliefs in marble, often in the form of mural church monuments, and in wax miniature portraits, often of a pink hue on black glass. He designed medals, including one of William Wilberforce, and also made a few marble busts. He exhibited at the Royal Academy of Arts. In 1807 Rouw was appointed modeller of cameos and gems to the Prince Regent.

== Background ==
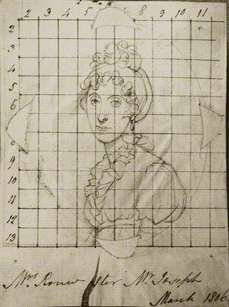
Anna Rouw, wife of Peter Rouw, pencil drawing squared in ink for transfer by Henry Bone, probably after George Francis Joseph, March 1806.( National Portrait Gallery, London, NPG D17307)

He was the son of the sculptor Hendrick Rouw and Elizabeth Clemmes, baptised 17 APR 1770 • Middlesex, England His uncle Peter Rouw also a sculptor (fl. 1787- 1793), apparently of Dutch origin. He entered the Royal Academy Schools in 1788 and exhibited there until 1838. He was a friend of the sculptor Joseph Nollekens. He had an address in Norton Street, Fitzroy Square. In 1840 he lost the sight of one eye and found it hard to work thereafter. He experienced financial problems from 1842. One of his students was Samuel Joseph (1791–1850), who is known for making the statue of William Wilberforce in Westminster Abbey.

He died in Pentonville on 9 December 1852. and is buried at Saint Mary's Islington, London, England.

=== Brother Henry Rouw ===
His brother Henry Rouw (c.1780–1855) was probably the 'H Rouw Junior' who exhibited paintings at the Royal Academy between 1796 and 1803. Pyke describes him as a wax modeller and painter but gives no examples of his works in wax. Rupert Gunnis felt that as a statuary Henry was not the equal of his brother. His best-known works are the monument to Jane Akers at Yalding, being a relief of an angel bearing a child heavenwards, and the monument to the Aubrey brothers in Paddington depicting the figure of Victory standing next to a sarcophagus with medallion portraits of the two officers. He was buried at All Souls, Kensal Green.

Brother - Theophilus Rouw (b.1774-1842) Middlesex England, was also a sculptor of the region. Also buried at Kensal Green Cemetery.

== Works ==
Of the works of Peter Rouw, seven of his wax portrait reliefs or medallions are held by the National Portrait Gallery in London, namely of Charlotte Augusta Matilda, Princess Royal (c.1795), James Watt (1802), Francis Egerton, 3rd Duke of Bridgewater (1803), Warren Hastings (1806) and William Pitt the Younger (1809). The Victoria & Albert Museum holds a medallion in pink wax on black glass made by him of Prince Lucien Bonaparte (1814), the Duke of Wellington (1822) and posthumously in 1814 of Matthew Boulton, the partner of James Watt. Rouw wrote as follows to M.R. Boulton, the subject's son: If any friend should wish to have a copy of your father's portrait the price will be fourteen guineas, as it has taken me more time than I expected it would when I gave you the amount. An enclosed invoice referred to "a portrait of the late M. Boulton 25 gns., a copy of the same 10 gns". Graham Pollard deduced: "As 10 guineas was Rouw's standard price, the sum of 25 guineas must refer to the large-scale wax. The example in the Victoria and Albert Museum is signed and dated 1814. It is therefore one of the copies mentioned by Rouw, priced at fourteen guineas".

== Chronological List of Works ==
- Medallion of Charlotte Augusta Matilda, Princess Royal, National Portrait Gallery (c.1795),
- Monument to Sir John de la Pole, 6th Baronet at Shute, Devon (1799)
- Monument to Maximilian Western at Standlake Church, Oxon (1801)
- Monument to Henry Stevens at Little Torrington, Devon (1802)
- Medallion of James Watt, National Portrait Gallery (1802)
- Medallion of Francis Egerton, 3rd Duke of Bridgewater, National Portrait Gallery (1803)
- Monument to Francis Rogers in Birmingham St Philip's Church, (1804)
- Monument to Moses Haughton the elder in Birmingham, St Philip's Church, (1804)
- Monument to Robert Coales in St Martin's Church Birmingham (1804)
- Monument to David Scott (of Dunninald), M.P., Chairman of the East India Company, in Craig Parish Church, Angus (c.1805 – c.1806)
- Monument to G Arnold in Niton Church, Isle of Wight (1806)
- Monument to Duchess Helene Pawlowna of Mecklenburg-Schwerin at Mausoleum in Palace Garden Ludwigslust (1806)
- Medallion of Warren Hastings, National Portrait Gallery (1806)
- Appointed "sculptor-modeller of gems" to the Prince Regent (1807)
- Monument to Lady de la Pole, at Shute, Devon (1808)
- Medallion of Charles James Fox at Victoria and Albert Museum (1808)
- Monument to Sir Elijah Impey in St Paul's, Hammersmith (1809)
- Medallion of William Pitt the Younger, National Portrait Gallery (1809)
- Monument to Thomas Brograve at Springfield, Essex (1810)
- Monument to John Hyde at Mitcham Church, Surrey (1810)
- Monument to Christopher Tower at Iver, Bucks (1810)
- Monument to James Marwood at Widworthy, Devon (1811)
- Carving on a tablet designed by Sir John Soane recording the history of the church at Daylesford, Gloucestershire (1816)
- Monument to the Rev. John Vardill of Marylebone Parish Church, London (1811)
- Monument to Paul Orchard at Hartland, Devon (1812)
- Monument to Thomas Ruggles at Finchingfield, Essex (1813)
- Monument to Joseph Green at Bocking, Essex (1814)
- Medallion of Matthew Boulton, Victoria and Albert Museum (1814)
- Medallion of Prince Lucien Bonaparte, Victoria and Albert Museum (1814)
- Monument to Elizabeth Laing at Streatham Parish Church in London (1816)
- Monument to Granville Charles Wheler at Otterden, Kent (1818)
- Medallion of the Duke of Wellington at the Victoria and Albert Museum (1818)
- Monument to Jane Micklethwait at Salehurst, Sussex (1819)
- Monument to Capel Cure at Bovinger, Essex (1820)
- Monument to Robert Burton at North Cave, Yorkshire (1822)
- Monument to William Merle at Weybridge in Surrey (1822)
- Medallion of the Duke of Wellington, Victoria and Albert Museum (1822)
- Monument to Rev George Thorold at Hougham, Lincolnshire (1823)
- Monument to Elizabeth Merle at Weybridge in Surrey (1825)
- Monument to John Farquhar (gunpowder dealer) at St John's Wood Church, London (1826)
- Monument to Foster Pigott at Abington Pigott, Cambridgeshire (1827)
- Monument to Stephen Pellet at Paddington Parish Church, London (1827)
- Monument to Granville Wheler at Otterden, Kent (1828)
- Monument to Mrs Creswell at St George's Church, Bloomsbury (1828)
- Monument to Rev. William Tucker at Honiton, Devon (1830)
- Monument to Rev. Thomas Tucker at Widworthy, Devon (1830)
- Monument to William Shield at Brightling, Sussex (1830)
- Monument to Jemima Pigott at Whitechurch, Oxfordshire (1832)
- Monument to Sarah Hawkins at Rivenhall, Essex (1832)
- Monument to Lady de la Pole at Shute, Devon (1832)
- Monument to Sir John Sewell at Marylebone Parish Church, London (1833)
- Monument to John Ewart at Worth, Sussex (1834)
- Monument to Catherine Ewart at Worth, Sussex (1835)
- Monument to Mrs. Schemberg at Shute, Devon (1837)
- Monument to Mrs. Tattershall at Otterden, Kent (1837)
- Monument to William Richardson at St John's Wood Church, London (1838)
- Bust of Thomas White at Widworthy, Devon (1838)
- Monument to Sir Herbert Taylor (British Army officer) at St Katherine's Church, Regent Park. London (1839)
- Monument to William Money at Kensal Green Cemetery (1840)
- 3 marble portrait busts of young ladies, "members of the Thorold family of Syston Hall, Grantham", signed P. Rouw Sculpt'r, 1830, 70 cm high". Sold by Tennants Auctioneers, Leyburn, lots 1258–60, 18 Nov 2010. The dealer Michael Sim recently found the following note within one of Rouw's wax medallions: Portrait of Mrs E. Thorold. Peter Rouw, sculptor and modeller of gems and cameos for His Royal Highness, Prince of Wales. Upper Titchfield Street, Fitzroy Square, London 1810, and termed it "one of Rouw’s finest portraits, with superb detailing of Mrs Thorold’s dress, necklace and informally arranged hair".
