= Alexander Wood (surgeon) =

Scottish surgeon (1725–1807)

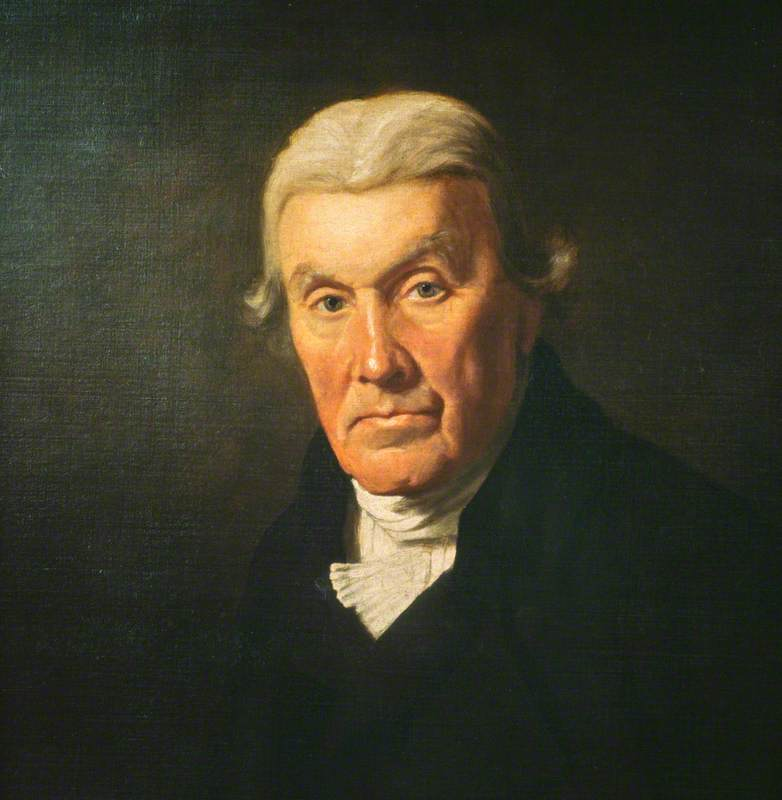
- Born: 14 June 1725; Restalrig, Scotland
- Died: 12 May 1807 (aged 81); Edinburgh, Scotland
- Education: University of Edinburgh
- Occupation: surgeon
- Known for: Friendship with Robert Burns; First man in Edinburgh to use an umbrella Excentricities including owning a raven and a sheep as pets
- Medical career
- Sub-specialties: surgery

Alexander Wood (14 June 1725 – 12 May 1807) was a Scottish surgeon, who was active in the convivial clubs which flourished in Enlightenment Edinburgh and was the founder of two of these. Owing to his lean, lanky physique he was better known to his contemporaries and to posterity as "Lang Sandy" Wood. His treatment of and friendship with the poet Robert Burns contributed to the local celebrity status which he attained.

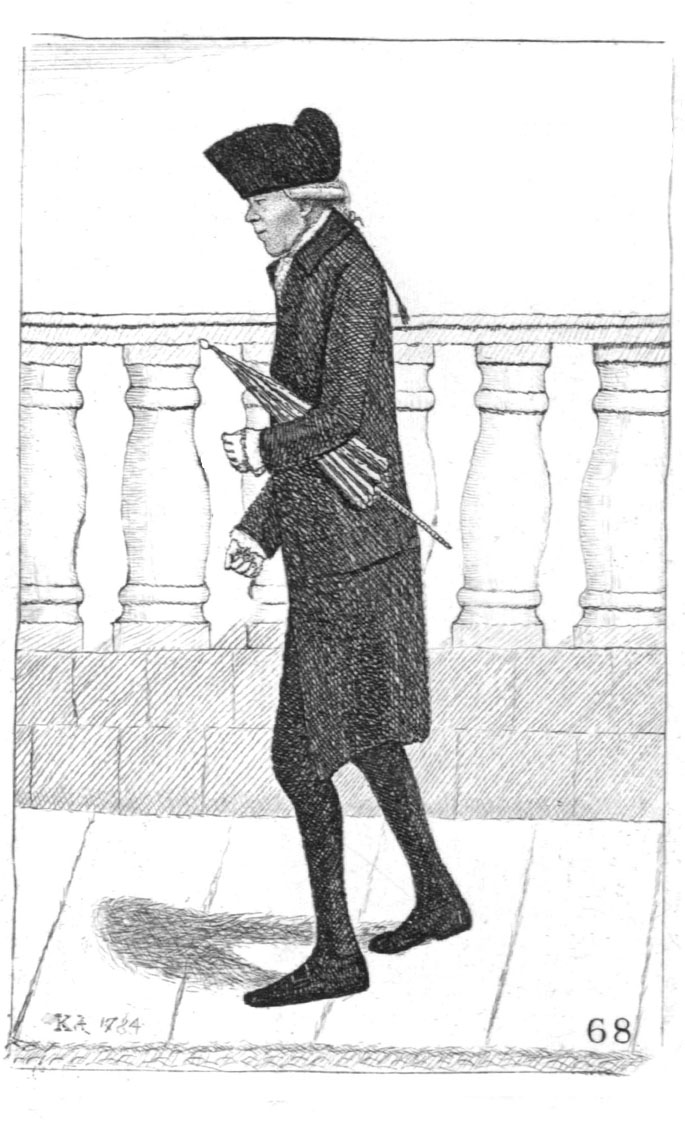
In this portrait Wood is depicted by John Kay with an umbrella. He was the first person in Edinburgh to use one. Kay's portraits.1842

== Early life and education ==
Wood was born at Restalrig on 14 June 1725, the son of Thomas Wood (1702–1798), a farmer, and his wife Janet Lamb. He studied medicine at the University of Edinburgh and after graduating took up practice in Musselburgh.

== Medical practice ==
He became a Freeman of the Incorporation of Surgeons of Edinburgh in 1756, and was appointed to the staff of the new Royal Infirmary of Edinburgh. Elected Deacon (President) of the Incorporation of Surgeons in 1762, he held office for two years. He was in surgical practice with the surgeons John Rattray (1707–1771) and Charles Congleton. Two of his pupils held him in high regard; surgeon John Bell (1763–1820) dedicated his book Anatomy of the Human Body to Wood to him and Sir Alexander Morison (1779–1866), the pioneer of psychiatric medicine, composed a poem in his honour.

As far as is known, he made no known contributions to the advancement of surgical knowledge.

== Personal and social life ==
Wood married Veronica Chalmers and one of their sons, Sir Alexander Wood, married the eldest daughter of Sir William Forbes, 6th Baronet, and later became Chief Secretary for the government of Malta. His brother Thomas Wood (1747–1821) and son George Wood were also Edinburgh surgeons. George's son was Alexander Wood, Lord Wood. His grand-nephew Dr Alexander Wood (1817–1884) introduced hypodermic medication into medical practice.

Wood became a well known and popular figure in Edinburgh with a reputation for a warm and generous nature. He was a member of many dining clubs and convivial societies which characterised the Scottish Enlightenment in Edinburgh. In 1773 he was elected a member of the newly-formed Aesculapian Club. On 12 April 1782 Wood was one of the founding members of the Harveian Society of Edinburgh and served as President in 1783 and 1803.

He was known for his personal idiosyncrasies and was often accompanied around Edinburgh by two pets, a tame sheep and a raven which perched on his shoulder. He was said to be the first person in Edinburgh to own and use an umbrella which he did from 1780.

In June 1792 he infamously narrowly escaped death during the Dundas Riots when he was mistaken for the Lord Provost, Sir James Stirling, and threatened with being thrown off North Bridge.

Lord Byron included a couplet about him in the 5th canto of his poem Childe Harold's Pilgrimage in which he describes contemporary Edinburgh and some of its characters. It was published in Blackwood's Magazine in May 1818:

"Oh! for an hour of him who knew no feud, The octogenarian chief, the kind old Sandy Wood!"

== Friendship with Robert Burns ==
After he treated a leg injury sustained by the poet Robert Burns on his visit to Edinburgh in 1787, Burns's close friend Agnes Maclehose (Clarinda), herself a surgeon's daughter, wrote to Burns, "I am glad to hear Mr Wood attends you. He is a good soul and a safe surgeon. Do as he bids and I trust your leg will soon be quite well". Wood and Burns became friends with Burns referring to "My very worthy respected friend, Mr Alexander Wood" and to "one of the noblest men in God’s world - Alexander Wood, Surgeon".

Wood died on 12 May 1807, in Edinburgh. He was 82 years old. He is buried at Restalrig churchyard.
