= Chad baronets =

Sir George Chad
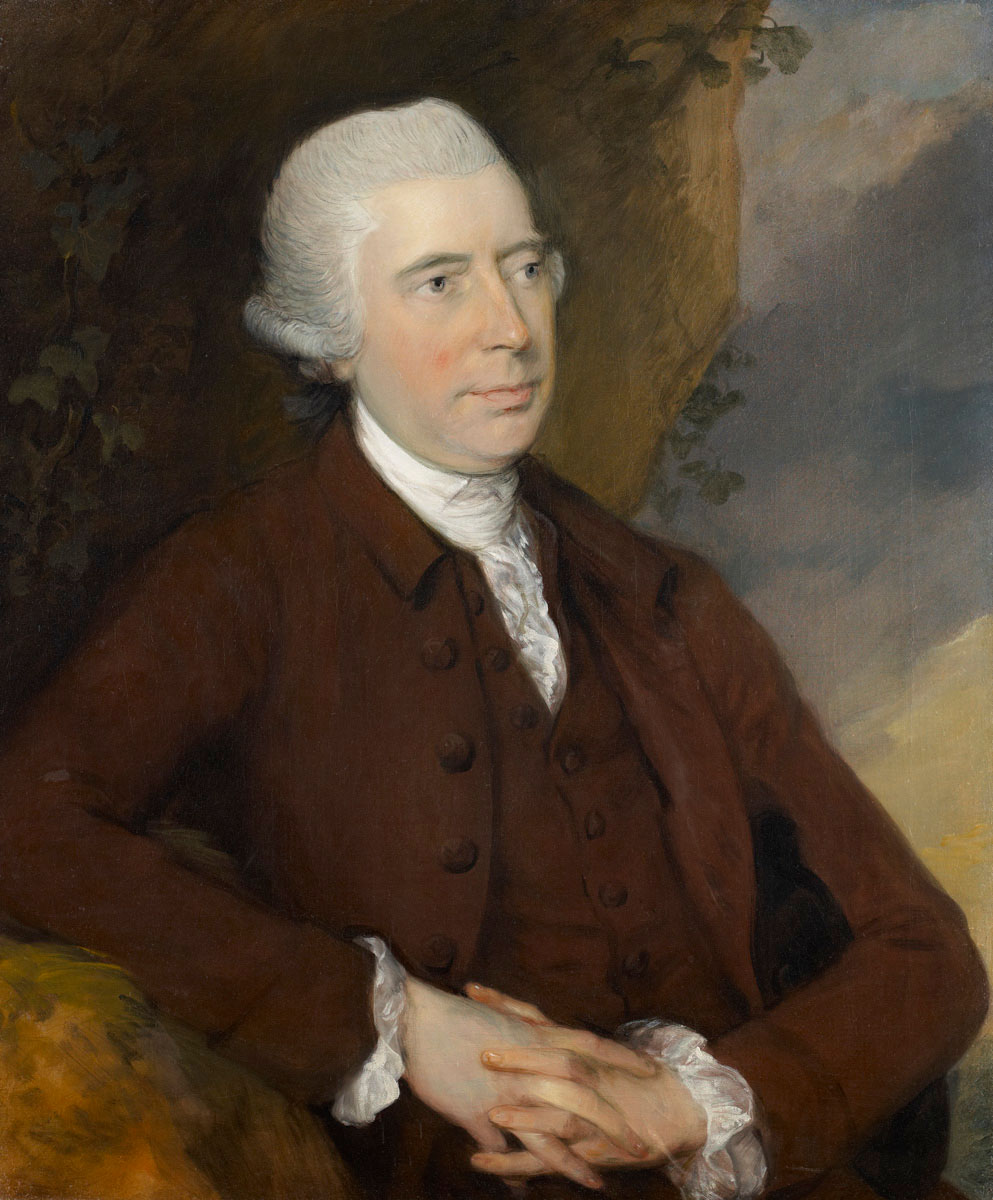
- Portrait, oil on canvas by Thomas Gainsborough, circa 1775.

Escutcheon of the Chad baronets of Thursford

The Chad baronetcy, of Thursford in the County of Norfolk, was a title in the Baronetage of Great Britain. It was created on 28 July 1791 for George Chad, a barrister and landowner, and Recorder of King's Lynn. He had purchased the Thursford Hall estate in 1753.

The title became extinct on the death of his only surviving son, the 2nd Baronet, in 1855.

== Chad baronets, of Thursford (1791) ==
- Sir George Chad, 1st Baronet (1730–1815)
- Sir Charles Chad, 2nd Baronet (1779–1855)

== Extended family ==
The diplomat George William Chad was the second son of the 1st Baronet.

Baronetage of Great Britain
Preceded by Tapps baronets	Chad baronets of Thursford; 28 July 1791	Succeeded by Brograve baronets
