= St Ann's Church, HMNB Portsmouth =

St. Ann's Church
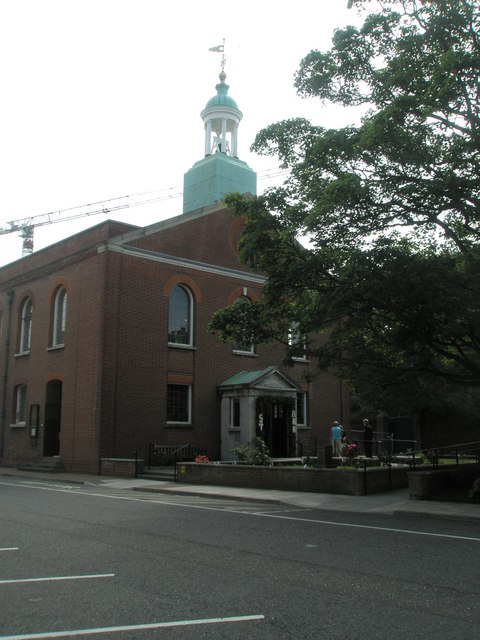
- St Ann's Church within Her Majesty's Naval Base Portsmouth
- St. Ann's Church
- 50°48′4.42″N 1°6′17.82″W
- OS grid reference: SU 63171 00567
- Location: Sunny Walk; Portsmouth; PO1 3PX
- Country: England
- Denomination: Anglican
- Website: www.royalnavy.mod.uk

History
- Status: Church
- Dedication: St, Ann
- Dedicated: 1786

Architecture
- Functional status: Active
- Heritage designation: Grade II listed
- Designated: 25 September 1972
- Style: Georgian

Specifications
- Materials: Red brick

Administration
- Diocese: Portsmouth
- Archdeaconry: Archdeaconry of the Royal Navy

St Ann's Church is an Anglican chapel within His Majesty's Naval Base Portsmouth. It is regarded as the spiritual home of the Royal Navy, and contains numerous memorials to men lost at sea.

The original church was built in 1704, on the site of what is now Admiralty House. The present church was opened in 1786, and is built in red brick in Flemish bond. It was possibly designed by Marquand, a Navy Board surveyor, working under Samuel Wyatt at Admiralty House. The contractors were Thomas Parlby & Sons. The church suffered some bomb damage in May 1941, and was restored in 1955–6.

As the oldest surviving chapel in a navy yard, it was Grade II listed on 25 September 1972.

In October 2012, the church held ceremonies marking the 30th anniversary of the Falklands War, attended by Anne, Princess Royal. As of 2015 the current chaplain is Revd. James Francis, RN.

The HMS Royal Oak Association holds an Act of Remembrance annually at the church on the Saturday nearest to 13 October, the date of the sinking of the battleship HMS Royal Oak (08) at Scapa Flow in 1939. At the service on 9 October 2019, eighty years after the ship was torpedoed, a memorial stone was unveiled in the church by The Princess Royal. Although the last survivor died in 2016, some one hundred and fifty relatives and descendants of the crew attended.

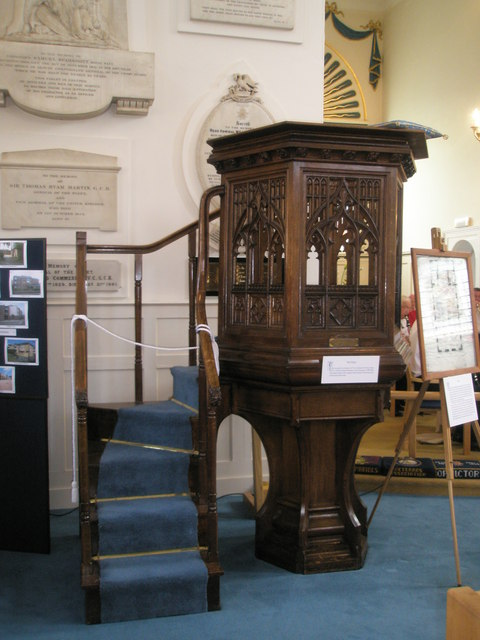
The pulpit within St Ann's

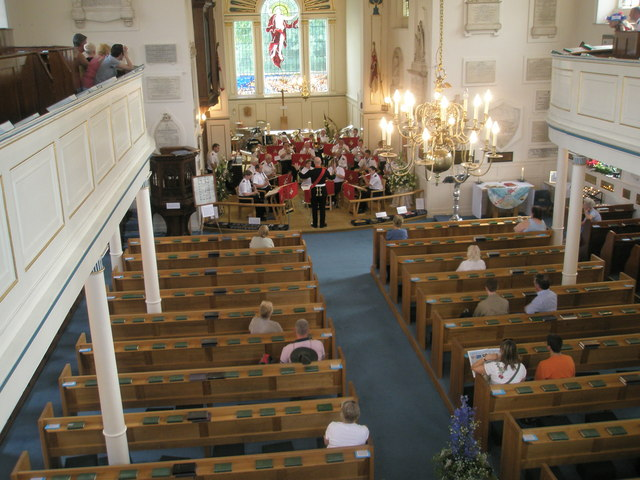
Concert within St Ann's Church, 2008

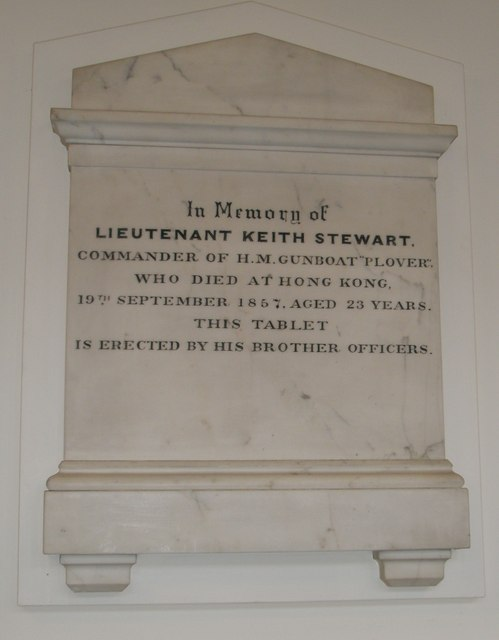
Memorial tablet
