= Sir John de la Pole, 6th Baronet =

British politician (1757–1799)

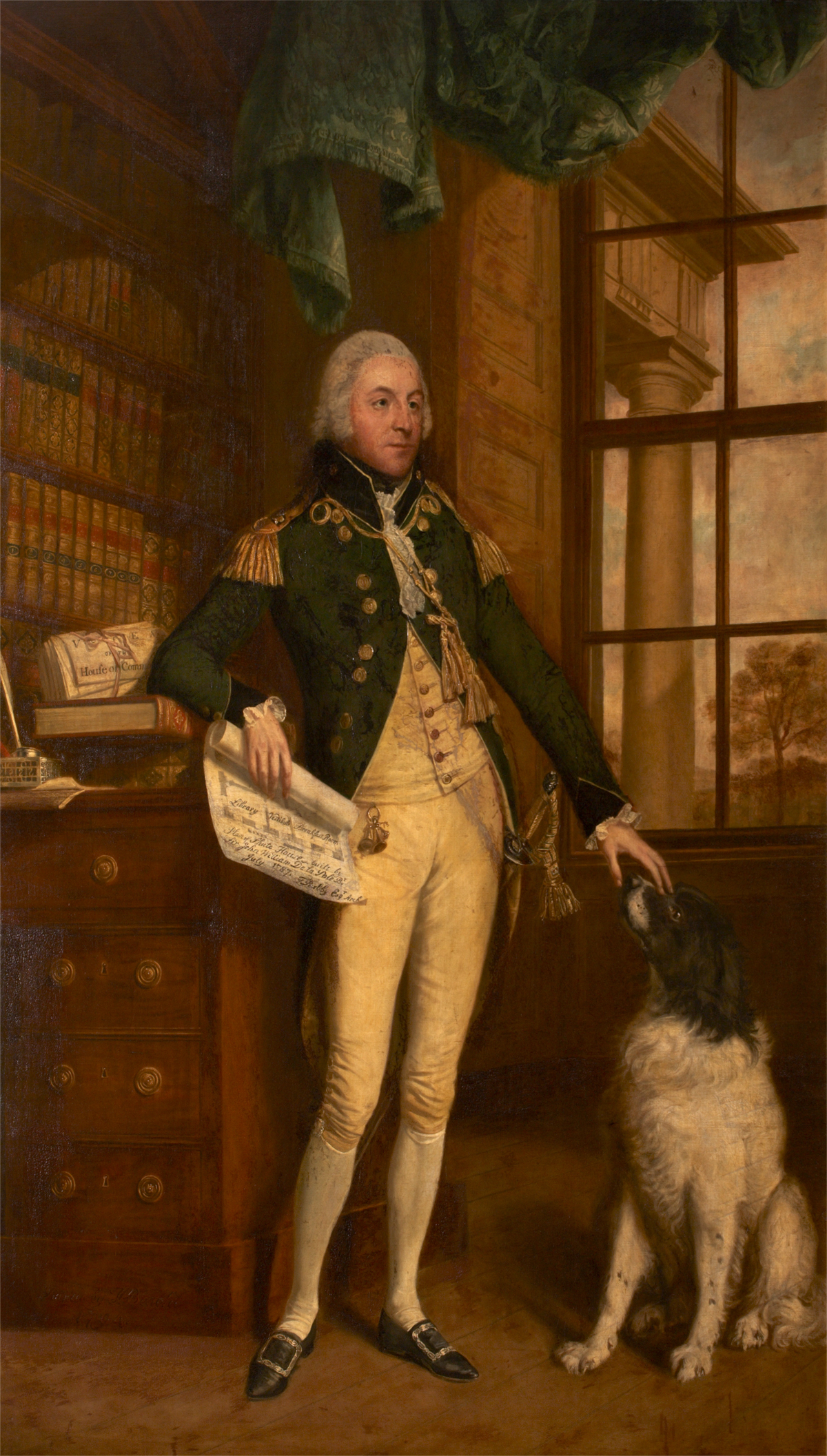
Sir John de la Pole, 6th Baronet (1757–1799), in uniform of Deputy Lieutenant of Devon, in the library of New Shute House, Devon, built by him between 1787 and 1789, holding a plan of his new house in his right hand, from close study of which Maureen Turner (1999) was the first to discover the name of the architect Thomas Parlby, Esquire (1727–1802), his wife's uncle, the business partner and brother-in-law of James Templer, Senior, Sir John's father-in-law. The Doric portico is visible through the window. Portrait by Thomas Beach (1738–1806), collection of Sir Richard Carew-Pole, Antony House, Cornwall

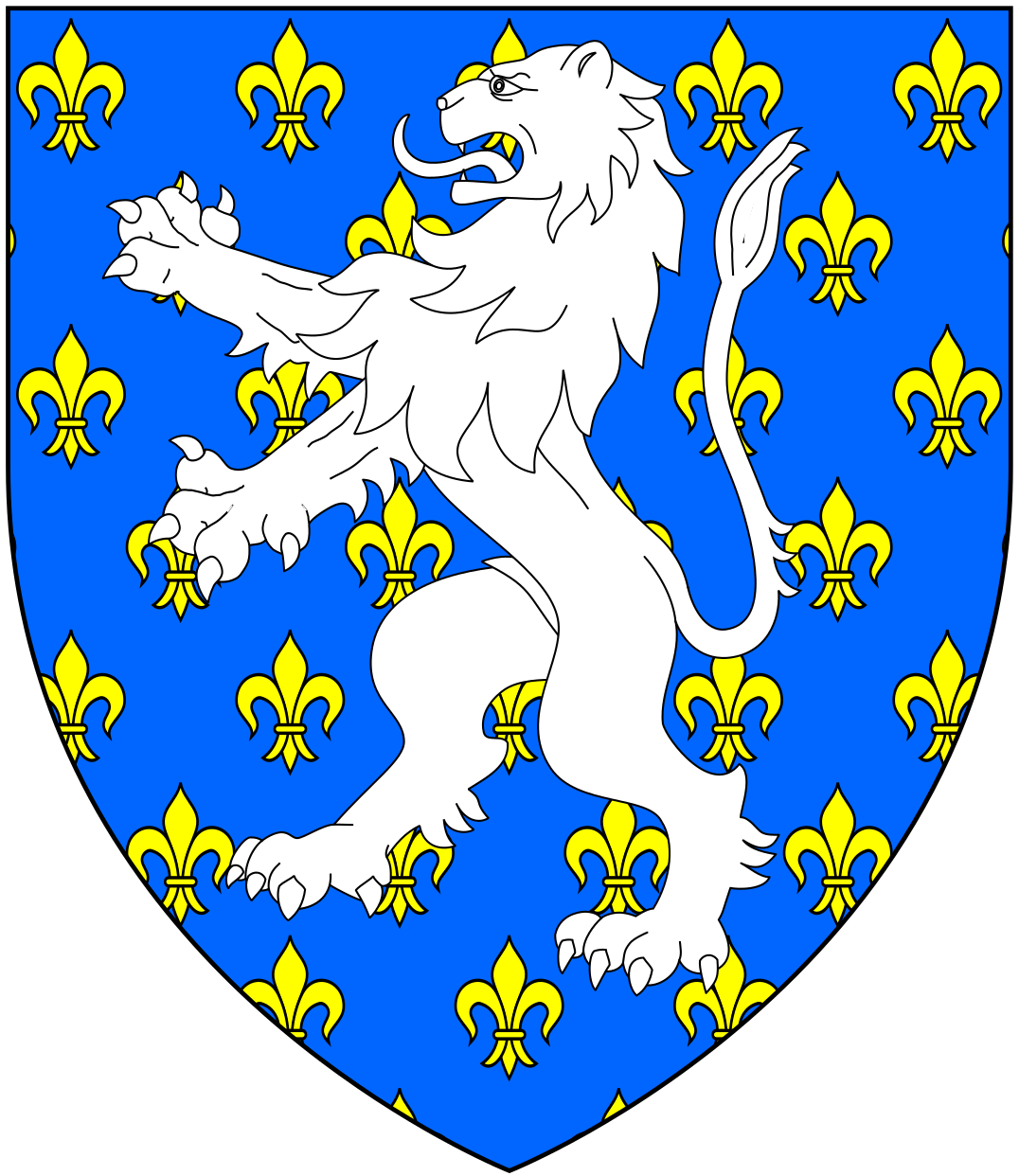
Arms of Pole of Shute: Azure semée of fleur-de-lys or, a lion rampant argent

Sir John William de la Pole, 6th Baronet MP (26 June 1757 – 30 November 1799) of Shute in the parish of Colyton, Devon, was a Member of Parliament for the rotten borough of West Looe. In 1791 he published, under the title Collections Towards a Description of the County of Devon, the researches on the history and genealogy of Devonshire made by his ancestor the antiquary Sir William Pole (d.1635), which he did not publish in his lifetime and which were enlarged by his son Sir John Pole, 1st Baronet, but which were partly destroyed during the Civil War at Colcombe Castle.

== Origins ==
He was born on 26 June 1757, the son of Sir John Pole, 5th Baronet (c. 1733–1760) by his first wife Elizabeth Mills (d. 1758), daughter and co-heiress of John Mills, a banker and planter of St. Kitts, West Indies and Woodford, Essex. Thus he lost both his parents when a small infant, his mother when he was aged 1 and his 27-year-old father at the age of 3. He assumed the surname of de la Pole by royal sign manual.

== Career ==
He was educated at Blundell's School in Tiverton and appointed High Sheriff of Devon for 1782. He represented the constituency of West Looe in Parliament from 1790 to 1796. He was listed as hostile to the repeal of the Test Act in 1791.

== Builds New Shute House ==
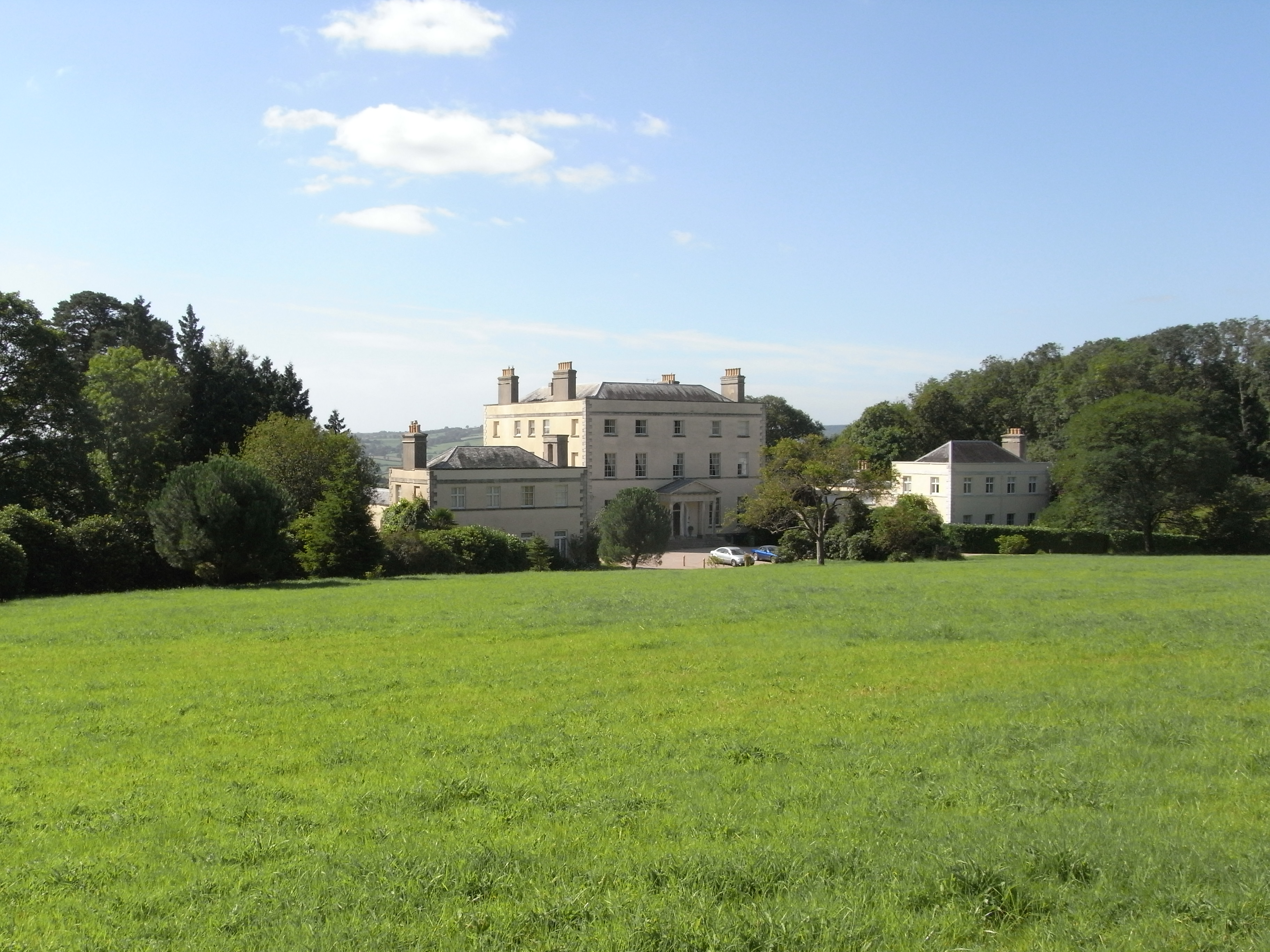
New Shute House, Shute, near Colyton, Devon, built 1787–89 by Sir John William de la Pole, 6th Bt (1757–1799). He demolished much of the Tudor part of Old Shute House and laid a one-mile driveway through the former building which leads onwards to New Shute House

Pole's greatest legacy apart from the collation and publication of the historical researches of his ancestor Sir William Pole (d.1635), is his building between 1787 and 1789 of New Shute House, an Adam style late Palladian country house near the mediaeval and Tudor Old Shute House, Colyton, Devon, purchased by his ancestor William Pole (1515–1587). It was designed and built by Thomas Parlby, his father-in-law's partner in their civil engineering business. The house remained the principal seat of the family until the death in 1926 of the unmarried and childless Sir Frederick Arundel de la Pole, 11th Baronet (1850–1926), great-grandson of the builder. He bequeathed the entire Shute Estate to his distant young cousin Sir John Carew-Pole of Antony House in Cornwall, descended from Carolus Pole, the younger brother of the 4th Baronet. In 1926 to meet the heavy death duties the house was let and its contents were sold at auction. It became a girls' school between 1933 and 1974, and was then turned together with its stables and wings into eight separate apartments. The main block, converted into two vertically divided residences is in 2012 again a single residence. old Shute House was retained by Sir John Carew-Pole until 1955 when he gave it to the National Trust on the proviso that members of his wider family would remain tenants, which they did until 2008.

== Marriage ==
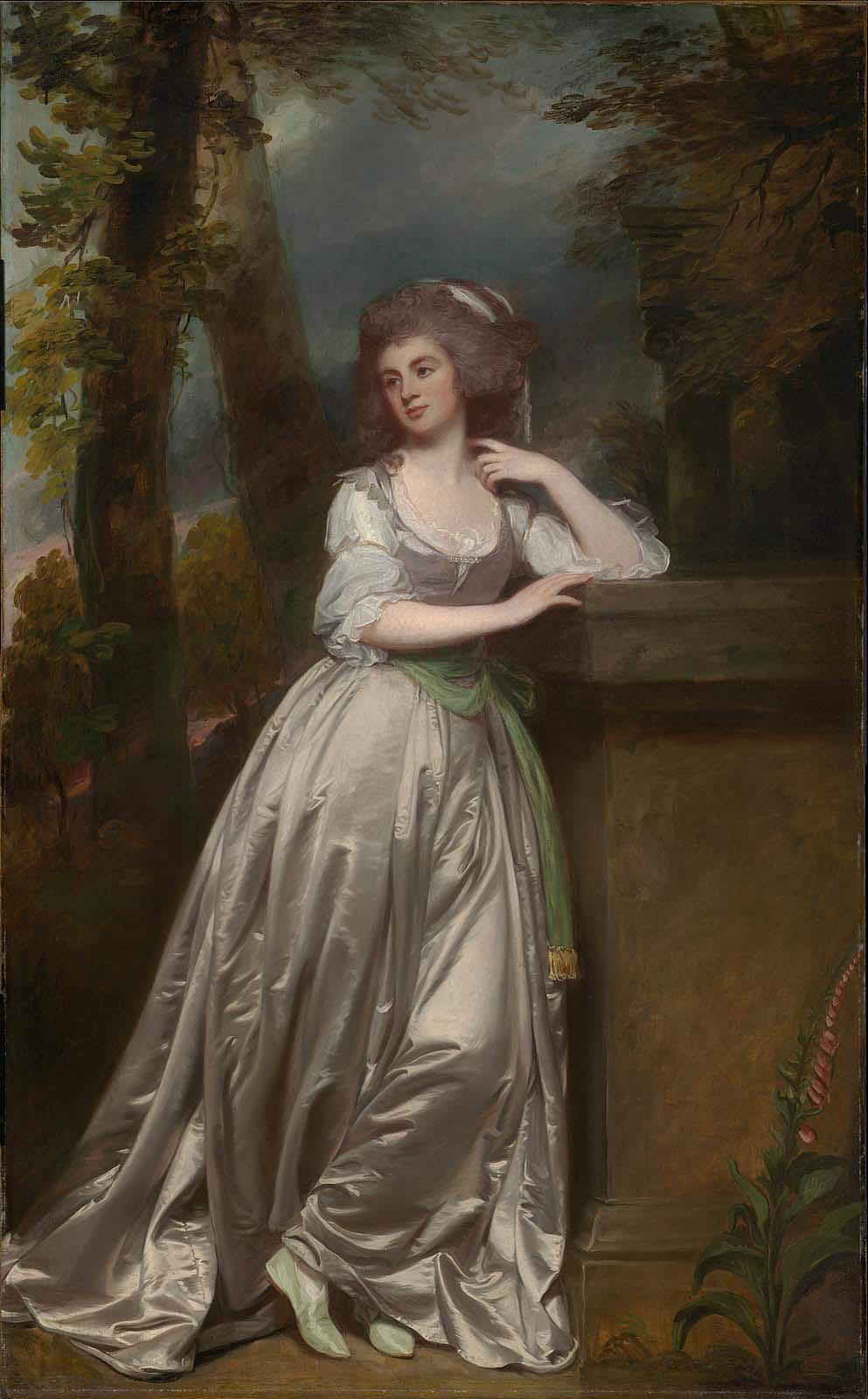
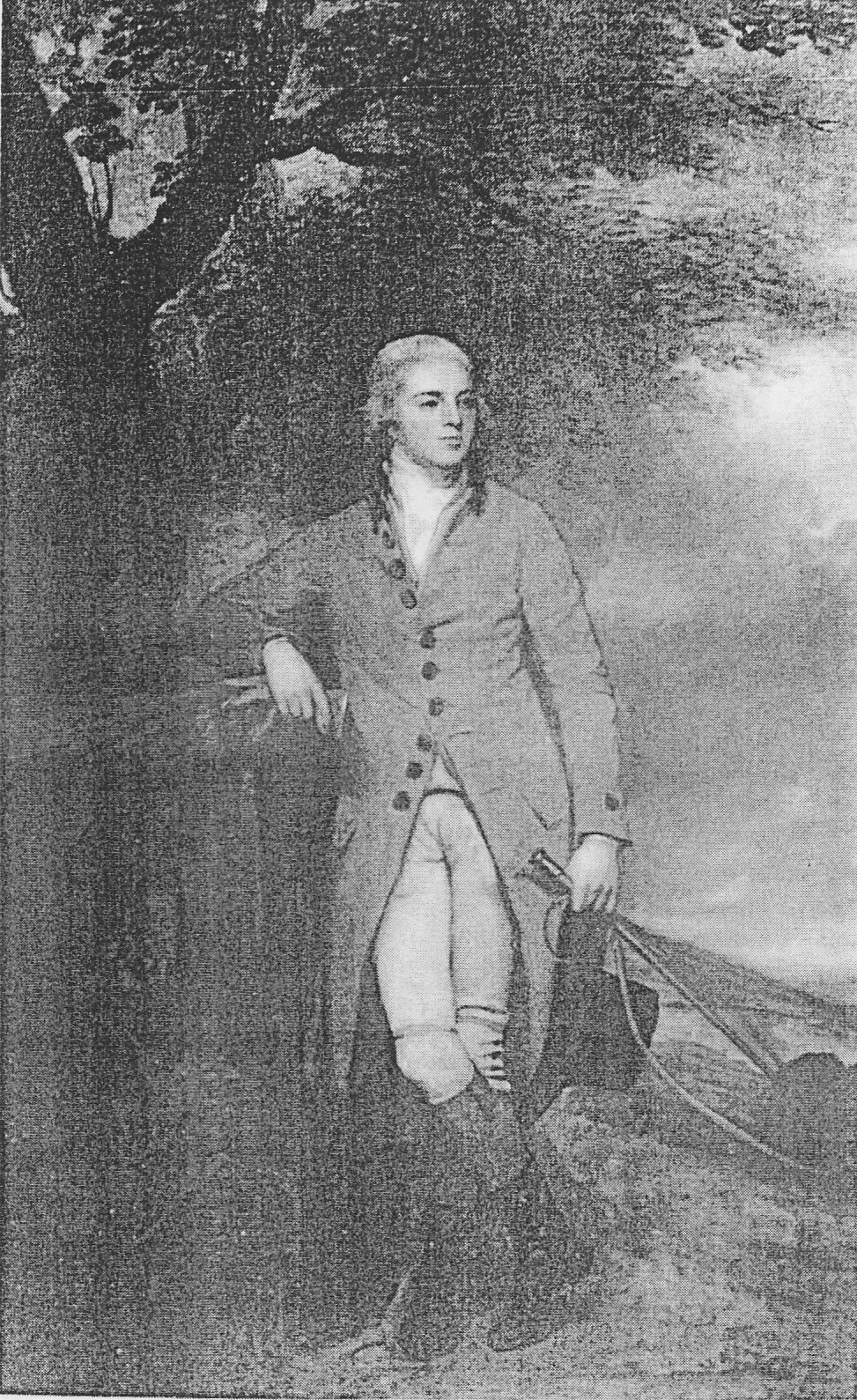
Left: Near life-size (94"*58") portrait of Lady Anne de la Pole (1758–1832) (nee Templer) by George Romney (1734–1802), painted in 1786. Sold by Sir Frederick Arundell de la Pole, 11th Baronet (1850–1926) at auction at Christie's London on 13 July 1913, purchased by the dealers Duveen Brothers of New York for 40,000 guineas ($206,850), a record price for any work of art sold in London. Acquired by Alvan T. Fuller, Governor of Massachusetts, acquired from Fuller Foundation by Museum of Fine Arts, Boston, US, owner in 2012. A copy exists at Antony House, Cornwall, a seat of the Pole family. Painted by Romney as pair with right: Portrait of her husband Sir John William de la Pole, 6th Baronet (1757–1799), standing in hunting apparel, with hat and whip in his left hand unknown collection. A copy exists at Antony House, Cornwall

He married Anne Templer (1758–1832) the daughter of James I Templer (1722–1782) of Stover House, Teigngrace, Devon, a self-made magnate who had made his fortune building dockyards under government contracts. Her mother was Mary Parlby (d.1784), the sister of Thomas Parlby (1727–1802) of Stone Hall, Stonehouse, in Plymouth, business partner of James Templer. The famous and immensely valuable portrait of Anne Templer painted by George Romney is now at the Museum of Fine Arts in Boston.

=== Templer family ===
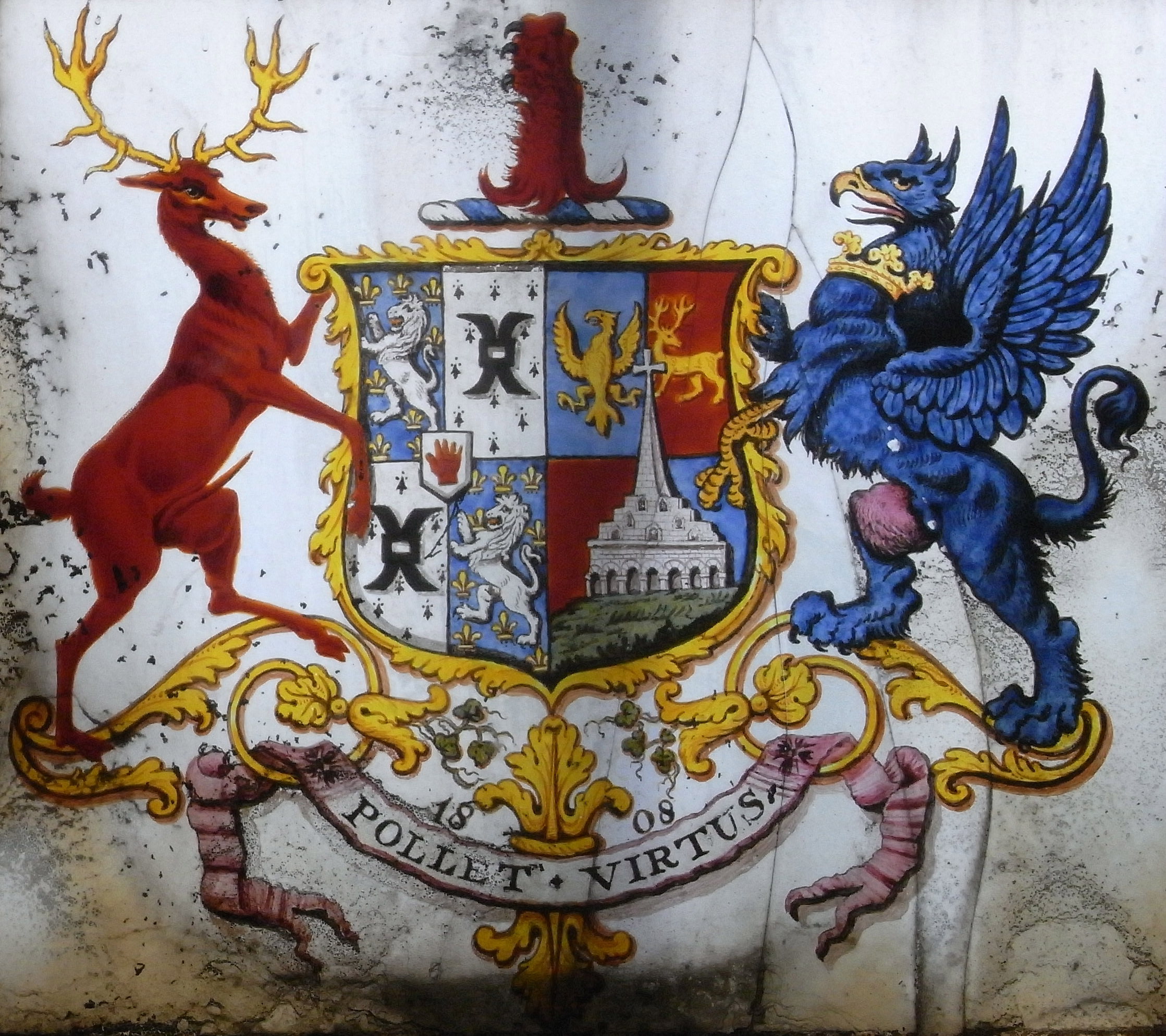
1808 commemorative stained glass window in Shute Church, Devon, south window of south transept, showing arms of Sir William Templer-Pole, 7th Baronet (1782–1847), son of 6th Baronet, impaling the arms of Templer, the family of his first cousin and first wife Sophia-Anne Templer (1788–1808), following whose death the window was made. Arms: Baron: quarterly 1st and 4th, Pole; 2nd & 3rd: Ermine, a millrind sable (Mills), over all an inescutcheon the Red Hand of Ulster; impaling femme: quarterly azure and gules, on a mount in base vert the perspective of an antique temple argent of three stories, each embattled; from the second battlement two steeples, and from the top, one, each ending in a cross sable on the pinnacle; in the first quarter an eagle displayed; in the second a stag trippant regardant or (Templer, granted 1765). The canting motto of Pole is shown below: Pollet Virtus, from the Latin verb Polleo, to be strong, mighty, thus: "Virtue is powerful", but which may also be read as Poll et Virtus, "Pole and Virtue"

James I Templer (1722–1782), father of Anne, was a self-made magnate. He was born in Exeter of a humble family, the son of Thomas Templer a brazier. He was orphaned young, whereupon his elder brother apprenticed him to John Bickley, a carpenter or architect of Exeter. He broke his indenture and set off for India where he made a fortune, either from government building contracts or possibly from dealing in silver bullion, before returning to England aged 23. He settled at Rotherhithe, Kent, where he obtained a government contract to re-build the dockyard with his partners John Line and Thomas Parlby. He married Mary Parlby (d.1784), the sister of his business partner and daughter of John Parlby of Chatham, Kent. He obtained with his partners in about 1760 the contract to rebuild Plymouth docks, for which he used granite from Haytor, and moved to Devon. In 1763 he obtained a grant of arms from the College of Arms, and in 1765 purchased the manor of Teignrace and Stover Lodge, which in 1780 he re-built in grander form on a nearby site. He died in 1782 and is commemorated by a monument in Teignrace Church, rebuilt in 1786 by his sons. Pevsner thought highly of this family stating: "The Templers were people of taste, as is clear from the building and their monuments". His son James Templer (1748–1813) built the Stover Canal in 1792 to help ship clay along the Teign Estuary from the Bovey Basin to the port of Teignmouth. Coal, manure and agricultural produce was also freighted along the canal. Granite from Hay Tor was used to build Stover House which was completed by 1792. By 1820 a granite tramway, which had rails cut from granite, was opened connecting the granite quarries of Haytor to the canal. This enabled large quantities of granite to be transported for major works like the new London Bridge which opened in 1825. George Templer (1755–1819), son of James Templer (Senior) and brother of Rev. John Templer, rector of Teigngrace, was the father of Sophia-Anne Templer, wife of her first cousin Sir William Templer-Pole, 7th Baronet (1782–1847). George Templer however overspent his resources and was forced to sell Stover House, Stover Canal, the Haytor Granite Tramway and most of the rest of the family's considerable estates to Edward St Maur, 11th Duke of Somerset, in 1829, in whose family it remained until 1921. In 1932 it became the Stover Girls' School, which occupies it still in 2012.

=== Monument to wife ===
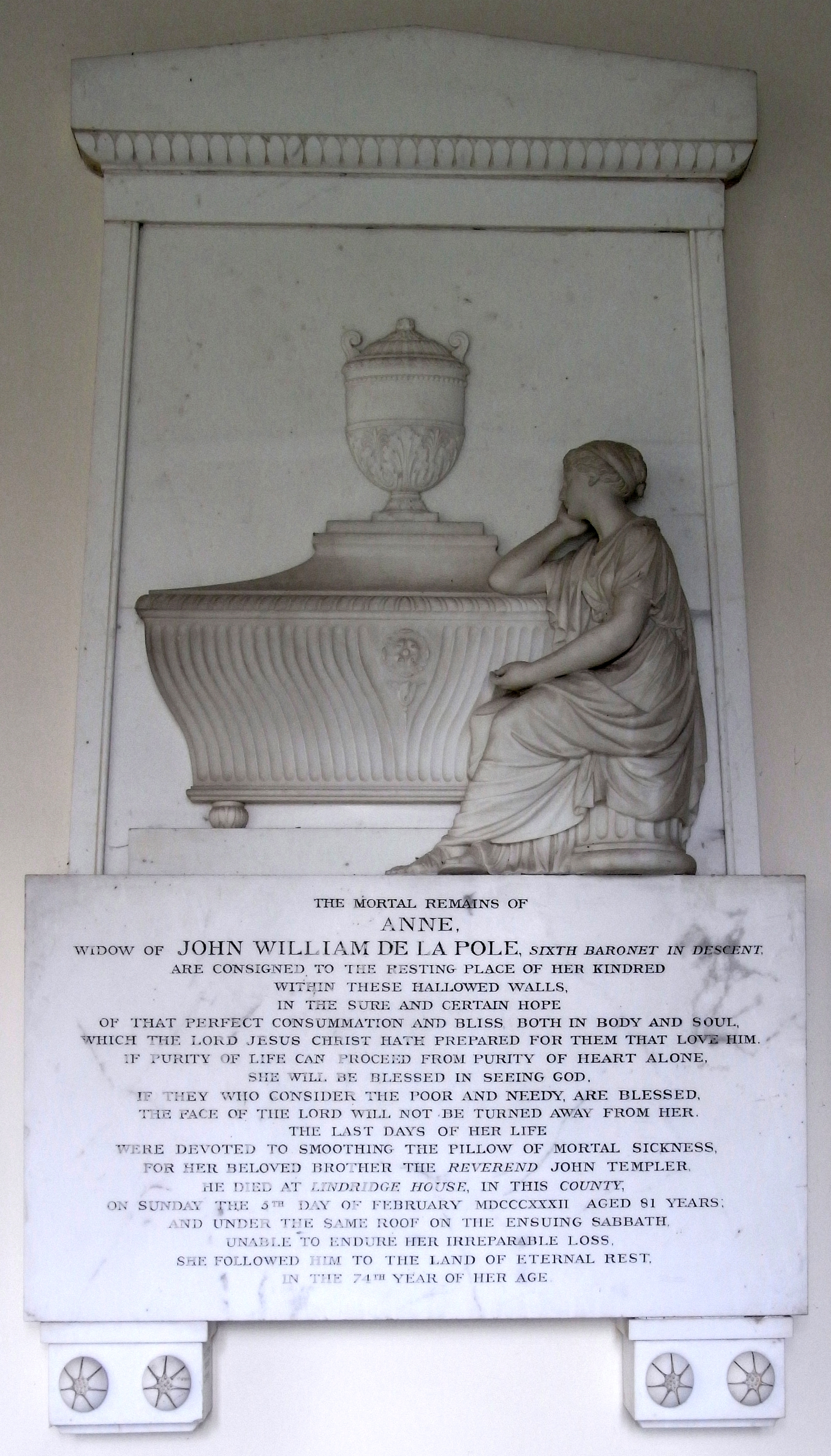
1832 mural monument to Lady Anne Pole (née Templer) (1758–1832), wife of Sir John de la Pole, 6th Baronet (1757–1799) signed: "P. Rouw sculp. London" (Peter Rouw (1771–1852)), west wall of south transept of St Michael's Church, Shute, Devon

The mural monument to Lady Anne Pole (née Templer) (1758–1832), wife of Sir John de la Pole, in Shute Church is inscribed as follows:

The mortal remains of Anne, widow of John William de la Pole, sixth baronet in descent, are consigned to the resting place of her kindred within these hallowed walls in the sure and certain hope of that perfect consummation and bliss both in body and soul which the Lord Jesus Christ hath prepared for them that love him. If purity of life can proceed from purity of heart alone she will be blessed in seeing God. If they who consider the poor and needy are blessed, the face of the Lord will not be turned away from her. The last days of her life were devoted to smoothing the pillow of mortal sickness for her beloved brother the Reverend John Templer. He died at Lindridge House in this county on Sunday the 5th day of February MDCCCXXXII aged 81 years and under the same roof on the ensuing Sabbath unable to endure her irreparable loss she followed him to the land of eternal rest in the 74th year of her age

== Children ==
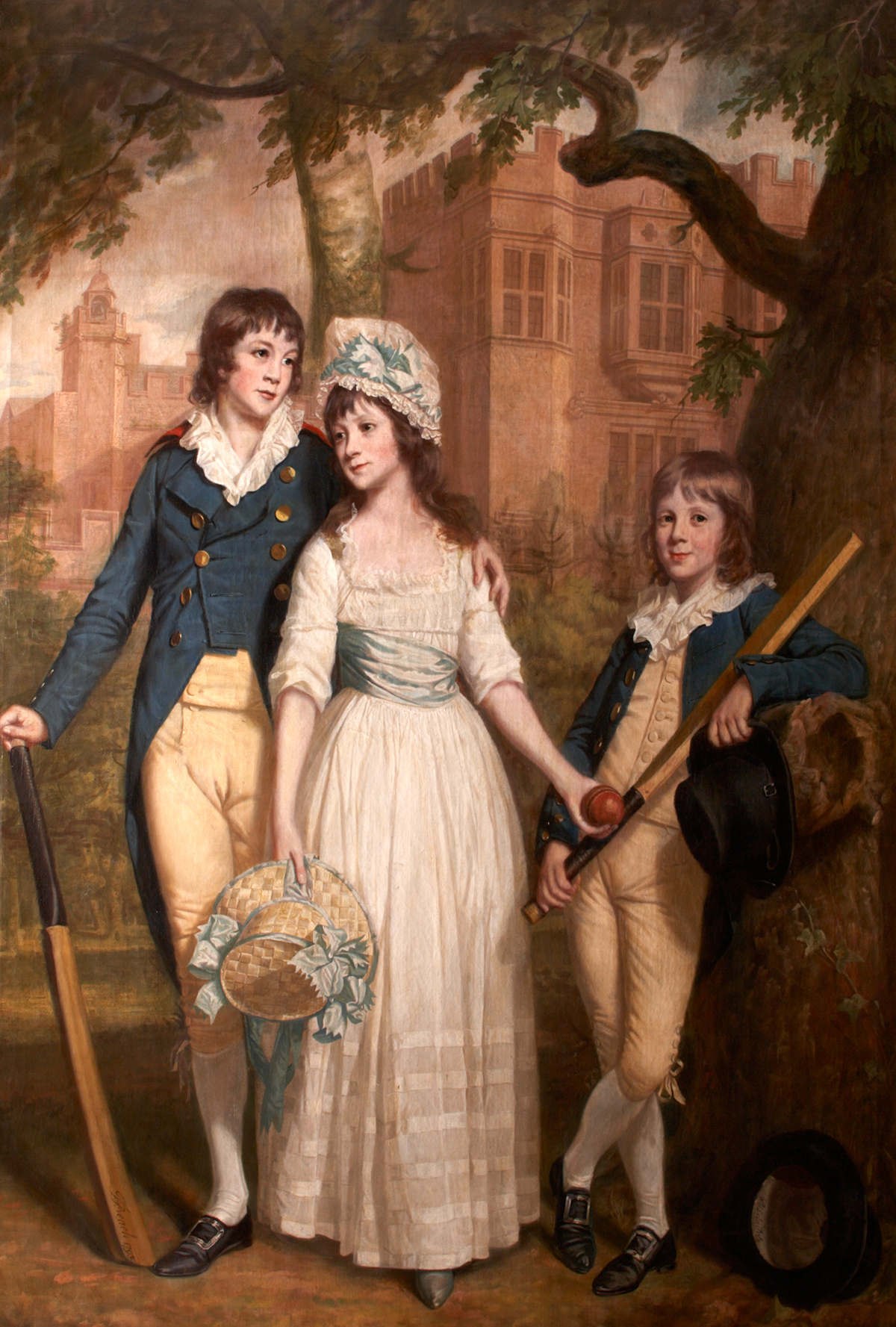
1793 Portrait by Thomas Beach with Old Shute House as background of the three children of Sir John William de la Pole, 6th Baronet (1757–1799): (l to r): William (1782–1847), future 7th Bt., Mary-Anne (b.1783) and John George (1786–1803). Collection at Antony House, Cornwall

By Anne Templer he had the following children:

- Sir William de la Pole, 7th Baronet (1782–1847)
- Mary Anne de la Pole (b.1783), married Mr West
- John George de la Pole (1786–1803)

A 1793 painting by Thomas Beach of these three children in a group exists at Antony House, Cornwall.

== Death and burial ==
He died on 30 November 1799. His will directed that he should not be removed from his house till the clearest and most unequivocal signs of death appear, to be ascertained by six persons.

== Monument in Shute Church ==
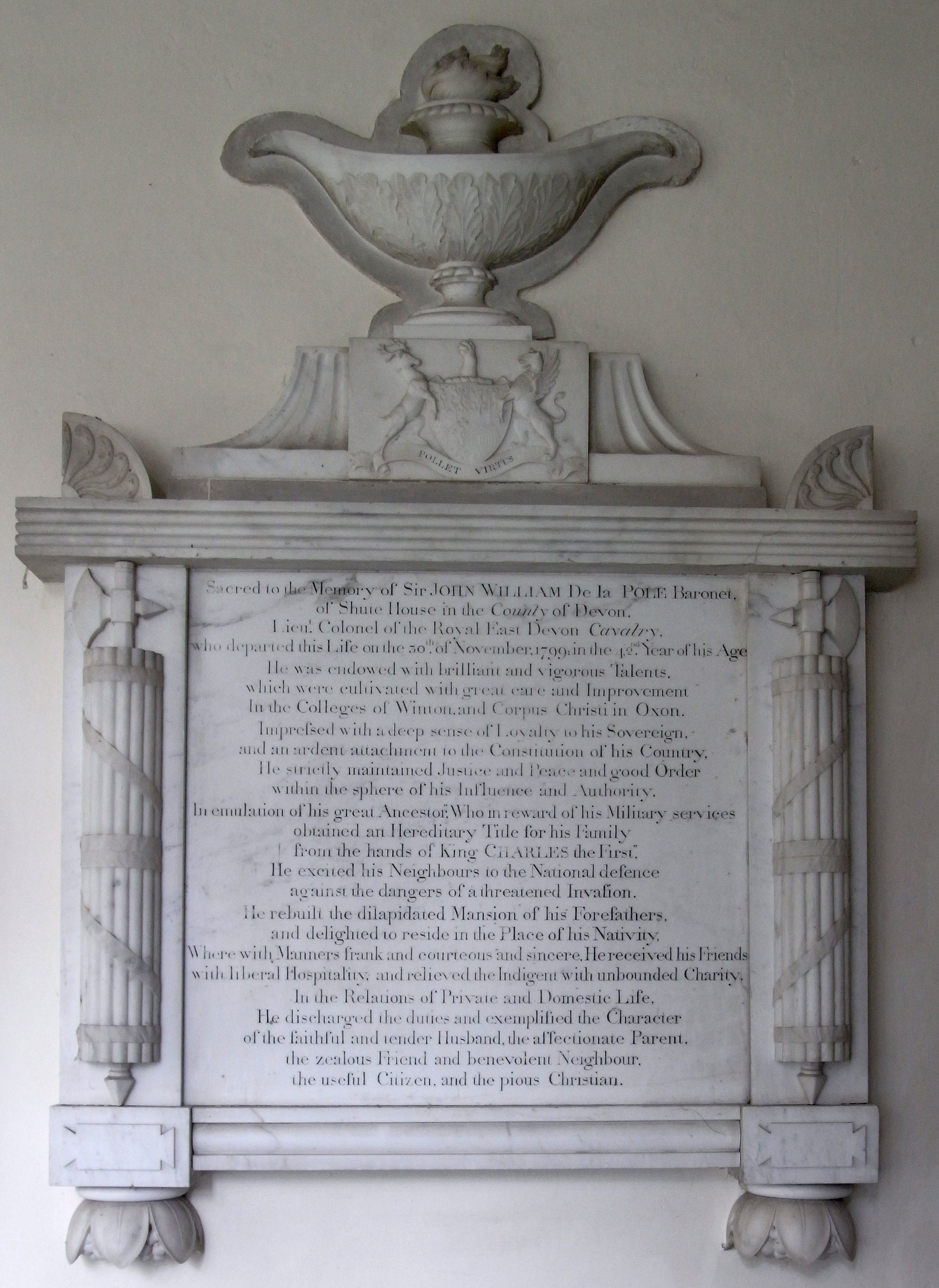
Mural monument to Sir John William de la Pole, 6th Baronet (1757–1799), St Michael's Church, Shute, west wall of south transept

A marble mural monument in his memory exists in Shute Church, signed "P.Rouw sculp. London", by Peter Rouw. It consists of an inscribed tablet flanked on either side by a fasces supporting an entablature on top of which, above his coat of arms, is a classical oil-lamp with flame:

Sacred to the memory of Sir John William de la Pole Baronet of Shute House in the county of Devon, Lieut. Colonel of the Royal East Devon Cavalry, who departed this life on the 30th November 1799 in the 42nd year of his age. He was endowed with brilliant and vigorous talents which were cultivated with great care and improvement in the colleges of Winton and Corpus Christi in Oxon. Impressed with a deep sense of loyalty for his sovereign and an ardent attachment to the constitution of his country he strictly maintained justice and peace and good order within the sphere of his influence and authority, in emulation of his great ancestor who in reward of his military services obtained an hereditary title for his family from the hands of King Charles the First. He excited his neighbours to the national defence against the dangers of a threatened invasion. He rebuilt the dilapidated mansion of his forefathers and delighted to reside in the place of his nativity where with manners frank and courteous and sincere he received his friends with liberal hospitality, and relieved the indigent with unbounded charity. In the relations of private and domestic life he discharged the duties and exemplified the character of a faithful and tender husband the affectionate parent, the zealous friend and benevolent neighbour, the useful citizen and the pious Christian.

== Sources ==
- Thorne, R. G., History of Parliament: House of Commons 1790–1820, Vol. 3
- Turner, Maureen A., The Building of New Shute House 1787–1790, MA dissertation, University of Exeter, Sept. 1999
- Bridie, Marion Ferguson, The Story of Shute: The Bonvilles and the Poles, Axminster, 1955. (Published by Shute School Ltd.), reprinted 1995, Bridport.

Parliament of Great Britain
Preceded by John Scott; James Adams	Member of Parliament for West Looe; 1790–1796; With: John Pardoe	Succeeded by Sitwell Sitwell; John Buller
Baronetage of England
Preceded by John Pole	Baronet (of Shute House); 1760–1799	Succeeded by William Templer Pole
