= Duckworth-King baronets =

The King, later Duckworth-King baronetcy, of Bellevue in the County of Kent, was a title in the Baronetage of Great Britain. It was created on 18 July 1792 for the naval officer and colonial governor Richard King.

He was succeeded by his son, the 2nd Baronet, also a naval officer; he commanded HMS Achille at the Battle of Trafalgar. The 4th Baronet assumed the additional surname of Duckworth in 1888. The title became extinct on the death of the 7th Baronet in 1972.

== King, later Duckworth-King baronets, of Bellevue (1792) ==
- Sir Richard King, 1st Baronet (1730–1806)
- Sir Richard King, 2nd Baronet (1774–1834)
- Sir Richard Duckworth King, 3rd Baronet (1804–1887)
- Sir George St Vincent Duckworth-King, 4th Baronet (1809–1891)
- Sir Dudley Gordon Alan Duckworth-King, 5th Baronet (1851–1909)
- Sir George Henry James Duckworth-King, 6th Baronet (1891–1952)
- Sir John Richard Duckworth-King, 7th Baronet (1899–1972), left no heir.

Baronetage of Great Britain
Preceded by Brograve baronets	King baronets of Bellevue; 18 July 1792	Succeeded by Stirling baronets
