= Sir James Stirling, 1st Baronet =

Scottish banker and lord provost of Edinburgh

Sir James Stirling, 1st Baronet of Larbert and Mansfield (c. 1740 – 17 February 1805) was a Scottish banker who served three consecutive terms as Lord Provost of Edinburgh.

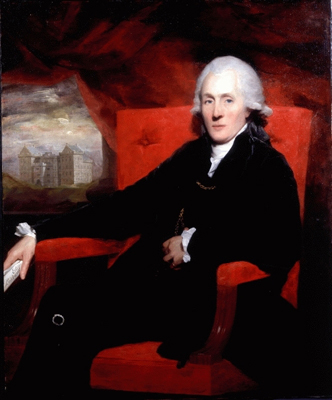
Sir James Stirling, dressed as Lord Provost, with a view of Edinburgh Tolbooth behind

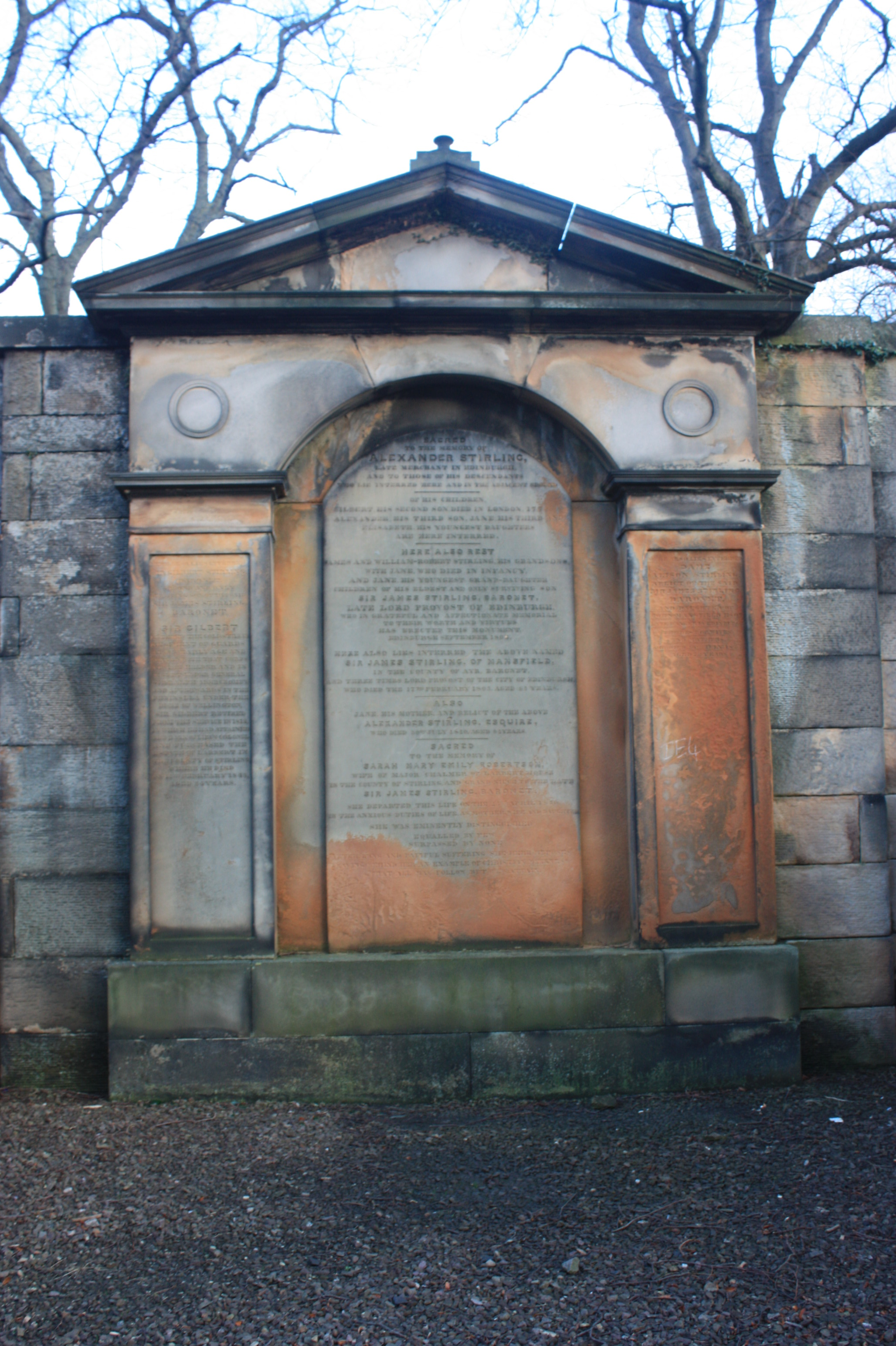
The grave of Sir James Stirling, Greyfriars Kirkyard

== Life ==
He was born in Edinburgh in 1740 or early in 1741, the son of Alexander Stirling, and his wife Jane Muir, daughter of James Muir of Lochfield in Perthshire. Although sometimes stated as the son of a cloth merchant, more contemporary records state he was the son of a fish merchant standing on the Royal Mile at the head of Marlin's Wynd, now the site of the Tron Kirk. As the church predates this, the description must mean facing the Tron Kirk.

In early life he went to the West Indies as clerk to Archibald Stirling of Keir, a sugar plantation owner there (great-uncle of Sir William Stirling-Maxwell). Not long afterwards James was appointed, through Archibald's influence, as secretary to Sir John Dalling, the governor of Jamaica.

Having acquired a fortune in the West Indies, Stirling returned to Edinburgh, and became partner in the banking house of Mansfield, Ramsay, & Co. based in Cantore's close in the Luckenbooths next to St Giles Cathedral.

He served on the town council of Edinburgh in 1771, he filled the office of treasurer in 1773–4, and served three consecutive terms as Lord Provost from 1790 to 1800 in total. For his conduct during the reform riots in 1792 (in Edinburgh called the Dundas Riots) he was on 17 July of that year created a baronet. He was then living on St Andrew Square just north of Rose Street.

Stirling was unpopular, and the surgeon Alexander Wood was in danger of being thrown over the North Bridge on being mistaken for him during the Dundas Riots in June 1792.

In 1793 he authorised the take over of Peter Williamson's existing private postal service, and transformed the system into one of the first penny post systems.

In his later life he lived at 69 Queen Street, an elegant townhouse in Edinburgh's First New Town (now demolished).

He died on 17 February 1805. He is buried in the western section of Greyfriars Kirkyard in Edinburgh against the eastern wall, with his parents and children.

== Family ==
Stirling married Alison Mansfield, the daughter of James Mansfield, the senior partner in Mansfield, Ramsay, & Co, his employer.

He left three sons and two daughters.

He was succeeded in the baronetcy by his eldest son, Gilbert Stirling, a Lieutenant in the Coldstream Guards, on whose death in 1843 the baronetcy became extinct.

His daughter Janet Stirling married Admiral Sir Thomas Livingston (1769–1853) of Westquarter near Falkirk.

== Notes ==
Attribution

This article incorporates text from a publication now in the public domain: Lee, Sidney, ed. (1898). "Stirling, James (1740?-1805)". Dictionary of National Biography. Vol. 54. London: Smith, Elder & Co.

Baronetage of Great Britain
New creation	Baronet (of Mansfield); 1792–1805	Succeeded by Gilbert Stirling
