= Dundas Riots =

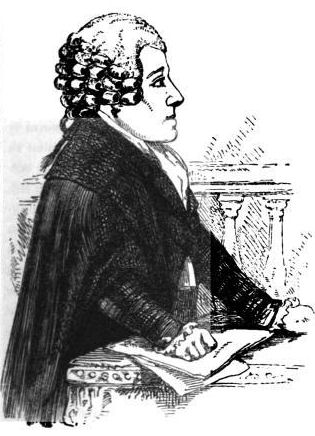
Robert Dundas of Arniston

The Dundas Riots were a series of riots in Edinburgh over three consecutive days in June 1792. They are sometimes also called the King's Birthday Riots.

== Background ==
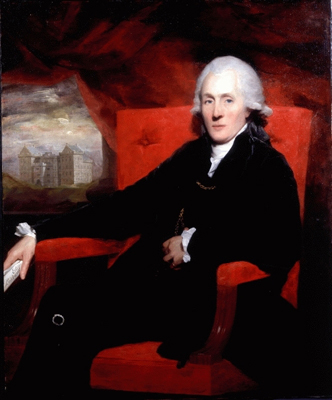
Sir James Stirling, dressed as Lord Provost, with a view of Edinburgh Tolbooth prison behind

The riots came on the back of a period of civil unrest, variously sourced from feelings transferring from the French Revolution, further changes in the Corn Laws, food shortages, and a general unhappiness of the population with their leading figures in politics and law. A proclamation banning "seditious writing" had been passed in May 1792.

It was traditional at that time for officials and soldiers to celebrate the birthday of King George III: 4 June.

On the days preceding the riots, the Lord Provost of Edinburgh, Sir James Stirling of Larbert, had cavalry soldiers roaming the Edinburgh streets to intimidate the population. This had the reverse effect, and angered the general population.

== The Riots ==
On the evening of 4 June members of the City Guard and Cavalry were getting drunk at Old Parliament Hall near St Giles Cathedral. They fired pistols in the air with each toast. A mob appeared outside and were dispersed after some stone-throwing. No-one was injured.

On the following evening (5 June) a small mob (not necessarily the same group) gathered outside the house of Robert Dundas of Arniston, Lord Justice Clerk at the time. This was at 57 George Square in the north-east corner. They had a straw effigy of a man. Dundas's neighbours, Admiral Duncan of Camperdown and Sir Patrick Murray of Ochtertyre, tried to dispel the crowd but stone-throwing began and they all sheltered in Dundas's house. The crowd began to break the windows and a servant was sent via the back door to run to Edinburgh Castle for assistance.

The servant persuaded the commander of the castle to send around a dozen troops from the 53rd Cavalry Regiment, armed with sabres and pistols, to the Dundas house. Given the day, it is highly likely that the troops were intoxicated. Arriving at George Square probably around 40 to 60 minutes after being sent for, the crowd was still there. The Riot Act was read. This was a legal requirement before physical force was used, but the action in its own right is clearly inflammatory, as it implies an intention to attack. Immediately upon completion of the reading the troops burst through the crowd. The majority appear to have fled diagonally across the square, seeking the open ground of the Meadows. The wisdom of this against mounted troops is clearly dubious. Several bodies were found on the edge of the Meadows on the following morning.

That evening (6 June) a new mob assembled outside the house of Sir James Stirling, 1st Baronet (the then Lord Provost of Edinburgh) on the south-east corner of St Andrew Square in the New Town. A City Guard sentry box near the house was set upon and smashed to pieces. Edinburgh Castle, learning of the disturbance, lit a beacon fire on the half moon battery, and that signalled a beacon to be lit on Calton Hill. The pre-arranged signal allowed HMS Hind, moored in Leith Docks, to dispatch a company of marines into the city. Combining forces with cavalry troops from the castle, the mob dispersed. Provost Stirling had by then sought refuge in Edinburgh Castle. The local doctor Alexander Wood, was mistaken by the angry mob for Stirling and narrowly avoided being thrown off North Bridge due to the misunderstanding.

== Aftermath ==
The Edinburgh goldsmiths decried the actions of the mob in a public statement on 7 June. There followed a series of public declarations of loyalty of various trade halls, swearing loyalty to the constitution. At a meeting held from 11 to 13 December 1792, 170 representatives met at a hall in James Court off the Royal Mile, representing various Societies of Friends from across Scotland (aka the first Friends of the People Convention). Most notable of those present was Thomas Muir of Huntershill, a Glaswegian by birth, but then an Edinburgh lawyer. Divisions in public opinion began to appear, but the majority supported the old status quo. Muir was prosecuted the following year for his part in the convention and for being the Edinburgh publisher of Thomas Paine's then controversial book "The Rights of Man".

Although Thomas Muir of Huntershill is not named as one of the rioters in June, it is logical to presume he was either present or had encouraged the actions. Certainly Robert Dundas of Arniston is said to have remained in Edinburgh to watch those involved "like a hawk" and report to London his findings. Muir was the focus of all his attention, and given Dundas's position, Muir was then doomed. When Muir became trapped in Paris due to the outbreak of war he could not attend court as required, and was automatically outlawed by Dundas... ultimately being sent to Australia in punishment.

== Trivia ==
57 George Square bears a plaque, but to Benjamin Rush rather than Robert Dundas or the Dundas Riots. Rush was a student at the University of Edinburgh (which erected the plaque) but there is no known link between the building and Rush, whereas the true history of the building is ignored.
