= Brograve baronets of Hamells (1663) =

Escutcheon of the Brograve baronets of Hamells

The Brograve baronetcy, of Hamells in the County of Hertford, was created in the Baronetage of England on 18 March 1663 for Thomas Brograve. He was the son of John Brograve of Hammals, Braughing, and Albury, and his wife Hannah Barnardiston, daughter of Sir Thomas Barnardiston, and served as High Sheriff of Hertfordshire in 1664.

The title became extinct on the death of the 3rd Baronet in 1707.

== Brograve baronets, of Hamells (1663) ==
- Sir Thomas Brograve, 1st Baronet (died 1670)
- Sir John Brograve, 2nd Baronet (1664–1691)
- Sir Thomas Brograve, 3rd Baronet (1670–1707)
