= Brograve baronets =

Set index for Brograve baronets

There have been two baronetcies created for persons with the surname Brograve, one in the Baronetage of England and one in the Baronetage of Great Britain. Both creations are extinct.

- Brograve baronets of Hamells (1663)
- Brograve baronets of Worstead (1791)
