= Marina Boroditskaya =

Russian children's poet and translator

Marina Yakovlevna Boroditskaya
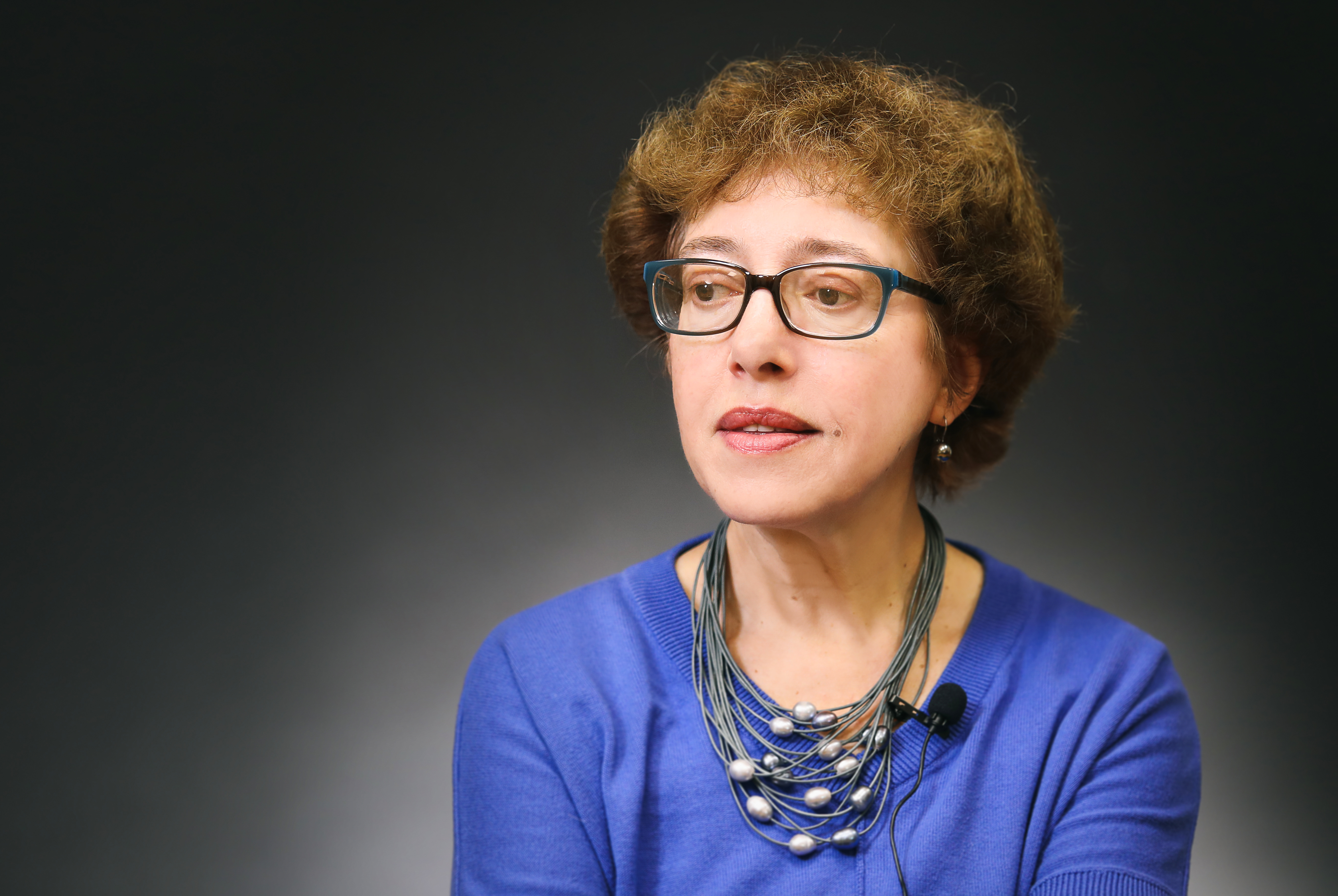
- Boroditskaya in 2017
- Born: 1954 (age 71–72); Moscow
- Education: Moscow State Pedagogical Institute of Foreign Languages
- Occupations: Children's Poet & Translator

Marina Yakovlevna Boroditskaya (Russian: Мари́на Я́ковлевна Бороди́цкая, IPA: [mɐˈrʲinə ˈjakəvlʲɪvnə bərɐˈdʲitskəjə]; born 1954) is a Russian children's poet and translator.

== Biography ==
Boroditskaya was born in Moscow. She graduated from the Moscow State Pedagogical Institute of Foreign Languages.

She is an author of three books of poetry, twelve books of poems for children and numerous translations of poems and fairy tales from English. Her translation of Alan Garner's The Weirdstone of Brisingamen and The Moon of Gomrath was honored by the British Culture Council.

She is also the lead of the "Literary Drugstore" program of the Radio of Russia (Радио России) station.
