= Thursbitch =

2003 novel by Alan Garner

- First edition cover
- Author: Alan Garner
- Language: English
- Genre: Fantasy novel
- Publisher: The Harvill Press
- Publication date: October 2003
- Publication place: United Kingdom
- Media type: Print (Hardback & Paperback)
- Pages: 160 p. (hardback edition)
- ISBN: 1-84343-087-8 (hardback edition)
- OCLC: 52622302
- Dewey Decimal: 823/.914 22
- LC Class: PR6057.A66 T49 2003

Thursbitch is a novel by English writer Alan Garner, named after the valley in the Pennines of England where the action occurs (also listed in the 1841 OS map as "Thursbatch"). It was published in 2003.

== Plot ==
Set both in the 18th century and the present day, the novel centres on the mystery of an inscription on an extant engraved wayside stone tablet about a death from exposure.

== Major themes ==
The book features shamanic use of the fly agaric mushroom and a piece of Derbyshire Blue John as plot elements.

== Literary significance and criticism ==
The book is seen by critics of Garner's work as a continuation of styles and structures first used in Red Shift (1973) and Strandloper (1996).
