= Lud's Church =

Rocky chasm in England's Peak District

- Chasm
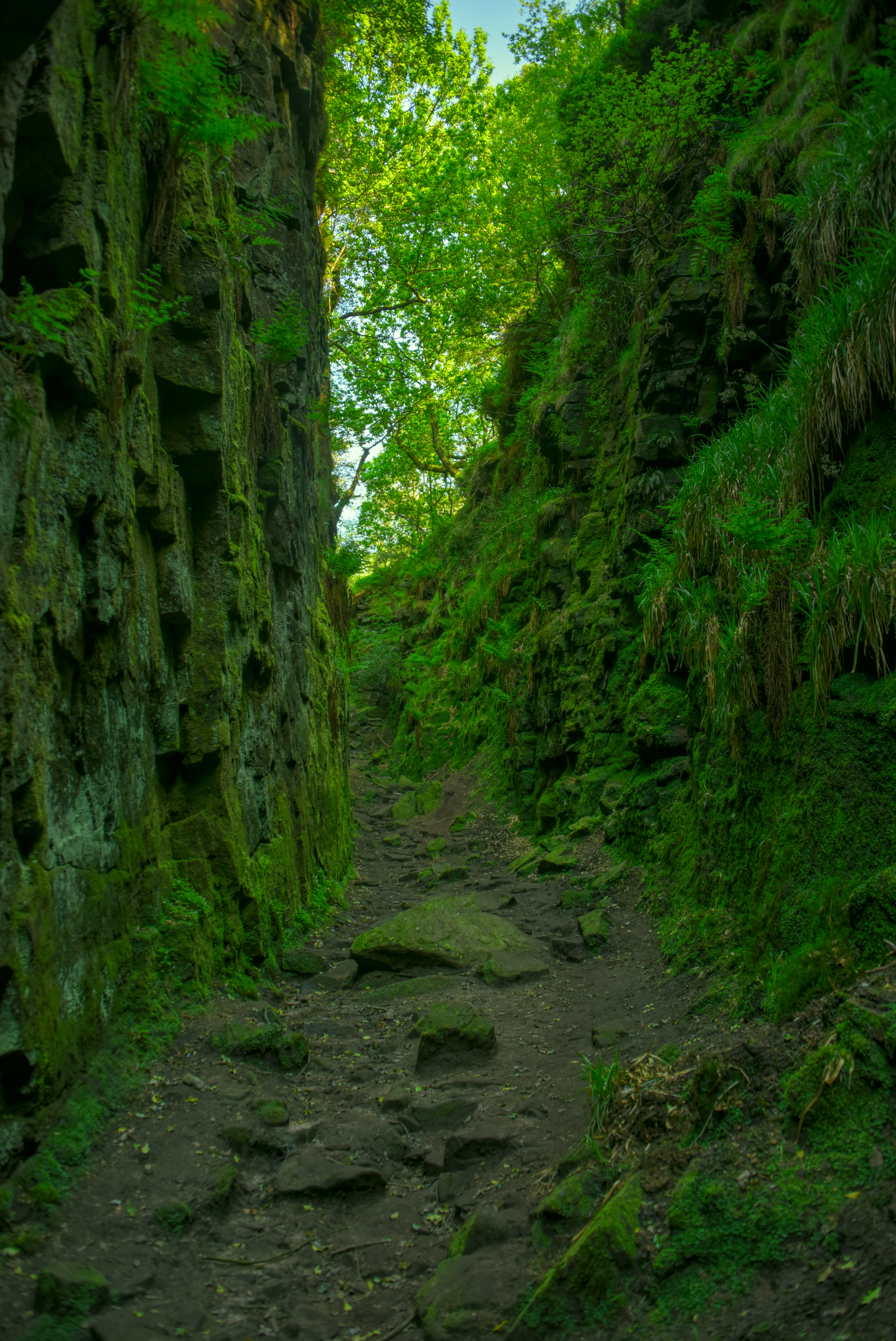
- Lud's Church

- Lud's Church within Staffordshire
- Coordinates: 53°11′16″N 2°1′14″W
- Grid position: SJ987656
- Location: Staffordshire Moorlands, Staffordshire, England
- Topo map: OS Outdoor Leisure OL24

Lud's Church (sometimes written as Ludchurch) is a deep chasm penetrating the Millstone Grit bedrock created by a massive landslip on the hillside above Gradbach, Staffordshire, England. It is located in a wood known as Back Forest, in the Dark Peak, towards the southwest fringe of the Peak District National Park about 2.5 miles (4.0 km) west of the A53 between Leek and Buxton. Over 100 metres (328 ft) long and 18 metres (59 ft) deep, all but the upper third of the slope has slipped forward towards the River Dane. It is mossy and overgrown, wet and cool even on the hottest of days.

== Geological origins ==
Lud's Church is formed within the thick bed of coarse Carboniferous sandstone known as the Roaches Grit which here dips northeastwards into the Goyt Syncline. The rocks of this area are traversed by numerous roughly northwest-to-southeast-oriented faults and fracture planes. In addition, weak layers of mudstone exist within the sequence. It is along such lines of weakness that a large mass of the Roaches Grit bounding the northeast side of the rift has slipped slightly downhill into the Dane Valley resulting in the open rift. The age of the movement is unknown but is likely to be post-glacial.

== History ==
The area has a place in Christian history: the Lollards, who were followers of John Wycliffe, an early church reformer, are supposed to have used this as a secret place of worship during the early 15th century, when they were being persecuted for their religious beliefs. Lud's Church may have been named after Walter de Ludank or Walter de Lud-Auk who was captured here at one of their meetings.

A wooden ship's figurehead from the ship Swythamley formerly stood in a high niche above the chasm, placed there by Philip Brocklehurst of nearby Swythamley Hall, then the landowner, around 1862. It was called 'Lady Lud' and was supposed to commemorate the death of the daughter of a Lollard preacher.

A number of climbing routes up the sides of the chasm were pioneered during the 20th century, but climbing is now discouraged to protect the lower plants that have colonised the damp rockfaces.

== In legend ==
Scholars spent many decades debating the dialect of the medieval poem Sir Gawain and the Green Knight. Shortly after they came to a consensus that the dialect was that of the North-West Midlands on the Staffordshire/Cheshire/Shropshire border, Lud’s Church in the Staffordshire Moorlands was suggested by R. W. V. Elliot as one of the key settings for the climax of the poem's story – "The Green Chapel" – in May 1958. Elliot went on to give a scholarly modern explication of most of the local landscape elements in a series of essays in scholarly journals. These various essays were later collected in his book in 1984. His general claim that "The Green Chapel" must be somewhere in this district was supported by other scholarly work suggesting the location as Nan Tor cave, above the former railway station at Wetton Mill.

== In fiction ==
Lud's Church / 'Ludcruck' is a location in Alan Garner's Boneland, the final book in the Weirdstone Trilogy. It is also the central location in the book Dark Peak by Marcus Sedgwick, which references the Sir Gawain legend.
