= Millway railway station =

Former railway station in England

Coordinates: 53.087666°N 2.328135°W

Millway

General information
- Location: Radway Green, Cheshire; England
- Grid reference: SJ781545
- Platforms: 2

Other information
- Status: Disused

History
- Original company: London, Midland and Scottish Railway

Key dates
- 1942: Opened as Mill Lane
- 1944: renamed Millway
- 5 January 1959: Closed
Location

Millway railway station was a short lived railway station built by the London, Midland and Scottish Railway to serve ROF Radway Green in Cheshire.

ROF Radway Green was opened in 1940 and was initially served by the nearby Radway Green & Barthomley railway station but a new station, consisting of an island platform, was constructed a few hundred yards east of Radway Green station to serve the factory directly. The station opened in 1942 and was initially as Mill Lane, in 1944 it was renamed Millway, a name it retained until closure in 1959.

At its peak, in 1944, the station was served by 11 passenger trains a day bringing workers from, and returning them to various parts of Stoke-on-Trent and Macclesfield.
