= Boroditsky =

Boroditsky (Russian: Бородицкий) is a Slavic masculine surname, its feminine counterpart is Boroditskaya. It may refer to:

- Lera Boroditsky (born c. 1976), Belarusian-American cognitive scientist
- Marina Boroditskaya (born 1954), Russian children's poet and translator
