= Shutlingsloe =

Hill in Cheshire, England

Coordinates: 53.22321°N 2.03673°W

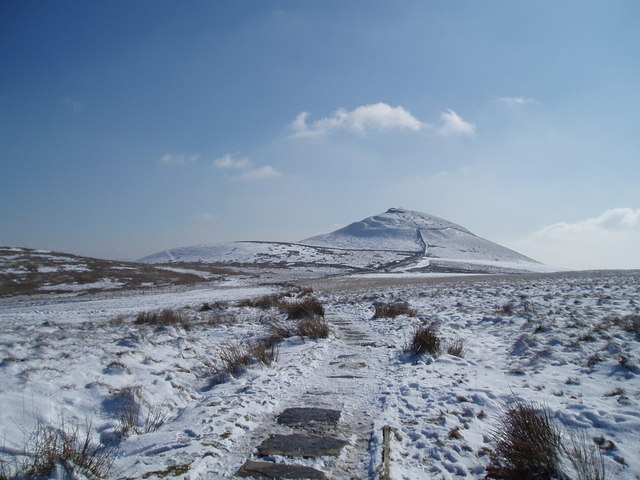
- Shutlingsloe from Macclesfield Forest path

Highest point
- Elevation: 506 m (1,660 ft)
- Prominence: c. 134 m
- Listing: none

Geography
- Location: Cheshire, England
- Parent range: Peak District
- OS grid: SJ976695
- Topo map: OS Outdoor Leisure 24

Shutlingsloe is a hill near the village of Wildboarclough, in the east of the county of Cheshire. It stands to the south of Macclesfield Forest, on the edge of the Peak District and within the Peak District National Park.

It is a steep-sided hill with a distinctive profile and commands excellent views over Cheshire. Sometimes described as the 'Matterhorn of Cheshire' it is the third highest peak in the historic county, Shining Tor being the highest at 559 m (1,660 ft). The Peak District Boundary Walk crosses the summit, which is the highest point on the footpath's 200-mile long route.

The name derives from old English 'Scyttel's hlaw' meaning 'Scyttel's (personal name) hill' and is one of several 'low' names in the Peak District, from the same Old English root that gives rise to the name "Law" for many hills in southern Scotland.

== Geology ==
The hill is formed from alternating layers of mudstones and coarse sandstones (referred to as 'gritstones' or simply 'grits') which were laid down in a delta system in the Carboniferous period. The summit tor is formed from the Chatsworth Grit and the lower slopes from the Roaches Grit. Several geological faults run northwest to southeast through the hill.

== In fiction ==
In The Weirdstone of Brisingamen, a work for children by Alan Garner, 'Shuttlingslow' features in the climax of the chase at the end of the story.
