= Mow Cop Castle =

Folly on the border of Cheshire and Staffordshire, England

Coordinates: 53.1130°N 2.2143°W

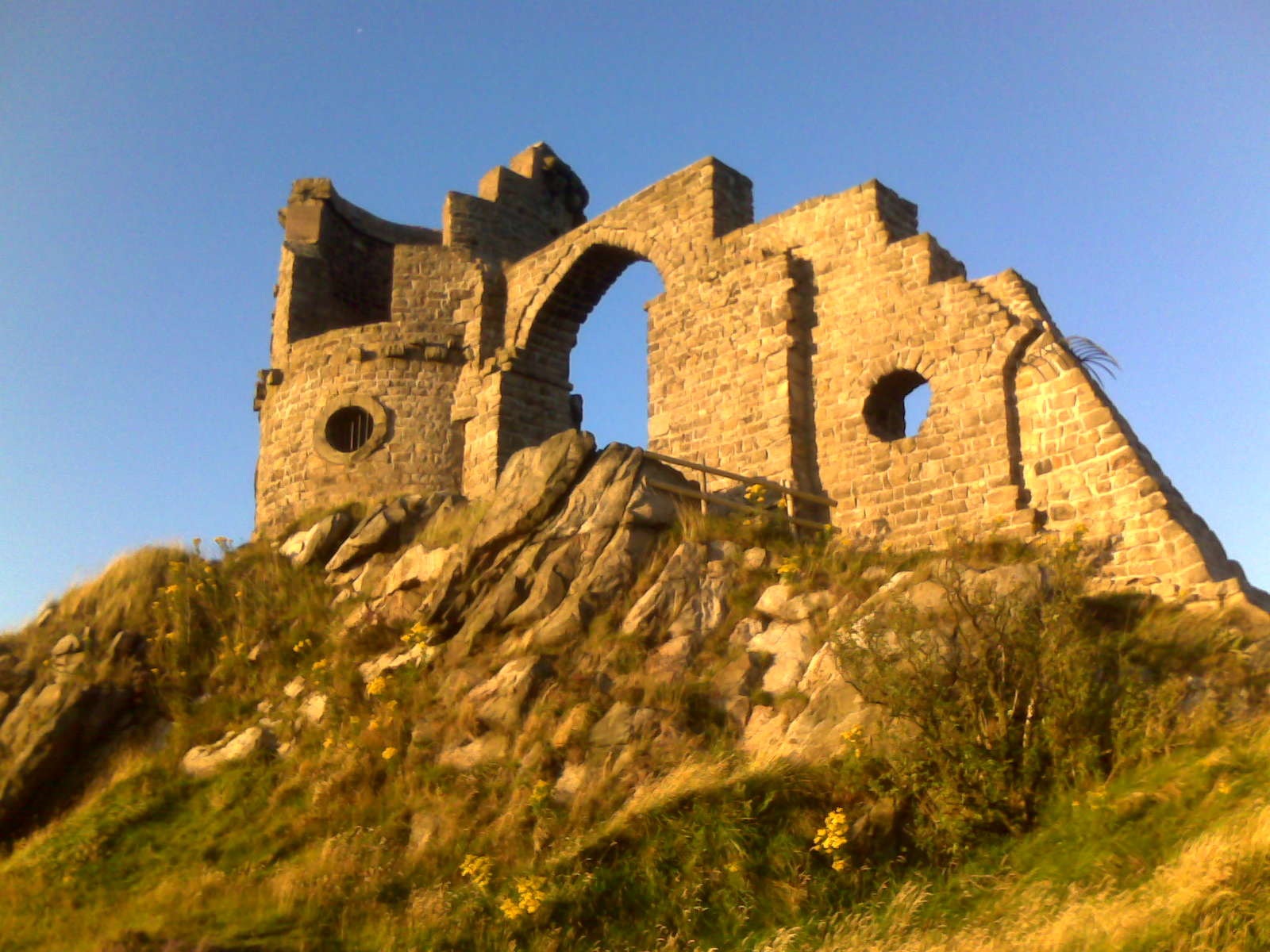
Mow Cop Castle at sunset

Mow Cop Castle is a folly at Mow Cop in the civil parish of Odd Rode, Cheshire, England. It is designated as a Grade II listed building on the National Heritage List for England. The ridge, upon which the castle sits, forms the boundary between the counties of Cheshire and Staffordshire, the dioceses of Chester and Lichfield, and the ecclesiastical provinces of Canterbury and York.

== History ==
Built by Randle Wilbraham of nearby Rode Hall in 1754 as a folly, it was designed to resemble medieval ruins. Wilbraham constructed the elaborate summerhouse and circular tower to look like medieval fortress ruins.

The area around the castle was nationally famous for the quarrying of high-quality millstones, querns, for use in water mills. Excavations at Mow Cop have found querns dating back to the Iron Age. Traces of a prehistoric camp have also been found here.

The castle was given to the National Trust in 1937. That year, over 10,000 Methodists met on the hill to commemorate the first Primitive Methodist camp, which met there in 1807.

At the turn of the millennium, on New Year's Eve 1999, Mow Cop was a location for one of the hundreds of flaming beacons across the UK that were lit to mark the new century.

Though visitors were originally allowed inside the tower of the folly, access is now prevented by a locked metal gate, which still allows views inside the folly.

Mow Cop and its folly are central images in Alan Garner's novel Red Shift.

== See also ==
- Listed buildings in Kidsgrove
- Listed buildings in Odd Rode
