= The Stone Book Quartet =

Series of novels by Alan Garner

First edition of First book (publ. William Collins, Sons)

The Stone Book Quartet, or Stone Book series, is a set of four short novels by Alan Garner and published by William Collins, Sons, from 1976 to 1978. Set in eastern Cheshire, they feature one day each in the life of four generations of Garner's family and they span more than a century.

In a 1989 interview he called them "four very short novels which hang together as one work, called The Stone Book Quartet, where again I write about Alderley Edge, luminously but not magically." The allusion is to The Weirdstone of Brisingamen and its sequels (1960, 1963, 2012), which concern the locale of Alderley Edge, although not the village itself. ISFDB calls them the Alderley series. In the same interview he called the work "exhausting" but "the most rewarding of everything" he'd done to date.

The four books were first published by Collins in hardcover editions of 270 pages in sum.

1. The Stone Book (1976, ISBN 0-00-184777-5)
2. Tom Fobble's Day (1977, 0-00-184832-1) — the last of four in narrative sequence
3. Granny Reardun (1977, 0-00-184288-9)
4. The Aimer Gate (1978, 0-00-184067-3)

One year after The Aimer Gate, Collins published a 172-page omnibus entitled The Stone Book Quartet (1979, 9780006551515) and subsequent editions have retained the title.

The narrative sequence is The Stone Book, Granny Reardun, The Aimer Gate, and Tom Fobble's Day.

The series is named for The Stone Book (1976), both the first published and the earliest in narrative sequence. In a time when the main trade is stonemason, Mary requests a book from her father and he makes one out of stone as he does not believe books and formal education are valuable. The story won the 1996 Phoenix Award from the Children's Literature Association as the best English-language children's book that did not gain a major award when it was originally published twenty years earlier. It is named for the mythical bird phoenix, which is reborn from its ashes, to suggest the book's rise from obscurity.

While seemingly in modern English, the language of the book is poetic and draws on the patterns and rhythms of local Cheshire dialect. Garner's great grandfather was a stonemason, and The Stone Book describes his initiating his daughter into the secrets of his craft high on the steeple of a church he is helping to build. When she asks for a book, he shows her an older writing – his own stonemason's emblem carved in rock deep within Alderley Edge and dating back countless centuries.

Among Garner's works, The Stone Book is the tenth most widely held (catalogued) in WorldCat participating libraries.
