= Barthomley =

Civil parish in Cheshire

Coordinates: 53.068147°N 2.348657°W

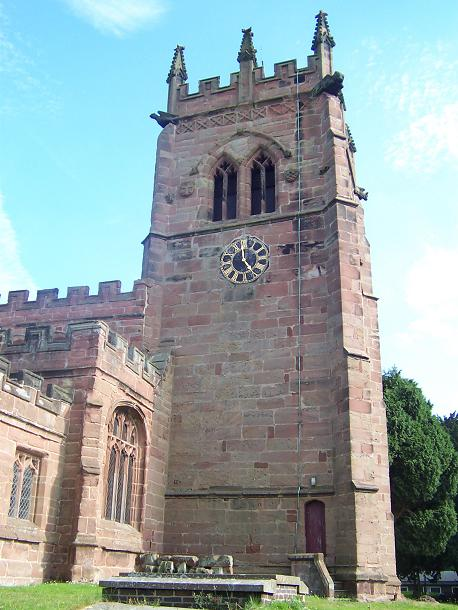
- St Bertoline's Church

- Location within Cheshire
- Population: 202 (2001 & 2011)
- OS grid reference: SJ767523
- Civil parish: Barthomley
- Unitary authority: Cheshire East
- Ceremonial county: Cheshire
- Region: North West
- Country: England
- Sovereign state: United Kingdom
- Post town: CREWE
- Postcode district: CW2
- Dialling code: 01270
- Police: Cheshire
- Fire: Cheshire
- Ambulance: North West
- UK Parliament: Crewe and Nantwich

Barthomley is a village and ancient parish, and is now a civil parish in the unitary authority of Cheshire East and the ceremonial county of Cheshire, England. According to the 2001 and the 2011 census, the parish had a population of 202, rising to 218 in 2021 (106 female; 112 male). The village is situated near junction 16 of the M6 motorway and by the border with Staffordshire. It is about three miles south-west of Alsager.

The hamlet of Radway Green, location of a Royal Ordnance Factory, is within the parish, north-east of the village of Barthomley and just outside Alsager. There was a railway station in Radway Green, on the Crewe to Derby Line, as well as a station reserved for the factory at Millway. However, both of these are now closed. Radway Green and Barthomley station closed to goods traffic on 7 June 1964, followed by its closure to passengers on 7 November 1966.

== History ==
Barthomley was an ancient parish within Cheshire. It contained five townships: Alsager, Balterley, Barthomley itself, Crewe, and Haslington. Of these, Balterley township and (now) civil parish was and is entirely in the neighbouring county of Staffordshire, and Crewe was later renamed Crewe Green to avoid confusion with the neighbouring unparished borough and railway town. All five townships were made separate civil parishes in 1866.

The Cheshire part of the ancient parish lay within Nantwich Hundred, Nantwich Poor Law Union, and Nantwich Rural Sanitary District, whilst the Staffordshire part lay in North Pirehill hundred, Newcastle under Lyme Poor Law Union and Rural Sanitary District. Later on, the modern civil parish (now entirely in Cheshire) was part of Nantwich Rural District.

During the English Civil War St Bertoline's Church was the location of a notorious massacre of at least 12 pro-Parliamentarian prisoners by Royalist troops. The fantasy novel Red Shift, by Alan Garner, is largely concerned with the Barthomley massacre.

There was also a medieval Knights Hospitaller Chapel at Barthomley. It was located behind the White Lion public house and over the brook, where in the past a field named 'Chapel Field' existed.

== Landmarks ==
Pevsner describes Barthomley as "[a] pretty village, with a number of black and white houses and cottages, C17..., but mostly C19, and built for the Crewe estate". The village has two main landmarks: the White Lion public house and the parish church of St Bertoline, which are close together in the centre.

=== White Lion ===
The White Lion is a half-timbered, thatched building dated 1614. It is a Grade II* listed building, and included in CAMRA's register of Historic Pub Interiors.

=== St Bertoline's Church ===
Barthomley is thought to be the only church in England dedicated to St Bertoline. Its earliest feature is a Norman doorway, and other important remnants include a fine Perpendicular roof and some effigies in the Crewe Chapel.

== Governance ==
From 1974 the civil parish was served by Crewe and Nantwich Borough Council, which was succeeded on 1 April 2009 by the new unitary authority of Cheshire East. Barthomley falls in the parliamentary constituency of Crewe and Nantwich.

== See also ==
- Listed buildings in Barthomley

== Bibliography ==
- Scholes, R. (2000) Towns and Villages of Britain: Cheshire. Sigma Press: Wilmslow, Cheshire. ISBN 1-85058-637-3.
- Speake, R. (Ed.) (1995). Barthomley: The Story of an Estate Village. Keele, Staffs.: Barthomley Local History Group and Department of Adult and Continuing Education, Keele University. ISBN 0-903160-33-1.
- Youngs, F. A. (1991). Guide to the Local Administrative Units of England. Volume I: Northern England. London: Royal Historical Society. ISBN 0-86193-127-0.
