= Listed buildings in Barthomley =

Barthomley is a civil parish in Cheshire East, England. It contains 15 buildings that are recorded in the National Heritage List for England as designated listed buildings. Of these, one is listed at Grade I, the highest grade, two are listed at Grade II*, the middle grade, and the others are at Grade II. Apart from the villages of Barthomley and Englesea Brook, the parish is entirely rural. Most of the listed buildings are houses or farmhouses, many being timber-framed and dating from the 17th century. The exception are a church, a public house, and a former smithy.

== Key ==
Grade	Criteria
I	Buildings of exceptional interest, sometimes considered to be internationally important
II*	Particularly important buildings of more than special interest
II	Buildings of national importance and special interest

== Buildings ==
Name and location	Photograph	Date	Notes	Grade
St Bertoline's Church; 53.0681°N 2.3483°W		Late 15th century	The nave and tower date from the late 15th century. The chancel was built in 1925–26 by Austin and Paley who inserted a 12th-century doorway in the north wall. The church is in Perpendicular style. The tower has a crenellated parapet with gargoyles and crocketed pinnacles. In the Crewe Chapel are monuments dating from the 14th century onwards, including one of 1887 by Joseph Boehm.	I
The White Lion Inn; 53.06860°N 2.34826°W		1614	A public house partly timber-framed with brick nogging, and partly in brick, with a thatched roof. It consists of a hall with a cross-wing. The building is in two storeys, with a two-bay front, two bays on the sides, and a later addition to the rear. The windows are mullioned and contain casements. Inside the building is an inglenook.	II*
Bank Cottage; 53.06937°N 2.34840°W		Early 17th century	Originally a pair of cottages, later converted into a single dwelling, it is timber-framed on a brick plinth with brick nogging and a tiled roof. It is in a single storey, and has a three-bay front. The gables are mainly in brick. The windows are casements. There are two gabled dormers with bargeboards.	II
Churchfield Farmhouse; 53.07078°N 2.35390°W		Early 17th century	The farmhouse is built in brick with a timber-framed core. It has a tiled roof, is in two storeys, and has a three-bay gabled front. Originally with an L-shaped plan, a rear wing was added later. The windows are casements. Inside the building is an inglenook and exposed timber framing.	II*
Fir Tree Cottages; 53.06822°N 2.35280°W		Early 17th century	A row of three timber-framed cottages with roofs that are partly thatched, and partly tiled. They are in a single storey with attics, and each cottage has a two-bay front. The right cottage has a gable facing the road, giving the whole building an L-shaped plan. Across the front of the cottages is a verandah with a tiled roof. The windows are casements, those in the attics being in gabled dormers.	II
Mill Farmhouse; 53.07838°N 2.35448°W		Early 17th century	A farmhouse that is timber-framed with brick nogging on a brick plinth. It has a south gable in brick, a tiled roof, and is in a single storey with an attic. There is a rear wing, giving it an L-shaped plan. The windows are casements, those in the upper storey being in gabled dormers with carved bargeboards and finials. Inside the farmhouse is an inglenook.	II
White Lion Cottages; 53.06895°N 2.34798°W		Early 17th century	Originally one dwelling, this has been divided into two cottages. The front is timber-framed with brick nogging, the side gables are in brick, and at the rear is a 20th-century brick lean-to extension. The cottages have a tiled roof, are in a single storey with an attic, and have a two-bay front. The windows are casements, the window in the attic being in a gabled dormer with bargeboards.	II
Cherry Tree Farmhouse; 53.07325°N 2.34170°W	—	Late 17th century	A timber-framed farmhouse with plastered brick nogging and a tiled roof. It is in a single storey with an attic, and has a later wing extending to the rear. The entrance front is in three bays. The windows are casements with lattice glazing, those in the attic being in gabled dormers.	II
Old Hall Farmhouse; 53.06735°N 2.35564°W		Late 17th century	The farmhouse has a timber-framed lower storey, and an upper storey in brick with applied timber. The roof is tiled, the house has two storeys, and a three-bay front, with a two-bay extension to the right. It has a timber-framed gabled porch with carved bargeboards and a finial. The casement windows have lozenge glazing.	II
Church Bank; 53.06836°N 2.34953°W		1708	A brick house with applied timber, and a gabled tiled roof, it is in two storeys with a three-bay front. A later addition to the rear has given it an L-shaped plan. Its features include mullioned and transomed casement windows, dormers with bargeboards, and chimneys with separated diagonal flues.	II
Manor Farmhouse; 53.06099°N 2.37075°W		Early 18th century	A farmhouse in rendered brick with a tiled roof. It is in two storeys, with a T-shaped plan, and has a front of three bays, with a later bay added on the right. The windows are casements, those in the upper floor being in gabled dormers. The later bay has a semicircular bow window with a conical roof.	II
Town House Farmhouse; 53.06657°N 2.36787°W	—	Early 18th century	The farmhouse was remodelled in 1874 by the Crewe Estate. It is built in brick and has a slate roof with a tiled ridge. The house is in three storeys, and the main block has a front of four bays. There is also a two-storey three-bay wing giving the building an L-shaped plan. On the front is a timber-framed gabled porch with the Crewe Estate emblem in the apex. The windows are casements.	II
Old Rectory; 53.06790°N 2.34731°W	—	Late 18th century	The former rectory is built in brick with a slate roof. It is in two storeys with a basement, and has a six-bay front. The windows are sashes. In the southwest corner is a large semicircular bay window. There is a four-stage tower with a hipped roof in the northeast corner.	II
Smithy; 53.06784°N 2.35508°W		Mid-19th century	The former smithy was later used for light engineering. It is built in brick with a tiled roof, and is in a single storey with an attic. It has a two-bay front, with a single-storey, one-bay extension to the left. There is also a rear wing, giving it a T-shaped plan. The windows are casements, including one in a gabled dormer.	II
Brookside Cottage; 53.06881°N 2.34865°W		Late 19th century	This originated as a shop with an attached cottage, and has been converted into a single dwelling. It is in brick with timber applied to the upper storey. The house is in two storeys with a three-bay front, and two bays on the side. The centre bay projects forward under a gable containing an oriel window. Elsewhere there are mullioned and transomed windows.	II
