= Radway Green & Barthomley railway station =

Former railway station in England

Coordinates: 53.085507°N 2.335375°W

Radway Green & Barthomley

General information
- Location: Radway Green, Cheshire; England
- Grid reference: SJ776543
- Platforms: 2

Other information
- Status: Disused

History
- Original company: North Staffordshire Railway
- Post-grouping: London, Midland and Scottish Railway; British Railways (London Midland region)

Key dates
- 9 October 1848: Opened as Radway Green
- 1909–1910: renamed Radway Green & Barthomley
- 6 July 1964: Closed to Goods
- 7 November 1966: Closed to Passengers
Location

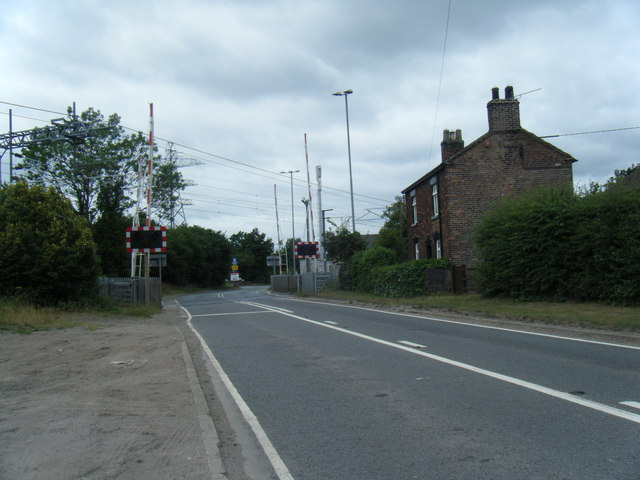
Level crossing at the former station (2010)

Radway Green & Barthomley railway station was a railway station in Cheshire, England, from 1848 to 1966. It was built by the North Staffordshire Railway (NSR) and served the villages of Barthomley, Oakhanger and Radway Green. Located on the NSR line between Crewe and Kidsgrove it was the first station on the route from Crewe.

During the Second World War the station was the terminating point for many trains transporting workers to and from the nearby ROF Radway Green. This situation continued until a new station, Millway was built at the factory in 1942.
