= The Owl Service =

1967 young adult novel by Alan Garner

- First edition
- Author: Alan Garner
- Language: English
- Genre: Young adult fantasy novel, horror, supernatural fiction
- Publisher: William Collins, Sons
- Publication date: 1967
- Publication place: United Kingdom
- Media type: Print (hardback & paperback)
- Pages: 156 pp (first edition)
- ISBN: 0001846035
- OCLC: 156462103
- LC Class: PZ7.G18417 Ow

The Owl Service is a low fantasy novel for young adults by Alan Garner, published by Collins in 1967. Set in modern Wales, it is an adaptation of the story of the mythical Welsh woman Blodeuwedd, an "expression of the myth" in the author's words.

Garner won the annual Carnegie Medal from the Library Association, recognising the year's best children's book by a British author. It was named one of the top ten Medal-winning works for the 70th anniversary celebration in 2007, selected by a panel to compose the ballot for a public election of the all-time favourite. Garner also won the second annual Guardian Children's Fiction Prize, a similar award that authors may not win twice. Only six books have won both awards in the 45 years from 1966 to 2011. (Note: Alternatively, six authors have won the Carnegie Medal for their Guardian Prize-winning books. Professional librarians confer the Carnegie and select the winner from all British children's books. The Guardian newspaper's prize winner is selected by British children's writers, "peers" of the author who has not yet won it, for one children's (age 7+) or young-adult fiction book. Details regarding author and publisher nationality have varied.)

The mythical Blodeuwedd is featured in the Fourth Branch of the Mabinogi. She is a woman created from flowers by the king of Gwynedd, Math, and the magician and trickster Gwydion, for a man who was cursed to take no human wife. She betrays her husband Lleu in favour of another man, Gronw, and is turned into an owl as punishment for inducing Gronw to kill Lleu. In Garner's tale three teenagers find themselves re-enacting the story. They awaken the legend by finding plates from a dinner service with an owl pattern, which gives the novel its title.

Henry Z. Walck published the first US edition in 1968.

== Characters ==
- Alison
- Roger
- Gwyn
- Huw Halfbacon
- Clive (Roger's father)
- Margaret (Alison's mother, mentioned but never seen)
- Nancy (Gwyn's mother)
- Bertram (Alison's deceased cousin, mentioned)
- Blodeuwedd (Welsh mythical figure)
- Lleu Llaw Gyffes (Welsh mythical figure)
- Gronw Pebyr (Welsh mythical figure)

== Plot summary ==
Roger and Alison are stepbrother and sister. Alison's father died and her mother Margaret has married Clive, a businessman and former RAF officer. Clive's former wife was notoriously unfaithful, bringing shame to the family and a particular kind of pain to his son, Roger. To bond the new family together they are spending a few weeks of the summer in an isolated valley in Wales, a few hours' drive from Aberystwyth. They occupy a fine house formerly owned by Alison's father, subsequently transferred to her to avoid death duty. He in turn inherited it from a cousin, Bertram, who died there in mysterious circumstances around the time Alison was born.

With the house comes Huw Halfbacon, also known as Huw the Flitch, a handyman and gardener. He is the last of the original domestic staff to remain at the house. The former cook, Nancy, had left to live in Aberystwyth but is offered a substantial amount to come and resume her duties. With her comes her son Gwyn. He has never seen the valley before but knows everything about it, courtesy of his mother's stories. Someone else who knows a lot about the place is Huw, but he is very mysterious about it. Oddly, Nancy has told Gwyn nothing about Huw.

Alison hears scratching noises in the attic above her bed and persuades Gwyn to investigate. He finds stacks of dinner plates with a floral pattern. When he picks one up, something odd happens. He almost falls through the ceiling while simultaneously Roger, lounging by a large flat stone near the river, hears a scream and seems to see something flying through the air toward him. The stone is known as the Stone of Gronw. It has a hole neatly bored through it, and legend says that Lleu killed Gronw by throwing his spear clear through the stone that Gronw was holding to shield himself.

Alison begins behaving peculiarly. She traces the pattern on the plate onto paper and folds the result to make an owl. Finding out that Gwyn has been in the attic, Nancy demands that Alison give up the plate. Alison asserts she has no right to it, and eventually produces a blank white plate. She maintains that the pattern disappeared from the plate. Alison becomes obsessed by the plates. One by one she traces them and makes the owls, and one by one the plates become blank. The owls themselves disappear, though no one cares at first about some folded paper models.

In the house's billiard room part of the wall has been covered with pebble-dash. Bit by bit this begins to crack and fall away, exposing first a pair of painted eyes, and then an entire portrait of a woman made of flowers. Tensions between the occupants of the house begin to rise. Gwyn is intelligent and wants to further his education, but Clive expresses the stereotypical clannish closed-ranks attitudes of the upper middle class towards him. Roger begins to feel hostile despite his initial friendliness. Eventually he takes to ridiculing Gwyn's efforts to improve himself with elocution lessons on gramophone records, calling them "improve-a-prole." Alison seems friendly to Gwyn and the two go on long walks together. She has visions where she sees herself next to him, even though he is some distance away. Margaret, her mother, never appears but the need to keep her happy affects everyone else.

As the holiday slides into disaster, the British attitude of "seeing it through to the end" prevails, even though Clive could pay off all the staff and leave at any time. Nancy repeatedly threatens to quit, and is repeatedly mollified with crisp banknotes. She constantly warns Gwyn to stay away from the others, lest he be taken out of school and forced to work in a shop to earn some money. Nancy gradually reveals her resentment of Margaret and Alison, as she once expected to marry Bertram and should have been mistress of the very house she toils in.

Competition between the boys for Alison is, at most, a subtext here, although Garner's television script is much more overt about Gwyn's attraction to her, despite his poverty. Alison, notwithstanding any attraction to him, would rather keep her privileges, such as her tennis club membership, than cross her mother. This is something she eventually admits to Gwyn.

The mysterious Huw presides over this like some ringmaster at a circus, making strange pronouncements. There is a background of odd comments from the villagers, noises of motorcycles in the distance, sounds of birds, and mysterious noises from locked buildings.

Gwyn follows Alison on one of her inexplicable midnight walks. She is completing her tracing of the plates somewhere in the woods. Gwyn is harassed by columns of flame, which he tries to convince himself are merely marsh gas. He finds Alison when she has made the final owl, then escorts her back to the house. Huw is waiting, and greets them with the remark "She's come."

By this time the connection between the legend and the events is becoming clear. Gwyn tries to see things rationally. He attempts to run away, walking up the sides of the valley as the weather worsens, but is chased back by a pack of sheepdogs. Stealing Roger's hiking gear, he tries the other side of the valley, only to find Huw waiting for him. Huw tells him of the power that exists in the valley, how those of the blood have to re-enact the legend each time, and how Blodeuwedd always comes as owls instead of flowers because of the hatred. Huw, of course, is Gwyn's real father, so Gwyn is the next generation. Huw was responsible for Bertram's death, sabotaging the old motorcycle Bertram liked to ride around the garden, not realising he would take it out on the dangerous hill road. The dinner plates and the wall painting were done by Huw's ancestors, trying to lock up the magic in their creations, but Alison has let it loose again.

Huw directs Gwyn to a crack in an ancient tree where he finds various things, including a spear head. All the men of Huw's line come to this tree, where they leave something and take something. Gwyn removes a carved stone, leaving a cheap owl-decorated trinket. He tells Huw to give the stone to Alison. Gwyn is going to return to the house and leave with his mother, who has finally and irrevocably quit.

In a locked room, Roger discovers a stuffed owl, which Bertram shot in his own attempt to lay the ghost of Blodeuwedd, along with all the paper owls that have traced intricate patterns in the dust of a storeroom. He also finds the sabotaged motorcycle. Nancy charges in and wrecks the place, destroying the owl and then attempting to knock the very feathers out of the air.

Alison, having been given the stone by Huw, collapses and is brought into the kitchen, where she writhes in the grip of some force that makes claw marks on her skin. Huw begs Gwyn to comfort her, but Gwyn by now feels totally betrayed by Alison and can say nothing. A storm rages outside, branches smashing through the windows and skylight, a sound of owls and eagles pressing in on them. Feathers swirl in the room and trace owl patterns on the walls and ceiling.

Roger is desperate, abasing himself before Gwyn, but to no avail. "It is always owls, over and over and over," says Huw. Then Roger shouts that it's not true, that she is flowers. He yells this at Alison until abruptly all is peaceful, and the room is filled not with feathers but with petals.

== Writing ==
Garner spent four years researching and writing the book. He learned Welsh "in order not to use it" in the dialogue—nor to use dialect, as in what he calls the "Come you here, bach" school of writing—because he believed that doing so would only superficially express what it is to be Welsh.

== Themes ==
John Rowe Townsend cited the theme of ancient but living legend, which also appears in Garner's earlier books, saying that in this book "Garner added to his gift for absorbing old tales and retransmitting them with increased power a new grasp of the inward, emotional content of an incident or situation."

Another fellow reteller of Welsh material in English, Susan Cooper said that the novel can be called "true fantasy", "subtle and overwhelming". Penelope Farmer wrote, "I doubt if you could find any piece of realistic fiction for adolescents that says a quarter as much about adolescence as Alan Garner's The Owl Service."

Gillian Polack notes that although “Alan Garner doesn’t explore the Middle Ages deeply in The Owl Service”, he deftly utilises “one small legend to build a modern study of class and personality” which indicates that “where you come from and what opportunities your life gives you can open and close life choices”.

== Inspiration ==
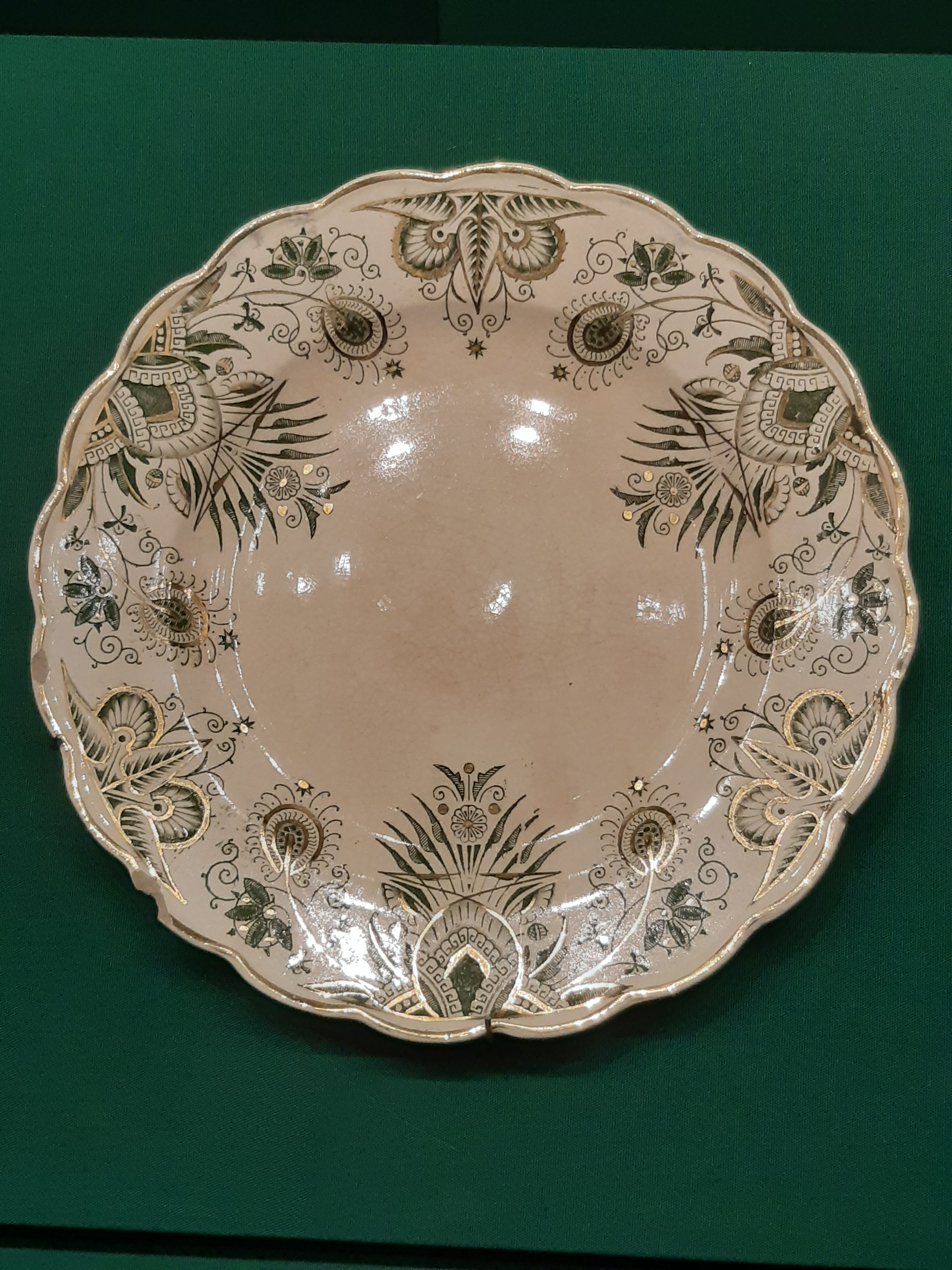
A plate from the Old Hall dinner service which served as inspiration to Alan Garner

According to his Postscript included in the 2017 HarperCollins (London) edition, pp216–219, Garner had "The sensation of finding, not inventing, a story .... It was all there, waiting, and I was the archaeologist picking away the earth to reveal the bones". He described 4 key inspirations leading to, and directly providing key elements of, the story, in both book and video forms.

First, (p216)

It began when I read an old Welsh legend about Lleu, and his wife Blodeuwedd who was made for him out of flowers.

Second, (p217)

The legend stuck in my mind for several years, and then one day my mother-in-law showed me an old dinner service. She had noticed that the floral pattern round the edge of the plates could be seen as the body, wings, and head of an owl. My wife, Griselda, traced the pattern, juggled it a bit, folded the pattern together and there it was, a model paper owl, which she perched on the back of a chair.

Third, (p217)

But even so, for a long time nothing else would come. Then, by chance, we went to stay at a house in a remote valley in North Wales. Within hours of arriving I knew that I had found the setting for the story, or the setting had found me. Its atmosphere fitted both the original legend and the nature of the dinner service. Ideas began to grow. [...] The story took shape. I looked around for more ideas. The lie of the land fitted the descriptions in the legend. Everything was where it ought to be. The legend could have happened here. As I stood on the doorstep at night, thinking these things, an owl brushed its wings in my face.

Fourth, he cited a local's key contribution: (pp217–218)

Dafydd Rees was eighty-one years old. He was known in the valley as Clocydd, "bell-ringer", because he had rung the church bell for sixty-five years, after his uncle retired from the same job after seventy years. Dafydd had worked as the caretaker and gardener of the house since 1898. He was the greatest help to me, since he let me in to his knowledge of the valley, its history, its traditions, its folklore. Everything that Gwyn, in the book, tells Alison about the valley, is what Dafydd told me. [...]

In its re-telling in video form, Garner described (p219) the later making of the television series, filmed in the valley itself, as "a kind of magical madness", saying it "had made the story...more real than reality".

I found the experience hard to bear, because characters —who had lived in my head for so many years— were now really in the valley and really speaking the words that I had written. What had been a thought was now happening in front of me.

The abrupt and entire removing of crew, kit, and actors left him with mixed emotions and he closed with:

For me, in the valley where I had set the story, it was a sense of loss. The valley had not changed. It was as it had been before I ever knew it. For a few hectic weeks my thoughts had taken on shapes, and moved as people in the landscape where I had imagined them. But now they had gone, and all was as it had always been.
"It was a good time," Dafydd wrote in a letter afterwards. "I have been to the stone. She is lonely now."

=== The dinner service ===
The pattern of the dinner service, a floral design in which some "flowers" can be read as "owls" when upside down, was designed for Old Hall by Christopher Dresser (died 1904). Garner sought to identify the designer for more than forty years.

Peter Plummer, the producer and director of the television adaptation, described in 1979 a nationwide search for surviving dinner services with the same owl/flower pattern, conducted in association with TV Times during 1969:

"I only know now that there are precious few of these sets in circulation ... (we) only managed to turn up three other copies, one of which, curiously enough, had been accompanied by very unpleasant associations of disaster in the family which had owned it (and one of the other families suddenly woke up to what it was they were eating their tea off while watching the transmission of the first episode)."

In 2012 Garner mentioned that he had only ever seen five plates with the design.

== Television adaptation ==
The Owl Service was made into a Granada Television television serial of the same name in 1969. It was dramatised first by ABC-FM Australia in circa 1987 then for BBC Radio 4 in 2000.

== Notes ==
Awards
Preceded by The Grange at High Force	Carnegie Medal recipient 1967	Succeeded by The Moon in the Cloud
