= Strandloper (novel) =

1996 novel by Alan Garner

- Cover of the first edition
- Author: Alan Garner
- Language: English
- Genre: Historical novel
- Publisher: The Harvill Press
- Publication date: May 1996
- Publication place: United Kingdom
- Media type: Print (Hardback & Paperback)
- Pages: 199 pp (hardback edition) & 208 pp (paperback edition)
- ISBN: 1-86046-160-3 (hardback edition) & ISBN 1-86046-161-1 (paperback edition)
- OCLC: 35113032
- Dewey Decimal: 823/.914 21
- LC Class: PR6057.A66 S77 1996

Strandloper is a novel by English writer Alan Garner, published in 1996. It is loosely based on the story of a Cheshire labourer, William Buckley. The historical figures of Edward Stanley and John Batman also appear as characters. An English epileptic is transported to Australia, where he escapes and becomes the holy man of the Beingalite people. Many years later he returns to England, and walks his home landscapes like an Aboriginal. Reaching the village church, he smears his body with clay and performs a spirit dance.

Critics found the book private, idiosyncratic, and difficult; Jenny Turner admired its Buntingesque construction but disliked its biblical tone. The Tolkien scholar Jason Fisher likened it to a baptism of folklore that demanded work from the reader, but found that worth the effort.

== Plot ==
In 1803, a farmer's son from Cheshire, William Buckley, participates in folk rituals which coexist with the local Christian church. An epileptic, William is prone to visions which contain patterns. He is being taught to read by the son of a local land-owner, Edward Stanley, who sees him as both friend and test subject. Both men have a close relationship with William’s fiancée, Esther. Edward’s father, Sir John, sees working-class literacy and community rituals as threats, and gets William convicted on a charge of trespass. William is transported to Australia.

On arrival in Australia, William escapes, surviving in the outback, and collapses on the grave of an Aboriginal shaman. He is discovered by some Beingalite people, who regard him as the reincarnation of their shaman, Murrangurk. William learns the Beingalite language; his epilepsy enables him to become their shaman. Taking Murrangurk’s name, he stays for thirty years, becoming a "feather-foot" - arbitrating in disputes, carrying out justice, and performing the "dreaming" rituals. The patterns he saw in his youthful visions are revealed as Aboriginal.

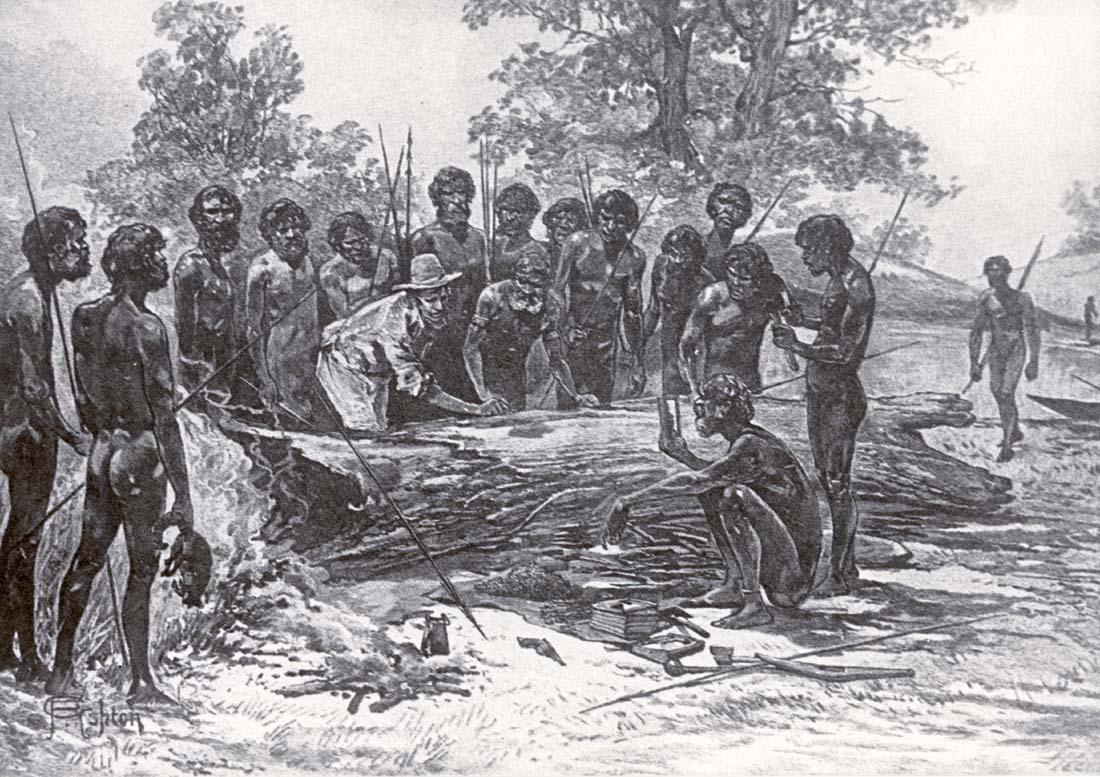
An artist's impression of Batman's Treaty being signed in 1835

Many years later, he intervenes to prevent the slaughter of some newly-arrived English soldiers. He mediates between the Aboriginal tribes and the British sheep-farmers led by John Batman. For this, he is granted a governmental pardon, but remains as Murrangurk with his rituals. The aims of the settlers and Aborigines soon prove incompatible, as the Beingalite slaughter the settlers' sheep. In reprisal, the Beingalite are massacred, and the remnants of the tribe are forcibly Europeanised. Realizing his efforts have failed, he performs one last ritual in which he sees Bungil, the Beingalite ancestor. Bungil tells him that the Dreaming has been preserved: it is William's role to take it to his own home, for another person to take up later. As a token, Bungil gives William a ritual woomera spear-thrower.

Back in Cheshire, William finds that the old community ritual has been destroyed. He meets Edward and gives him the woomera. Esther is a married woman; she has named her son after William, but it seems the actual father is Edward. Though heartbroken, William accepts these events as part of "the Dance". Bidding Esther goodbye, he leaves to ritually walk the landscapes of Cheshire as he once walked Australia. His walk ends in the church. Taking off his clothes and painting his body with clay, he dances a spirit dance.

== Reception ==
The literary critic Jenny Turner, writing in The Guardian, notes that Strandloper has been described as Garner's "first ever adult book". She praises the novel as "constructed like a Buntingesque prose poem of continuity and rupture, environment and myth", commenting that the dialogue "is stunningly harsh and bare, forcing the reader to work and think and learn". She criticizes the "Aboriginal episodes" as "the usual anthropological nonsense, dotted with that giveaway primitive-peoples linguistic marker, the biblical cadence." In short, she finds the work "disappointingly precious" and "a bit embarrassing to read", even if "patches of the writing are lovely".

The author and folklorist Neil Philip, writing in Signal, states that Garner "clearly regards" the real-life William Buckley as his "spiritual ancestor". He notes that Aboriginal churinga are totemic artefacts that "record sacred details of the eternal Dreamtime", in a form that only initiates can understand. In Philip's view, that makes Strandloper heavy with private meaning, and accordingly "hard to gauge": he supposes that the first page will cause many readers to give up, and that this was intentional on Garner's part. He summarizes the book's theme as that "Aboriginal spirituality offers a balance of individual and community, and man and landscape, of a kind that we [Westerners] need". The novelist Brian Attebery, writing in The New York Review of Science Fiction, admires Garner's handling of the story. In his University of Oxford PhD thesis, the scholar of Welsh mythology Felix Taylor writes that "Garner’s depiction of aboriginal cultures, first in Australia in Strandloper and then back in Cheshire in Boneland, develops ideas of rootedness in a local landscape which also connects him to the spirit of his ancestors." Taylor notes that Garner had studied Welsh mythology in relation to his native Cheshire, and had then expanded his "idiosyncratic" understanding of this "into a wider conception of a universal mythic consciousness". In Taylor's view, Garner portrayed in the novel "what he saw as the psychologically restorative powers of mythological narratives and imagery."

The Tolkien scholar Jason Fisher, reviewing the book for the Mythopoeic Society's Mythprint, calls it "a remarkable, luminous, difficult book", and "the most purely mythopoeic of all Garner’s novels". Fisher warns that the work "is not for all readers", and not like Garner's other novels, either. In Fisher's view, it depicts "Garner's deep, almost baptismal immersion" into folklore and then an "alien mythology". The reader, he states, has to work actively to unravel "its abstruse layers". He found it "very much worth the effort". Another Tolkien scholar, Patrick Curry, lists Moby-Dick, The Master and Margarita, Le Grand Meaulnes, Riddley Walker, and Out of Africa as among the few works of "mythic fiction" that could be considered comparable to The Lord of the Rings, commenting that most of these were their authors' life's work. He wrote in 1997 that Strandloper might perhaps find a place alongside those books, but that it was too early to tell.
