= Roaches Grit =

Roaches Grit is a coarse sandstone which outcrops widely throughout the western part of the Peak District of northern England and gives rise to several significant landscape features in the area. Its counterpart in the eastern part of the National Park is the Ashover Grit.

The combined Roaches Grit and Ashover Grit are amongst the most widespread sandstone units within the Millstone Grit Group of the Peak District. Along with other similar sandstones, such as the immediately overlying Chatsworth Grit, it is assigned to the Marsdenian sub-stage of the Namurian stage within the Carboniferous period.

The two units which, prior to the doming and erosion of the central Peak District were once one, are interpreted as delta-top sandstones. The deposited material was brought down from a northerly source by braided rivers.

== Landscape features ==
Amongst the features for which the Roaches Grit is responsible are Axe Edge, The Roaches, Hen Cloud, Ramshaw Rocks, Back Forest and Hangingstone. The natural chasm of Lud’s Church is developed within the Roaches Grit whilst it also forms the lower slopes of Shutlingsloe.

Equally the Ashover Grit contributes to the landscape in the form of Stanton Moor and Harthill Moor. The former is home to gritstone quarries whilst the latter boasts Robin Hood’s Stride and Cratcliffe Tor. Much of the country around Edensor and Baslow (though not Baslow Edge) and around Ashover, from whence it derives its name, is underlain and shaped by this rock.
