= The Moon of Gomrath =

1963 fantasy novel by Alan Garner

- First edition
- Author: Alan Garner
- Cover artist: George Adamson
- Language: English
- Genre: Children's novel, Fantasy
- Publisher: William Collins, Sons
- Publication date: 1963
- Publication place: United Kingdom
- Media type: Print (Hardcover & Paperback)
- Preceded by: The Weirdstone of Brisingamen
- Followed by: Boneland

The Moon of Gomrath is a fantasy story by the author Alan Garner, published in 1963. It is the sequel to The Weirdstone of Brisingamen.

== Plot synopsis ==
Once again, it details the involvement of two children, Colin and Susan, with the world of myth and magic. This time the focus is on the potential of the older, wilder forms of magic and myth cycle to create both creative and destructive forces on the world.

To ease the surrender of the Weirdstone in The Weirdstone of Brisingamen, Susan was given a magical bracelet by Angharad Goldenhand. It is the donning of this bracelet which has launched Susan unwittingly on a destiny connected with the cycles of the moon and hence the older wilder powers of the world. The Moon of Gomrath begins when the elves (lios-alfar) borrow the bracelet, with her consent, to see if its power can be directed by them to battle an unknown evil power in their own lands in Sinadon. However while unprotected by the bracelet, Susan is possessed by the Brollachan, an ancient evil released after an old pit is broken open during building work. The wizard Cadellin, guardian of the sleeping knights in The Weirdstone of Brisingamen, cannot restore Susan after the Brollachan has been driven out of her body; instead perceiving that her spirit has been driven to another spiritual dimension, unreachable with ordinary means. It is Colin's true-hearted heroic love and need for his sister which provides the answer; as he responds to the older powers of the world. He therefore comes to seek the Mothan at moonrise. The Mothan is a mythical plant which grows on the Old Straight Track. This is a motif inspired by the book named The Old Straight Track. It is part of the Old Magic, in contrast to Cadellin's High Magic. Susan is dramatically restored to her own body.

However, her sojourn to other levels of existence has sensitised her to the powers with which she and her brother have been coming to associate and the story takes a new dramatic turn. On walking home across the Edge on dusk, they are inspired to build a fire to keep warm, Susan almost manically so. This fire includes rowan and pine which unintendedly act as a wendfire, which on this night of the year has the power to call ancient spirits from their mounds. Colin and Susan release the Wild Hunt, which return several times during the course of the novel.

While they are trying to undo what they have done, the Morrigan captures Colin and imprisons him in Errwood Hall, which her magic restores into a building, which except in moonlight teleports into a lightless magic realm. This sets up the denouement, a pitched battle between the forces of the Morrigan (goblin-like bodachs and wildcat palugs) and Susan's allies (the lios-alfar, the dwarf Uthecar, and man Albanac), both willing and unwilling. Although Colin is rescued, Albanac is killed. When the elves withdraw their support as a lost cause, the Morrigan finally releases the Brollachan, focusing it on Susan to destroy her growing potential as a force for good. It is the other gift from Angharad Goldenhand which saves the day and the Old Magic is set free forever.

== Background ==
Garner provides a sidelight on his authorial approach by including an appendix of books which inspired him, along with a brief discussion of his approach to mythology.

Garner repeatedly refused to write a third, despite persistent requests, claiming that this would actually diminish the emotional power of the first two books and that his material, interests and style have moved on long ago. However Boneland, the conclusion to the sequence, was finally published in August 2012.
