= Boneland =

2012 fantasy novel by Alan Garner

- Cover of 1st edition
- Author: Alan Garner
- Language: English
- Genre: Fantasy
- Publisher: Fourth Estate
- Publication date: 2012
- Publication place: United Kingdom
- Media type: Print (Hardcover & Paperback)
- ISBN: 978-0007463251
- Preceded by: The Moon of Gomrath

Boneland is a 2012 novel by Alan Garner, a sequel to The Weirdstone of Brisingamen and The Moon of Gomrath. The boy Colin from the earlier novels is now an adult, still living near the top of Alderley Edge but now a professor working at the nearby Jodrell Bank Observatory. His solitary home is a kit-built hut ("A Bergli") in a quarry. He has a form of amnesia which means he remembers nothing from before the age of 13, including his twin sister and his childhood adventures. He visits a psychotherapist and the gradual uncovering of his past forms the main story.

Interleaved with Colin's tale is another story set in the same part of England but at a distant time. A lone Stone-Age cave dweller leaves "Ludcruck" (the chasm of Ludchurch) in search of companionship.

Garner says that the focus of his research for the book was "the universal myth of the sleeping hero". He has written his own experience of psychotherapy into the novel. "Go to the pain", he was told by his therapist, "go to where it hurts the most, and say whatever it tells you." An important item towards the end of the book is a Lower Palaeolithic hand axe. Garner keeps such an axe in his study, although his is from the Acheulean culture while the one in the book is from the even older Abbevillian culture.
