= The Weirdstone of Brisingamen =

1960 fantasy novel by Alan Garner

The Weirdstone of Brisingamen: A Tale of Alderley
- The 1960 first edition of the book.
- Author: Alan Garner
- Cover artist: George Adamson
- Language: English
- Genre: Children's novel, Fantasy
- Publisher: William Collins, Sons
- Publication date: 1960
- Publication place: United Kingdom
- Media type: Print (hardback & paperback)
- Pages: 224
- ISBN: 0-529-05519-8
- OCLC: 4593190
- LC Class: PZ7.G18417 We 1979
- Followed by: The Moon of Gomrath

The Weirdstone of Brisingamen: A Tale of Alderley is a children's fantasy novel by English author Alan Garner. Garner began work on the novel, his literary debut, in 1957, after he moved into the late medieval house, Toad Hall, in Blackden, Cheshire. The story, which took the local legend of The Wizard of the Edge as a partial basis for the novel's plot, was influenced by the folklore and landscape of neighbouring Alderley Edge where he had grown up. Upon completion the book was picked up by Sir William Collins who released it through his publishing company Collins in 1960.

The novel, set in and around Macclesfield and Alderley Edge in Cheshire, tells the story of two children, Colin and Susan, who are staying with some old friends of their mother while their parents are overseas. Susan possesses a small tear-shaped jewel held in a bracelet: unknown to her, this is the weirdstone of the title. Its nature is revealed when the children are hunted by the minions of the dark spirit Nastrond who, centuries before, had been defeated and banished by a powerful king. The children also have to compete with the wicked shape-shifting sorceress Selina Place and the evil wizard Grimnir, each of whom wishes to possess the weirdstone. Along the way Colin and Susan are aided by the wizard Cadellin Silverbrow and his dwarf companions.

The novel met with critical praise and led to a sequel, The Moon of Gomrath, published in 1963. Growing to dislike the main characters, Garner decided not to write the envisioned third part of the trilogy. For the 1963 reprint Garner also made several changes to the original text and by the late 1960s he came to reject The Weirdstone of Brisingamen as "a fairly bad book". Although it fell out of critical approval it was adapted in the late 1970s as a musical that was staged in Manchester and Essex. In 2010 HarperCollins brought out a special 50th anniversary issue of the book, containing a new preface by Garner and praise from various other figures involved in children's literature, while 2011 saw BBC Radio 4 produce a radio adaptation. In August 2012 Boneland, the third volume in Garner's trilogy, was finally released.

== Plot ==
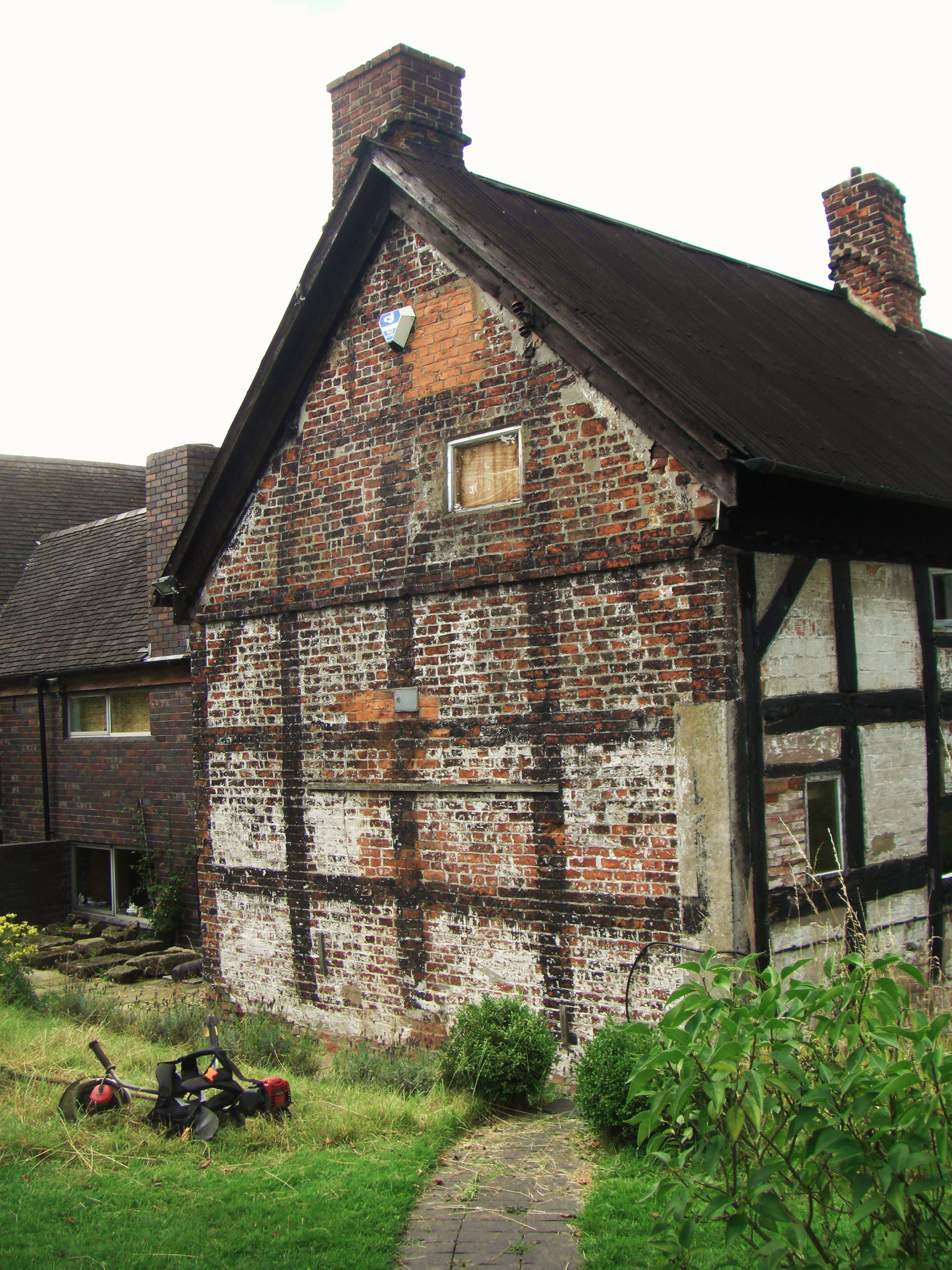
In 1957, Garner purchased and began renovating Toad Hall in Blackden, Cheshire, where he wrote The Weirdstone.

The book's introduction concerns the origin of the weirdstone. Following the defeat of Nastrond steps had been taken to prepare for his eventual return. This involved bringing together a small band of warriors of pure heart, each with a horse, and gathering them inside the old dwarf caves of Fundindelve, deep inside the hill of Alderley. The caves were sealed by powerful white magic which would both defend Fundindelve from evil as the ages passed and prevent the warriors and their horses from ageing. When the time was ripe and the world once more in mortal peril it was prophesied that this small band of warriors would ride out from the hill, trusting in their purity of heart to defeat Nastrond forever. Fundindelve had a guardian, the ancient wizard Cadellin Silverbrow, and the heart of the white magic was sealed inside a drop-shaped jewel, the Weirdstone of Brisingamen, also known as Firefrost.

At the beginning of the story, however, the Weirdstone has been lost, stolen centuries before by a farmer whose milk-white mare Cadellin had bought to complete the numbers in Fundindelve. The stone became a family heirloom – now called only "the Tear"- and eventually found its way to Susan's mother, who passed it on to Susan, oblivious of its history and purpose. When the children meet Cadellin the wizard fails to notice the bracelet even when the children come to visit him in Fundindelve. However, its presence does not go unnoticed by Selina Place and the witches of the morthbrood, who send their minions to steal it. Susan finally realises the identity of the Weirdstone and, fearing its destruction, sets out to warn the wizard. The children return to Fundindelve but are waylaid by a dark presence and the Tear is taken. Once they inform Cadellin they are told to keep away, to not further involve themselves. However, while exploring on their bikes they notice a mysterious cloud travelling across the landscape before hovering over the home of Selina Place, St Mary's Clyffe, and they go to investigate hoping to recover the stone on their own. They are successful but become lost in a labyrinth of mine-shafts and caverns. As the members of the morthbrood and Selina Place, later revealed as The Morrigan, close in on them they are rescued by a pair of dwarves, Fenodyree and Durathror, who are close companions of Cadellin. After passing through many perils the group returns to the farm where Susan and Colin are staying to spend the night, where at midnight The Morrigan menaces them through the door. They set out with the farm's owner the next day to return the Weirdstone to Cadellin before it can fall into the wrong hands. Their travels take them through gardens, lawns, fens, tangled rhododendron thickets, pine plantations, mountain peaks and snowy fields while striving to avoid the attention of the morthbrood.

At the climax of the story a great battle takes place on a hill near Alderley during which the children and their companions make a desperate last stand to protect the Weirdstone. However the enemy forces prove too strong and Durathror is mortally wounded. Grimnir takes the Weirdstone for himself and, in the ensuing chaos, Nastrond sends the great wolf Fenrir (in some editions Managarm) to destroy his enemies. As the remaining companions begin to despair, Cadellin appears and slays Grimnir, whom he reveals to be his own brother and who in the final moment accepts defeat and drops the stone into Cadellin's hand. The Morrigan flees in terror while Cadellin uses the power of the Weirdstone to subdue once again the forces of darkness.

== Characters ==
- Susan – A young girl who inadvertently becomes the guardian of the "weirdstone"; for this reason she is sometimes referred to by the other characters as "Stonemaiden".
- Colin – Susan's twin brother who shares in her adventures (the fact that they are twins is not explicit until Boneland was published, although this is hinted at in the passage through the Earldelving, where Colin is described as being "an inch taller than his sister" [p. 141])
- Gowther Mossock – A farmer with whom the children are staying while their parents are away overseas.
- Bess Mossock – Gowther's wife; years ago she was nurse to the children's mother.
- Cadellin Silverbrow – The ancient wizard who was long ago entrusted with the guardianship of the weirdstone and the sleeping knights of Fundindelve.
- Fenodyree – A dwarf, ally to Cadellin who watches over the children in his stead.
- Durathror – Prince of the Huldrafolk, and Fenodyree's cousin, whose pride lies in his strength in battle.
- Selina Place – A local woman, who is revealed to be a shape-shifting witch, indeed the leader of the morthbrood, a secret network of people involved in dark magic. Also known as The Morrigan, the ancient name of an Irish battle and death goddess, she is in league with powerful forces of darkness.
- Grimnir – An evil magician, and the estranged twin brother of Cadellin Silverbrow, who wishes to keep the Weirdstone for himself; he forms a reluctant alliance with Selina Place to gain the stone from Cadellin.
- Nastrond – The great spirit of darkness who was defeated by the King in Fundindelve, but is ever waiting to return and conquer the mortal world. He is mentioned in the book but never appears firsthand.
- Svart alfar – Goblins, described by Cadellin as "the maggot breed of Ymir"
- Lios alfar – Elves of light, exiled from populated areas, "the scab(s) of tile and brick"
- James Henry Hodgkins – A local businessman who happens to be a member of the morthbrood, whom they narrowly elude in Radnor Wood.

== Background ==
=== Alan Garner ===
Map drawn by Charles Green to illustrate the book.

Map of The Edge drawn by Charles Green to illustrate the book.

Alan Garner was born in the front room of his grandmother's house in Congleton, Cheshire, on 17 October 1934. He grew up not far away, in Alderley Edge, a well-to-do rural Cheshire village that by this time had effectively become a suburb of Manchester. Growing up in "a rural working-class family", Garner's ancestry had been connected to Alderley Edge since at least the 16th century, with Alan tracing his lineage back to the death of William Garner in 1592. The Garner family had passed on "a genuine oral tradition", teaching their children the folk tales about The Edge, which included a description of a king and his army of knights that slept under it, guarded by a wizard, and in the mid 19th century, Alan's great-great-grandfather Robert had carved the face of a bearded wizard onto the rock of a cliff next to a well that was known in local folklore as the Wizard's Well.

Alan's own grandfather, Joseph Garner, "could read, but didn't and so was virtually unlettered", but instead taught his grandson the various folk tales about The Edge, Alan later remarking that, as a result, he was "aware of [the Edge's] magic" when as a child he would often play there with his friends. The story of the king and the wizard living under the hill played an important part in the young Alan's life, becoming "deeply embedded in my psyche" and influencing his novels, in particular The Weirdstone of Brisingamen.

In 1957 Garner purchased Toad Hall, a late mediaeval building in Blackden, seven miles from Alderley Edge. In the late 19th century the Hall had been divided into two agricultural labourers' cottages, but Garner obtained both for a total of £670, and proceeded to convert them back into a single home. It was at Toad Hall, on the afternoon of Tuesday 4 September 1957, that Garner set about writing his first novel, which would result in The Weirdstone of Brisingamen. Whilst engaged in writing in his spare time, Garner attempted to gain employment as a teacher, but soon gave that up, believing that "I couldn't write and teach: the energies were too similar". He began working as a general labourer for four years, remaining unemployed for much of that time.

=== Landscape of Cheshire ===
Like many of Garner's books the novel is set in the real landscape of Cheshire, in this case focused around Alderley Edge, and features fictional characters interacting at genuine sites such as the sandstone escarpment of the Edge, the Wizard's Well, the open mine pits, and the Beacon." Literary critic Neil Philip would later relate that "this sense of a numinous, sacred potency in landscape" was something that imbued all of Garner's work.

In a 1968 article Garner explained why he chose to set The Weirdstone of Brisingamen in a real landscape rather than in a fictional realm, remarking that "If we are in Eldorado, and we find a mandrake, then OK, so it's a mandrake: in Eldorado anything goes. But, by force of imagination, compel the reader to believe that there is a mandrake in a garden in Mayfield Road, Ulverston, Lancs, then when you pull up that mandrake it is really going to scream; and possibly the reader will too."

Some features of the Cheshire landscape mentioned in the story are:

- Alderley Edge
- St. Mary's Clyffe
- The Edge
  - Castle Rock
  - Holy Well
  - Stormy Point
  - Iron Gates
  - Druid Stones
  - Old Quarry
  - Golden Stone
  - The Wizard Inn
  - West Mine
- Highmost Redmanhey
- Radnor Wood
- The Parkhouse
- Dumville's Plantation
- Monks Heath
- Sodger's Hump
- Bag Brook
- Marlheath
- Capesthorne Hall
- Redesmere
- Thornycroft Hall
- Pyethorne Wood
- Gawsworth
- Danes Moss
- Macclesfield Forest
- Shuttlingsloe
- Piggford Moor
- Clulow Cross

=== Mythology and folklore ===
==== Story ====
The legend of The Wizard of Alderley Edge revolves around a king and his sleeping knights who rest beneath the hill, waiting for the day when they must awake to save the land. Each knight had a steed, a pure white horse. However, at the time the knights were placed under their enchanted slumber, the wizard whose job it was to guard the king and his knights found that they lacked one horse. One day, he encountered a local farmer taking a pure white mare to sell at the market. The wizard bought the horse, offering the farmer many rich jewels taken from the king's secret store of treasure under the Edge in payment.

"As I turned toward writing, which is partially intellectual in its function, but is primarily intuitive and emotional in its execution, I turned towards that which was numinous and emotional in me, and that was the legend of King Arthur Asleep Under the Hill. It stood for all that I'd had to give up in order to understand what I'd had to give up. And so my first two books, which are very poor on characterization because I was somehow numbed in that area, are very strong on imagery and landscape, because the landscape I had inherited along with the legend."

— Alan Garner, 1989

==== Language ====
The majority of the non-English words used in The Weirdstone of Brisingamen have been adopted from Norse mythology. For instance, the svart-alfar, which means 'black elves' in Scandinavian, are described as the "maggot-breed of Ymir", a reference to the primeval giant of Norse myth; while the realm of Ragnarok, which in Garner's story is the home of the malevolent spirit Nastrond, is actually named after the Norse end-of-the-world myth. Fimbulwinter, the magically induced winter weather that hinders the children's escape, also refers to Norse eschatology.

==== Characters ====
Other terms are taken not from Norse mythology, but from the Welsh mythology encapsulated in Mediaeval texts like the Mabinogion. For instance, Govannon, one of the names with which Garner addresses Grimnir, has been adopted from the mythological character of Govannon ap Dun. Although Garner avoided incorporating his story into Arthurian mythology, the benevolent wizard in the novel, Cadellin Silverbrow, does have a link to the Arthurian mythos, in that "Cadellin" is one of the many names by which Culhwch invoked Arthur's aid in the Mediaeval Welsh Arthurian romance about Culhwch and Olwen.

Other words used in the novel are taken from elsewhere in European mythology and folklore. The name of Fenodyree, a benevolent dwarf in Garner's tale, is actually borrowed from Manx folklore, where it refers to a type of grotesque goblin or brownie. Meanwhile, the Morrigan, whom Garner presents as a malevolent shapeshifting witch, has a name adopted from Irish mythology, where she is a war goddess who is the most powerful aspect of the tripartite goddess Badb. Literary critic Neil Philip also argued that further folkloric and mythological influences could be seen in the character of Grimnir, who had both a foul smell from and an aversion to fresh water, characteristics traditionally associated with the Nuckelavee, a creature in Scottish folklore. Accompanying this, Philip opined that Grimnir was also "half identified" with the creature Grendel, the antagonist in the Old English poem Beowulf.

== Publication ==
Garner sent his debut novel to the publishing company Collins, where it was picked up by the company's head, Sir William Collins, who was on the lookout for new fantasy novels following on from the recent commercial and critical success of J. R. R. Tolkien's The Lord of the Rings (1954–55). Garner, who would go on to become a personal friend of Collins, would later relate that "Billy Collins saw a title with funny-looking words in it on the stockpile, and he decided to publish it."

"I could not have hoped for the mood of the book to be better expressed. George Adamson has caught it exactly. Fenodyree is just as I imagined him and the eyes are the best part of the jacket. I am delighted."

— Alan Garner in a letter to the publisher, regarding cover artist George Adamson

Following its release in 1960, The Weirdstone of Brisingamen proved to be a "resounding success... both critically and commercially", later being described as "a tour de force of the imagination, a novel that showed almost every writer who came afterwards what it was possible to achieve in novels ostensibly published for children." For the book's republication in 1963, Garner made several alterations to the text, (Note: For a summary of the changes made between the 1960 and 193 editions see Mapson, Robert. "The Weirdstone of Brisingamen variorum". The unofficial Alan Garner website.) excising what Neil Philip called "extraneous clauses, needless adjectives and flabby phrases." In his opinion, this "second text is taut where the first one is slack, precise where the first is woolly." Nonetheless, as the novel was republished by the US market by Puffin Books as an Armada Lion paperback in 1971, the 1960 text was once more used.

=== 50th anniversary reprint ===
The special 50th anniversary publication

In the fiftieth anniversary edition of The Weirdstone of Brisingamen, published by HarperCollins in 2010, several notable British fantasy novelists praised Garner and his work. Susan Cooper related that "The power and range of Alan Garner's astounding talent has grown with every book he's written", whilst David Almond called him one of Britain's "greatest writers" whose works "really matter". Philip Pullman, the author of the His Dark Materials trilogy, went further when he remarked that:

Garner is indisputably the great originator, the most important British writer of fantasy since Tolkien, and in many respects better than Tolkien, because deeper and more truthful ... Any country except Britain would have long ago recognised his importance, and celebrated it with postage stamps and statues and street-names. But that's the way with us: our greatest prophets go unnoticed by the politicians and the owners of media empires. I salute him with the most heartfelt respect and admiration.

Another British fantasy author, Neil Gaiman, said "Garner's fiction is something special" in that it was "smart and challenging, based in the here and the now, in which real English places emerged from the shadows of folklore, and in which people found themselves walking, living and battling their way through the dreams and patterns of myth." Praise also came from Nick Lake, the editorial director of HarperCollins Children's Books, who proclaimed that "Garner is, quite simply, one of the greatest and most influential writers this country has ever produced."

== Reception ==
In 1970 The Weirdstone of Brisingamen was given the Lewis Carroll Shelf Award by the University of Wisconsin–Madison School of Education.

=== The author ===
Upon publication it was a critical success, but later Garner had begun to find fault, referring to it in a 1968 interview as "a fairly bad book" and in 1970 as "one of the worst books published in the last twenty years... technically... inept".

=== Literary critics ===
Literary critic Neil Philip devoted a chapter to both The Weirdstone of Brisingamen and The Moon of Gomrath in his book A Fine Anger: A Critical Introduction to the Work of Alan Garner (1981). He noted that it had become "fashionable to condemn Garner's early work, perhaps because of his own dismissive attitude to it." He argued that the two books "may be flawed", but that "they are arguably Garner's most popular books; certainly it is on them that his reputation as a purely children's author rests." Philip argued that The Weirdstone of Brisingamen suffers from a "lack of characterisation"; its "most serious flaw". Yet he also felt that the book had much to commend it, with a narrative that while "unstructured", was "gripping and enthralling", holding the reader's attention and keeping them "guessing what is going to happen next." He commented on "Garner's assured, poetic command of English", with a writing style that is "more fleshy, more prolix than the pared-down economy of Garner's later style".

In the 2005 book Horror: Another 100 Best Books, edited by Stephen Jones and Kim Newman, Muriel Gray's article for The Weirdstone of Brisingamen described it with expressions such as "truly gripping," "beautifully crafted" and "a young person's introduction to horror."

=== Other fantasy writers ===
The book has received high praise from numerous other fantasy writers. Young adult fantasy writer Garth Nix indicated its impact on his own writing, saying "The Weirdstone of Brisingamen is one of the most important books in children’s fantasy. It has been an enormous inspiration to me and countless other writers, and is as enjoyable and fascinating now as it was when I first read it, wide-eyed and mesmerised at the age of ten."

Philip Pullman also gave it high praise, stating "Alan Garner is indisputably the great originator, the most important British writer of fantasy since Tolkien." Neil Gaiman has observed that "Alan Garner’s fiction is something special. Garner’s fantasies were smart and challenging, based in the here and now, in which real English places emerged from the shadow of folklore, and in which people found themselves walking, living and battling their way through the dreams and patterns of myth."

== Adaptations ==
=== 1963 radio drama ===
A six-part radio adaptation by Nan MacDonald was broadcast on the BBC Home Service in 1963. The cast included John Thornley as Colin, Margaret Dew as Susan, Alison Bayley as Selina Place, Geoffrey Banks as Cadellin the Wizard, Brian Trueman as Fenodyree, John Blain as Police Sergeant, Ronald Harvi as Durathror, and George Hagan as Narrator.

=== 1989 radio drama ===
The novel was dramatised in four parts by David Wade, and broadcast on BBC Radio 4 in 1989. The production was directed at BBC Manchester by Caroline Smith. It starred Robin Bailey as Cadellin, James Tomlinson as Gowther Mossock/Narrator, Andrea Murphy as Susan, Mark Kingston as Colin, Rosalind Knight as Selina Place, Patsy Byrne as Bess, George Parsons as Guard/Ticket collector, Richard Herdman as Farmer/Porter, and Anne Jameson as the Crow.

=== 2011 radio drama ===
In the 2011 BBC Radio 4 adaptation Robert Powell played the narrator; he has known Garner since he was a schoolboy at Manchester Grammar School. Struan Rodger, who played the dwarf Durathror, was in a radio production of another Garner story, Elidor, when he was thirteen years old. This adaptation was broadcast again in November 2012.

=== Musical ===
In the 1970s, The Weirdstone of Brisingamen was adapted as a musical by Paul Pearson and was staged in 1983 in Manchester and later in Essex. The original Manchester cast included artist Sue Mason, who also designed the programme book. The songs from the show were later re-arranged by Inkubus Sukkubus with hopes of resurrecting the musical for a modern audience, but copyright restrictions have made it unlikely that it will be presented again.

== See also ==
- Brisingamen – a necklace belonging to the Norse goddess Freyja
