= Alan Garner =

English novelist (born 1934)

Alan Garner OBE FRSL
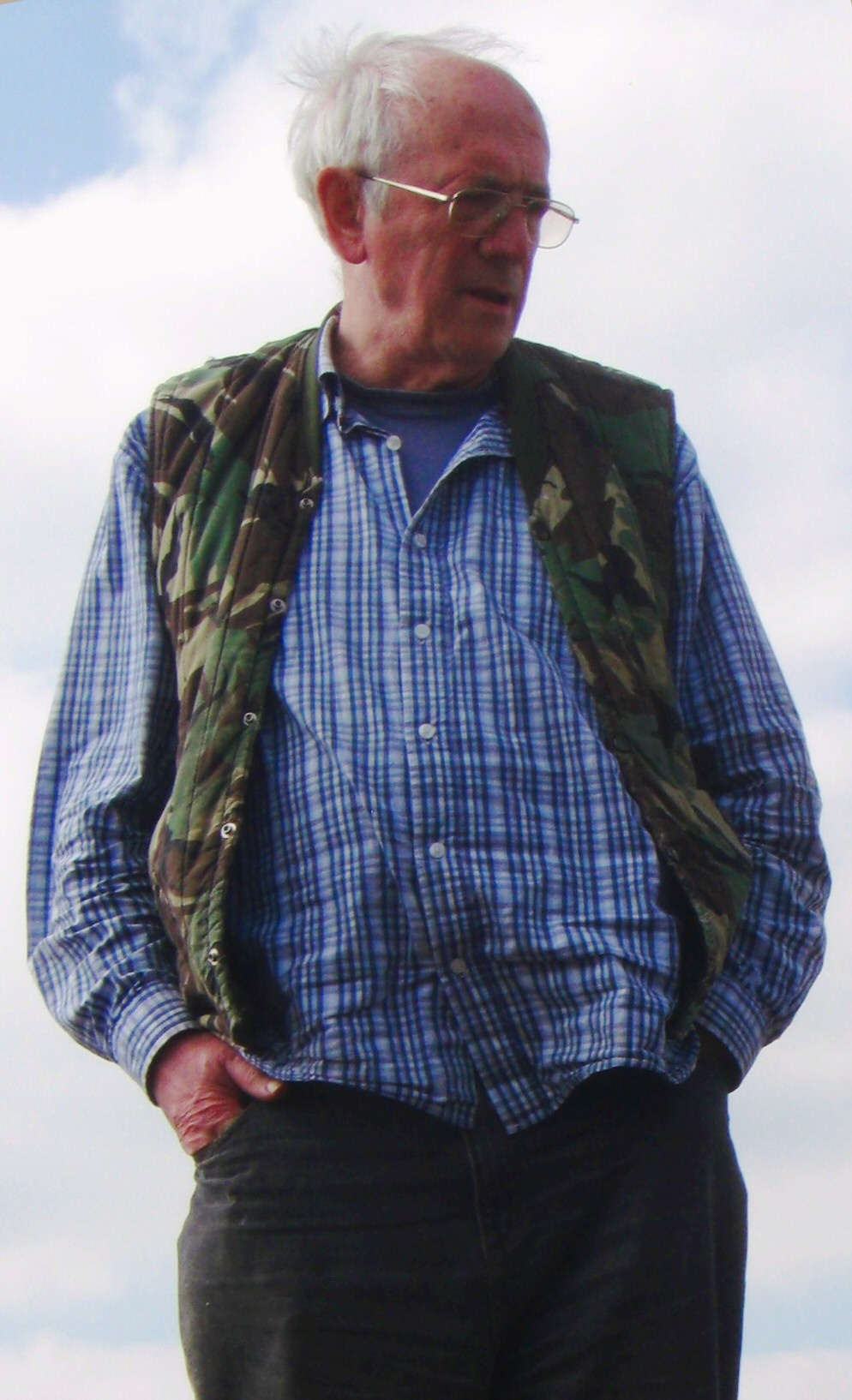
- Garner in 2011
- Born: 17 October 1934 (age 92); Congleton, Cheshire, England
- Occupations: Writer; folklorist
- Spouse: Griselda Garner (m. 1972)
- Writing career
- Period: 1960–present
- Genres: Children's fantasy, low fantasy, folklore
- Notable works: The Weirdstone of Brisingamen; The Moon of Gomrath; Elidor; The Owl Service; The Stone Book Quartet
- Notable awards: Carnegie Medal; 1967; Guardian Prize; 1968

Alan Garner (born 17 October 1934) is an English novelist best known for his children's fantasy novels and his retellings of traditional British folk tales. Much of his work is rooted in the landscape, history and folklore of his native county of Cheshire, North West England, being set in the region and making use of the native Cheshire dialect.

Born in Congleton, Garner grew up in Alderley Edge, and spent much of his youth in the wooded area known locally as "The Edge", where he gained an early interest in the folklore of the region. Studying at Manchester Grammar School and then briefly at Oxford University, in 1957 he moved to the village of Blackden, where he bought and renovated an Early Modern Period (circa 1590) building known as Toad Hall. His first novel, The Weirdstone of Brisingamen, was published in 1960. A children's fantasy novel set on the Edge, it incorporated elements of local folklore in its plot and characters. Garner wrote a sequel, The Moon of Gomrath (1963), and a third book, Boneland (2012). He wrote several fantasy novels, including Elidor (1965), The Owl Service (1967) and Red Shift (1973).

Turning away from fantasy as a genre, Garner produced The Stone Book Quartet (1979), a series of four short novellas detailing a day in the life of four generations of his family. He also published a series of British folk tales which he had rewritten in a series of books entitled Alan Garner's Fairy Tales of Gold (1979), Alan Garner's Book of British Fairy Tales (1984) and A Bag of Moonshine (1986). In his subsequent novels, Strandloper (1996) and Thursbitch (2003), he continued writing tales revolving around Cheshire, although without the fantasy elements which had characterised his earlier work.

== Biography ==
=== Early life: 1934–56 ===
"I had to get aback [to familial ways of doing things], by using skills that had been denied to my ancestors; but I had nothing that they would have called worthwhile. My ability was in language and languages. I had to use that, somehow. And writing was a manual craft. But what did I know that I could write about? I knew the land."

— Alan Garner, 2010

Garner was born in the front room of his grandmother's house in Congleton, Cheshire, on 17 October 1934. He was raised in Alderley Edge, a well-to-do village that had effectively become a suburb of Manchester. His "rural working-class family", had been connected to Alderley Edge since at least the sixteenth century and could be traced back to the death of William Garner in 1592. Garner has stated that his family had passed on "a genuine oral tradition" involving folk tales about The Edge, which included a description of a king and his army of knights who slept under it, guarded by a wizard. In the mid-nineteenth century Alan's great-great-grandfather Robert had carved the face of a bearded wizard onto the face of a cliff next to a well, known locally at that time as the Wizard's Well.

Robert Garner and his other relatives had all been craftsmen, and, according to Garner, each successive generation had tried to "improve on, or do something different from, the previous generation". Garner's grandfather, Joseph Garner, "could read, but didn't and so was virtually unlettered". Instead, he taught his grandson the folk tales he knew about The Edge. Garner later remarked that as a result, he was "aware of [the Edge's] magic" as a child, and he and his friends often played there. The story of the king and the wizard living under the hill played an important part in his life, becoming, he explained, "deeply embedded in my psyche" and heavily influencing his later novels.

Garner faced several life-threatening childhood illnesses, which left him bedridden for much of the time. He attended a local village school, where he found that, despite being praised for his intelligence, he was punished for speaking in his native Cheshire dialect; for instance, when he was six his primary school teacher washed his mouth out with soapy water. Garner then won a place at Manchester Grammar School, where he received his secondary education; entry was means-tested, resulting in his school fees being waived. Rather than focusing his interest on creative writing, it was here that he excelled at sprinting. He used to go jogging along the highway, and later claimed that in doing so he was sometimes accompanied by the mathematician Alan Turing, who shared his fascination for the Disney film Snow White and the Seven Dwarfs. Garner was then conscripted into national service, serving for a time with the Royal Artillery while posted to Woolwich in Southeast London.

At school, Garner had developed a keen interest in the work of Aeschylus and Homer, as well as the Ancient Greek language. Thus, he decided to pursue the study of Classics at Magdalen College, Oxford, passing his entrance exams in January 1953; at the time he had thoughts of becoming a professional academic. He was the first member of his family to receive anything more than a basic education, and he noted that this removed him from his "cultural background" and led to something of a schism with other members of his family, who "could not cope with me, and I could not cope with" them. Looking back, he remarked, "I soon learned that it was not a good idea to come home excited over irregular verbs". In 1955, he joined the university theatrical society, playing the role of Mark Antony in a performance of William Shakespeare's Antony and Cleopatra where he co-starred alongside Dudley Moore and where Kenneth Baker was the stage manager. In August 1956, he decided that he wished to devote himself to novel writing, and decided to abandon his university education without taking a degree; he left Oxford in late 1956. He nevertheless felt that the academic rigour which he learned during his university studies has remained "a permanent strength through all my life".

=== The Weirdstone of Brisingamen and The Moon of Gomrath: 1957–64 ===
Aged 22, Garner was out cycling when he came across a hand-painted sign announcing that an agricultural cottage in Toad Hall – a late medieval building situated in Blackden, seven miles from Alderley Edge – was on sale for £510. Although he personally could not afford it, he was lent the money by the local Oddfellow lodge, enabling him to purchase and move into the cottage in June 1957. In the late nineteenth century the Hall had been divided into two agricultural labourers' cottages, but Garner was able to purchase the second for £150 about a year later; he proceeded to knock down the dividing walls and convert both halves back into a single home.

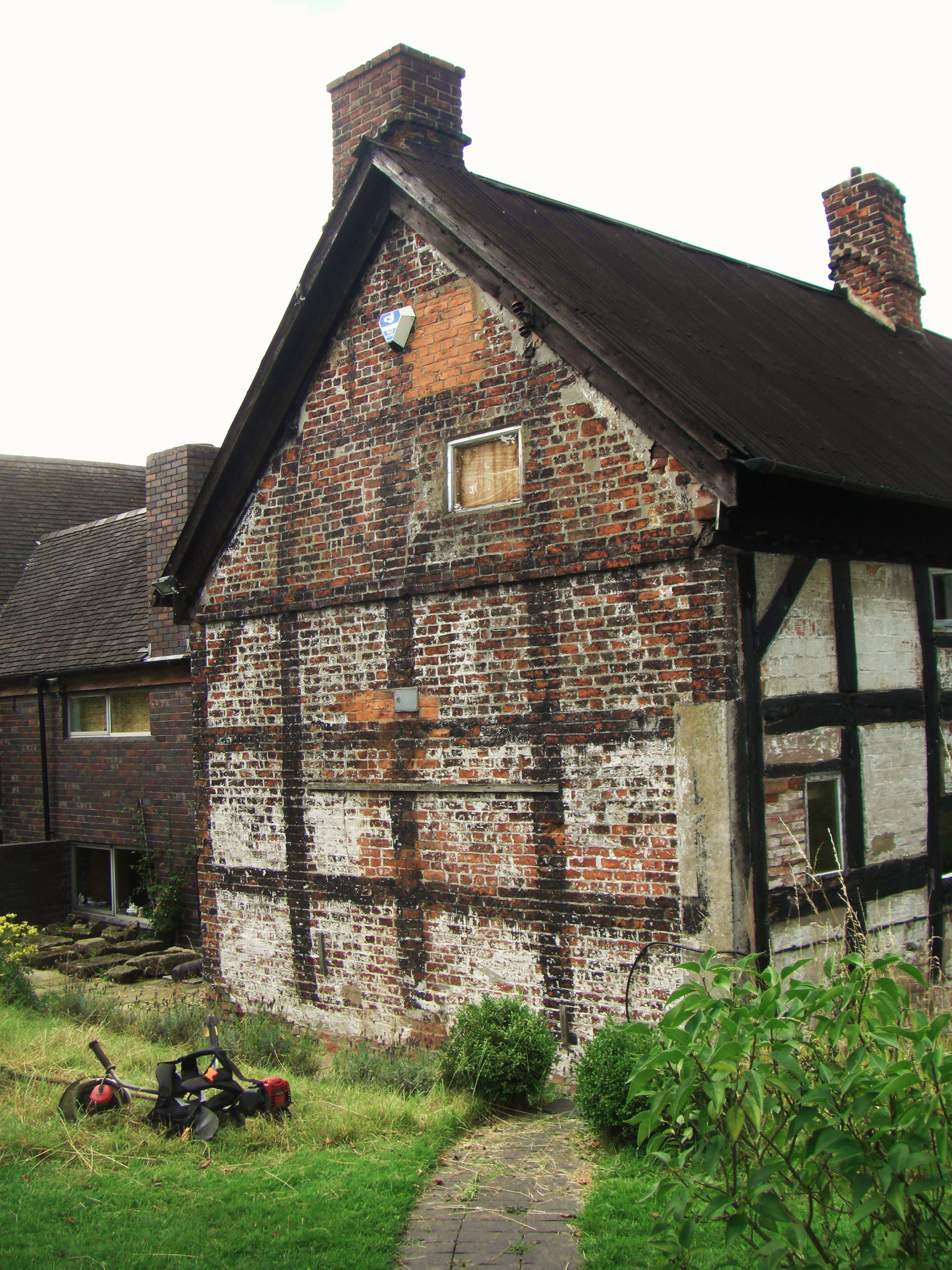
In 1957, Garner purchased and began renovating Toad Hall at Blackden, Cheshire

Garner had begun writing his first novel, The Weirdstone of Brisingamen: A Tale of Alderley, in September 1956. However it was while at Toad Hall that he finished the book. Set in Alderley Edge, it revolves around two children, Susan and Colin, who are sent to live in the area with their mother's old nursemaid, Bess, and her husband, Gowther Mossock. While exploring the Edge, they encounter a race of malevolent creatures, the svart alfar, who dwell in the Edge's abandoned mines and who seem intent on capturing them. They are rescued by the wizard Cadellin, who reveals that the forces of darkness are massing at the Edge in search of a powerful magical talisman, the eponymous "weirdstone of Brisingamen".

Whilst writing in his spare time Garner attempted to gain employment as a teacher, but soon gave that up, believing that "I couldn't write and teach; the energies were too similar." Instead, he worked off and on as a general labourer for four years, remaining unemployed for much of that time.

Garner sent his debut novel to the publishing company Collins, where it was picked up by the company's head, Sir William Collins, who was on the lookout for new fantasy novels following the recent commercial and critical success of J. R. R. Tolkien's The Lord of the Rings (1954–55). Garner, who went on to become a personal friend of Collins, would later relate that "Billy Collins saw a title with funny-looking words in it on the stockpile, and he decided to publish it." On its release in 1960, The Weirdstone of Brisingamen proved to be a critical and commercial success, later being described as "a tour de force of the imagination, a novel that showed almost every writer who came afterwards what it was possible to achieve in novels ostensibly published for children." Garner himself however would later denounce his first novel as "a fairly bad book" in 1968.

With his first book published, Garner abandoned his work as a labourer and gained a job as a freelance television reporter, living a "hand to mouth" lifestyle on a "shoestring" budget. He also began a sequel to The Weirdstone of Brisingamen, which would be known as The Moon of Gomrath. The Moon of Gomrath also revolves around the adventures of Colin and Susan, with the latter being possessed by a malevolent creature called the Brollachan who has recently re-entered the world, having been freed from its underground prison by workmen. With the help of the wizard Cadellin, the Brollachan is exorcised, but Susan's soul also leaves her body, being sent to another dimension, leaving Colin to find a way to bring it back. Critic Neil Philip characterised it as "an artistic advance" but "a less satisfying story". In a 1989 interview, Garner stated that he had left scope for a third book following the adventures of Colin and Susan, envisioning a trilogy, but that he had intentionally decided not to write it, instead moving on to write something different. However Boneland, the conclusion to the sequence, was belatedly published in August 2012.

=== Elidor, The Owl Service and Red Shift: 1964–73 ===
In 1962, Garner began work on a radio play entitled Elidor, which eventually became a novel of the same name. Set in contemporary Manchester, Elidor tells the story of four children who enter a derelict Victorian church and find a portal to the magical realm of Elidor. In Elidor, they are entrusted by King Malebron to help rescue four treasures which have been stolen by the forces of evil, who are attempting to take control of the kingdom. The children succeed and return to Manchester with the treasures, but are pursued by the malevolent forces who need the items to seal their victory.

"As I turned toward writing, which is partially intellectual in its function, but is primarily intuitive and emotional in its execution, I turned towards that which was numinous and emotional in me, and that was the legend of King Arthur Asleep Under the Hill. It stood for all that I'd had to give up in order to understand what I'd had to give up. And so my first two books, which are very poor on characterization because I was somehow numbed in that area, are very strong on imagery and landscape, because the landscape I had inherited along with the legend."

— Alan Garner, 1989

Before writing Elidor, Garner had seen a dinner service set which could be arranged to make pictures of either flowers or owls. Inspired by this design, he produced his fourth novel, The Owl Service. The story, which was heavily influenced by the Medieval Welsh tale of Math fab Mathonwy from the Mabinogion, was critically acclaimed, winning both the Carnegie Medal and Guardian Children's Fiction Prize. It also sparked discussions among critics as to whether Garner should properly be considered a children's writer, given that this book in particular was deemed equally suitable for an adult readership.

It took Garner six years to write his next novel, Red Shift. The book centres on three intertwined love stories, one set in the present, another during the English Civil War, and the third in the second century CE. Philip referred to it as "a complex book but not a complicated one: the bare lines of story and emotion stand clear". Academic specialist in children's literature Maria Nikolajeva characterised Red Shift as "a difficult book" for an unprepared reader, identifying its main themes as those of "loneliness and failure to communicate". Ultimately, she thought that repeated re-readings of the novel bring about the realisation that "it is a perfectly realistic story with much more depth and psychologically more credible than the most so-called "realistic" juvenile novels."

=== The Stone Book series and folkloric collections: 1974–94 ===
From 1976 to 1978, Garner published a series of four novellas, which have come to be collectively known as The Stone Book quartet: The Stone Book, Granny Reardun, The Aimer Gate, and Tom Fobble's Day. Each focused on a day in the life of a child in the Garner family, each from a different generation. In a 1989 interview, Garner noted that although writing The Stone Book Quartet had been "exhausting", it had been "the most rewarding of everything" he'd done to date. Philip described the quartet as "a complete command of the material he had been working and reworking since the start of his career". Garner pays particular attention to language, and strives to render the cadence of the Cheshire tongue in modern English. This he explains by the sense of anger he felt on reading Sir Gawain and the Green Knight: the footnotes would not have been needed by his father.

In 1981, the literary critic Neil Philip published an analysis of Garner's novels as A Fine Anger, which was based on his doctoral thesis, produced for the University of London in 1980. In this study he noted that "The Stone Book quartet marks a watershed in Garner's writing career, and provides a suitable moment for an evaluation of his work thus far."

=== Strandloper, Thursbitch, Boneland, Where Shall We Run To? and Treacle Walker: 1996–present ===
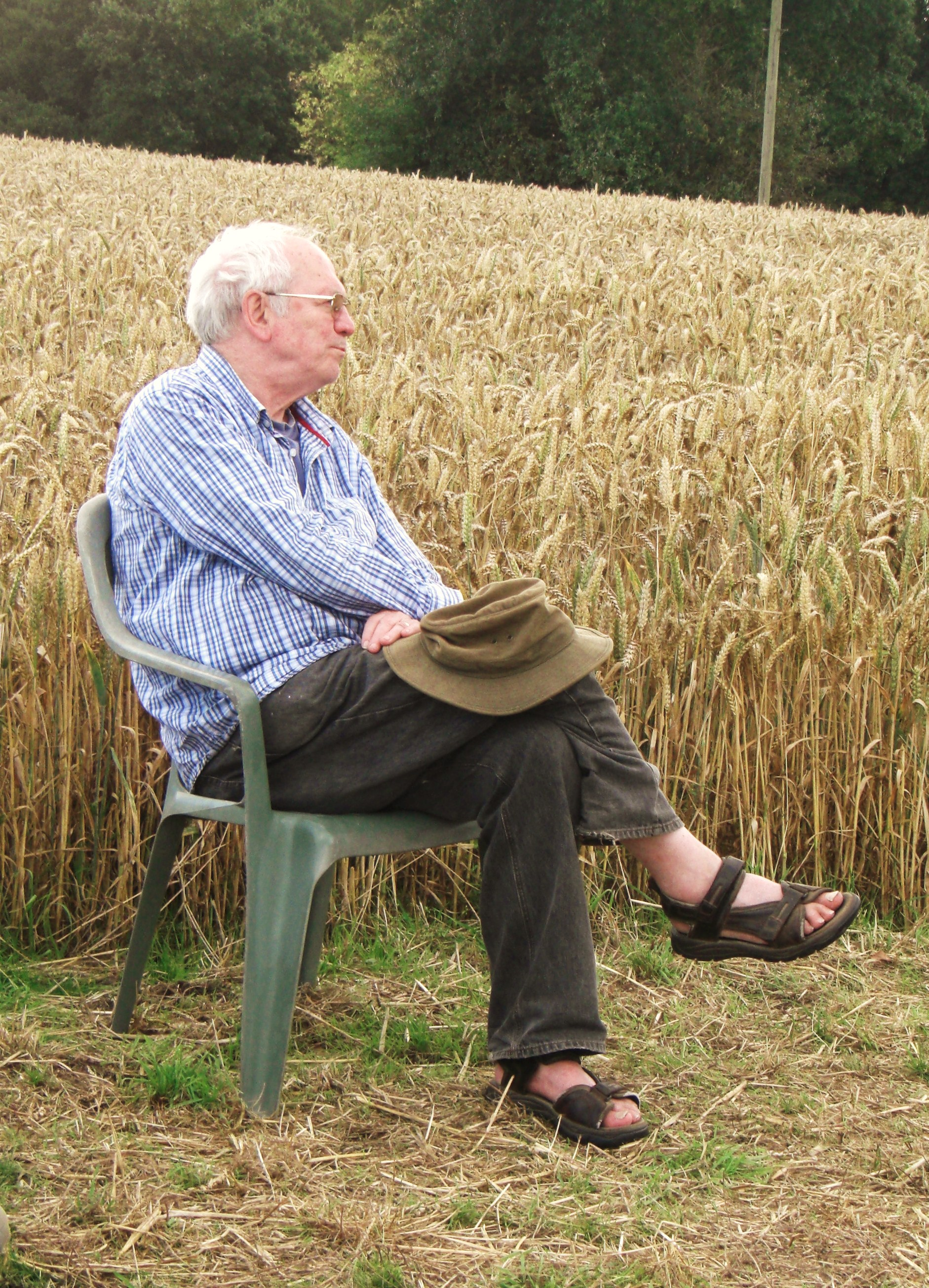
Garner at his home in Blackden, 2011

In 1996, Garner's novel Strandloper was published.

In 1997, he next wrote The Voice That Thunders, a collection of essays and public talks that contains much autobiographical material (including an account of his life with bipolar disorder), as well as critical reflection upon folklore and language, literature and education, the nature of myth and time. In The Voice That Thunders, he reveals the commercial pressure placed upon him during the decade-long drought which preceded Strandloper to 'forsake "literature", and become instead a "popular" writer, cashing in on my established name by producing sequels to, and making series of, the earlier books'. Garner feared that "making series ... would render sterile the existing work, the life that produced it, and bring about my artistic and spiritual death" and felt unable to comply.

Garner's novel Thursbitch was published in 2003.

The novel Boneland was published in 2012, nominally completing a trilogy begun some 50 years earlier with The Weirdstone of Brisingamen.

In August 2018, Garner published his first set of memoirs, Where Shall We Run To?, which describes his childhood during the Second World War.

The novel Treacle Walker was published in October 2021 and nominated to the shortlist for the 2022 Booker Prize.

In October 2024, a week before his 90th birthday, Garner published a second set of memoirs, Powsels and Thrums, framed and inspired by his grandfather. This book contains short essays on a variety of people and events in Garner's life from his starting at Manchester Grammar in 1946 through to his discovery of Alderley Edge in the 1950s, interspersed with poems.

== Personal life ==
With his first wife Ann Cook he had three children. In 1972, he married for a second time, this time to Griselda Greaves, a teacher and critic with whom he had two children. In a 2014 interview conducted with Mike Pitts for British Archaeology magazine, Garner stated that "I don't have anything to do with the literary world. I avoid writers. I don't like them. Most of my close personal friends are professional archaeologists."

== Literary style ==
"I have four filing cabinets of correspondence from readers, and over the years the message is clear and unwavering. Readers under the age of eighteen read what I write with more passion, understanding, and clarity of perception than do adults. Adults bog down, claim that I'm difficult, obscurantist, wilful, and sometimes simply trying to confuse. I'm not; I'm just trying to get the simple story simply told... I didn't consciously set out to write for children, but somehow I connect with them. I think that's something to do with my psychopathology, and I'm not equipped to evaluate it."

— Alan Garner, 1989

Although Garner's early work is often labelled as "children's literature", Garner himself rejects such a description, informing one interviewer that "I certainly have never written for children" but that instead, he has always written purely for himself. Neil Philip, in his critical study of Garner's work (1981), commented that up until that point "Everything Alan Garner has published has been published for children", although he went on to relate that "It may be that Garner's is a case" where the division between children's and adults' literature is "meaningless" and that his fiction is instead "enjoyed by a type of person, no matter what their age." He said "An adult point of view would not give me the ability to be as fresh in my vision as a child's point of view, because the child is still discovering the universe and many adults are not."

Philip offered the opinion that the "essence of his work" was "the struggle to render the complex in simple, bare terms; to couch the abstract in the concrete and communicate it directly to the reader". He added that Garner's work is "intensely autobiographical, in both obvious and subtle ways". Highlighting Garner's use of mythological and folkloric sources, Philip stated that his work explores "the disjointed and troubled psychological and emotional landscape of the twentieth century through the symbolism of myth and folklore." He also expressed the opinion that "Time is Garner's most consistent theme".

The English author and academic Catherine Butler noted that Garner was attentive to the "geological, archaeological and cultural history of his settings, and careful to integrate his fiction with the physical reality beyond the page." As a part of this, Garner had included maps of Alderley Edge in both The Weirdstone of Brisingamen and The Moon of Gomrath. Garner has spent much time investigating the areas that he deals with in his books; writing in the Times Literary Supplement in 1968, Garner commented that in preparation for writing his book Elidor:

I had to read extensively textbooks on physics, Celtic symbolism, unicorns, medieval watermarks, megalithic archaeology; study the writings of Jung; brush up my Plato; visit Avebury, Silbury and Coventry Cathedral; spend a lot of time with demolition gangs on slum clearance sites; and listen to the whole of Britten's War Requiem nearly every day.

== Recognition and legacy ==
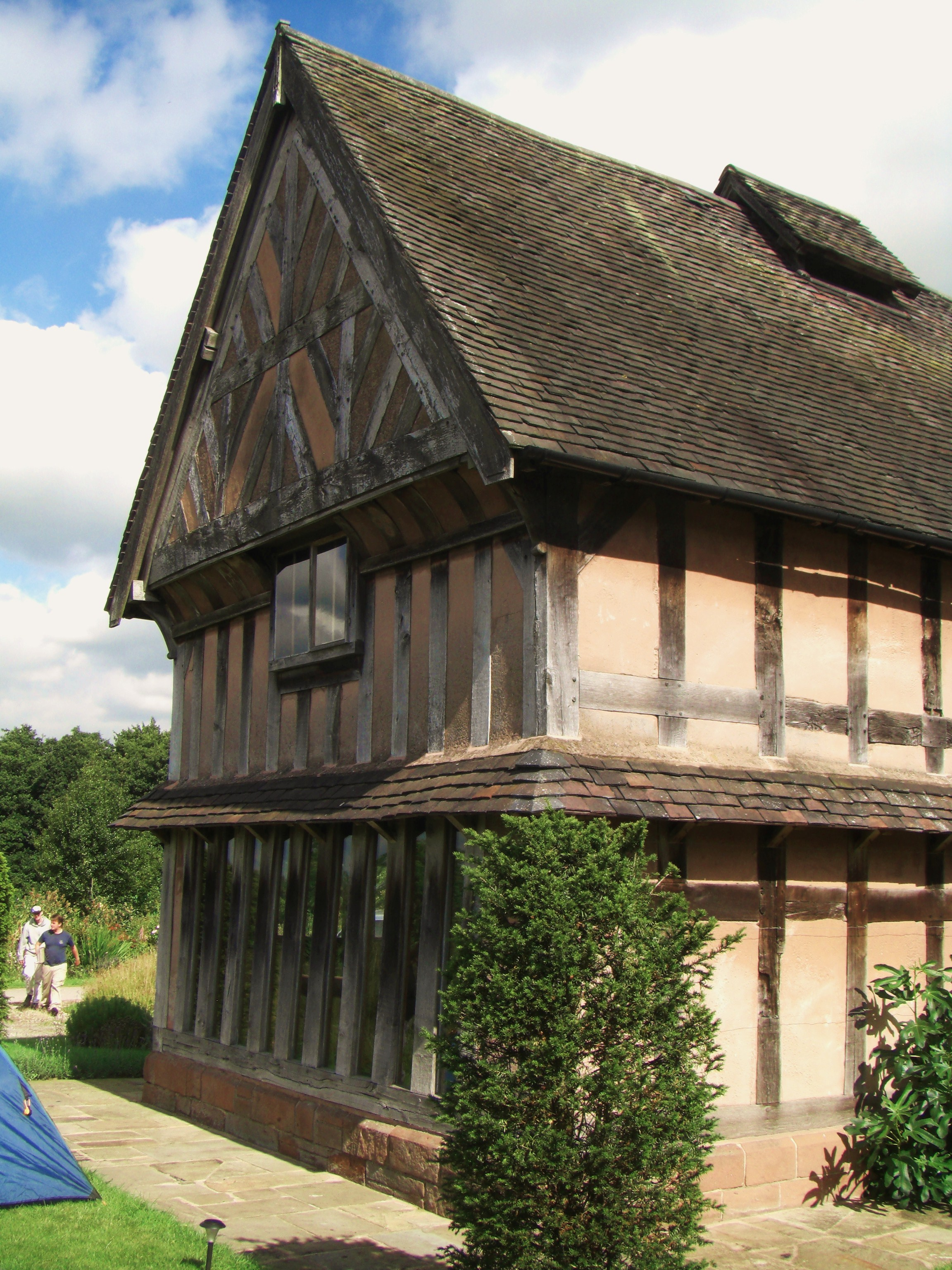
The Medicine House, an Early Modern building that was moved to Blackden by Garner.

In a paper published in the Children's Literature Association Quarterly, Maria Nikolajeva characterised Garner as "one of the most controversial" authors of modern children's literature.

In the fiftieth anniversary edition of The Weirdstone of Brisingamen, published by HarperCollins in 2010, several notable British fantasists praised Garner and his work. Susan Cooper wrote that "The power and range of Alan Garner's astounding talent has grown with every book he's written", and David Almond called him one of Britain's "greatest writers" whose works "really matter". Philip Pullman, the author of the His Dark Materials trilogy, went further:

Garner is indisputably the great originator, the most important British writer of fantasy since Tolkien, and in many respects better than Tolkien, because deeper and more truthful... Any country except Britain would have long ago recognised his importance, and celebrated it with postage stamps and statues and street-names. But that's the way with us: our greatest prophets go unnoticed by the politicians and the owners of media empires. I salute him with the most heartfelt respect and admiration.

Another British fantasy writer, Neil Gaiman, claimed that "Garner's fiction is something special" in that it was "smart and challenging, based in the here and the now, in which real English places emerged from the shadows of folklore, and in which people found themselves walking, living and battling their way through the dreams and patterns of myth." Praise also came from Nick Lake, the editorial director of HarperCollins Children's Books, who proclaimed that "Garner is, quite simply, one of the greatest and most influential writers this country has ever produced." Emma Donoghue recalls reading Red Shift as a teenager: "It looked like other Garners I had read: a children's fantasy. But Red Shift, with its passionately bickering adolescent lovers and vertiginous plunges through the wormhole of time, shook me to my core every time I read it, and still does... Garner makes the past numinous, terrifyingly real: anything but passed."

=== Awards ===
The biennial Hans Christian Andersen Award conferred by the International Board on Books for Young People is the highest recognition available to a writer or illustrator of children's books. Garner was the sole runner-up for the writing award in 1978.

Garner was appointed Officer of the Order of the British Empire (OBE) for services to literature in the 2001 New Year's Honours list. He received the British Fantasy Society's occasional Karl Edward Wagner Award in 2003 and the World Fantasy Award for Life Achievement in 2012. In January 2011, the University of Warwick awarded the degree of Doctor of Letters (honoris causa). On that occasion he gave a half-hour interview about his work. He has also been awarded honorary doctorates from the University of Salford (2011) and the University of Huddersfield in (2012). He was elected a Fellow of the Royal Society of Literature in 2012.

He has been recognised several times for particular works.

- The Owl Service (1967) won both the Carnegie Medal and the Guardian Children's Fiction Prize, For the 70th anniversary of the Carnegie in 2007 it was named one of the top ten Medal-winning works, selected by a panel to compose the ballot for a public election of the all-time favourite.
- The Weirdstone of Brisingamen (1960) was named to the Lewis Carroll Shelf Award list by the University of Wisconsin–Madison School of Education in 1970, denoting that it "belongs on the same shelf" with the 1865 classic Alice in Wonderland and its sequel.
- The Stone Book (1976), first in the Stone Book series, won the 1996 Phoenix Award as the best English-language children's book that did not win a major award when it was originally published twenty years earlier.
- The 1981 film Images won First Prize at the Chicago International Film Festival
- Treacle Walker was shortlisted for the 2022 Booker Prize, making Garner the oldest writer nominated at the time.

== Television, radio, and other adaptations ==
- The Weirdstone of Brisingamen was dramatised in 6 30-minute parts by Nan Macdonald for the BBC's Home Service broadcast in November 1963.
- Elidor was read in instalments by John Stride for the BBC's Jackanory programme in June 1968.
- The Owl Service (1969), a British TV series transmitted by Granada Television based on Garner's novel of the same name.
- A second adaptation of Elidor was read on a BBC Radio 4 in July 1972.
- Red Shift (BBC, transmitted 17 January 1978); directed by John Mackenzie; part of the BBC's Play for Today series.
- To Kill a King (1980), part of the BBC series of plays on supernatural themes, Leap in the Dark: an atmospheric story about a writer overcoming depression and writer's block. The hero's home appears to be Garner's own house.
- The Keeper (ITV, transmitted 13 June 1983), an episode of the ITV children's series Dramarama: Spooky series
- Garner and Don Webb adapted Elidor as a BBC children's television series shown in 1995, comprising six half-hour episodes, starring Damian Zuk as Roland and Suzanne Shaw as Helen.
- The Owl Service was adapted for the stage in 2004 by The Drum Theatre in Plymouth.
- Elidor was dramatised as a radio play in four-parts by Don Webb, broadcast on BBC Radio 4 Extra in 2011.

== Works ==
=== Novels ===
- The Weirdstone of Brisingamen, 1960
- The Moon of Gomrath, 1963
- Elidor, 1965
- The Owl Service, 1967
- Red Shift, 1973
- Strandloper, 1996
- Thursbitch, 2003
- Boneland, 2012
- Treacle Walker, 2021

=== Short story collections ===
- The Hamish Hamilton Book of Goblins, 1969
- The Guizer: A Book of Fools, 1975
- The Stone Book Quartet, 1979
- The Lad of the Gad, 1980
- Fairytales of Gold, 1980, (Illustrated by Michael Foreman)
- Book of British Fairy Tales, 1984, (Illustrated by Derek Collard)
- A Bag of Moonshine, 1986, (Illustrated by P. J. Lynch)
- Once Upon a Time, 1993
- Collected Folk Tales, 2011

=== Other books ===
- Holly from the Bongs: A Nativity Play, 1966
- The Old Man of Mow, 1967
- The Breadhorse, 1975
- Jack and the Beanstalk, 1992, (Illustrated by Julek Heller)
- The Little Red Hen, 1997
- The Well of the Wind, 1998
- Grey Wolf, Prince Jack and the Firebird, 1998
- The Voice That Thunders, 1997
- Where Shall We Run To?, 2018
- Powsels and Thrums, 2024
