= Listed buildings in Bosley =

Bosley is a civil parish in Cheshire East, England. It contains 28 buildings that are recorded in the National Heritage List for England as designated listed buildings. Of these, one is listed at Grade II*, the middle grade, and the others are at Grade II. The parish is almost entirely rural. The major structure passing through the parish is the Macclesfield Canal, and 18 of the listed buildings are associated with the canal, namely 11 of the 12 Bosley Locks (lock number 6 is in North Rode parish), four bridges, an aqueduct, a milestone, and a distance marker. Also in the parish is Bosley Reservoir, and there are two listed structures associated with this. The other listed buildings are farmhouses, two bridges over the River Dane, a public house, a school, a church, and a sundial.

== Key ==
Grade	Criteria
II*	Particularly important buildings of more than special interest
II	Buildings of national importance and special interest

== Buildings ==
Name and location	Photograph	Date	Notes	Grade
Church of St Mary the Virgin; 53.18694°N 2.12396°W		c. 1500	The oldest part of the church is the Perpendicular sandstone tower with its battlemented parapet. The rest of the church was rebuilt in 1777 in brick, and the chancel was added in 1834. The windows in the nave have slightly pointed heads, and those in the chancel are lancets.	II*
Stiles Meadow Farmhouse; 53.18216°N 2.10681°W	—	Early to mid-17th century	The farmhouse was extended in the 18th and the 20th centuries. The earlier part is timber-framed with brick nogging on a stone plinth, and the later part is in stone. The roofs are in Kerridge stone-slate. The farmhouse has 1½ storeys, and is in three one-bay portions. The left portion is in stone, and the other portions are timber-framed. In the centre is a timber-framed porch. Inside the farmhouse is an inglenook.	II
Mill House Farmhouse; 53.18070°N 2.11766°W	—	17th century	The farmhouse was extended in the 18th century, and an extension was added in 1929. The early part has a timber-framed core. The whole building is in brick with roofs in Kerridge stone-slate and tiles. The farmhouse is in two storeys, the windows are casements, and inside is an inglenook.	II
Hug Bridge; 53.16933°N 2.10526°W	—	Early 19th century	The bridge carries the A523 road over the River Dane. It is constructed in stone, and consists of a single arch. It has a parapet with half-round coping extending to half-round piers.	II
Queen's Arms Inn; 53.18695°N 2.12319°W		Early 19th century	A public house built in brick on a sandstone plinth with a slate roof. It is in two storeys with an attic, and has a symmetrical front. In the centre is a doorway flanked by windows, and there are three windows in the upper floor; all these windows are sashes. There is an arched window in the attic in each end gable.	II
Lymford Bridge; 53.18286°N 2.13287°W		Early 19th century (probable)	The bridge carries Tunstall Road over the River Dane. It is constructed in sandstone and consists of a single wide segmental arch. It has lightly tooled parapets and rounded copings. There is a raised pavement on the south side.	II
Sundial; 53.18683°N 2.12397°W		Early 19th century (probable)	The sundial is in the churchyard of the Church of St Mary the Virgin. It consists of a short tapered gritstone shaft on a red sandstone base. On the top is a copper dial carved with the churchwardens' initials. The gnomon is missing.	II
Dane Aqueduct; 53.18446°N 2.14148°W		c. 1830	The aqueduct carries the Macclesfield Canal at a height of about 45 feet (14 m) over the River Dane. It is constructed in sandstone, and consists of a single semicircular arch with a span of about 35 feet (11 m). It has stone coped parapets, and railings between balusters that are capped with urns.	II
Bridge near Reservoir Dam; 53.18642°N 2.11160°W		c. 1830	The bridge carries Smithy Lane over a conduit from Bosley Reservoir. It is constructed in sandstone, and consists of a single horseshoe elliptical arch. The parapets have projecting copings and end in square piers.	II
Canal milestone 53.20181°N 2.14188°W		c. 1830	The milestone stands by the Macclesfield Canal. It is in sandstone and is inscribed with the distances in miles to Hall Green and Marple.	II
Distance marker 53.20513°N 2.14023°W		c. 1830	The distance stone stands by the towpath of the Macclesfield Canal. It is a rectangular slab of sandstone inscribed with "1/2" on the south face and "3/4" on the north face.	II
Valve House; 53.18543°N 2.11397°W		c. 1830	The valve house controls the flow of water from Bosley Reservoir to the Macclesfield Canal, the engineer for which was William Crosley. It is constructed in gritstone, and is tunnel vaulted with a semicircular entrance. Stone wing walls lead down to the sluiceway.	II
Bosley lock number 1 and spillway 53.19991°N 2.14333°W		1831	A lock and spillway on the Macclesfield Canal, the engineer for which was William Crosley. The lock is constructed in gritstone, the gates are timber. A cast-iron footbridge crosses the lock. To the west of the lock is a spillway.	II
Bosley lock number 2 and lock pound 53.19666°N 2.14494°W		1831	A lock and pound on the Macclesfield Canal, the engineer for which was William Crosley. The lock is constructed in gritstone, the upper gates are steel, the lower are timber. A cast-iron footbridge crosses the lock. To the west of the lock is a rectangular pound.	II
Bosley lock number 3 and lock pound 53.19579°N 2.14536°W		1831	A lock and pound on the Macclesfield Canal, the engineer for which was William Crosley. The lock is constructed in gritstone, the gates are steel. A cast-iron footbridge crosses the lock. To the west of the lock is a rectangular pound.	II
Bosley lock number 4 and lock pound 53.19481°N 2.14525°W		1831	A lock and pound on the Macclesfield Canal, the engineer for which was William Crosley. The lock is constructed in gritstone, the upper gates are steel, the lower are timber. A cast-iron footbridge crosses the lock. To the west of the lock is a rectangular pound.	II
Bosley lock number 5 and lock pound 53.19387°N 2.14487°W		1831	A lock and pound on the Macclesfield Canal, the engineer for which was William Crosley. The lock is constructed in gritstone, the upper gates are steel, the lower are timber. A cast-iron footbridge crosses the lock. To the west of the lock is a rectangular pound.	II
Bosley lock number 7 and lock pound 53.18985°N 2.14275°W		1831	A lock and pound on the Macclesfield Canal, the engineer for which was William Crosley. The lock is constructed in gritstone, the upper gates are timber, the lower are steel. A cast-iron footbridge crosses the lock. To the west of the lock is a rectangular pound.	II
Bosley lock number 8 and lock pound 53.18901°N 2.14177°W		1831	A lock and pound on the Macclesfield Canal, the engineer for which was William Crosley. The lock is constructed in gritstone, the upper gates are steel, the lower are timber. A cast-iron footbridge crosses the lock. To the west of the lock is a rectangular pound.	II
Bosley lock number 9 and lock pound 53.18838°N 2.14072°W		1831	A lock and pound on the Macclesfield Canal, the engineer for which was William Crosley. The lock is constructed in gritstone, the upper gates are steel, the lower are timber. A cast-iron footbridge crosses the lock. To the west of the lock is a rectangular pound.	II
Bosley lock number 10 and lock pound 53.18767°N 2.13942°W		1831	A lock and pound on the Macclesfield Canal, the engineer for which was William Crosley. The lock is constructed in gritstone, the gates are in steel. A cast-iron footbridge crosses the lock. To the west of the lock is a rectangular pound.	II
Bosley lock number 11 and lock pound 53.18713°N 2.13867°W		1831	A lock and pound on the Macclesfield Canal, the engineer for which was William Crosley. The lock is constructed in gritstone, the upper gates are steel, the lower are timber. A cast-iron footbridge crosses the lock. To the west of the lock is a rectangular pound.	II
Bosley lock number 12 and lock pound 53.18640°N 2.13874°W		1831	A lock and pound on the Macclesfield Canal, the engineer for which was William Crosley. The lock is constructed in gritstone, the upper gates are timber, the lower are steel. A cast-iron footbridge crosses the lock. To the west of the lock is a rectangular pound.	II
Canal bridge number 53; 53.20162°N 2.14198°W		1831	This is an accommodation bridge over the Macclesfield Canal, the engineer for which was William Crosley. It is constructed in gritstone, and consists of a single horseshoe elliptical arch. The bridge has parapets with plain coping that end in square piers.	II
Canal bridge number 54; 53.19968°N 2.14344°W		1831	The bridge carries Station Road over the Macclesfield Canal, the engineer for which was William Crosley. It is constructed in gritstone, and consists of a single horseshoe elliptical arch. The bridge has parapets with plain coping that end in square piers.	II
Canal bridge number 55; 53.19365°N 2.14477°W		1831	The bridge carries the A54 road over the Macclesfield Canal, the engineer for which was William Crosley. It is constructed in gritstone, and consists of a single horseshoe elliptical arch. The bridge has parapets with plain coping that end in square piers.	II
Canal bridge number 56; 53.18887°N 2.14153°W		1831	This is an accommodation bridge over the Macclesfield Canal, the engineer for which was William Crosley. It is constructed in gritstone, and consists of a single horseshoe elliptical arch. The bridge has parapets with plain coping that end in square piers.	II
School and Schoolmaster's House; 53.18806°N 2.12330°W		1858	The school and attached house are in brick with tiled roofs. They have an H-shaped plan, the right leg constituting the school hall, the left leg the two-storey house, and the two-storey cross wing being shared. Features include cast-iron lattice windows, a gabled oriel window, a bellcote, and finials. At the rear is another schoolroom built in 1897 to celebrate Queen Victoria's Diamond Jubilee.	II

== See also ==
- Listed buildings in Congleton
- Listed buildings in Gawsworth
- Listed buildings in Heaton, Staffordshire
- Listed buildings in North Rode
- Listed buildings in Rushton, Staffordshire
- Listed buildings in Sutton
- Listed buildings in Wincle
