= Listed buildings in Wincle =

Wincle is a civil parish in Cheshire East, England. It contains 25 buildings that are recorded in the National Heritage List for England as designated listed buildings. Of these, one is listed at Grade II*, the middle of the three grades, and the others are at Grade II. The parish is in the Peak District National Park. It lies in the foothills of the Pennines and, apart from small settlements, is entirely rural. Most of the listed buildings are farmhouses and farm buildings, or houses. Six parish boundary stones are listed. The other listed buildings include bridges, a church, and a school with an attached master's house.

== Key ==
| Grade | Criteria |
|---|---|
| II* | Particularly important buildings of more than special interest |
| II | Buildings of national importance and special interest |

== Buildings ==
| Name and location | Photograph | Date | Notes | Grade |
|---|---|---|---|---|
| Wincle Grange; 53.18575°N 2.06802°W | | Mid 14th century | Originating as a grange to Combermere Abbey, it has been much altered. Most of the visible features date from the 15th century. The building is in sandstone and has roofs of Kerridge stone-slate. Most of it is in two storeys; some wings also have an attic. The windows are mullioned. | II* |
| Barleigh Ford Farmhouse; 53.17385°N 2.08153°W | — | 17th century (or earlier) | The farmhouse has a timber-framed core that was later encased in brick and stone. It has been rendered, and has a Kerridge stone-slate roof. The farmhouse is in two storeys, and has a front containing four three-light mullioned windows. There is also a 20th-century gabled porch. The interior is understood to contain a pair of crucks and an inglenook hoodbeam dated 1635. | II |
| Lane House Farmhouse; 53.19062°N 2.06295°W | — | Early 17th century (probable) | The farmhouse is built in sandstone and has a Kerridge stone-slate roof. It is in 1 1/2 storeys. The windows vary and most of them are mullioned. | II |
| White Lee Farmhouse; 53.17702°N 2.06874°W | | Early 17th century | The farmhouse was altered and extended in the 19th century. It is built in sandstone and has Kerridge stone-slate roofs. The farmhouse consists of a cross-gable and a wing, the wing having two storeys, and the cross-gable also an attic. In the walls of the wing are remnants of timber-framing. The windows are mullioned and contain casements. | II |
| Hawkslee Farmhouse; 53.18481°N 2.09278°W | — | 17th century | The farmhouse was altered in the 18th and 20th centuries. It is built in brick with some stone dressings, the front bring rendered, and has a roof of Kerridge stone-slate. The house has a symmetrical front in two storeys with an attic, and has two windows in each floor. | II |
| Little Chapter; 53.19186°N 2.06381°W | — | Late 17th century | A stone house with a Kerridge stone-slate roof in two storeys. To the left is a gabled bay with one window in each storey. To the right are two windows in each storey and a doorway to the right. The windows are mullioned and contain diamond leaded glazing. Inside the house is an inglenook. | II |
| Farm building (southwest), Wincle Grange; 53.18553°N 2.06816°W | — | Late 17th century (probable) | The farm building, which has been altered, is in sandstone and has been re-roofed with Staffordshire blue clay tiles. It was originally in two storeys, but the upper floor has been removed. The building has been used in the past for various purposes, including as accommodation and as a chapel. It contains four door openings. | II |
| Hammerton Farmhouse; 53.19292°N 2.05923°W | — | Early 18th century | The farmhouse is in gritstone with a Kerridge stone-slate roof. It has a double pile plan, is in two storeys, and has a three-bay front. The windows have three lights and are mullioned, other than a round-headed single-light window above the doorway. | II |
| Hillside; 53.19191°N 2.06398°W | | Early 18th century (probable) | A stone cottage with a Kerridge stone-slate roof in two storeys. It has a central doorway, with two windows in each floor. The windows are mullioned and contain diamond leaded glazing. | II |
| Barn, Allgreave Farm; 53.19992°N 2.04288°W | — | Early 18th century (probable) | The barn is built in gritstone and has a roof partly in Kerridge stone-slate, and partly in corrugated asbestos. Along the front are loophope ventilators, and elsewhere are doorways with stone lintels. | II |
| Shippon, Allgreave Farm; 53.19981°N 2.04341°W | — | 1736 | The shippon is built in gritstone and has a Kerridge stone-slate roof. It is in two storeys, and contains doorways, pitch holes, and hopper windows. Above a former doorway is a datestone. | II |
| Allgreave Farmhouse; 53.20006°N 2.04335°W | — | 1742 | The farmhouse is in gritstone, with the front colourwashed, and it has a Kerridge stone-slate roof. It has an L-shaped plan, with a gabled wing to the right. The house is in two storeys, and has three windows on the main front. Also on the front is a gabled timber porch, and above the door is a datestone. Inside the house is an inglenook. | II |
| Farm building (west), Wincle Grange; 53.18584°N 2.06833°W | — | Late 18th century (probable) | The farm building was altered in the 19th century. It is built in sandstone with a Kerridge stone-slate roof, and is in two storeys. The building contains doorways, ventilators, and rectangular pitch holes. | II |
| St Michael's Church; 53.19173°N 2.06336°W | | c. 1858 | The oldest surviving part of an older church is the tower, the rest of the church being rebuilt in 1882 by Edward Witts. It is built in gritstone and has a tiled roof. At the west end is the battlemented tower. The body of the church is without aisles and extends for five bays. Over the priest's door is a lintel from the older church dated 1647. | II |
| Dane Feeder Cottage; 53.17254°N 2.06970°W | — | 1825 (or earlier) | The cottage was built for employees of the Trent and Mersey Canal Company. It is in sandstone with a clay tile roof, and was extended later in the century. The cottage is in two storeys, and contains casement windows. | II |
| Farm building, Wincle Grange; 53.18562°N 2.06767°W | — | Early 19th century (probable) | The farm building is in sandstone with a roof of Kerridge stone-slate that has been partly replaced by Staffordshire clay tiles. It contains openings including a cart entrance (now blocked), doors, windows, and ventilators. | II |
| Parish boundary stone 53.20772°N 2.06735°W | — | 1849 | The parish boundary stone has a rectangular plan and a semicircular top. It is inscribed with the initials "S" (for Sutton), "W" (for Wincle), and the year (twice). | II |
| Parish boundary stone 53.21018°N 2.06345°W | — | 1849 | The parish boundary stone has a rectangular plan and a semicircular top. It is inscribed with the initials "S" (for Sutton), "W" (for Wincle), and the year (twice). | II |
| Parish boundary stone 53.21173°N 2.06095°W | — | 1849 | The parish boundary stone has a rectangular plan and a semicircular top. It is inscribed with the initials "S" (for Sutton), "W" (for Wincle), and the year (twice). | II |
| Parish boundary stone 53.20938°N 2.06595°W | — | 1849 | The parish boundary stone has a rectangular plan and a semicircular top. It is inscribed with the initials "S" (for Sutton), "W" (for Wincle), and the year (twice). | II |
| Parish boundary stone 53.21128°N 2.05815°W | — | 1849 | The parish boundary stone has a rectangular plan and a semicircular top. It is inscribed with the initials "S" (for Sutton), "W" (for Wincle), and the year (twice). | II |
| Parish boundary stone 53.21048°N 2.06310°W | — | 1849 | The parish boundary stone has a rectangular plan and an arched top. It is inscribed with the initials "S" (for Sutton), "W" (for Wincle), and the year (twice). | II |
| Allgreave Bridge; 53.20118°N 2.04623°W | | 1855 | The bridge carries the A54 road over Clough Brook. It is built in gritstone and consists of a single semicircular arch with a span of 30 feet (9.1 m). | II |
| Dane Bridge; 53.18357°N 2.05325°W | | 1869 | The bridge carries a road over the River Dane. It is built in gritstone and consists of a single wide segmental arch. The bridge has plain parapets, and at the ends of the abutments are buttresses. | II |
| School and schoolmaster's house 53.19181°N 2.06282°W | | 1865 | The primary school and master's house are constructed in gritstone with tiled roofs. The school is in a single storey, and has a hall of four bays, a gabled porch, and mullioned and transomed windows. The window in the left gable contains Geometrical tracery, and on the roof is a flèche. The attached house is in two storeys. | II |

== See also ==
- Listed buildings in Sutton, Cheshire East
- Listed buildings in Macclesfield Forest and Wildboarclough
- Listed buildings in Leekfrith
- Listed buildings in Heaton, Staffordshire
- Listed buildings in Bosley
