= North Rode Manor =

Country house in Cheshire, England

Coordinates: 53.20043°N 2.16237°W

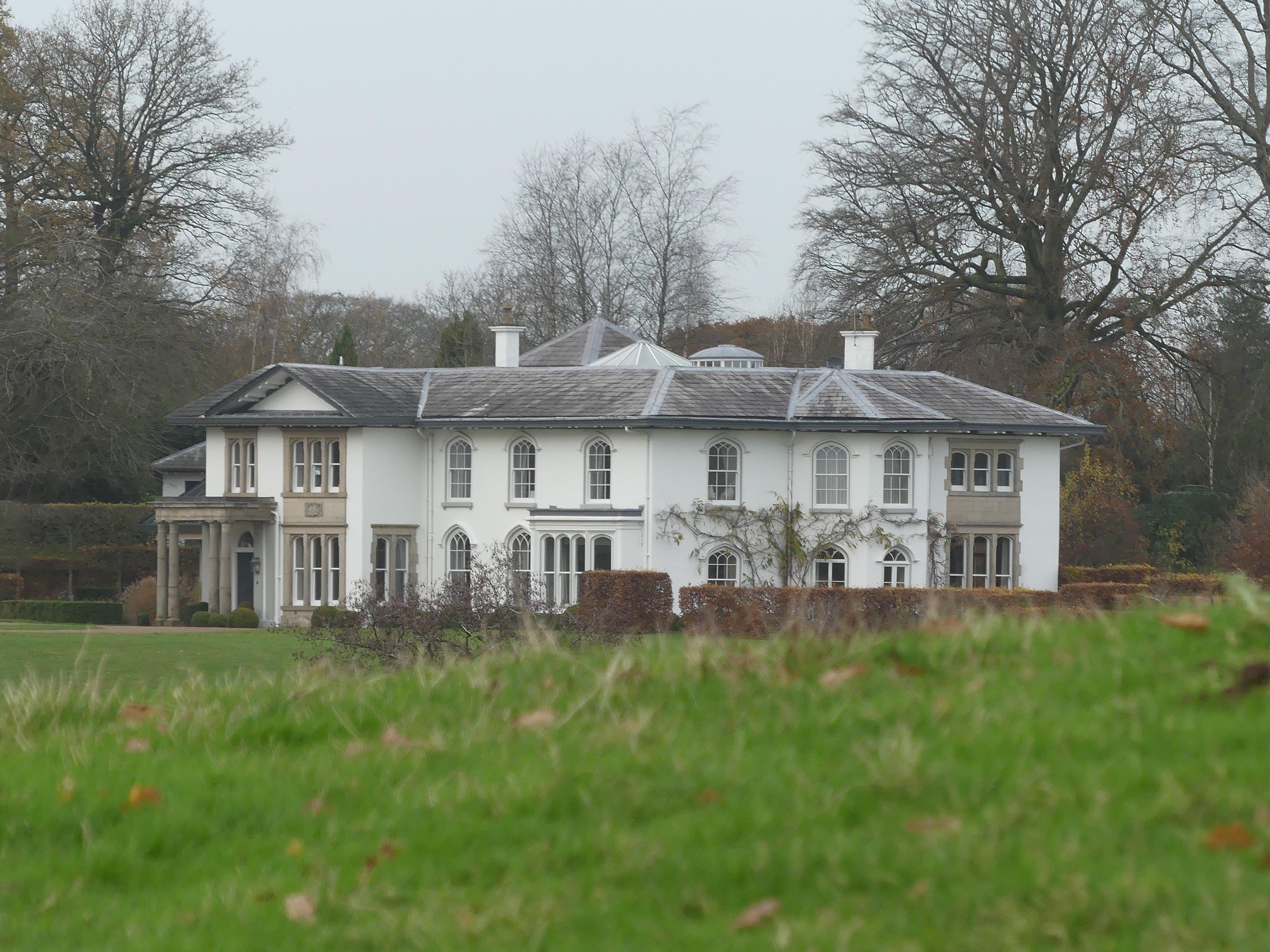
Distant view of North Rode Manor from the south-east

North Rode Manor is a country house standing to the north of the village of North Rode, Cheshire, England. The house was built between 1838 and 1840 for John Smith Daintry, a banker and silk manufacturer from Macclesfield, on the site of an earlier house that had been destroyed by fire. Alterations have been carried out since it was originally built. The house is constructed in stuccoed brick with ashlar dressings and slate roofs. It is in two storeys. The entrance front has five bays, the two on the left protruding forwards. The entrance porch dates from the 19th-century and is supported by paired Tuscan columns. To the right of this is a canted bay window. On the right side of the house is another canted bay window, and on the left side is a tower with a pyramidal roof. The house is recorded in the National Heritage List for England as a designated Grade II listed building. The authors of the Buildings of England series describe it a "sprawling white house in Regency Gothic".

The present porch replaces the one originally on the house that has been moved and is now a free-standing folly in the garden. This is listed at Grade II. Also listed at Grade II are the former stables, now partly converted into a house.

== Daintry family ==
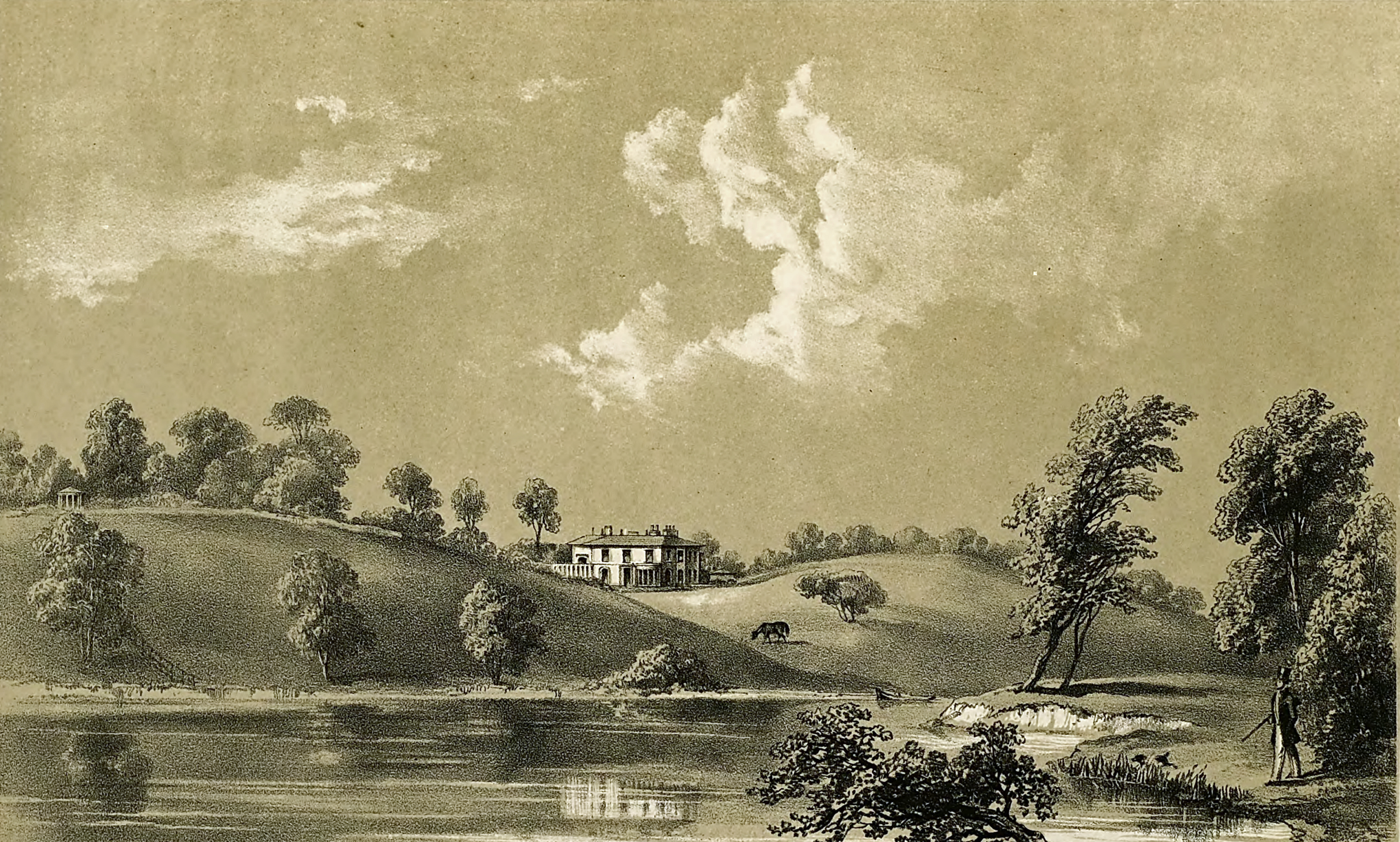
Engraving of the Manor, North Rode, 1850

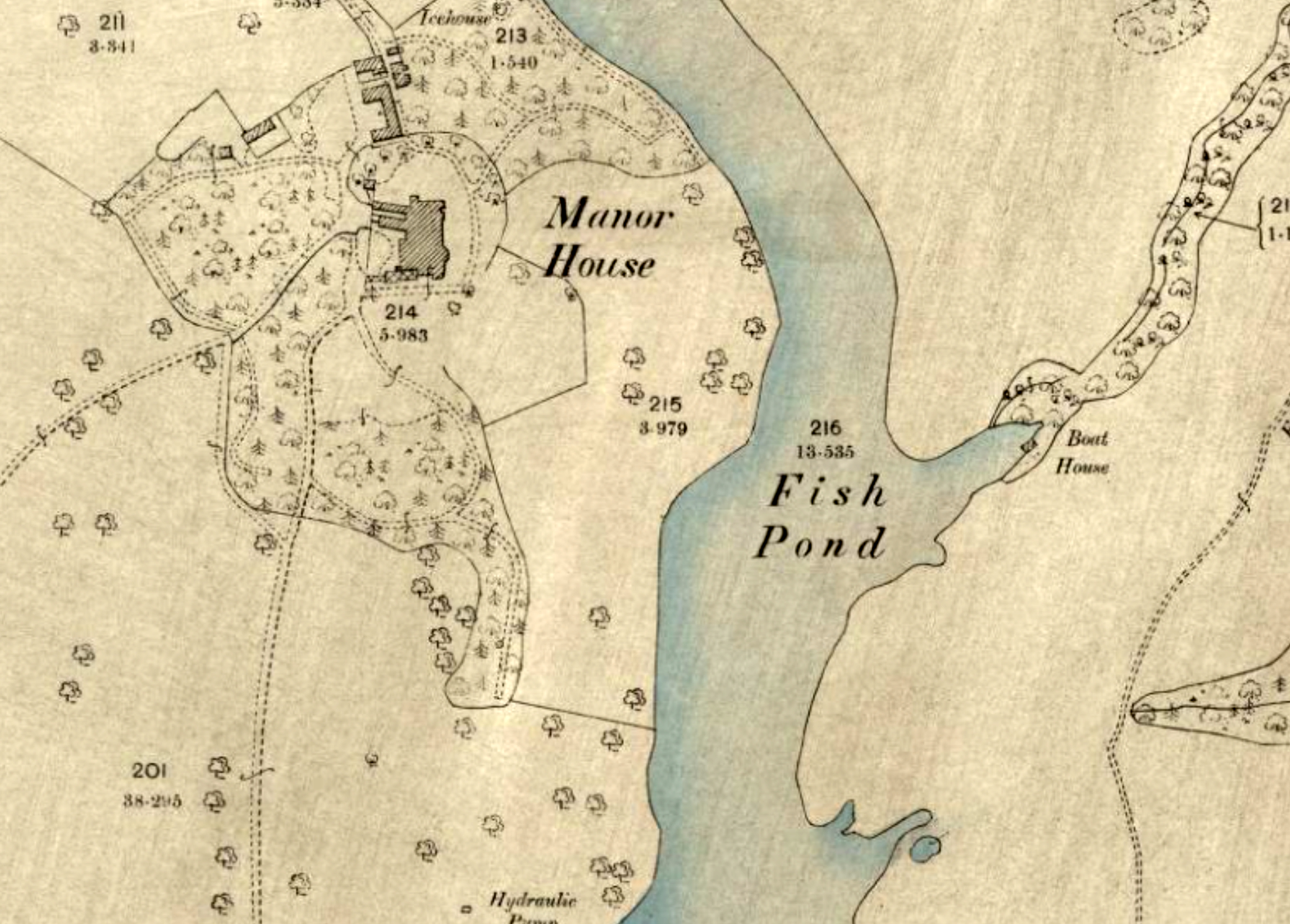
Map of the Manor, North Rode, 1897

John Smith Dainty built The Manor in about 1830. He inherited the North Rode Estate in 1811 from his father Michael Daintry (1732–1811) who had bought it a year earlier. John was a banker and silk manufacturer. He also owned a substantial amount of land in Leek which he had inherited from his aunt. In 1791 he married Elizabeth Ryle, who was the sister of his partner in the banking firm Daintry, Ryle and Co. The couple had five sons and three daughters. In 1825 he was Sheriff of Chester.

In 1829 he sold his land in Leek and it may have been this money which helped to finance the building of the Manor in North Rode some years later. He died in 1848 and his eldest son the Reverend John Daintry inherited the property.

Reverend John Daintry was the rector for several towns in England but after his inheritance in 1848 he became the vicar for North Rode for the next twenty years. In 1850 a lithograph of the Manor was made by Gauci & Butler from the drawing by F. C. Terry. It was included in the book by Twycross called The Mansions of England and Wales.

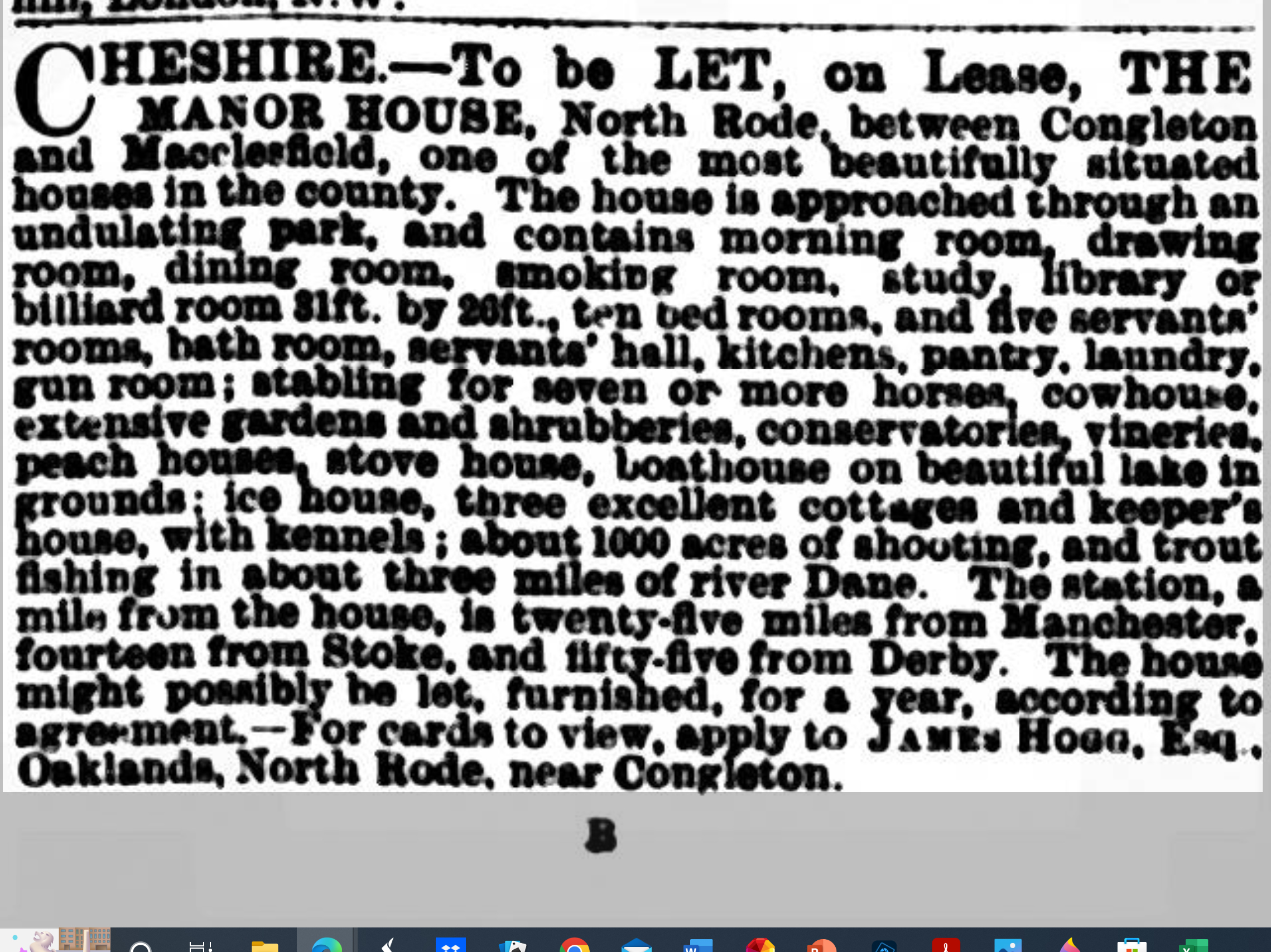
Rental for the Manor, North Rode 1889

In 1821 John married Elizabeth Hext who was the daughter of John Hext of Trenarren in Cornwall. The couple had no children so when John died in 1869 his only surviving younger brother George Smith Daintry (1811–1881) inherited the estate. George was the youngest child in his family and did not expect to inherit. He therefore sought to make his own way in the world and in 1842 went with his wife Mary Ann (nee Hodge) and children to Cobourg in Canada. He owned a fleet of ferry boats and in the 1860s became the Mayor of Cobourg.

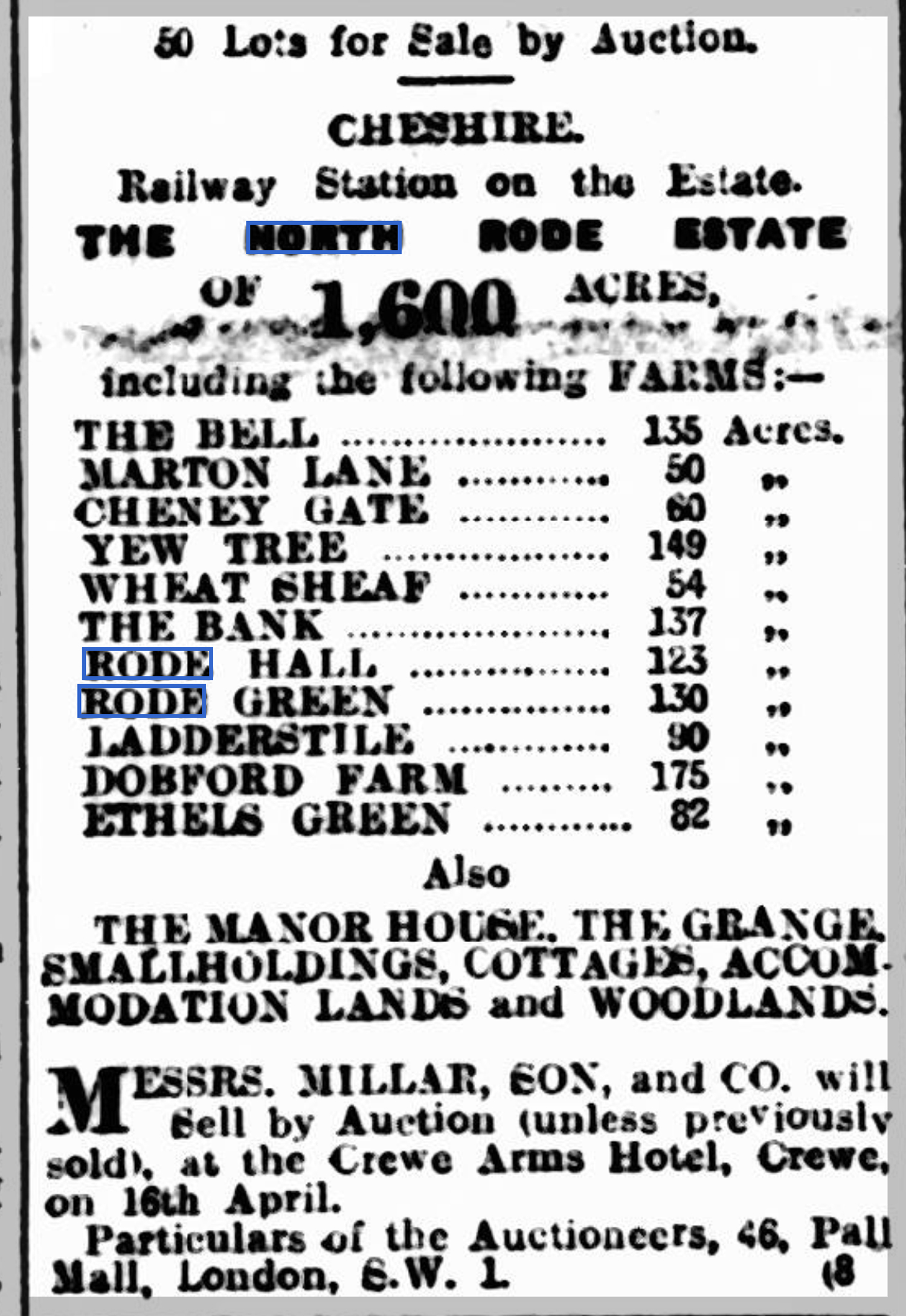
Sale notice for the North Rode Estate in 1923

George returned to England in 1869 and lived on the estate until his death in 1881. His eldest son John Daintry then became the owner. He had remained in Canada for most of his life working as a surveyor and had married a Canadian wife Sarah Louisa Beatty. When he inherited the estate in 1881 it appears that he sometimes visited the property but still mainly lived in Canada. The 1891 Canadian Census recorded him as still living in Cobourg with his family and in 1899 he died there. His eldest son George Percival Daintry became the owner of the Manor in 1899.

George Percival Daintry had returned to North Rode from Canada when he turned 21 in 1892. He appears to have run the estate until he inherited it in 1899. In 1902 he married Dorothy Ridgeway who was the daughter of John Ridgway of Sutton Hall, Cheshire. The couple had four children. The family did not live in the Manor and preferred to rent it to wealthy tenants. They usually lived at Oaklands which was also on the estate. A rental advertisement for the manor is shown.

The most notable tenant who lived in the Manor House was Sir Edward Tootal Broadhurst. With his wife Charlotte, he rented the house from about 1900 until 1923. Broadhurst was one of the largest cotton manufacturers in Manchester. He was also a director of the London and North Western Railway and the chairman of the Manchester and Liverpool District Bank. In 1920 he gave 80 acres of land in Manchester for use as a park. It is now called Broadhurst Park.

George Percival Daintry ran the North Rode Estate until 1923 and then decided to sell the whole property. The reason for the sale as stated in his obituary was high taxes. All of the houses and cottages except Oaklands were put on the market in 50 lots. Many of the tenant farmers bought their own properties. George kept Oaklands and he lived there until his death in 1936. The sale notice is shown.

== See also ==
- Listed buildings in North Rode
