= Listed buildings in Rushton, Staffordshire =

Rushton is a civil parish in the district of Staffordshire Moorlands, Staffordshire, England. It contains 19 listed buildings that are recorded in the National Heritage List for England. Of these, one is at Grade II*, the middle of the three grades, and the others are at Grade II, the lowest grade. The parish contains the village of Rushton Spencer, and is otherwise rural. Most of the listed buildings are farmhouses and farm buildings, the other listed buildings include private houses, a church and items in the churchyard, a chapel, a public house, and a former railway station.

== Key ==
Grade	Criteria
II*	Particularly important buildings of more than special interest
II	Buildings of national importance and special interest

== Buildings ==
Name and location	Photograph	Date	Notes	Grade
St Lawrence's Church; 53.15575°N 2.09968°W		15th century	The church, which is in an isolated position, has a timber framed core, and possibly contains earlier material. Its external walls are in stone, and it has a roof of stone slate. The church consists of a nave, a north aisle with a family pew at the east end, a south porch, a chancel, and a west tower embraced by a vestry and a store. The tower has three stages, the top stage, containing the bell chamber, is weatherboarded, and the gabled roof is shingled. On the south front of the nave are two gabled dormers with finials, and inside the church is a west gallery.	II*
Churchyard cross 53.15564°N 2.09974°W		15th century (probable)	The cross stump is in the churchyard of St Lawrence's Church to the south of the church. It is in sandstone, and has a square plan. The cross consists of a truncated stump set into a socket in small rectangular plinth.	II
Barn southwest of New Hall Farmhouse; 53.14959°N 2.10674°W	—	Late 16th century	The barn, with cruck construction, was later altered. The exterior walls are in stone and brick, and it has a blue tile roof. There are two levels, with a hay loft over a byre. It contains doorways, a loft opening, and chamfer mullion windows. Inside, there is a central cruck truss.	II
Cloud House Farm; 53.17242°N 2.13301°W		1612	The farmhouse, which has been altered and extended, is in stone on a plinth, and has a Welsh slate roof. There are two storeys and an attic, and a T-shaped plan, consisting of a hall and a cross-wing. Some windows are mullioned, some are mullioned and transomed, and there is a gabled dormer. Inside, there is a timber framed cross-wall.	II
Wall Hill Farmhouse; 53.16631°N 2.10036°W	—	1621	The farmhouse was extended in 1839. The original part is timber framed on a sandstone plinth, the later part is roughcast and painted to resemble timber framing, and the roof is tiled. There are two storeys and an attic, and a T-shaped plan, consisting of a hall range and a cross-wing, with a front of three gables. In the angle is a gabled porch that has a Tudor arched doorway with a fanlight and an inscribed panel above. The windows are casements, some with mullions, and there is a large chimney stack that has a cornice with gargoyles at the corners.	II
Hall House; 53.15791°N 2.09980°W	—	Late 17th century	A farmhouse that was altered later, it is in stone with quoins, and has a stone slate roof. There are two storeys and an L-shaped plan, with a lean-to at the left end. Most of the windows have chamfered mullions, and inside there is a timber framed through passage partition.	II
Oxhay Farmhouse; 53.14120°N 2.12006°W	—	Late 17th century	The farmhouse, which was extended to the left in the 20th century, is in stone and has a roof of tile and stone slate. There are two storeys, the original part has chamfered mullioned windows, and the windows in the later part are casements.	II
Rushton Hall Farmhouse; 53.15013°N 2.10792°W	—	Late 17th century	The farmhouse, which was later altered and extended, is in stone, and has a roof of blue tile and stone slate. There are two storeys, four bays, a lower stable and hay loft recessed to the right, and a single-storey shed recessed to the left. On the front is a gabled porch, and the windows are casements with mullions. Stone steps lead up to the hay loft.	II
Woodhouse Green Farmhouse; 53.16238°N 2.12384°W	—	Late 17th century	The farmhouse is in stone, and has a roof of tiles and stone slate with verge parapets. There is one storey and an attic, and a T-shaped plan, consisting of a hall range and a cross-wing. In the centre is a gabled porch, and the windows are casements.	II
Hammerton House; 53.15834°N 2.09234°W	—	Late 17th or early 18th century	At one time an inn, the house was remodelled in the 19th century. It is in stone and has a stone slate roof. There are two storeys and three bays, the left bay projects slightly, and has a gable with a verge parapet and a fleur-de-lys. In the centre is a Tudor arched doorway, this is flanked by bay windows, above it is a round-headed window, and the outer bays contain casement windows. At the rear is the former brewhouse with a rounded corner.	II
Ryecroft Farmhouse; 53.15151°N 2.09181°W	—	Late 17th or early 18th century	The farmhouse was extended in the 19th century. The early part is timber framed, the later wing at right angles is in brick, and the roof is tiled. There are two storeys and an L-shaped plan. The entrance front is in two parts, the right part with a shingle-hung gable, jettied at the attic level. The windows are casements.	II
The Lee; 53.16348°N 2.11024°W	—	Early 18th century	The farmhouse was extended in 1758, it was remodelled in 1852, and consists of two ranges. The early range is in red brick with rusticated quoins, and has a stone slate roof with verge parapets. The windows in the left part are casements, and to the right is a two-storey bay window with a parapet and a flat roof. The rear range is in stone with a Welsh slate roof, and a hip roofed lean-to. The doorway has a pediment.	II
Headstone; 53.15567°N 2.10005°W	—	Mid 18th century	The headstone is in the churchyard of St Lawrence's Church to the west of the church, and consists of a sandstone slab. It has an inscription, an egg and dart rim, a swan-necked head, and is carved with two angels' heads flanking a death's-head and an hourglass.	II
Hall Memorial; 53.15578°N 2.09943°W	—	1751	The memorial is in the churchyard of St Lawrence's Church to the east of the church, and is to the memory of Margaret Hall. It is a chest tomb in sandstone, and has plain pilasters at the corners, a moulded and inscribed top slab, and circular-ended inscribed panels on the sides.	II
Bunion Memorial; 53.15558°N 2.09958°W	—	1754	The memorial is in the churchyard of St Lawrence's Church to the south of the church, and is to the memory of Samuel Bunion. It is a chest tomb in sandstone, and has a moulded plinth, inset pilasters at the angles with paterae to both faces, banded side panels, and a moulded top slab.	II
Hargreaves Memorial and enclosure 53.15562°N 2.09976°W		c. 1806	The memorial is in the churchyard of St Lawrence's Church to the south of the church. It is a chest tomb in sandstone, and has a moulded plinth, fluted angle pilasters, two oval panels to each side with scrollwork borders, circular panels to the ends, and a moulded edge to the top slab. It is in an enclosure surrounded by wrought iron railings.	II
Primitive Methodist Chapel; 53.15890°N 2.13567°W	—	1815	The chapel, which was extended to the south in the 20th century with the addition of a Sunday school, is in stone and has a tile roof with coped gables and shaped kneelers. There is a single storey and three bays, and the windows have round heads. The Sunday school is lower, and is in brick.	II
Chest tomb 53.15562°N 2.09964°W	—	Early 19th century	The chest tomb is in the churchyard of St Lawrence's Church to the south of the church. It is in stone, and has fluted pilasters at the angles, incised side panels with quadrant corners, and a top slab with reeded edges.	II
Marshside Farmhouse; 53.16028°N 2.09252°W	—	Early 19th century	The farmhouse is in stone with a modillioned eaves band and a hipped slate roof. There are two storeys, an L-shaped plan, and a symmetrical front of three bays. The central doorway has a painted voussoir head and a moulded cornice, and the windows are sashes with painted voussoir heads.	II
New Hall Farmhouse; 53.14970°N 2.10634°W	—	Early 19th century	The farmhouse is in stone, and has a roof of slate and stone slate. There are two storeys, three bays, and a recessed single-storey bay to the right. The windows in the main part are sashes, and in the right bay is a top-hung casement window.	II
Coach house and stable, New Hall Farm; 53.14964°N 2.10594°W	—	Early 19th century	The coach house and stable are in stone, and have a tile roof and verge parapets. They are built into a slope, and have two levels, with a hay loft above. The building contains an elliptical-arched cart entry, with a casement window above and a stable door to the right. The hay loft is entered by three external steps.	II
Sundial; 53.15557°N 2.09998°W	—	Early 19th century	The sundial was re-erected in the churchyard of St Lawrence's Church, possibly incorporating material from an earlier churchyard cross. It is in sandstone, and consists of a plinth, and a shaft about 1.2 metres (3 ft 11 in) high. The top has a coved edge and a metal disc in the centre.	II
Wolfdale Farmhouse, walls, railings and steps 53.14776°N 2.08719°W	—	Early 19th century	The farmhouse is in stone with a slate roof, and has two storeys and two bays. In the centre is a doorway, and the windows are sashes. Flanking the farmhouse are recessed wing walls about 2 metres (6 ft 7 in) high. At the entrance to the garden are cast iron railings on a dwarf wall ramped up to a gate, which is approached by opposing flights of steps.	II
Rushton Spencer Station; 53.15933°N 2.09742°W		1844	The railway station, later a private house, is in Tudor style. It is built in sandstone, and has a tile roof with verge parapets and finials on corbelled kneelers. There is an irregular plan, with a two-storey central block and flanking single-storey wings. In the middle is a two-storey gabled porch containing a Tudor arched doorway over which is a two-light mullioned window in a corbeled block surround with a datestone above. To the right, and recessed, is a narrow gabled bay, and to the left is a projecting single-storey bay with a parapet and containing a casement window.	II
Barn north of Rushton Hall Farmhouse; 53.15030°N 2.10779°W	—	Mid 19th century	The barn, which runs parallel to the north of the farmhouse, is in stone, and has a blue tile roof with verge parapets. There are two levels, with a hayloft over stables and byres. The building contains doorways and windows, some of which are blocked.	II
The Knot Inn; 53.15960°N 2.09592°W		Mid 19th century	A railway inn, it is in red brick, and has a blue tile roof with verge parapets. There are two storeys and a symmetrical front of three bays. The central entrance has a Tudor arch, a moulded surround, and a cornice, above it is an inn sign, and the windows are sashes with stone lintels.	II
Barn northeast of Wall Hill Farmhouse; 53.16670°N 2.10092°W	—	Mid 19th century	The barn is in sandstone, and has a blue tile roof with verge parapets. There is an L-shaped plan, and two levels, consisting of hay lofts above byres and stables. The barn contains windows, doors, hay loft openings, and vents. On a ridge to the left is a three-tier gabled dovecote.	II
Barn north of Wolfdale Farmhouse; 53.14791°N 2.08739°W	—	Mid 19th century	The barn is in stone and has a blue tile roof with verge parapets. There is an L-shaped plan, and two levels, consisting of hay lofts above byres. The barn contains windows, doors, and blocked vents.	II
Barn south of Wolfdale Farmhouse; 53.14761°N 2.08710°W	—	Mid 19th century	The barn is in stone and has a blue tile roof with verge parapets, and is about 25 metres (82 ft) long. There are two levels, consisting of a hay loft above a byre and sheds. The front is blind, and at the rear are doors with hay loft openings above, and casement windows.	II

== See also ==
- Listed buildings in Bosley, Cheshire
- Listed buildings in Heaton
- Listed buildings in Horton
- Listed buildings in Biddulph
- Listed buildings in Congleton, Cheshire
