= Langley Hall, Cheshire =

Country house in Cheshire, England

Coordinates: 53.24143°N 2.09381°W

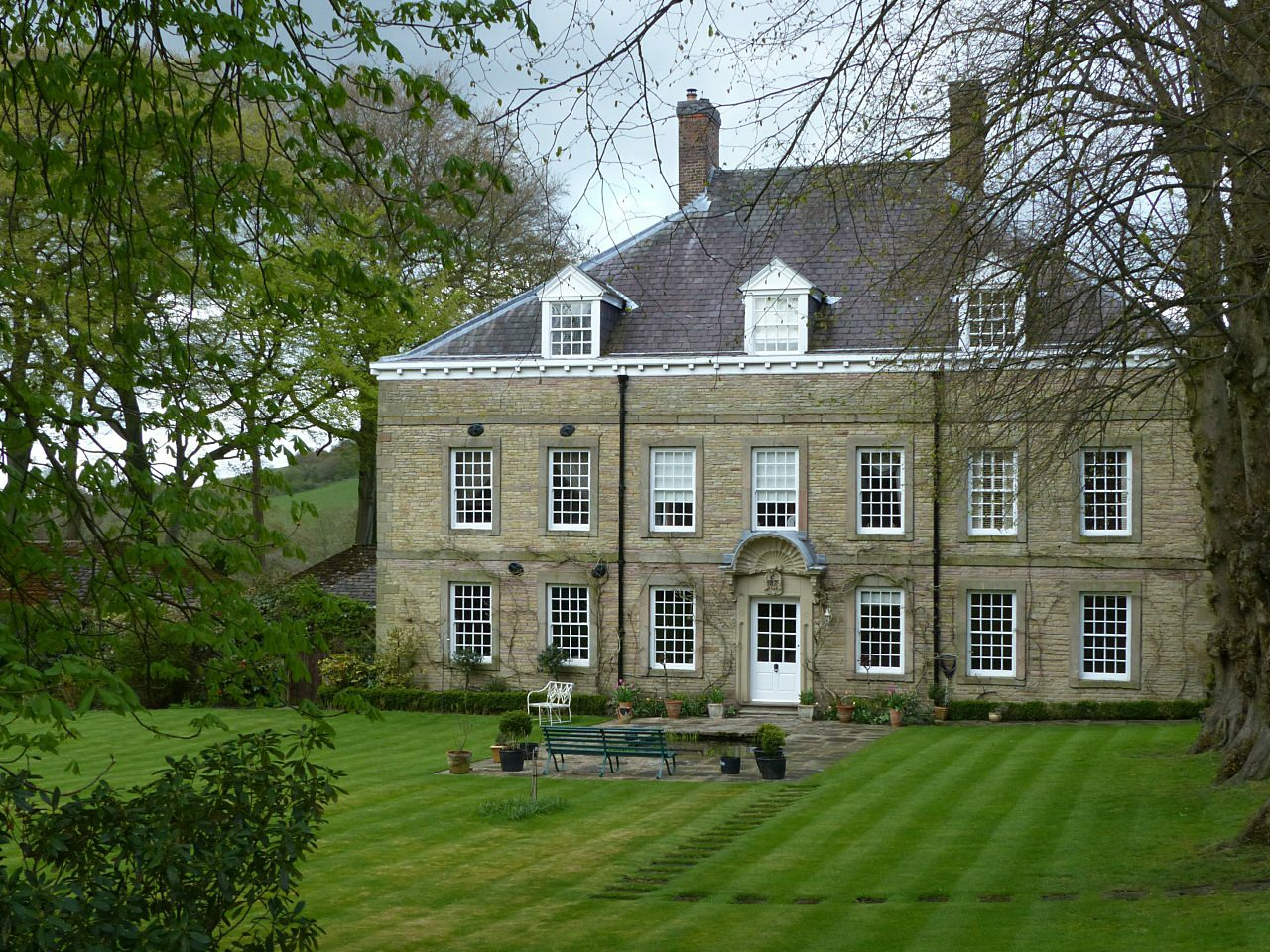
Langley Hall

Langley Hall is a country house in the village of Langley, Cheshire, England. It was built in about 1650, and is described by the authors of the Buildings of England series as "a distinguished house". The house is constructed in coursed rubble with ashlar dressings and is roofed in stone slate. It has two-storeys and an attic. The entrance front is symmetrical with seven bays and a central doorway. Above the doorway is a cartouche containing a carved face. It is inscribed MAC 1696 (for M. Clowes and his wife). The house is recorded in the National Heritage List for England as a designated Grade II* listed building. It has been converted into three flats.

== See also ==
- Grade II* listed buildings in Cheshire East.
- Listed buildings in Sutton, Cheshire East.
