= Sutton Hall, Sutton Lane Ends =

Sutton Hall
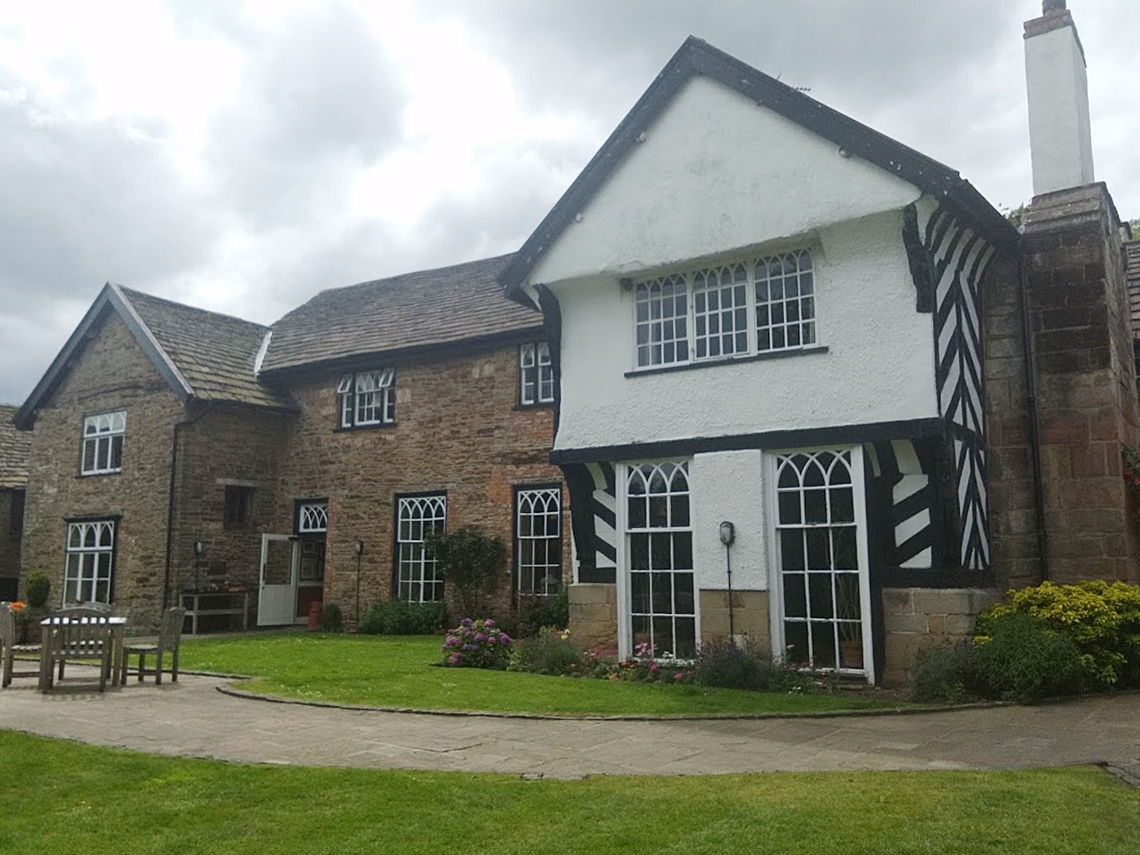

- Location within Cheshire

General information
- Location: Sutton Lane Ends, Cheshire East, United Kingdom
- Coordinates: 53.24067°N 2.11271°W

Website
- www.brunningandprice.co.uk/suttonhall/

Listed Building – Grade II
- Official name: Sutton Hall
- Designated: 25 July 1952
- Reference no.: 1139474

Sutton Hall is a former country house to the west of the village of Sutton Lane Ends, Cheshire, England.

The present building dates from the middle of the 17th century, with additions and alterations in the late 18th century, and replaced a previous manor house. It has since been converted into a pub/restaurant.

== Description ==
The house is constructed partly in stone, and partly in timber framing, with a U-shaped plan. The arms of the "U" end in irregular gables. The left gable is in stone, and the right is timber-framed. The upper storey of the right gable is jettied, the jetty being supported on brackets carved with wooden figures, one a knight in chain mail. Between the two wings is the former great hall. A 16th century chapel at the rear of the house, which has served at different times as stables and as a convent, now serves as the restaurant kitchens. The house is recorded in the National Heritage List for England as a designated Grade II listed building.

Not far from the hall is a Bronze Age barrow or cairn, probably a cremation site, now much reduced in size.

== History ==
Once the property of the Sir Humphrey Davenport, Chief Baron of the Exchequer in 1631, the Manor of Sutton later passed by marriage to Sir Rowland Belasyse, an ancestor of the Earls of Fauconberg. In 1819 it was acquired by the Countess of Lucan and descended to her successors, the Lords Lucan, primarily used as a farmhouse. The countess had been born Elizabeth Belasyse, daughter of Henry Belasyse, 2nd Earl Fauconberg and in 1794 had married Richard Bingham, who became the 2nd Earl of Lucan in 1799. By 1804, after six children, they had separated.

In the 1880s and 1890s, the property was rented by the explorers Theodore Bent and his wife Mabel Bent.

In 2008 the building was substantially refurbished as a restaurant by Brunning and Price, the then owners.

== See also ==
- Listed buildings in Sutton, Cheshire East
