= Rushton, Staffordshire =

Civil parish in Staffordshire, England

Coordinates: 53.1600°N 2.0934°W

Rushton
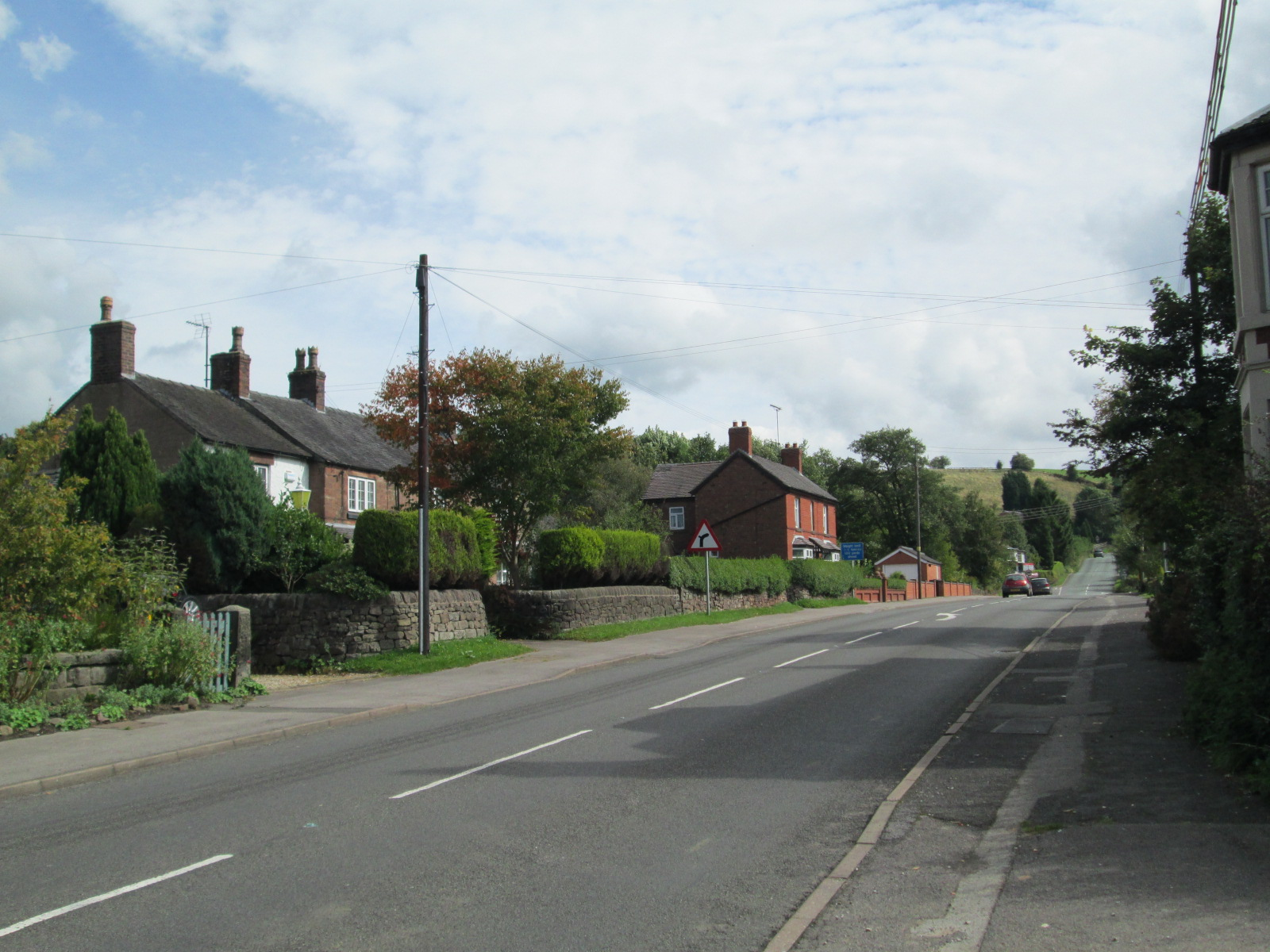
- Rushton Spencer on the A523

- Location within Staffordshire
- Population: 485 (2011)
- OS grid reference: SJ938625
- Civil parish: Rushton
- District: Staffordshire Moorlands
- Shire county: Staffordshire
- Region: West Midlands
- Country: England
- Sovereign state: United Kingdom
- Post town: MACCLESFIELD
- Postcode district: SK11
- Dialling code: 01260
- Police: Staffordshire
- Fire: Staffordshire
- Ambulance: West Midlands
- UK Parliament: Staffordshire Moorlands

Rushton is a civil parish in the Staffordshire Moorlands district, in the county of Staffordshire, England. The parish includes the village of Rushton Spencer, which is about 4 miles (6.4 km) north of Leek and 7 miles (11 km) south of Macclesfield, on the A523 road which runs between these towns.

The parish council does not yet have its own website; however, the Rushton Manor Courts Leet and Baron does record the proceedings of the Parish Council, which include minutes and agendas.

At one time there were two adjacent civil parishes, Rushton Spencer and Rushton James. Rushton Spencer has the River Dane at its northern boundary with Cheshire, and the road crosses the river at Hugbridge; Bosley Cloud is the western boundary. To the south, separated by a stream, is Rushton James, which is bordered by Long Edge in the west, and Ryecroft Gate in the east. The parishes were amalgamated in 1934 to form Rushton civil parish.

There are two public houses in the village. The Knot Inn is on Station Lane, west of the main road; it is near the former railway station and used to be called the Railway Inn. The Royal Oak is on the main road at the junction with Leek Old Road.

A short distance south-east of the village, on Leek Old Road, is St Helen's Well. There is an old belief that when the well becomes dry, there will be bad times.

== History ==
=== Medieval ===
The name Rushton, from Old English, means a settlement by rushes.

The area was a single manor at the time of the Norman Conquest. The overlordship was held by the Earls of Chester probably by the late 11th century. Ranulf de Gernon, 4th Earl of Chester from 1129 to 1153, gave Rushton to Norman de Verdun of Alton.

Two manors existed by the early 13th century; the northern part, originally called Hugbridge, was held by Sir Hugh le Despenser (hence the name Rushton Spencer), who paid chief rent to Ranulf de Blondeville, 6th Earl of Chester; by 1251 the rent was paid to Dieulacres Abbey, near Leek, established earlier by Ranulf de Blondeville.

The southern part continued to have the Verduns as overlord; its name, Rushton James, was probably acquired from the tenant there, James de Audley. The manor house probably stood on the site of Rushton Hall Farm, which lies near the road between Congleton and Ryecroft Gate. This road, passing through Rushton James, was part of the medieval route known as the Earlsway, which linked this and other estates of the Earls of Chester. The Earlsway also passed through Leek, where the Earls of Chester were lords of the manor.

=== Railway ===
The North Staffordshire Railway company's railway line between Leek and Macclesfield opened in 1849; it ran near the village, where there was Rushton railway station. It was closed for passengers in 1960 and for freight soon afterwards.

== Churches ==
=== Church of St Lawrence ===
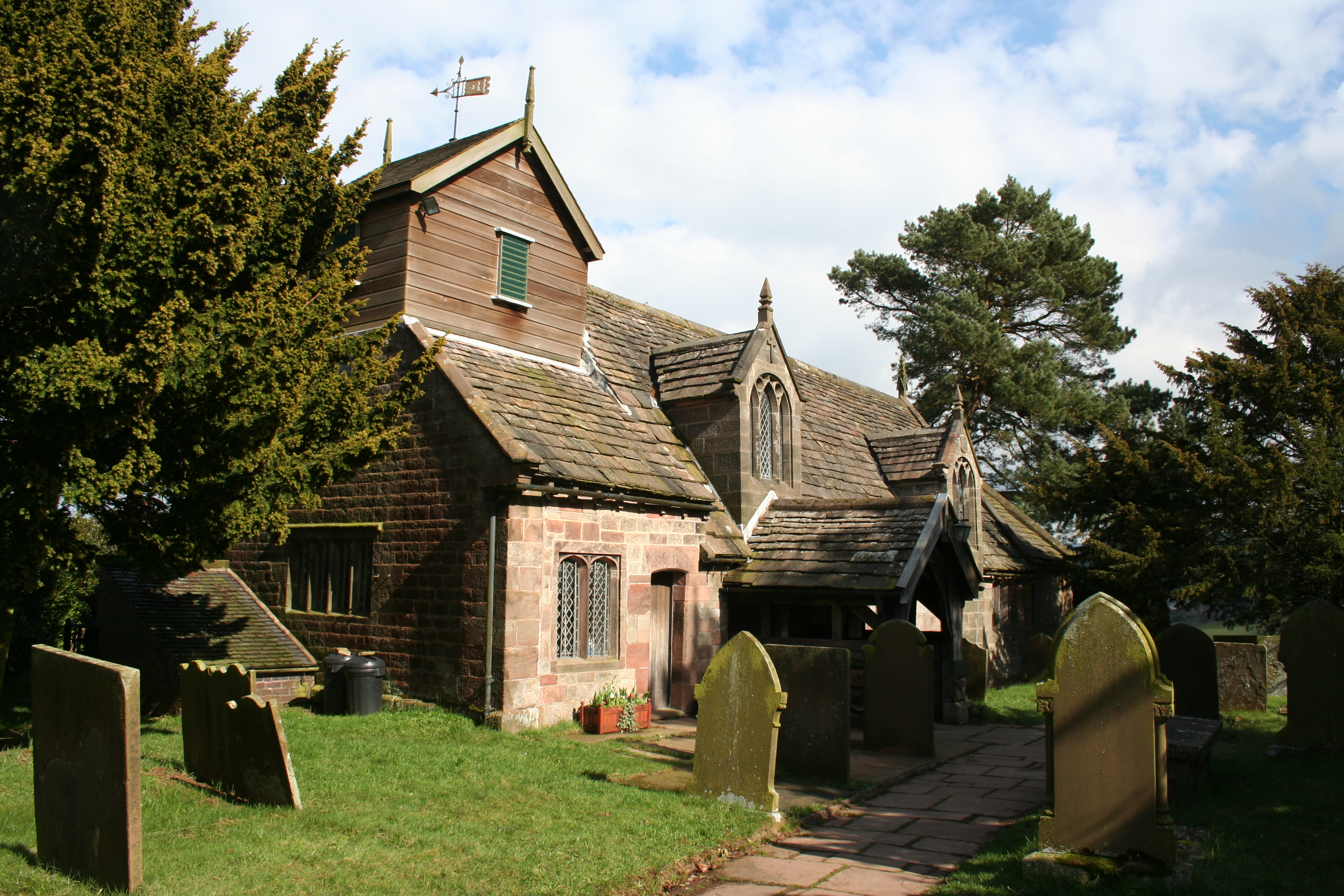
St Lawrence's Church, Rushton Spencer

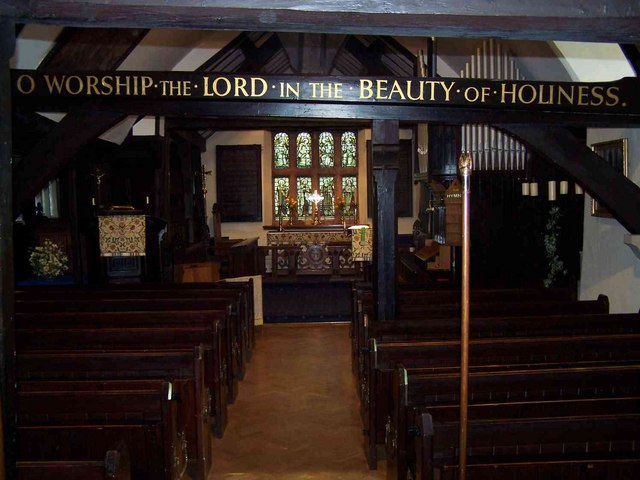
Interior of the church

The Anglican church of St Lawrence is on high ground south-west of the village, grid reference SJ934621. Because of this remote situation, it has been called "the chapel in the wilderness".

It is known there was a church in Rushton Spencer in 1368: in that year, the bishop licensed the inhabitants to hold services. Until the mid 19th century the Rushton chapelry, including Rushton James, Rushton Spencer and Heaton, was dependent on Leek parish church. The chapelry became a parish in 1865.

The existing building, which is Grade II* listed, has medieval timber-framing and was rebuilt in sandstone in the 17th century. It has a nave of three bays; the chancel is not separated from the nave. There is a north aisle and a vestry in the west which has a timber bell turret above. There is a large stone font, probably of the 13th century, at the west end of the nave.

In 1830 and 1841 the Archdeacon of Stafford recommended the demolition of the church, its replacement to be built at Rushton Marsh. Instead, the building was repaired in the 1840s; this included dormer windows placed in the south roof. The altar is of carved oak and was installed in 1923.

Work to close up a door behind the altar in 1956 revealed a flight of steps leading down to the forgotten Trafford family vault; at least one of the coffins had been plundered for its lead and silver.

St Lawrence is one of the churches in the United Benefice of Cheddleton, Horton, Longsdon and Rushton Spencer, of the Diocese of Lichfield.

=== Methodist church ===
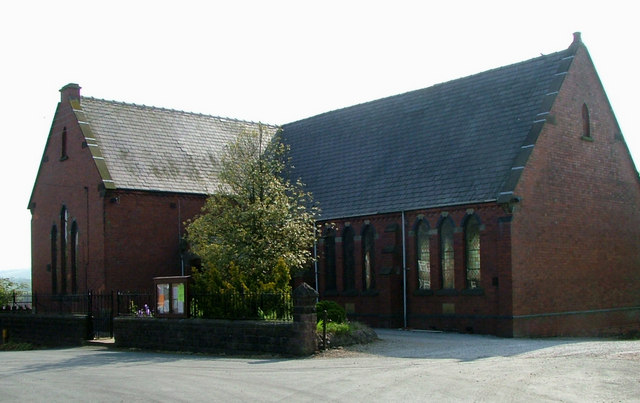
Rushton Spencer Methodist Church

Methodist services were held in Rushton by 1798, and a Methodist chapel was built, in Alley Lane in Heaton near the boundary with Rushton, in 1816. It was replaced in 1899 by the present brick-built church in Rushton Spencer, on Sugar Street, east of the main road.

== See also ==
- Listed buildings in Rushton, Staffordshire
