= St Michael's Church, North Rode =

Coordinates: 53.1958°N 2.1671°W

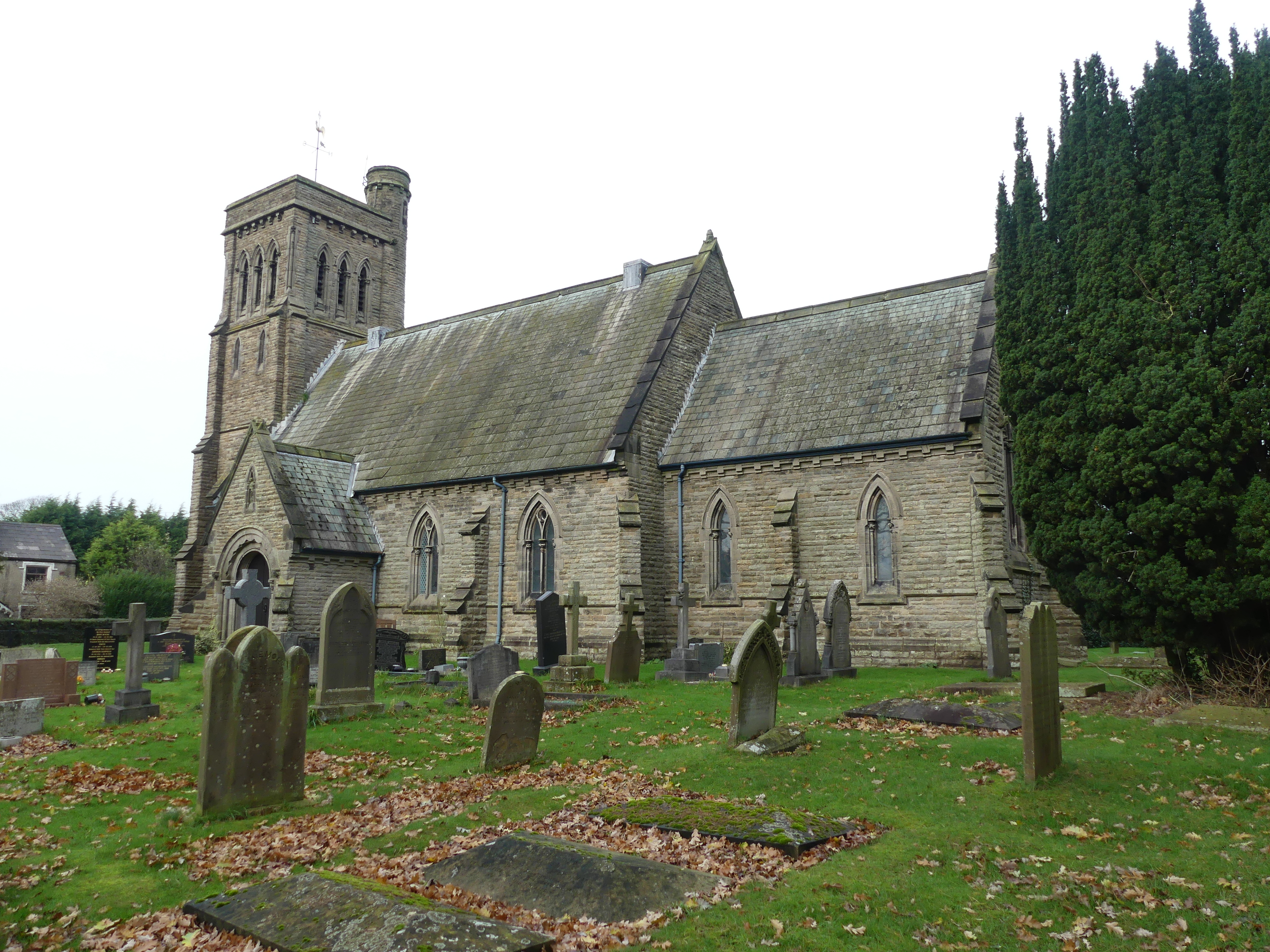
- North Rode Church

- Location in Cheshire
- OS grid reference: SJ 889 665
- Location: Church Lane, North Rode, Cheshire
- Country: England
- Denomination: Anglican
- Website: St Michael, North Rode

History
- Status: Parish church
- Dedication: Saint Michael

Architecture
- Functional status: Active
- Heritage designation: Grade II
- Designated: 25 October 1985
- Architect(s): Charles and James Trubshaw
- Architectural type: Church
- Style: Romanesque Revival; Gothic Revival
- Groundbreaking: 1845
- Completed: 1846

Specifications
- Materials: Stone, tiled roof

Administration
- Province: York
- Diocese: Chester
- Archdeaconry: Macclesfield
- Deanery: Macclesfield
- Parish: North Rode

Clergy
- Vicar: Revd Colin Wilson

St Michael's Church is in Church Lane, North Rode, Cheshire, England. It is an active Anglican parish church in the deanery of Macclesfield, the archdeaconry of Macclesfield, and the diocese of Chester. Its benefice is combined with those of St Mary the Virgin, Bosley, St Saviour, Wildboarclough, and St Michael, Wincle. The church is recorded in the National Heritage List for England as a designated Grade II listed building. The authors of the Buildings of England series describe it as "a charming estate church".

== History ==
St Michael's was built in 1845–46, and designed by Charles and James Trubshaw.

As of 2026 ST Michael's church was art risk of closure due to the low number of volunteers needed to run the church.

== Architecture ==
=== Exterior ===
The church is constructed in rubble stone with ashlar dressings, and has a tiled roof. Its plan consists of a four-bay nave, a south porch, a two-bay chancel with a vestry to the northeast, and a west tower. The tower has angle buttresses and a plain parapet. In the angle between the tower and the nave on the north side is a stair turret which rises above the height of the tower, and contains round-headed casement windows. On the west side of the tower is a doorway with a semicircular head in a loosely Romanesque style, which is decorated with spaced chevron motifs. Above the door is a two-light window in loosely Early English style, with a circular clock face above that. On each side of the top stage are three lancet bell openings. The south porch has a loosely Romanesque doorway, above which is a niche containing a statue of Saint Michael. The windows along the sides of the church are in Early English style.

=== Interior ===
Inside the church, the nave has a hammerbeam roof. Both the nave and the chancel are floored with encaustic tiles. In the church are four brass corona chandeliers. The font is decorated with encaustic tiles. In the church are memorials to the Daintry and Tootal Broadhurst families. The stained glass is described as being "delightfully bad".

== See also ==
- Listed buildings in North Rode
