= Oakgrove, Cheshire =

Village in Cheshire, England

Coordinates: 53.21°N 02.13°W

Oakgrove
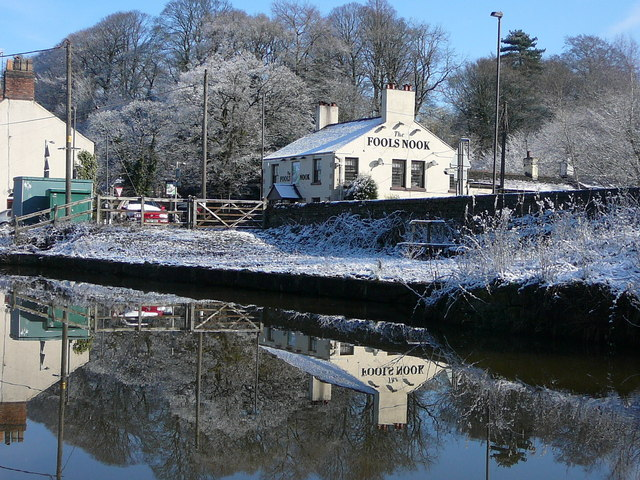
- Fools Nook public house on the Macclesfield Canal

- Location within Cheshire
- OS grid reference: SJ9169
- Unitary authority: Cheshire East
- Ceremonial county: Cheshire
- Region: North West
- Country: England
- Sovereign state: United Kingdom
- Police: Cheshire
- Fire: Cheshire
- Ambulance: North West

Oakgrove is a village in Cheshire, England. It is part of the civil parish of Sutton and is situated on the Macclesfield Canal which is crossed here by a swing bridge and on the A523 road, just north of the boundary with Gawsworth civil parish.

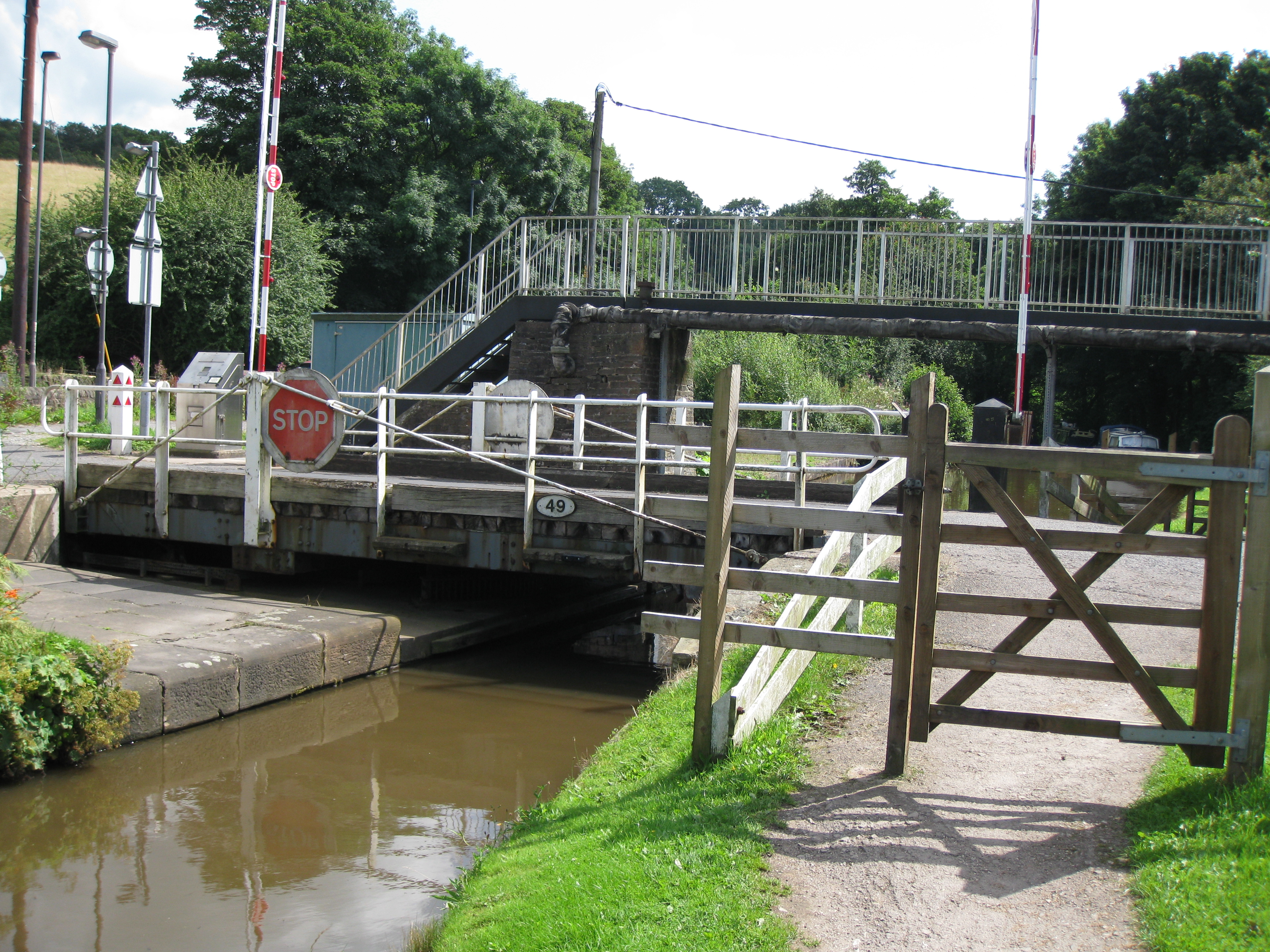
Swing bridge at Oakgrove
