= Heaton, Staffordshire =

Village in Staffordshire, England

Coordinates: 53.1608°N 2.0755°W

Heaton
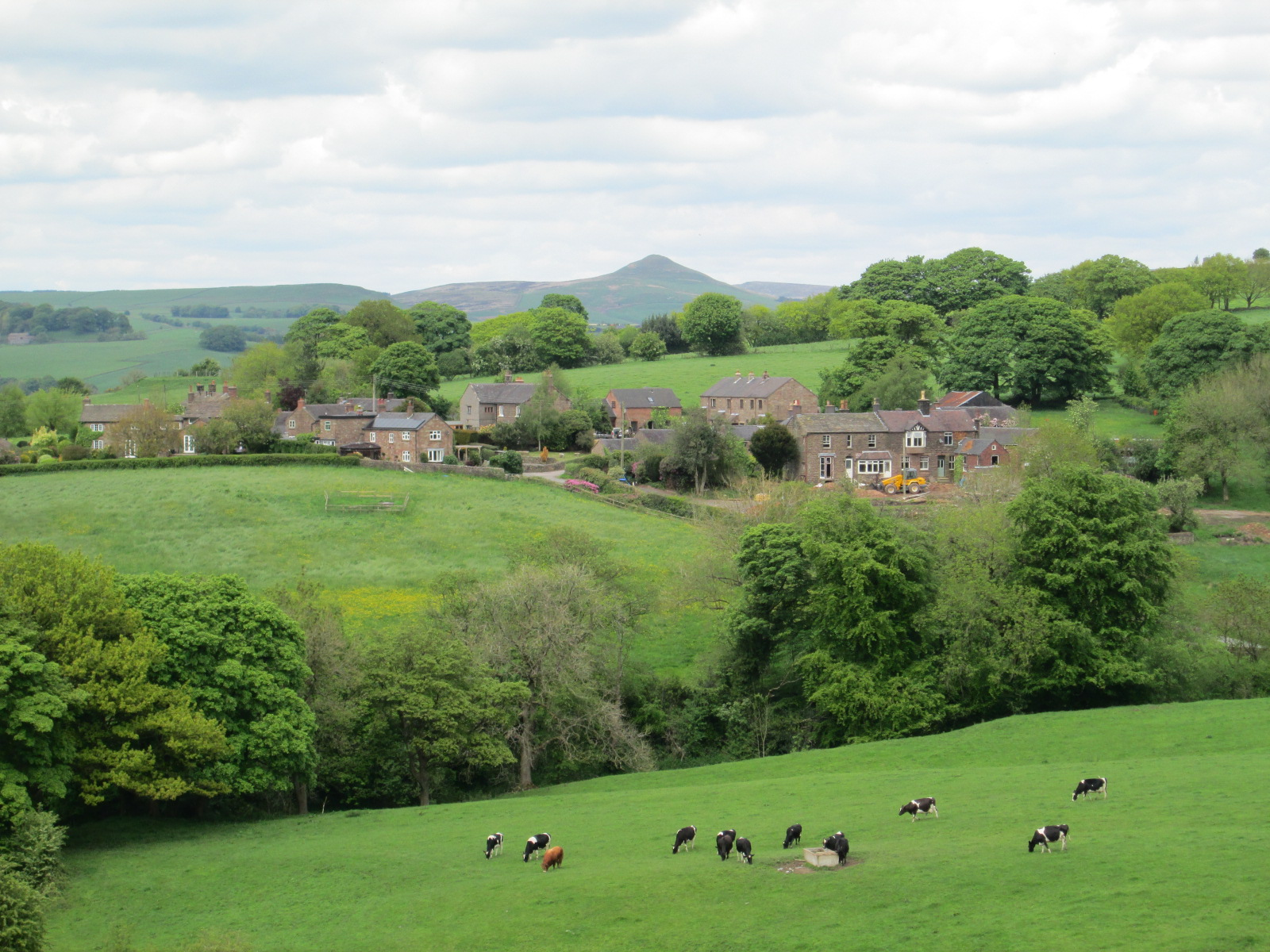
- The village of Heaton, seen from the south. The peak in the distance is Shutlingsloe.

- Location within Staffordshire
- Population: 262 (2011)
- OS grid reference: SJ950626
- District: Staffordshire Moorlands
- Shire county: Staffordshire
- Region: West Midlands
- Country: England
- Sovereign state: United Kingdom
- Post town: Macclesfield
- Postcode district: SK11
- Police: Staffordshire
- Fire: Staffordshire
- Ambulance: West Midlands
- UK Parliament: Staffordshire Moorlands

Heaton is a small village and civil parish in Staffordshire, England. It is about 4 miles (6.4 km) north of Leek and about 7 miles (11 km) south of Macclesfield.

The village of Heaton is situated near the centre of the civil parish. The River Dane is the northern boundary with Cheshire; the civil parishes of Rushton and Leekfrith are to the west and east. A hill named Gun is at the eastern boundary, and in the north-east is Swythamley Hall.

The ground is of boulder clay, and the underlying rock is millstone grit. The soil is loam and clay. The land is used mostly as pasture.

== History ==
=== Medieval ===
The Old English name Heaton means a high settlement.

Ranulf de Blondeville, 6th Earl of Chester, who had established Dieulacres Abbey near Leek, granted Leek manor to the abbey in 1232 and this probably included Heaton. By 1291 there were monastic granges in Heaton at Fairboroughs and Swythamley; the abbey also owned other land in Heaton. After the dissolution of the monasteries in the early 16th century, these estates were sold.

A medieval route between Leek and Macclesfield passed through the eastern side of the Heaton area over Gun and crossed the River Dane at Danebridge. The bridge here was known in medieval times as Scliderford (slippery ford).

=== Enclosures ===
Heaton Inclosure Act 1816
- Act of Parliament
- Parliament of the United Kingdom
- Long title: An Act for inclosing Lands in the Manor and Township of Heaton, in the Parish of Leek, in the County of Stafford.
- Citation: 56 Geo. 3. c. 6 Pr.

Dates
- Royal assent: 11 April 1816

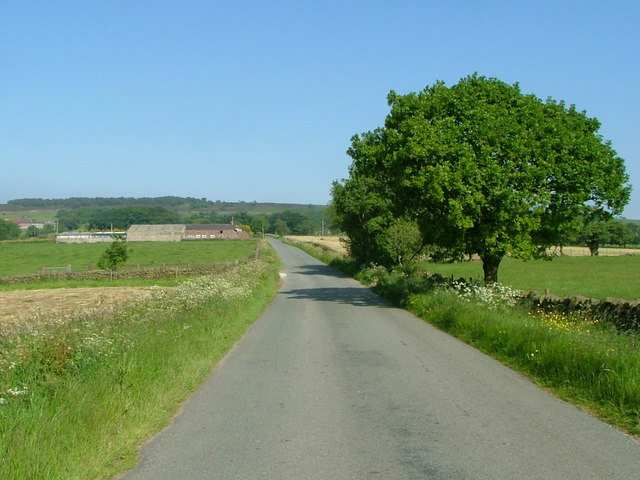
Countryside south-east of the village of Heaton, looking towards Gun

South and east of the village was formerly common land. It was enclosed by inclosure acts in the 17th century, and later in the 1820s when a new road was laid out which bypassed the village.

=== Chapelry ===
There is no church; since at least the 18th century the area has been served by St Lawrence's Church, Rushton Spencer. Until 1865 Heaton was part of the Rushton chapelry, dependent on Leek parish church; in that year the chapelry became a parish.

== See also ==
- Listed buildings in Heaton, Staffordshire
