= St Michael's Church, Wincle =

Coordinates: 53.1917°N 2.0634°W

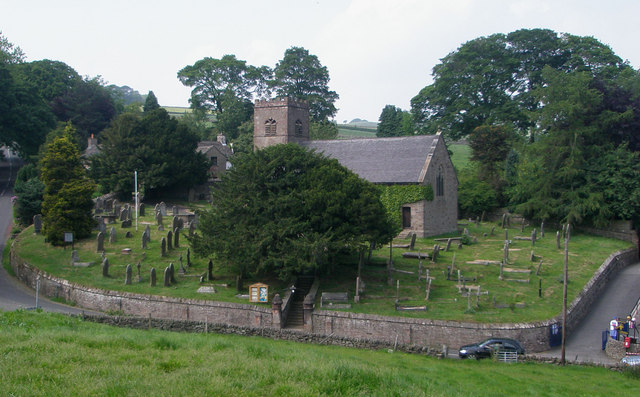
- St Michael's Church, Wincle, from the south

- Location in Cheshire
- OS grid reference: SJ 959 662
- Location: Wincle, Cheshire
- Country: England
- Denomination: Anglican
- Website: St Michael's Wincle

History
- Status: Parish church
- Dedication: St Michael

Architecture
- Functional status: Active
- Heritage designation: Grade II
- Designated: 14 June 1984
- Architect: Edward Witts
- Architectural type: Church
- Style: Gothic Revival
- Completed: 1882

Specifications
- Materials: Buff rubble gritstone Roof grey tiles

Administration
- Province: York
- Diocese: Chester
- Archdeaconry: Macclesfield
- Deanery: Macclesfield
- Parish: Wincle, St Michael

Clergy
- Vicar: Rev Verena Breed

St Michael's Church is in the village of Wincle, Cheshire, England. It is an active Anglican parish church in the diocese of Chester, the archdeaconry of Macclesfield and the deanery of Macclesfield. Its benefice is combined with those of St Mary, Bosley, St Michael, North Rode, and St Saviour, Wildboarclough. The church is recorded in the National Heritage List for England as a designated Grade II listed building.

== History ==
The original church was built in 1647 on the site of a Neolithic burial mound. A tower was added about 1815, and the rest of the church was rebuilt in 1882 by Edward Witts.

== Architecture ==
The church is built in buff coursed rubble gritstone with a roof of banded grey tiles. The tower is at the west end and the body of the church has five bays. There are no aisles. The tower is in three stages, with a plain west window and bell openings with louvres of Kerridge stone. The top of the tower is battlemented. Over the priest's door is a lintel from the older church which is dated 1647. In the church is a font dated 1861. The interior of the church is "unadorned".

== External features ==
In the southwest corner of the churchyard is the war grave of a South Wales Borderers soldier of World War I.

== See also ==
- Listed buildings in Wincle
