= St Saviour's Church, Wildboarclough =

Coordinates: 53.2161°N 2.0246°W

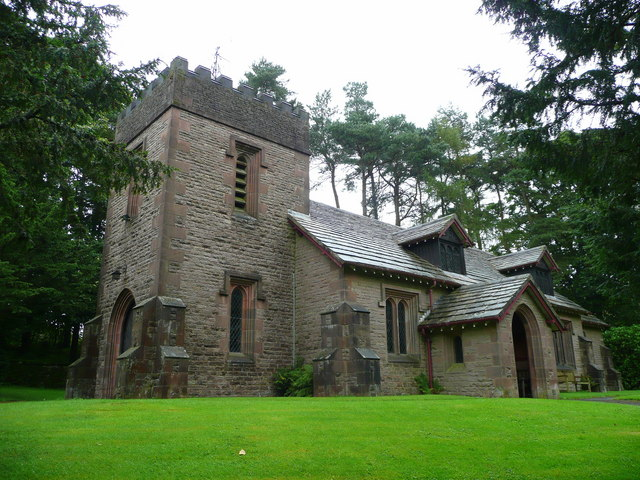
- St Saviour's Church, Wildboarclough, from the southwest

- Location in Cheshire
- OS grid reference: SJ 985 688
- Location: Wildboarclough, Cheshire
- Country: England
- Denomination: Anglican
- Website: St Saviour, Wildboarclough

History
- Status: Parish church
- Founded: 14 September 1901
- Founder: 16th Earl of Derby
- Consecrated: 1909

Architecture
- Functional status: Active
- Heritage designation: Grade II
- Designated: 7 November 1983
- Architectural type: Church
- Style: Gothic Revival
- Completed: 1909

Specifications
- Materials: Sandstone; Kerridge stone-slate roofs

Administration
- Province: York
- Diocese: Chester
- Archdeaconry: Macclesfield
- Deanery: Macclesfield
- Parish: St Saviour, Wildboarclough

Clergy
- Vicar: Revd Verena Breed

St Saviour's Church is in the village of Wildboarclough, Cheshire, England. It is an active Anglican parish church in the deanery of Macclesfield, the archdeaconry of Macclesfield, and the diocese of Chester. Its benefice is combined with those of St Mary the Virgin, Bosley, St Michael, North Rode, and St Michael, Wincle. The church is recorded in the National Heritage List for England as a designated Grade II listed building.

== History ==
The church was built between 1901 and 1909 for the 16th Earl of Derby to celebrate the safe return of his sons from the Boer War. The building was carried out by workers from the Crag estate. The foundation stone was laid by the Countess of Derby on 14 September 1901, and the church was consecrated in 1909.

== Architecture ==
St Saviour's is constructed in red sandstone rubble with ashlar dressings and Kerridge stone-slate roofs. Its plan consists of a four-bay nave with a south porch, a single-bay chancel with a north vestry, and a west tower. The tower is in two stages, and is battlemented. The east window consists of three lancets. Elsewhere there are square-headed mullioned windows. In the south-facing roof are two three-light gabled dormers. Inside the church is an oak dado, above which the walls are plastered. The fixtures and fittings in the church include an ornate early 20th century stone font, with stiff-leaf capitals, and a wooden font cover with the Lamb of God as a finial. The authors of the Buildings of England series comment that the church is "surprisingly dismal inside".

== See also ==
- Listed buildings in Macclesfield Forest and Wildboarclough
