= Church of St Mary the Virgin, Bosley =

Coordinates: 53.1870°N 2.1239°W

Church of St. Mary the Virgin, Bosley
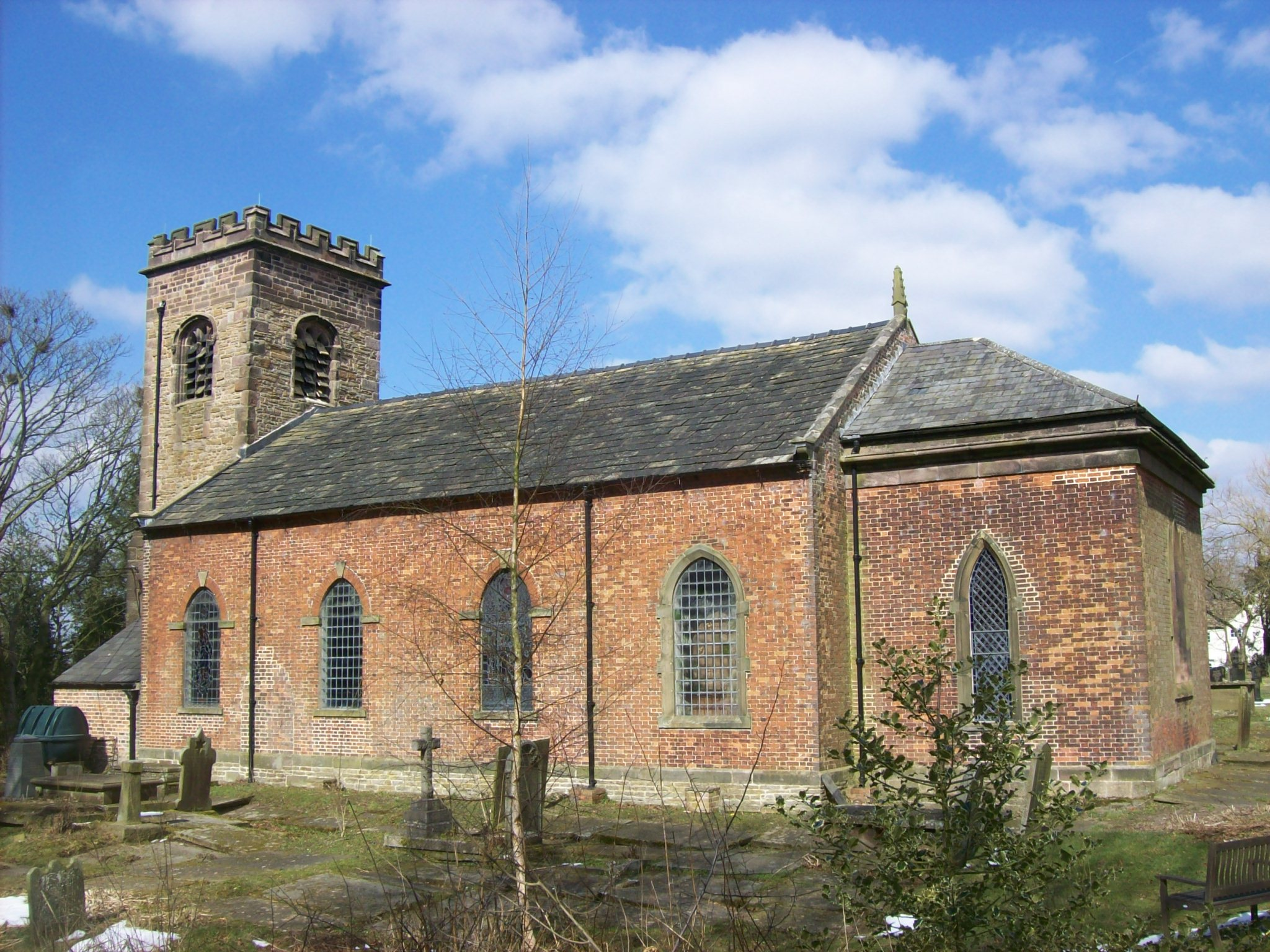
- Church of St Mary the Virgin, Bosley

- Location in Cheshire
- OS grid reference: SJ 918 655
- Location: Bosley, Cheshire
- Country: England
- Denomination: Anglican
- Website: St Mary, Bosley

History
- Status: Parish church
- Dedication: Virgin Mary

Architecture
- Functional status: Active
- Heritage designation: Grade II*
- Designated: 14 April 1967
- Architect: James Green
- Architectural type: Church
- Completed: 1879

Specifications
- Materials: Red sandstone tower Brick nave and chancel Slate roofs

Administration
- Province: York
- Diocese: Chester
- Archdeaconry: Macclesfield
- Deanery: Macclesfield
- Parish: St Mary, Bosley

Clergy
- Vicar: Revd Verena Breed

The Church of St Mary the Virgin is in Leek Road, Bosley, Cheshire, England. It is recorded in the National Heritage List for England as a designated Grade II* listed building. It is an active Anglican parish church in the diocese of Chester, the archdeaconry of Macclesfield, and the deanery of Macclesfield. Its benefice is combined with those of St Michael, North Rode, St Michael, Wincle, and St Saviour, Wildboarclough.

== History ==
This church was initially a chapel of ease to the parish church of Prestbury and was dedicated to Saint Thomas the Martyr. Later the dedication was changed to Saint Lawrence, and later again to Saint Mary the Virgin. In response to a petition by the parishioners a papal bull was issued by Pope Boniface IX in 1402 granting the church greater independence.

The church was originally a timber-framed church with a stone tower. The red sandstone tower dates from about 1500. In 1777 the church, apart from the tower, was rebuilt in brick. A chancel designed by James Green was added in 1834. In 1878–79 new bells were installed, the tower was raised by 6 feet (2 m), and some of the original medieval stonework was removed.

== Architecture ==
=== Exterior ===
The tower is built of red sandstone, the nave and chancel of brick, with roofs of large grey slates. The tower has three stages with a 19th-century west door in a medieval arch, above which is a window with two lights. The top of the tower is battlemented. The plan of the body of the church consists of a four-bay nave and a one-bay chancel, and a lean-to vestry to the north of the tower. The tower is in Perpendicular style. The nave windows are wide and slightly pointed; those in the chancel are lancets.

=== Interior ===
In the church is a late 18th-century altar table, a 17th-century oak pulpit, sanctuary chairs from the same period, and a parish chest dating probably from the 16th century. The organ is dated 1879 and the stone font is also from the 19th century. In the church is a monument to John Willans Newell, a railway engineer, who died in 1851. This includes a female figure, a sarcophagus, an urn, and an amphora containing flowers. The stained glass in the east window and in two of the side windows dates from the 1960s, and is by Harcourt M. Doyle. There is a ring of six bells, the oldest bell by George Oldfield I being dated 1663. Two bells dated 1756 are by Rudhall of Gloucester and another two bells, dated 1927 and 1934 are by Gillett & Johnston. The maker of the sixth bell has not been identified. The parish registers begin in 1728.

== External features ==
In the church yard is a sundial (with the gnomon missing) dating probably from the early 19th century. It consists of a copper dial on a short tapered square gritstone shaft with a square head standing on a weathered red sandstone base. Churchwardens' initials are engraved on the dial. It is listed at Grade II. The churchyard contains the war grave of a First World War Canadian soldier.

== See also ==
- Grade II* listed buildings in Cheshire East
- Listed buildings in Bosley
