= Wincle =

Coordinates: 53.19°N 2.06°W

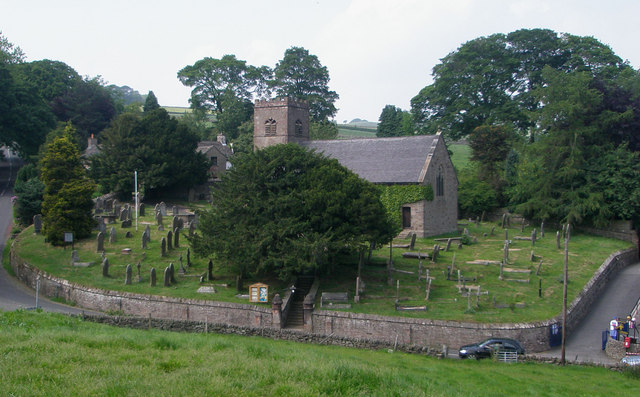
- St Michael's Church. Wincle

- Location within Cheshire
- Population: 147 ()
- OS grid reference: SJ9566
- Civil parish: Wincle
- Unitary authority: Cheshire East
- Ceremonial county: Cheshire
- Region: North West
- Country: England
- Sovereign state: United Kingdom
- Post town: MACCLESFIELD
- Postcode district: SK11
- Dialling code: 01260
- Police: Cheshire
- Fire: Cheshire
- Ambulance: North West
- UK Parliament: Macclesfield

Wincle is a village and civil parish in the Cheshire East district of Cheshire, England. It holds parish meetings, rather than parish council meetings.

Wincle has a pub, brewery and school. There are several listed buildings and scheduled monuments, including St Michael's Church.

Across the River Dane, which is the border between Cheshire and Staffordshire, sits the neighbouring village of Danebridge.

== See also ==
- Listed buildings in Wincle
- Scheduled monuments in and around Wincle
