= Gurnett =

Gurnett is a surname. Notable people with the surname include:

- Donald Gurnett {1940-2022), American physicist
- George Gurnett (c. 1792–1861), Canadian journalist and politician
- Jane Gurnett (born 1957), English actress
- Jim Gurnett (born 1949), Canadian politician
- John W. Gurnett (1865–1920), American businessman and politician
- Terry Gurnett (born 1955), American soccer coach
