= Listed buildings in Sutton, Cheshire East =

Sutton, also known as Sutton Lane Ends, is a civil parish in Cheshire East, England. It contains 44 buildings that are recorded in the National Heritage List for England as designated listed buildings. Of these, two are listed at Grade II*, the middle of the three grades, and the others are at Grade II. The parish is mainly rural, consisting of farmland and moorland. Many of the listed buildings are farmhouses and farm buildings, or houses with associated structures. Around the parish is a series of parish boundary stones. Passing through the west of the parish is the Macclesfield Canal, and there are listed buildings associated with this, including bridges, an aqueduct, and a milestone. Other listed buildings include a medieval wayside cross, a chapel and chaplain's house, a public house, and a mileplate.

== Key ==
Grade	Criteria
II*	Particularly important buildings of more than special interest
II	Buildings of national importance and special interest

== Buildings ==
Name and location	Photograph	Date	Notes	Grade
Wayside cross 53.22006°N 2.06721°W		Medieval	The wayside standing cross is a monolithic rectangular block of red sandstone about 6 feet 6 inches (2.0 m) high. On each side is cross in relief, and on one side is an Ordnance Survey bench mark. The date 1887 has also been carved into the stone. The cross is also a scheduled monument.	II
Chapel and chaplain's house 53.24064°N 2.11301°W	—	16th century	The chapel served the occupants of Sutton Hall, and was endowed in 1524. The chapel and chaplain's house are in stone with stone-slate roofs, and are in one and two storeys. The chapel continued in use as a Roman Catholic chapel until 1716, when it became Anglican. It closed as a chapel in 1760, but returned to use as a Roman Catholic chapel in the 1950s.	II*
Sutton Hall Farm; 53.24046°N 2.11250°W	—	Late 16th century	A farmhouse that has been altered in each of the succeeding four centuries. It is built partly in stone and partly in brick, some of which has been rendered and pebbledashed. The roof is partly tiled and partly slated. The farmhouse is in two storeys. All the windows date from the 20th century. Inside is a pair of cruck blades.	II
Ridge Hall Farmhouse; 53.23128°N 2.09106°W	—	1580	The farmhouse was altered in the 17th and again in the 19th century. The farmhouse is in two storeys, and is built in stone with a stone-slate roof. In the original portion some of the doors and the windows, which were mullioned, are blocked. On the front is a gabled porch, and the windows are casements. The farmhouse stands on a moated site, which is a scheduled monument.	II
Langley Hall; 53.24143°N 2.09381°W	—	c.1650	A small country house in stone with a stone-slate roof. A hood was added over the doorway in 1696, and the original roof was replaced by a hipped roof in about 1870. The house is in two storeys with an attic, and has a front of seven bays. The central doorway is flanked by decorative panels, and over it is a semicircular hood carried on consoles. Over this is a cartouche containing a datestone. The windows are sashes, those in the attic are in three gabled dormers. The house has been converted into three dwellings.	II*
Sutton Hall; 53.24064°N 2.11268°W		17th century	A country house that was extended in the 18th century, and has since been converted into a public house. It is partly timber-framed with rendered infill and partly in stone, and has a stone-slate roof. It consists of a two-storey hall with cross-wings, and some of the timber framing is close studded. The garden front has a projecting wing with a jettied first floor that is supported by carved figures.	II
Outbuildings, Ridge Hall Farm; 53.23153°N 2.09141°W		17th century	A range of farm buildings, some of which date from the 18th century. They are in stone, or in brick with stone dressings, and have stone-slate roofs. The buildings are in three and two storeys, and contain a variety of openings, including square pitch holes.	II
Great Oak Cottage and Farm; 53.22535°N 2.12123°W		Mid-17th century	The farmhouse was altered in the 18th and 19th centuries. The original part is timber-framed with rendered infill, and the later parts are in brick and stone. The building is in two storeys, and has a stone-slate roof. On the left of the entrance front is a timber-framed wing with a jettied upper floor. The windows are casements.	II
Hollins Farm; 53.24916°N 2.11463°W		Mid-17th century	The farmhouse was extended in the 19th century. It is built in stone, and has two storeys. The earlier part is on a projecting plinth, its windows are mullioned, and have Tudor hood moulds. To the right of the original part is the 19th-century four-bay extension.	II
Tollett's Farmhouse; 53.22889°N 2.11938°W	—	Late 17th century	A farmhouse in whitewashed stone with a stone-slate roof. It is in two storeys with an attic, and has a two-bay front with two gables. The doorway is to the left, and there is a blocked doorway to the right. The windows are mullioned with Tudor hood moulds. There is a 19th-century extension at the rear.	II
Pot Lords Farmhouse; 53.22268°N 2.07430°W		1693	The farmhouse, once a shooting lodge, is in stone with a stone-slate roof. It is in two storeys, with an attic and a cellar, and consists of a main block with a projecting wing to the right. The windows are mullioned. On the house is a datestone with a coat of arms.	II
Foxbank; 53.22455°N 2.09535°W	—	1691	A stone former farmhouse, with a datestone carved in relief. It is in two storeys, and has a projecting wing on the left containing a porch with a four-centred arch. The windows are mullioned.	II
Ridge Hill Farmhouse; 53.23626°N 2.10060°W		1693	The farmhouse was extended in the 18th century. It is built in stone with a stone-slate roof, and has a brick extension. The farmhouse is in two storeys, and has a two-bay entrance front. On the front is a gabled porch with a ball finial, and the windows are mullioned. The upper floor windows are in dormers, above which are tablets, one carrying a coat of arms, the other the date.	II
Gate piers, Langley Hall; 53.24145°N 2.09358°W	—	c. 1696	A pair of gate piers in stone. They are square and stand on projecting plinths containing oval plaques. The piers are rusticated, and have moulded caps with pyramidal tops and foliate decoration. On one pier is a 19th-century cast iron lamp bracket.	II
Fern Lee Farmhouse; 53.22620°N 2.07807°W		1725	A stone farmhouse with a stone-slate roof. It is in two storeys. On the front, to the left of centre, is a gabled porch with a round head, voussoirs, and a hood mould. Above the porch is a triangular stone inscribed with the date and initials.	II
Barn, Hollins Farm; 53.24910°N 2.11424°W		18th century	The barn is built in stone with a stone-slate roof, and is in two storeys. The barn contains openings, including doorways, windows, ventilation slits, and square pitch holes.	II
Pyegreave Farmhouse; 53.24591°N 2.09513°W	—	Mid-18th century	The farmhouse is built in stone, and has a stone-slate roof. An extension to the left was added later. The farmhouse is in two storeys, and has a two-bay front. The windows are mullioned.	II
Outbuilding, Great Oak Farm; 53.22553°N 2.12135°W		Mid- to late 18th century	The building is in brick and stone and has a slate roof. It is in two storeys and has arched entrances. In the upper storey are diamond-shaped ventilation holes, a square pitch hole, and a datestone with the date erased. There is a later two-bay extension to the right.	II
Manor Farmhouse; 53.23547°N 2.09639°W	—	Late 18th century	A stone farmhouse with a stone-slate roof, it is in two storeys and has a three-bay front. Above the doorway is an ashlar slab carried on brackets, and the windows are sashes.	II
Toll Bar Cottage; 53.23371°N 2.12707°W	—	c. 1780	Originating as a toll cottage, it is in brick with a slate roof. The cottage is in a single storey, and has a canted bay at the right. The windows are sashes with curved heads.	II
Wood Cottage; 53.23514°N 2.11837°W	—	c. 1790	A brick house on a stone plinth with a hipped slate roof. It is in two storeys and has a symmetrical three-bay front. The central bay projects slightly forward, and contains a doorway with Tuscan columns, an entablature with an open pediment, and a fanlight. The windows are sashes.	II
Canal bridge No. 44; 53.24056°N 2.11611°W		c. 1827	The bridge carries Bullocks Lane over the Macclesfield Canal, and was designed by Thomas Telford. It is built in stone and consists of a single arch with voussoirs. On both sides are curving retaining walls ending in piers.	II
Canal bridge No. 45; 53.23709°N 2.12693°W		c. 1827	The bridge carries London Road (A523) over the Macclesfield Canal, and was designed by Thomas Telford. It is built in stone and consists of a single horseshoe arch with voussoirs. On both sides are concave retaining walls ending in piers.	II
Canal bridge No. 46; 53.23548°N 2.13490°W		c. 1827	The bridge carries Gow End Lane over the Macclesfield Canal, and was designed by Thomas Telford. It is built in stone and consists of a single horseshoe arch with voussoirs. On both sides are concave retaining walls ending in piers.	II
Gurnett Aqueduct; 53.24300°N 2.11358°W		c. 1827	The aqueduct carries the Macclesfield Canal over Byrons Lane and a stream, and was designed by Thomas Telford. It is built in stone, and consists of two arches, one over the road, and one over the stream. Both arches are similar with voussoirs and projecting keystones.	II
Canal milestone 53.22547°N 2.12887°W		c. 1830	The milestone on the towpath of the Macclesfield Canal. It is in sandstone and has a shaped top with tooled sides. The milestone is inscribed with the distances in miles to Hall Green and to Marple.	II
Canal bridge No. 43; 53.24457°N 2.11404°W		1831	A combined accommodation bridge and a roving bridge over the Macclesfield Canal, for which the engineer was William Crosley. It is built in Kerridge stone, and is in two sections, with the accommodation bridge being at a higher level. The bridge consists of a single elliptical arch with voussoirs and keystones, the roving bridge carrying the towpath over the canal with a gently graded ramp.	II
Parish boundary stone 53.24228°N 2.06398°W	—	1849	The parish boundary stone is in ashlar sandstone and has a semicircular top. It is inscribed with the initials "S" (for Sutton) and "F" (for Forest).	II
Parish boundary stone 53.20197°N 2.09524°W	—	1849	The parish boundary stone is in sandstone and has a triangular plan with a rounded head. It is inscribed with the initials "S" (for Sutton) and "W" (for Wincle).	II
Parish boundary stone 53.21004°N 2.06327°W	—	1849	The parish boundary stone has a rectangular plan and a semicircular top. It is inscribed with the initials "S" (for Sutton) and "W" (for Wincle).	II
Parish boundary stone 53.21166°N 2.06107°W	—	1849	The parish boundary stone has a rectangular plan and a semicircular top. It is inscribed with the initials "S" (for Sutton) and "W" (for Wincle).	II
Parish boundary stone 53.22936°N 2.04930°W	—	1849	The parish boundary stone is in sandstone and has a triangular plan with a domed top. It is inscribed with the initials "S" (for Sutton), "F" (for Forest), and "W" (for Wildboarclough).	II
Parish boundary stone 53.24227°N 2.06402°W	—	1849	The parish boundary stone has a rectangular plan and an arched top. It is inscribed with the initials "S" (for Sutton) and "F" (for Forest).	II
Parish boundary stone 53.22935°N 2.04928°W	—	1849	The parish boundary stone is in sandstone and has a triangular plan with a domed top. It is inscribed with the initials "S" (for Sutton), "F" (for Forest), and "W" (for Wildboarclough).	II
Parish boundary stone 53.21035°N 2.06321°W	—	1849	The parish boundary stone is a rectangular sandstone block with an arched top. It is inscribed with the initials "S" (for Sutton) and "W" (for Wincle).	II
Parish boundary stone 53.20940°N 2.06594°W	—	1849	The parish boundary stone is a rectangular sandstone block with an arched top. It is inscribed with the initials "S" (for Sutton) and "W" (for Wincle).	II
Parish boundary stone 53.20789°N 2.07002°W	—	1849	The parish boundary stone is a rectangular sandstone block with a semicircular head. It is inscribed with the initials "S" (for Sutton) and "W" (for Wincle).	II
Parish boundary stone 53.20937°N 2.06595°W	—	1849	The parish boundary stone is a rectangular sandstone block with a semicircular head. It is inscribed with the initials "S" (for Sutton) and "W" (for Wincle).	II
Parish boundary stone 53.21132°N 2.05832°W	—	1849	The parish boundary stone is a rectangular sandstone block with a semicircular head. It is inscribed with the initials "S" (for Sutton) and "W" (for Wincle).	II
Parish boundary stone 53.21338°N 2.10671°W	—	1849 (probable)	The parish boundary stone is in sandstone and has a triangular plan with a rounded head. It is inscribed with the initials "S" (for Sutton), "G" (for Gawsworth), and "B" (for Bosley).	II
Mileplate; 53.22673°N 2.12835°W	—	Mid-19th century	The mileplate is in cast iron. It is rectangular and contains the distances in miles to London and to Macclesfield.	II
Sutton Lane Ends Bridge; 53.23669°N 2.10773°W	—	1859	The bridge carries Church Lane over the Rossendale Brook. It is built in stone and consists of a single elliptical arch with voussoirs, a keystone and a hood mould. The retaining walls are curved and end in piers.	II
Sutton Oaks; 53.22383°N 2.12433°W	—	Late 19th century	A country house designed by Thomas Worthington. It is built in sandstone with a Welsh slate roof. The house has an irregular plan, and is mainly in two storeys. Its features include a three-storey tower containing a parapet with ball finials, canted bay windows, and gabled dormers. The windows are sashes. The house has been converted for use as a care centre.	II
Lyme Green Hall; 53.23343°N 2.12645°W	—	c. 1912	A small country house that was extended in the 1930s. It is built in stone with a slate roof, and is in two storeys with an attic. The entrance block has a symmetrical three-bay front, and a central doorway with pilasters, a fanlight and an open pediment. There are two dormers with flat roofs. To the right is a two-bay extension, with another two-bay extension to the right of that. The garden front is in nine bays, the three central bays being recessed. Most of the windows are sashes, with French windows in the garden front.	II
