= Sutton Lane Ends =

Village in Cheshire, England

Coordinates: 53.237962°N 2.106114°W

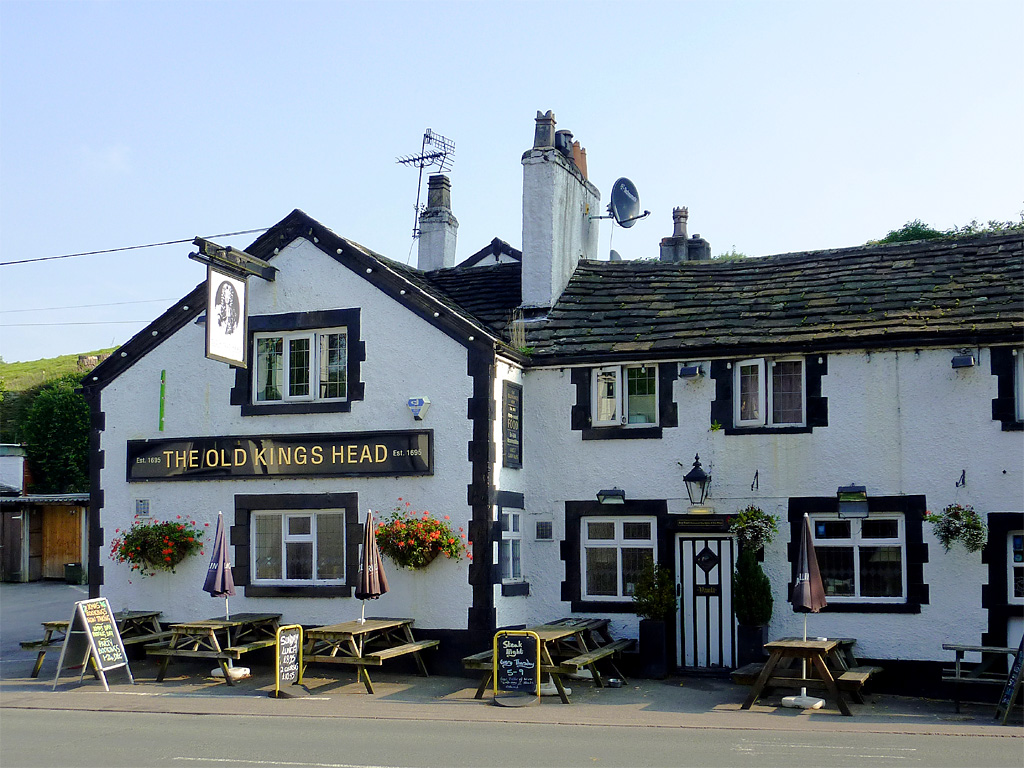
- The Old Kings Head, Gurnett

- Location within Cheshire
- Area: 0.3950 km^{2} (0.1525 sq mi)
- Population: 936 (2020 estimate)
  - Density: 2,370/km^{2} (6,100/sq mi)
- OS grid reference: SJ930712
- Civil parish: Sutton
- Unitary authority: Cheshire East
- Ceremonial county: Cheshire
- Region: North West
- Country: England
- Sovereign state: United Kingdom
- Post town: MACCLESFIELD
- Postcode district: SK11
- Dialling code: 01260
- Police: Cheshire
- Fire: Cheshire
- Ambulance: North West
- UK Parliament: Macclesfield

Sutton Lane Ends or Sutton is a semi-rural village and civil parish, approximately one mile south of Macclesfield. In 2020 it had an estimated population of 936. The parish includes the villages of Langley and Oakgrove and the hamlets of Gurnett, Jarman and Lyme Green. Sutton is in the unitary authority of Cheshire East and the ceremonial county of Cheshire, England. The rivers Bollin and Rosendale run through Sutton Lane Ends, as does the Macclesfield Canal.

The population of the entire civil parish is 2,464. In the past, the community was centred on farming, forestry and textiles; however, since these industries declined, most of the population now travel to nearby Macclesfield or Manchester for employment.

Sutton Lane Ends has had an Anglican church, Sutton St. James, since 1840. The community of Sutton is served by a village shop, primary school (Hollinhey Primary School) and five public houses.

== Education ==
Sutton is served by Hollinhey Primary School for pupils aged 4–11. On leaving primary school, children usually attend one of the four high schools in Macclesfield (All Hallows Catholic College, Macclesfield, The Fallibroome Academy, The Macclesfield Academy or Tytherington High School).

== Notable people ==
- Charles Tunnicliffe, the renowned naturalistic painter of British birds and other wildlife, spent his early years living on a farm on Walker Lane in Sutton. His work is still celebrated with the Charles and Winifred Tunnicliffe Memorial Art Competition, which is held annually at Hollinhey Primary School.
- The engineer James Brindley (1716–1772) undertook his apprenticeship in Gurnett in about 1733. A plaque commemorating this fact can still be seen on Plough Cottage.
- Christine Tacon (born 1959), the Groceries Code Adjudicator, lives here.

== See also ==
- Listed buildings in Sutton, Cheshire East
