= Listed buildings in North Rode =

North Rode is a civil parish in Cheshire East, England. It contains 16 buildings that are recorded in the National Heritage List for England as designated listed buildings, all of which are at Grade II. This grade is the lowest of the three gradings given to listed buildings and is applied to "buildings of national importance and special interest". Apart from the village of North Rode, the parish is rural, and most of the listed buildings are houses and associated structures, farmhouses, and farm buildings. The other listed buildings are a lock on the Macclesfield Canal, a railway viaduct, two road bridges, a school, and a church.

Name and location	Photograph	Date	Notes
Colley Mill House; 53.18917°N 2.16362°W	—	Late 17th century	The house is in two storeys with an attic. The lower storey is in brick painted to simulate timber-framing, and the upper part is timber-framed with brick infill. A brick cottage was added to the right in the 19th century, and a single-storey brick extension to the left in the 20th century. The windows are casements, and there is a dormer in the attic. Inside the original house is an inglenook.
Colley Mill Bridge; 53.18918°N 2.16401°W		17th or early 18th century	The bridge carries the A54 road over the River Dane. It is built in stone and consists of two segmental arches with voussoirs and hood moulds. On the downstream side the cutwater rises to form a pedestrian refuge at the level of the parapet. The bridge is also a scheduled monument.
The Grange; 53.20173°N 2.15404°W	—	Mid- to late 18th century	A country house in brick with stone dressings in two storeys. On the front is a central doorway with a wooden moulded doorcase. To the left of this is a projecting semi-octagonal bay, and further to the left is another projecting bay. The windows are sashes.
Farm building, The Grange; 53.20206°N 2.15436°W	—	c. 1780	The farm building is in brick on a stone plinth and has a slate roof. It is in two storeys and has a symmetrical eleven-bay front. The central three bays project forward, are taller than the rest, and contain three basket arches. The outermost bays also project, and are gabled.
Stable block, The Grange; 53.20190°N 2.15329°W	—	c. 1780	The stable block is in brick with a slate roof. The main range is in two storeys, and includes an archway with a gable containing a round clock face. On each side is a single-story range with circular windows in the gables.
Cow Bridge; 53.19245°N 2.16160°W	—	Early 19th century	The bridge carries Church Lane over Cow Brook. It is built in stone and consists of a single elliptical arch with voussoirs and hood moulds. There are abutments on both sides.
Oaklands; 53.19076°N 2.15058°W	—	Early 19th century	A brick house on a stone plinth with stone dressings and a slate roof. It is in two storeys and has a symmetrical three-bay front. Three steps lead up to a central doorway. The windows are sashes.
Bosley Lock No. 6; 53.19164°N 2.14388°W		c. 1831	The lock is on the Macclesfield Canal, for which the engineer was William Crosley. It is in gritstone with the upper end being semicircular, and there is a flight of eight steps to the east. Crossing the lock is a cast iron footbridge.
Daintry Hall Preparatory School; 53.19568°N 2.16777°W		1835	This was built as the village hall, and used later a school. It is built in stone, and has a rectangular plan, with a porch to the right and an extension to the left. There is a bellcote on the ridge, and the bargeboards around the roof and gables are decorated. Along the side are three windows containing arched tracery.
Rode Hall Farmhouse; 53.19335°N 2.16496°W		Early to mid-19th century	A brick farmhouse with stone dressings and a stone-slate roof. It is in two storeys with an attic and has a three-bay entrance front. There is a central doorway with a fanlight. The windows are mullioned and contain sashes on the front and casements on the back. The gable ends contain lunette windows in the attic.
Farm buildings, Rode Hall Farm; 53.19313°N 2.16436°W		Early to mid-19th century	The farm buildings are in brick with stone dressings and a stone-slate roof. They have an L-shaped plan, and are in two storeys. The longer, western range is symmetrical with eleven bays. The central bay projects forward and has a pedimented gable. The north range is in two bays. The buildings contain stable doors and other doorways, and lunettes, some of which are blocked.
The Manor; 53.20036°N 2.16246°W		1838–40	A country house built in stuccoed brick with stone dressings and a slate roof. It is in two storeys, and has an entrance front of five bays, the left two bays projecting forward. There is a porch with Tuscan columns, and a doorway with pilasters and a fanlight. Also on the front is a canted bay window, and there is another on the right side. On the left side is a tower with a pyramidal roof. The windows are sashes.
Garden ornament, The Manor; 53.19985°N 2.16196°W	—	1838–40	This was originally the porch of the house, moved into the garden. It is in Gothic style. The structure consists of four columns supporting a canopy, with arches on the front and sides. The spandrels contain panels with daggers, and above the arches is a frieze.
Stables, The Manor; 53.20091°N 2.16257°W	—	1838–40	The stable block is built in brick with stone dressings and a slate roof. The central bay is in two storeys and has a pyramidal roof. This is flanked by single-storey ranges, outside which are projecting two-storey wings. The left wing has been converted into a house.
St Michael's Church; 53.19578°N 2.16714°W		1845–46	The church was designed by Charles and James Trubshaw. Two of its doorways are in Norman style, and the rest of the church is Early English. The church is built in stone and has a tiled roof. It consists of a nave, a chancel, a northwest porch, a southeast vestry, and a west tower with a higher stair turret. On the tower is a clock face, and its parapet is plain.
Congleton Viaduct; 53.18801°N 2.15686°W		1849	The viaduct was designed by J. C. Forsyth for the North Staffordshire Railway to cross the River Dane. It is constructed in red and blue engineering brick and consists of 20 semicircular arches carried on rectangular piers.
