= North Rode =

Village in Cheshire, England

Coordinates: 53.195825°N 2.166706°W

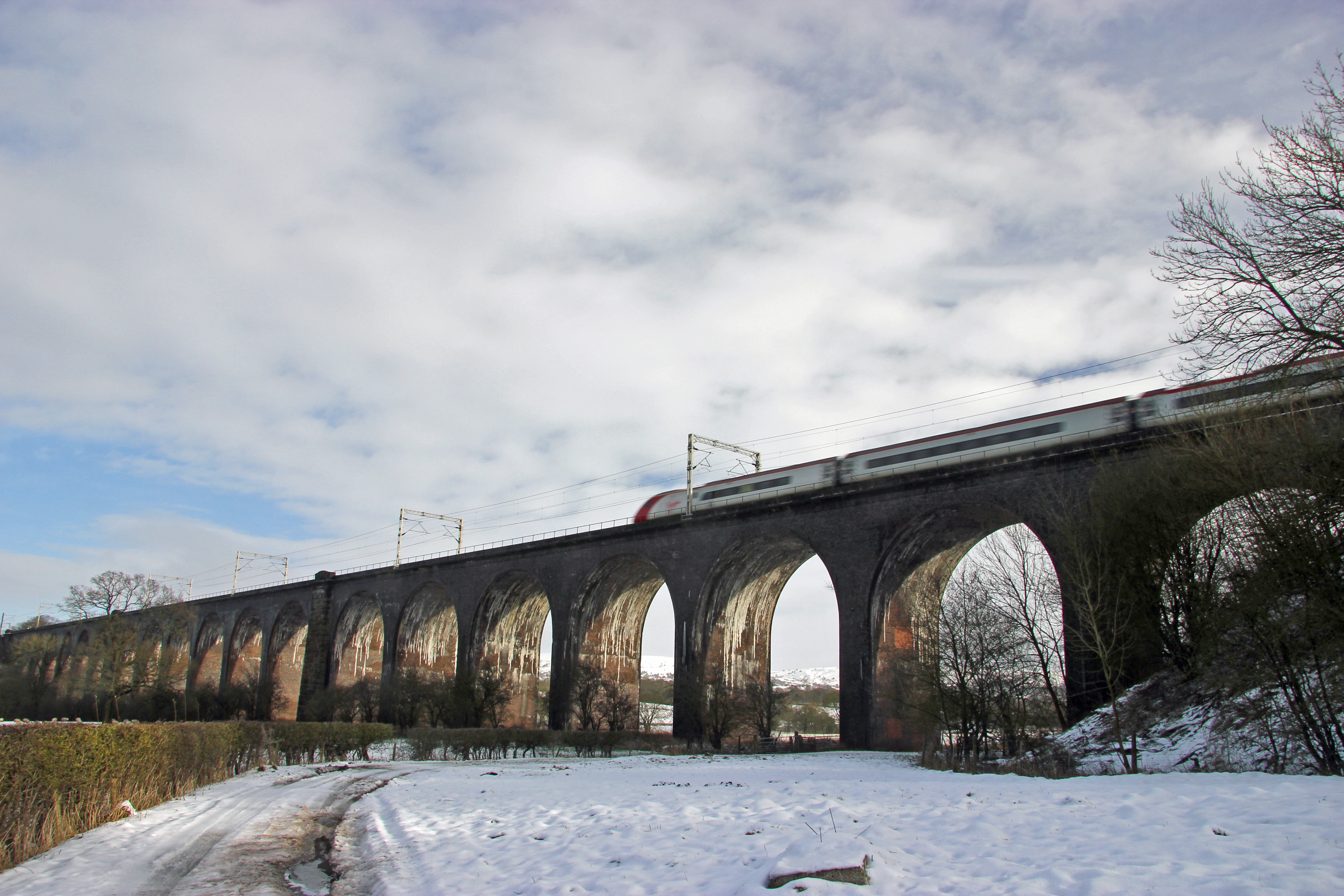
- North Rode Viaduct

- Location within Cheshire
- Population: 178 (2001)
- OS grid reference: SJ889665
- Civil parish: North Rode
- Unitary authority: Cheshire East
- Ceremonial county: Cheshire
- Region: North West
- Country: England
- Sovereign state: United Kingdom
- Post town: Congleton
- Postcode district: CW12
- Dialling code: 01260
- Police: Cheshire
- Fire: Cheshire
- Ambulance: North West
- UK Parliament: Macclesfield

North Rode is a small village and civil parish in the unitary authority of Cheshire East and the ceremonial county of Cheshire, England. According to the 2001 census, the population of the entire civil parish was 178.

== History ==
North Rode was originally a township in Prestbury ancient parish, and it was also part of Macclesfield Hundred. In the 19th century, it was also placed in Macclesfield poor law union and rural sanitary district. In 1866, it was placed in Macclesfield rural district, and at the same time it became a separate civil parish. There was a small change to the boundary of the civil parish in 1936.

The picturesque church is dedicated to St Michael and was built 1845–6. At that time North Rode became a separate ecclesiastical parish in Macclesfield rural deanery. In 1873 it was assigned to Macclesfield South rural deanery, and in 1880, it reassigned back into the re-established Macclesfield deanery. The church is part of a combined benefice with Gawsworth, sharing William A Pwaisiho, Hon. Assistant Bishop of Chester, as Rector.

North Rode's parliamentary representation, after the Reform Act 1832 began with it being in the Cheshire Northern Division parliamentary constituency. In 1867 until 1885, it was placed in the Cheshire North Division parliamentary constituency, and from 1885 until 1948 it was in the Knutsford Division parliamentary constituency. Since 1948 it has been in Macclesfield County Constituency.

The village hall is known as Daintry Hall and is occupied by a children's day nursery.

The West Coast Main Line crosses the River Dane on a 20-arch viaduct and then runs parallel with the Macclesfield Canal to the east of the village; until it was closed in the 1960s, a branch of the North Staffordshire Railway from Uttoxeter joined the main line here.

== See also ==
- Listed buildings in North Rode

== Notes and references ==
=== Bibliography ===
- Youngs, F. A. (1991). Guide to the local administrative units of England. (Volume 1: Northern England). London: Royal Historical Society. ISBN 0-86193-127-0.
