= Listed buildings in Heaton, Staffordshire =

Heaton is a civil parish in the district of Staffordshire Moorlands, Staffordshire, England. It contains 16 listed buildings that are recorded in the National Heritage List for England. All the listed buildings are designated at Grade II, the lowest of the three grades, which is applied to "buildings of national importance and special interest". Apart from the village of Heaton, the parish is entirely rural. The parish contains a country house, which is listed together with associated structures, and all the other listed buildings are farmhouses and farm buildings.

== Buildings ==
Name and location	Photograph	Date	Notes
Cross northwest of Swythamley Hall; 53.18092°N 2.04601°W	—	12th century (probable)	The cross, which was restored in the 19th century, is in gritstone, and is about 2 metres (6 ft 7 in) high. It has a circular base, and a tapering circular shaft with double string courses, above which it is chamfered. On the top is a 19th-century square cross.
Hannel Farm; 53.17316°N 2.05954°W	—	16th century	The farm consists of a farmhouse, a cowhouse and a pigsty. The farmhouse, which was altered later, has a timber framed core with cruck construction, the outer walls are in sandstone, and the roof is of stone slate. There are two storeys and four bays, and the windows are replacement casements. Inside the building are two cruck frames. The cowhouse is at right angles and the pigsty is to the northeast; both are in stone with some brick, and have slate roofs.
Hawksley Farmhouse; 53.16216°N 2.06077°W	—	17th century	The farmhouse was refronted and extended in the 19th century. It is in stone and has a tile roof with verge parapets to the south. There are two storeys and four bays, and a lower recessed two-bay extension to the right. In the original part is an inserted 20th-century windows, and the other windows are mullioned; in the extension are casement windows.
Hillylees Farmhouse; 53.17628°N 2.04240°W	—	17th century	The farmhouse was extended in the 19th century. It is in stone, with a tile roof that has verge parapets with moulded copings on the left and shaped kneelers. There are two storeys and a T-shaped plan, with a front range and two parallel ranges at the rear. The front has five bays, the left two bays gabled. The left bay contains a coach entry, and in the second bay is a hipped bay window. The other three bays are recessed, and in the angle is a porch. The windows are a mix of casements with chamfered mullions, and 19th-century casements.
Tofthall; 53.15994°N 2.06467°W	—	17th century	A farmhouse that was altered and extended in the following two centuries, it is in stone and has a stone slate roof with verge parapets on moulded and carved kneelers. There is a central range of three bays, a projecting gabled cross-wing with two bays and a finial to the right, both parts with two storeys and attics, a later recessed extension to the left with two bays and two storeys, and a rear wing. In the older parts the windows are sashes or replacement casements, in the attics there are windows with chamfered mullions, and in the later extension the windows are casements.
Heatonlow Farmhouse; 53.16627°N 2.07029°W	—	1651	The farmhouse, which was largely rebuilt in the 19th century, is in stone, and has a tile roof with verge parapets on shaped corbelled kneelers. There are two storeys and four bays. The central entrance has a porch with a Tudor arched doorway flanked by engaged Doric columns on plinths with diamond patterns, and has a pedimented gable with low-relief ornament in the tympanum, flanked by obelisk finials. The windows are 20th-century three-light casements.
Fairboroughs Farmhouse; 53.14529°N 2.06491°W	—	1673	The farmhouse, which was altered in the 19th century, is mainly in stone, the rear wall has been rebuilt in brick, and it has a tile roof with verge parapets on corbelled kneelers. There are two storeys and an attic, and an H-shaped plan, consisting of a hall range flanked by projecting gabled cross-wings, and there is a kitchen wing. The doorway has a Tudor arch and a datestone above, and most of the windows have chamfered mullions.
Bearda Farmhouse; 53.17567°N 2.05765°W		Late 17th century	The farmhouse was extended in the 19th century. It is in stone and has stone slate roofs. There are two storeys and an attic, and a T-shaped plan, consisting of a 17th-century cross-wing on the right, and a 19th-century two-bay range to the left. The windows in the cross-wing are mullioned, and the attic window has a cornice; the windows in the later range are sashes.
Hangingstone Farmhouse; 53.18474°N 2.04403°W	—	Late 17th century	A stone farmhouse with quoins and a stone slate roof with verge parapets. There are two storeys and four bays. The doorway to the left has a massive lintel. The windows in the upper floor have chamfered mullions, and in the ground floor they are 19th-century casements. All the openings have hood moulds.
Stable block northeast of Swythamley Hall; 53.17883°N 2.04178°W	—	1691	The stable block was substantially altered in 1860, retaining some earlier material. It is in red and yellow sandstone with a string course, a moulded eaves band and a hipped slate roof. There are two storeys and a U-shaped plan around a courtyard, with a front range of five bays and side wings of three bays. On the front the middle bay projects under a pediment with a clock in the tympanum. The bay contains an elliptical-headed coach entry with a datestone above, and on the roof is a cupola with corner piers and an ogee dome. The outer bays contain round-headed windows in the ground floor and square windows above.
Barn east of Hillylees Farmhouse; 53.17647°N 2.04189°W	—	1701	The barn is in stone with massive quoins and lintels, and a stone slate roof. There are two levels, consisting of a hay loft over a byre, and four bays. In the upper level are four hay loft doors, and the ground floor contains three top-hung casements and two doors, with a datestone over the left door. There are vents in both floors.
Shaw Farmhouse, byre and barn 53.15383°N 2.05615°W	—	Mid 18th century	The farmhouse and adjoining farm buildings are in stone with quoins, and a tile roof with verge parapets on shaped kneelers. There are two storeys and a long range of about 35 metres (115 ft). The openings in the house are a doorway with a heavy lintel, and casement windows, and the farm buildings contain doorways, a loft door, and vents, and there are external stone steps on the gable end.
Gates, gateway and entrance screen, Swythamley Hall; 53.17837°N 2.04348°W	—	Late 18th century	Flanking the entrance to the drive are four square piers, each about 2.5 metres (8 ft 2 in) high, with a frieze, a cornice, a vase with a gadrooned bowl and rim, and an acorn finial. Between the outer and central piers are railings on a plinth, and between the centre piers are ornate crested and segmental-headed wrought iron gates.
Barn north of Hillylees Farmhouse; 53.17645°N 2.04244°W	—	Early 19th century	The barn, coach house and stables are in stone with quoins and a stone slate roof. There are two levels and three bays. In the centre is a full-height elliptically-head coach entry which is flanked by doorways, and in the gable apices are circular pitching holes.
Swythamley Hall; 53.17838°N 2.04230°W	—	Early 19th century	A country house that was considerably enlarged in about 1897, it is in stone with quoins, and has a hipped slate roof. The long entrance front has an irregular plan, with a continuous cornice and eaves. There are two storeys, and the central part also has attics. The north and south wings have three bays each, and contain sash windows. Between the north bay and the central part is a three-stage Italianate tower. The central part has a single-storey bay window on the left, and a two-storey flat-roofed porch on the right with a round-arched entry. The windows in this part are mullioned and transomed, and there are three gabled dormers.
Kennels north of stables, Swythamley Hall; 53.17908°N 2.04136°W	—	Early 19th century	The kennels are in stone with a slate roof. There are three kennels, each with a door, and at the right end is a dovecote. In front are three runs with a stone plinth about 1 metre (3 ft 3 in) high, and railings up to 2 metres (6 ft 7 in) high. At the corners are square piers, and each entrance has cast iron columns with ball finials and a round arch.
