= Archdeacon of Macclesfield =

Church of England ecclesiastical office

The Archdeacon of Macclesfield is a senior ecclesiastical officer within the Diocese of Chester. As such she or he is responsible for the disciplinary supervision of the clergy within its six rural deaneries: Bowdon, Congleton, Knutsford, Macclesfield, Mottram, Nantwich, Chadkirk, Cheadle and Stockport.

The archdeaconry of Macclesfield was created from the Chester archdeaconry on 21 September 1880 (the Diocese of Liverpool having been created from the Liverpool archdeaconry earlier that year).

== List of archdeacons ==
- 1880–1884 (res.): James Kelly
- 1884–1893 (res.): Arthur Gore
- 1893–1904 (res.): Maxwell Woosnam
- 1904–28 December 1918 (d.): Maitland Wood
- 1919–27 April 1922 (d.): Edward Mercer
- 1922–7 January 1932 (d.): John Thorpe
- 1932–26 October 1941 (d.): John Armitstead
- 1941–7 October 1950 (d.): Frank Okell (also Bishop suffragan of Stockport from 1949)
- 1950–1958 (ret.): Tyler Whittle (afterwards archdeacon emeritus)
- 1958–4 April 1965 (d.): Thomas Clarke
- 1965–13 May 1967 (d.): Harry Saunders
- 1967–1978 (ret.): Francis House (afterwards archdeacon emeritus)
- 1978–1985 (ret.): Rennie Simpson (afterwards archdeacon emeritus)
- 1985–1994 (res.): John Gaisford
- 1994–2010 (ret.): Richard Gillings (afterwards archdeacon emeritus)
- 2011 – 29 September 2023: Ian Bishop (became Bishop of Thetford)
- 28 April 2024 – present: Jane Proudfoot
