= Old Rectory, Stockport =

Listed building in Greater Manchester, England

Old Rectory
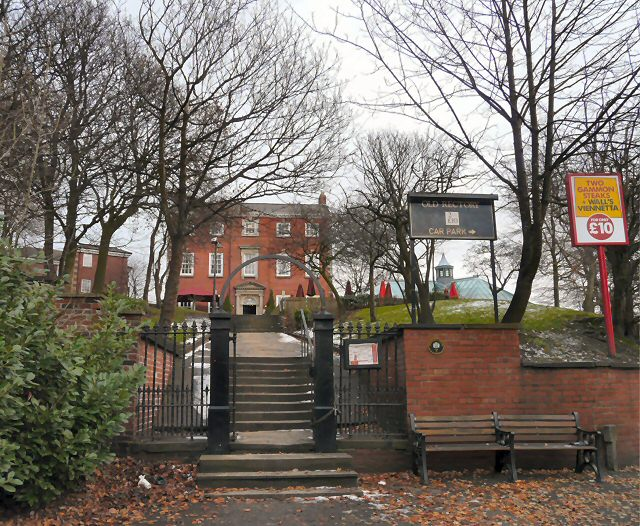
- The building in 2010

- Location within Greater Manchester

General information
- Status: Up for sale (as of September 2026)
- Type: Rectory (former); Pub-restaurant (1991–2026)
- Architectural style: Georgian
- Location: Churchgate, Stockport, Greater Manchester, England
- Coordinates: 53.4099°N 2.1530°W
- Year built: Mid-18th century
- Renovated: 1991 (converted)
- Owner: Hungry Horse

Technical details
- Material: Brick, Welsh slate
- Floor count: 3

Listed Building – Grade II*
- Official name: Former Rectory
- Designated: 14 May 1952
- Reference no.: 1356827

The Old Rectory is a Grade II* listed Georgian building on Churchgate in Stockport, Greater Manchester, England. Built in the mid-18th century for Reverend Samuel Stead to replace an earlier parsonage, it was later used as an army billet during the Second World War and from 1951 to 1965 was the residence of David Saunders-Davies, the second bishop of Stockport. Converted into a pub‑restaurant in 1991 after its purchase by Boddingtons Brewery, it has since had several operators, most recently the Hungry Horse chain. The building closed in April 2026 and was subsequently put up for sale.

== History ==
The building was constructed in the mid-18th century, according to its official listing, (Note: Stockport Metropolitan Borough Council states a construction date of 1743.) and was built for Reverend Samuel Stead, rector of St Mary's Church from 1742 to 1749. It replaced an earlier parsonage and was later used as an army billet during the Second World War.

The building last served ecclesiastical functions between 1951 and 1965, during which time it was the residence of David Saunders-Davies, the second bishop of Stockport. On 14 May 1952, it was designated a Grade II* listed building.

Following its conversion, the multi-room pub and restaurant opened in 1991 after Boddingtons Brewery acquired the property. It has since changed ownership multiple times, with the most recent proprietor being Hungry Horse, a pub chain owned by Greene King.

On 30 April 2026, the Old Rectory closed and was subsequently placed on the market for sale. As of September 2026, its future use has not yet been confirmed.

== Architecture ==
The building is constructed in brick with stone detailing, featuring rusticated quoins, a moulded wooden eaves cornice, and a roof of Welsh slate. It has three storeys with a symmetrical five-bay façade, complemented by a single-storey, three-bay extension on the right. The central bay projects slightly and includes an entrance framed by Ionic columns, topped with an entablature, a dentilled pediment, and a segmental fanlight.

== Archaeology ==
In 1991 an archaeological survey conducted by the Greater Manchester Archaeological Unit uncovered evidence of a timber-framed structure predating the current building on the site. The investigation also revealed a well-preserved icehouse dating from the early 19th century. Additionally, the grounds showed signs of significant modifications during the 18th and 19th centuries, including various landscaping features.

== See also ==
- Grade II* listed buildings in Greater Manchester
- Listed buildings in Stockport
