= Robert Atwell =

British Anglican bishop and writer

The Right Reverend Robert Atwell
- Bishop of Exeter
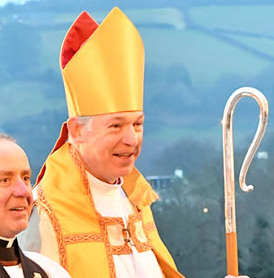
- Bishop Atwell in 2017
- Church: Church of England
- Diocese: Diocese of Exeter
- In office: 2014–2023
- Predecessor: Michael Langrish
- Other post: Bishop of Stockport (2008–2014)

Orders
- Ordination: 1978 (deacon); 1979 (priest) by Gerald Ellison (deacon); Bill Westwood (priest)
- Consecration: 24 June 2008

Personal details
- Born: 3 August 1954 (age 72) Ilford, Essex, United Kingdom
- Denomination: Anglican
- Residence: The Palace, Exeter
- Education: St John's College, Durham; Westcott House, Cambridge

Member of the House of Lords
- Lord Spiritual
- Bishop of Exeter; 15 November 2021 – 30 September 2023

Robert Ronald Atwell (born 3 August 1954) is a British Anglican retired bishop, writer, and former Benedictine monk. From 2014 until 2023, he served as the Bishop of Exeter; from 2008 to 2014, he was Bishop of Stockport, a suffragan bishop in the Diocese of Chester.

== Early life and education ==
Atwell was born on 3 August 1954 in Ilford, Essex, United Kingdom. He was educated at Wanstead High School, a comprehensive school in Wanstead, London. He studied theology at St John's College, Durham, and graduated with a Bachelor of Arts (BA) degree in 1975. In 1976, he entered Westcott House, Cambridge to train for the priesthood. During his training, he spent a period of time in Rome studying at the Venerable English College, a Roman Catholic seminary, and at the Pontifical Gregorian University, a pontifical university. Following his ordination, he continued his studies and completed a Master of Letters (MLitt) degree from Durham University in 1979.

== Ordained ministry ==
Atwell was ordained in the Church of England: first, made a deacon at Petertide 1978 (25 June), by Gerald Ellison, Bishop of London, at St Paul's Cathedral, and then ordained a priest the following St Peter's Day (29 June 1979) by Bill Westwood, Bishop of Edmonton, at St James Muswell Hill. His career began with a curacy at John Keble Church, Mill Hill in the Diocese of London from 1978 to 1981. From 1981 to 1987, he was chaplain of Trinity College, Cambridge and a lecturer in patristics.

In 1987, he entered the Order of St Benedict (OSB) and was granted permission to officiate in the Diocese of Oxford. He spent ten years as a Benedictine monk at Burford Priory in Oxfordshire. Though he left the OSB in 1998, he maintains his link with the Benedictines as an oblate of Bec Abbey in Normandy, France.

In 1998, he left the OSB to return to parish ministry as Vicar of St Mary's Church, Primrose Hill, an Anglo Catholic parish in the Diocese of London. He held this role from 1998 until joining the episcopate in 2008.

=== Episcopal ministry ===
Atwell was consecrated a bishop at York Minster on 24 June 2008. He was welcomed into the Diocese of Chester as Bishop of Stockport on 27 June 2008 at Chester Cathedral.

On 21 January 2014, it was announced that Atwell would be translated to be the Bishop of Exeter. The confirmation of his election occurred on 30 April 2014. He was installed at Exeter Cathedral on 5 July 2014. He is also chair of the Church of England's Liturgical Commission and the lead bishop for rural affairs.

On 10 September 2021, he joined the House of Lords as a Lord Spiritual. He made his maiden speech on 18 November 2021 during a debate on COP 26.

Atwell stepped back from public duties in July 2023, before he retired from full-time ministry on 30 September 2023.

=== Views ===
Atwell supports the ordination of women to the priesthood and episcopate.

In 2014, he stated that he understood "marriage to be the union of one man and one woman for life, and that is the best and solid way for nurturing of children". However, in 2023, he stated that he welcomes "the proposed prayers of thanksgiving, dedication and God's blessing for same sex couples": this was in reaction to the Living in Love and Faith process that concluded with the suggestion that the Church of England would introduce a service of blessing for same sex couples.

== Personal life ==
Atwell is not married.

== Styles ==
- The Reverend Robert Atwell (1978–1987)
- The Reverend Brother Robert Atwell, OSB (1987–1998)
- The Reverend Robert Atwell (1998–2008)
- The Right Reverend Robert Atwell (2008–present)

== Selected works ==
- Atwell, Robert (1995). Spiritual Classics from the Early Church: an anthology. London: Church House Publishing. ISBN 978-0715148273.
- Atwell, Robert, ed. (1999). Celebrating the Seasons: daily spiritual readings for the Christian year. Norwich: Canterbury Press. ISBN 978-1853112492.
- Atwell, Robert, ed. (2004). Celebrating the Saints: daily spiritual readings to accompany the Calendars of the Church of England, the Church of Ireland, the Scottish Episcopal Church and the Church in Wales. Norwich: Canterbury Press. ISBN 978-1853115653.
- Atwell, Robert, ed. (2005). Remember: 100 readings for bereavement. Norwich: Canterbury Press. ISBN 978-1853116414.
- Atwell, Robert, ed. (2005). Gift: 100 readings for new parents. Norwich: Canterbury Press. ISBN 978-1853116407.
- Atwell, Robert (2011). The Contented Life: spirituality and the gift of years. Norwich: Canterbury Press. ISBN 978-1848250765.
- Atwell, Robert, ed. (2005). Love: 100 Readings for Marriage. Norwich: Canterbury Press. ISBN 978-1853116001.
- Atwell, Robert (2012). Soul Unfinished: finding happiness, taking risks, & trusting God as we grow older. Brewster, MA: Paraclete Press. ISBN 978-1612612362.
- Atwell, Robert (2013). The Good Worship Guide: leading liturgy well. London: Canterbury Press. ISBN 978-1853117190.
- Atwell, Robert (2014). Peace at the Last: Leading Funerals Well. London: Canterbury Press. ISBN 978-1848256668.

Church of England titles
Preceded by Nigel Stock	Bishop of Stockport; 2008–2014	Succeeded by Libby Lane
Preceded by Michael Langrish	Bishop of Exeter; 2014–2023	Succeeded by Mike Harrison
