= Arthur Gore (priest) =

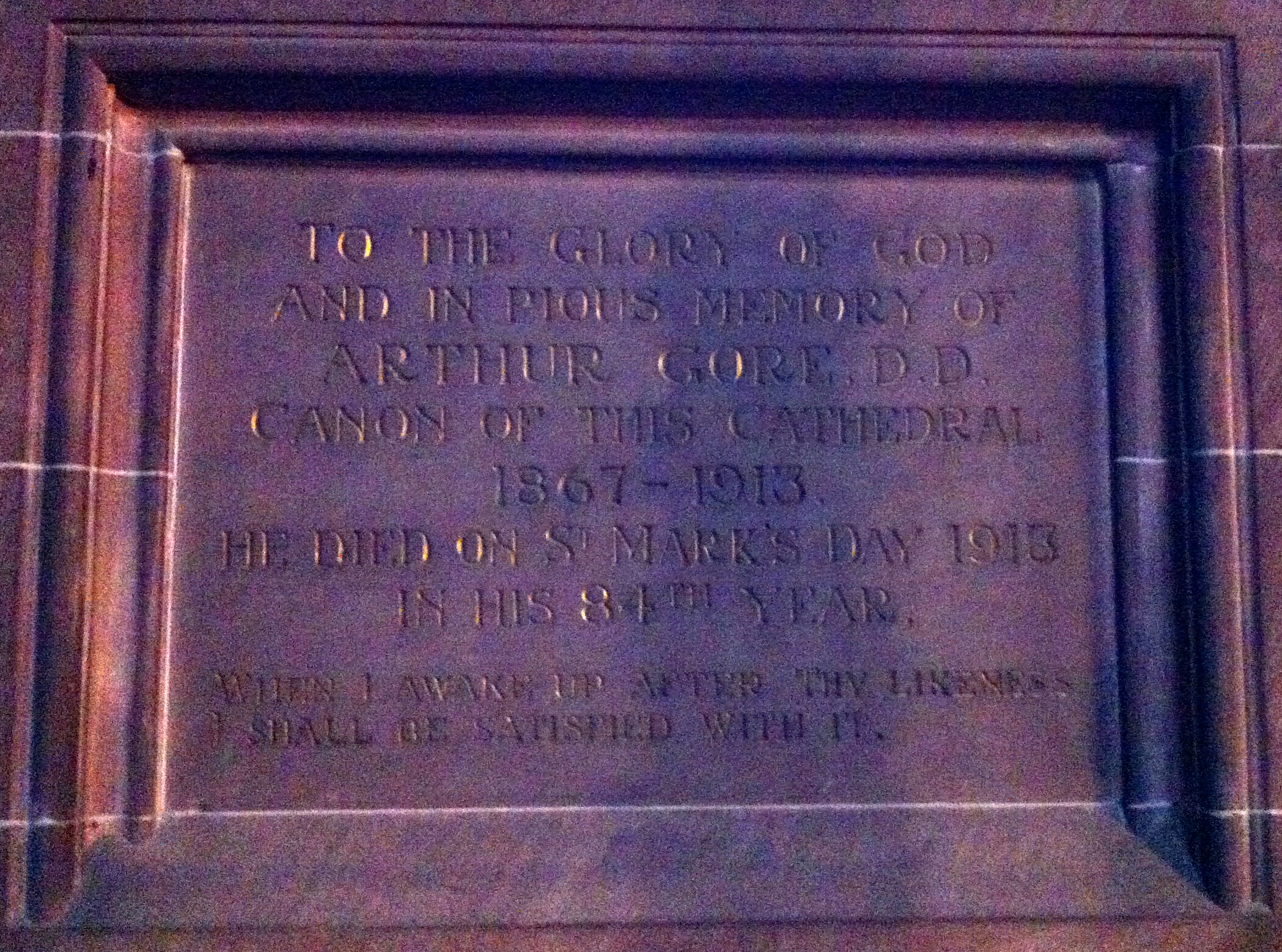
Memorial to Arthur Gore in Chester Cathedral

The Ven. Arthur Gore, DD, MA (1829 – 25 April 1913) was the Archdeacon of Macclesfield and a Canon Residentiary of Chester Cathedral.

He was born in Kilkenny and educated at the town’s college and Trinity College, Dublin. Ordained in 1856 his first post was as the Clerical Superintendent of Liverpool’s ) Church of England Readers Society. He held incumbencies at St Luke’s, Liverpool and St Mary’s, Bowdon, Cheshire after which he was Chaplain to the Bishop of Chester until his appointment to the Diocese’s senior leadership team. He was collated Archdeacon of Macclesfield in 1884 (until 1893) and appointed Canon in 1893 (until his death).

Church of England titles
Preceded by James Butler Knill Kelly	Archdeacon of Macclesfield; 1884 –1893	Succeeded by Charles Maxwell Woosnam
