= Tyler Whittle =

The Venerable John Tyler Whittle (1889–1969) was a Church of England priest. He was Archdeacon of Macclesfield from 1950 until 1958.

Born on 2 December 1889 he was educated at St Augustine's College, Canterbury and ordained in 1920 after World War I service with the North Staffordshire Regiment. His first posts were curacies in Stockport and Seaford. He held incumbencies at Gatley and Nantwich before his years as an Archdeacon.

He died on 27 January 1969.

== Notes ==
Church of England titles
Preceded by Frank Okell	Archdeacon of Macclesfield; 1950–1958	Succeeded by Thomas Clarke
