= Libby Lane =

British Anglican bishop and Lord Spiritual (born 1966)

The Right Reverend Libby Lane
- Bishop of Derby
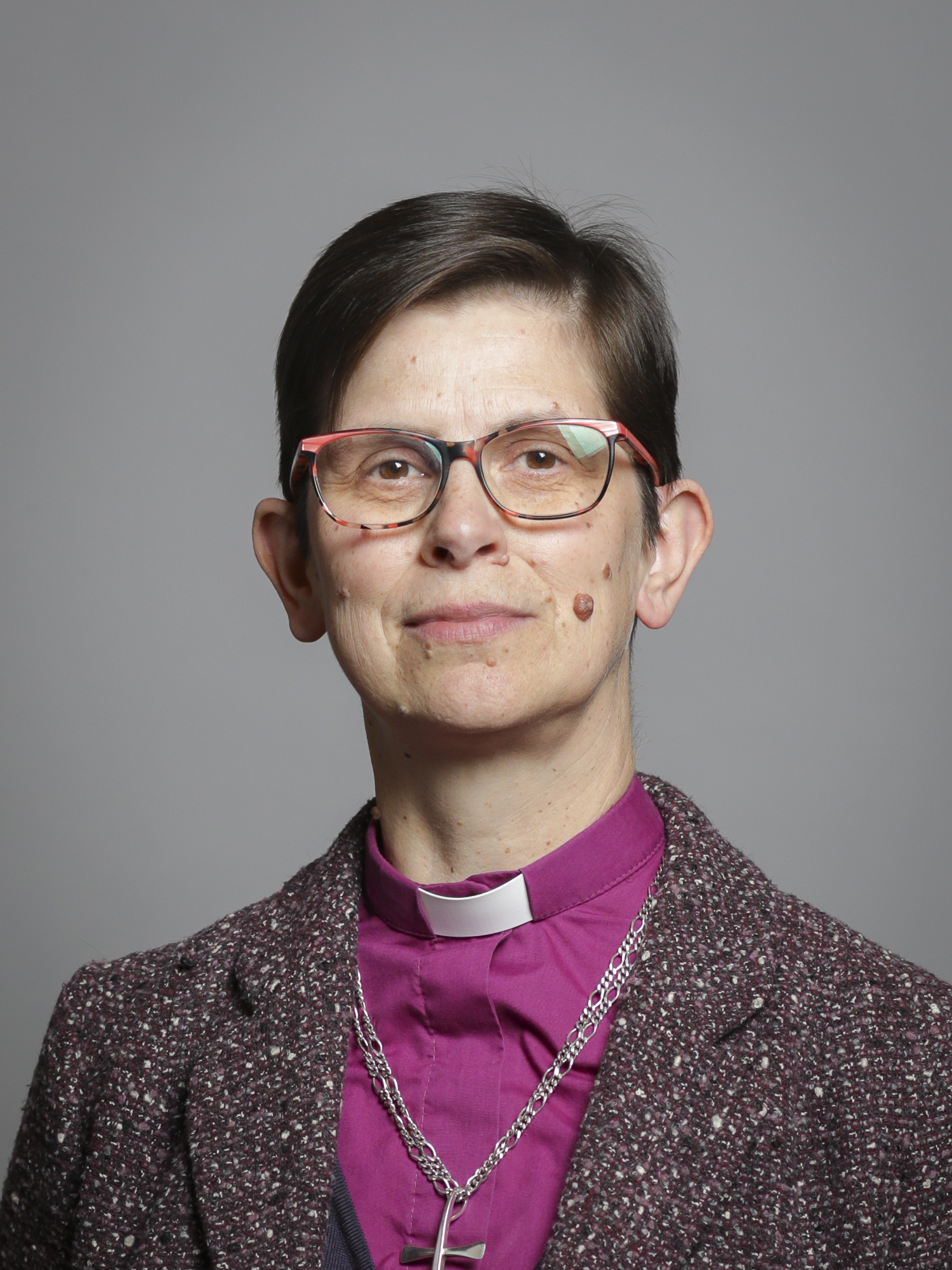
- Lane in 2019
- Church: Church of England
- Diocese: Derby
- In office: 11 February 2019 – present
- Predecessor: Alastair Redfern
- Other posts: Bishop of Stockport (2015–2019); Lord Spiritual (2019–present)

Orders
- Ordination: 1993 (deacon); 1994 (priest)
- Consecration: 26 January 2015 by John Sentamu

Personal details
- Born: Elizabeth Jane Holden; 8 December 1966 (age 59) Wycombe Rural District, Buckinghamshire, UK
- Denomination: Anglican
- Spouse: George Lane (m. 1990)
- Children: 2
- Education: St Peter's College, Oxford; St John's College, Durham

Member of the House of Lords
- Lord Spiritual
- Bishop of Derby; 2 July 2019

Elizabeth Jane Holden Lane (born 8 December 1966) is a British Anglican bishop and Lord Spiritual. Since February 2019, she has served as Bishop of Derby in the Church of England, the diocesan bishop of the Diocese of Derby. From January 2015 to 2019, she was the Bishop of Stockport, a suffragan bishop in the Diocese of Chester. She was the first woman to be appointed as a bishop by the Church of England, after its general synod voted in July 2014 to allow women to become bishops. Her consecration took place on 26 January 2015 at York Minster.

== Early life ==
Lane was born Elizabeth Jane Holden on 8 December 1966 in Wycombe Rural District, Buckinghamshire, England. She was raised in Glossop, Derbyshire. She was educated at Manchester High School for Girls, a private girls' school. In 1986, she matriculated into St Peter's College, Oxford, where she studied theology. She graduated with a Bachelor of Arts (BA) degree in 1989; this was later promoted to a Master of Arts (MA Oxon) degree under the statutes and customs of the university. From 1991 to 1993, she studied for ordination at Cranmer Hall, Durham University.

== Ordained ministry ==
Lane was ordained in the Church of England as a deacon in 1993 and as a priest in 1994, the first year in which women were ordained as priest in the Church of England. She served her curacy at St James's Church, Blackburn, from 1993 to 1996. She served in the Diocese of Chester from 2000 to 2014 and was the vicar of the combined benefice of St Peter's Hale and St Elizabeth's Ashley from 2007. She was also the Dean of Women in Ministry in the diocese from 2010.

In 2013, Lane was elected one of eight participant observers of the House of Bishops as the observer representing the North West of England. The observers were senior female priests who would attend and participate in meetings of the House of Bishops until six women had full membership of the house. She attended her first meeting in December 2013. Lane ceased to be an observer when she was elected, by and from among the suffragan bishops of the Province of York, to the House of Bishops in 2015. As an elected suffragan and later a diocesan bishop, she has been a full member of the house since 2015.

=== Episcopate ===
On 17 December 2014, it was announced that Lane was to become the Bishop of Stockport, a suffragan bishop in the Diocese of Chester. The British prime minister, David Cameron, called her appointment "historic" and "an important step forward for the Church towards greater equality in its senior positions". She was consecrated at York Minster on 26 January 2015 by John Sentamu, the then Archbishop of York. When the archbishop asked the congregation if Lane should be consecrated as a bishop the service was briefly interrupted by an Anglo-Catholic priest, Paul Williamson, who exclaimed "It's not in the Bible" and called Lane's being a woman an "absolute impediment". There was no opposition when Sentamu, having carefully explained the legality of the act, asked a second time.

One of the first duties that Lane undertook as a bishop was her involvement in the consecration service for Philip North as the Bishop of Burnley on 2 February 2015. North is a traditionalist Anglo-Catholic who does not accept the ordination of women. Therefore, Lane and all but three other bishops did not take part in the laying on of hands. (Archbishop John Sentamu rejected suggestions this exemplified a "theology of taint".) Instead, they gathered in prayer around North, with only the three bishops "who share his theological conviction regarding the ordination of women" laying their hands on him. She was installed at Chester Cathedral on 8 March 2015, International Women's Day, signalling the official start of her ministry as Bishop of Stockport.

On 18 December 2018, it was announced that Lane was to become the eighth Bishop of Derby, succeeding Alastair Redfern; she grew up in the diocese, in Glossop. The confirmation of her canonical election took place on 11 February 2019, at which point she legally became the Bishop of Derby. The Diocese of Derby was then the first Church of England diocese to have a woman diocesan bishop and a woman suffragan bishop (Jan McFarlane was then the Bishop of Repton). She was installed at Derby Cathedral on 25 May 2019. She was introduced as a Lord Spiritual at the House of Lords by the Archbishop of Canterbury (Justin Welby) and the former Archbishop of York (John Sentamu) on 2 July 2019.

She has been on sick leave from her episcopal duties since April 2026.

=== Views ===
In November 2023, she was one of 44 Church of England bishops who signed an open letter supporting the use of the Prayers of Love and Faith (i.e. blessings for same-sex couples) and called for "Guidance being issued without delay that includes the removal of all restrictions on clergy entering same-sex civil marriages, and on bishops ordaining and licensing such clergy".

== Personal life ==
Lane married her husband, George Lane, in 1990. They had met while both students at St Peter's College, Oxford, in the late 1980s. He is an Anglican priest and currently the co-ordinating chaplain at Manchester Airport. They were among the first married couples to be ordained at the same time in the Church of England. They have two children, Connie and Benedict.

== Honours ==
Lane was made an honorary fellow of St Peter's College, Oxford (her alma mater) in June 2015. In July 2015, she was awarded an honorary Doctor of Divinity (DD) degree by the University of Wales Trinity Saint David. In July 2017, she was awarded an honorary Doctor of Laws (LLD) by the University of Bath.

Church of England titles
Preceded by Robert Atwell	Bishop of Stockport; 2015–2019	Sam Corley
Preceded by Alastair Redfern	Bishop of Derby; 2019–present	Incumbent
