= Ian Bishop (bishop) =

British Anglican bishop

The Right Reverend Ian Bishop
- Bishop of Thetford
- Church: Church of England
- Diocese: Diocese of Norwich
- In office: September 2023 to present
- Predecessor: Alan Winton
- Other post: Archdeacon of Macclesfield (2011–2023)

Orders
- Ordination: 1991 (deacon); 1992 (priest)
- Consecration: 29 September 2023

Personal details
- Born: Ian Gregory Bishop; 13 November 1962 (age 63)
- Denomination: Anglicanism
- Spouse: Sue
- Children: 3
- Education: Portsmouth Polytechnic; Oak Hill College

Ian Gregory Bishop (born 13 November 1962) is a British Anglican bishop. Since September 2023, he has been Bishop of Thetford, a suffragan bishop in the Church of England's Diocese of Norwich. He was Archdeacon of Macclesfield in the Diocese of Chester from 2011 to 2023.

== Early life and education ==
Bishop was born on 13 November 1962 in Devizes, Wiltshire, England. He was educated at Devizes School, a comprehensive school in the town. He studied urban and land administration at Portsmouth Polytechnic, graduating with a Bachelor of Science (BSc) degree in 1984. He worked as a chartered surveyor, and became a Professional Associate of the Royal Institution of Chartered Surveyors (ARICS) in 1986 or 1987. He was a surveyor for Croydon Council from 1984 to 1986 and an estate manager at Gatwick Airport from 1986 to 1988. He then trained for ordination at Oak Hill College, a conservative evangelical theological college, graduating with a Bachelor of Arts (BA) degree in 1991.

== Ordained ministry ==
Bishop was ordained in the Church of England as a deacon at Petertide 1991 (on 30 June, by Ronald Bowlby, Bishop of Southwark, at Southwark Cathedral) and as a priest the next Petertide (5 July 1992, by Roy Williamson, Bishop of Southwark, at Croydon Parish Church). From 1991 to 1995, he served his curacy at Christ Church, Purley, in the Diocese of Southwark. He then became priest-in-charge of St Mary the Virgin, Saxlingham Nethergate and Shotesham in the Diocese of Norwich. After pastoral reorganisation, he was rector of the newly created Tas Valley Team Ministry from 1998 to 2001. He moved to the Diocese of Chester, and was he was Rector of St Michael and All Angels, Middlewich and St John the Evangelist's Church, Byley from 2001 to 2011. He was additionally rural dean of Middlewich from 2005 to 2010. He left parish ministry and became the Archdeacon of Macclesfield in January 2011.

He is a director of the Simeon Trustees, a trust established in the nineteenth century by Charles Simeon to purchase advowsons for Anglican ministers aligned with the Evangelical Anglicanism.

=== Episcopal ministry ===
On 14 June 2023, it was announced that he would be the next Bishop of Thetford, a suffragan bishop of the Diocese of Norwich. On 29 September 2023, he was consecrated as a bishop by Justin Welby, Archbishop of Canterbury, during a service at Westminster Abbey. He was later welcomed into the Diocese of Norwich as Bishop of Thetford on 30 September 2023 during a service at Norwich Cathedral.

=== Views ===
Bishop supports the introduction of blessings for committed same-sex relationships: "I personally intend to support the agenda of inclusion. [...] I find myself unconvinced that committed same sex relationships should be categorized as sinful."

In November 2023, he was one of 44 Church of England bishops who signed an open letter supporting the use of the Prayers of Love and Faith (i.e. blessings for same-sex couples) and called for "Guidance being issued without delay that includes the removal of all restrictions on clergy entering same-sex civil marriages, and on bishops ordaining and licensing such clergy".

== Personal life ==
In 1986, Bishop married Sue. Together they have three sons.

Church of England titles
Preceded by Richard John Gillings	Archdeacon of Macclesfield; 2011–2023	Succeeded by TBA
