= Maitland Wood =

British religious leader (died 1918)

Alfred Maitland Wood (died 28 December 1918) was Archdeacon of Macclesfield from 1904 to 1918. He was educated at Christ's Hospital and Trinity College, Cambridge and ordained in 1886. After curacies at Tarvin and Wallasey he became Vicar of St Mary's, Liscard in 1878. He held a similar post at Runcorn from 1887 to 1911; and was Rural Dean of Frodsham before his appointment to the Diocese of Chester's senior leadership team.

He died on 28 December 1918.

Church of England titles
Preceded by Maxwell Woosnam	Archdeacon of Macclesfield; 1904 – 1918	Succeeded by John Edward Mercer
