= John Armitstead =

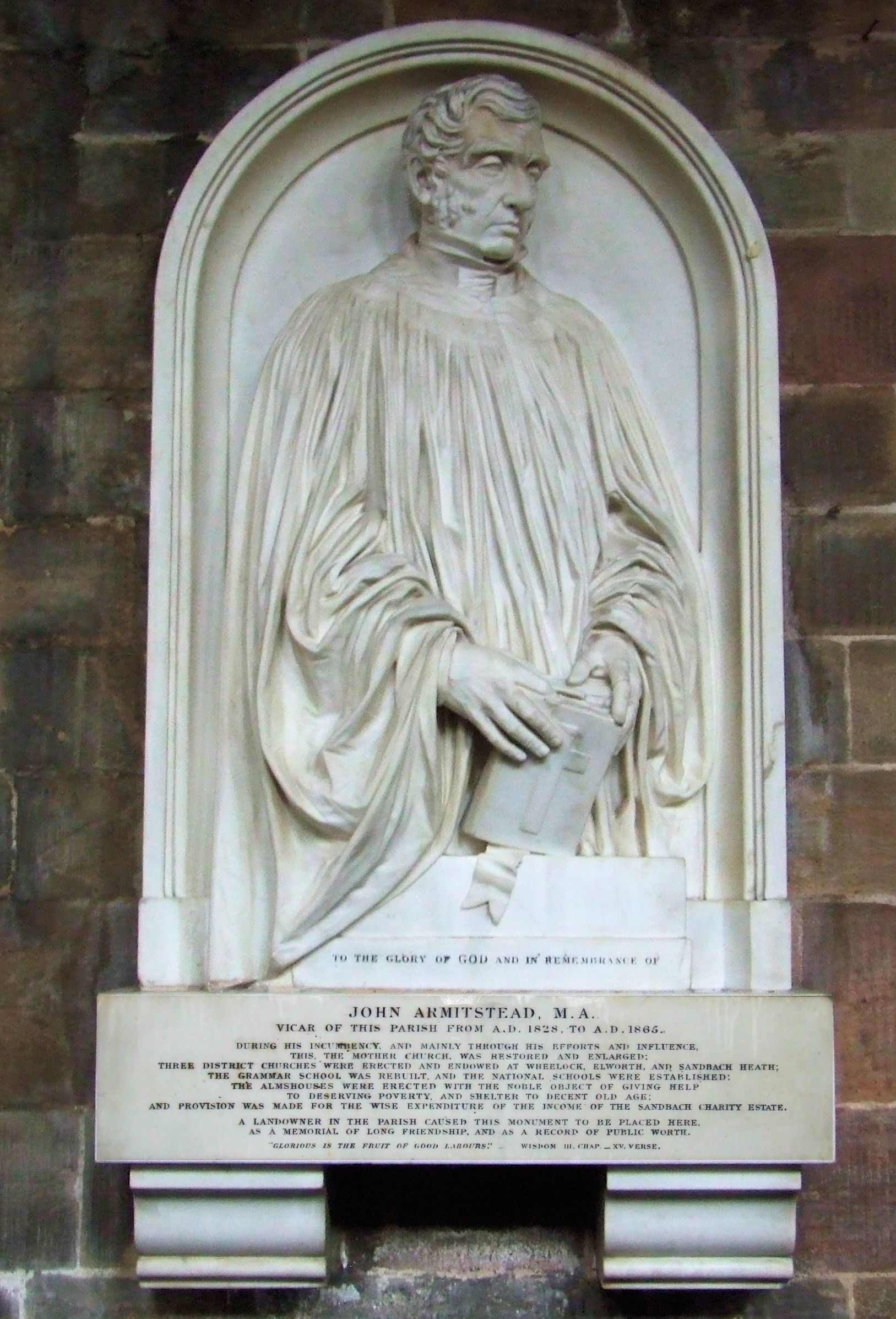
1876 sculpture of Armistead's grandfather, John Armitstead M.A., by George Frederic Watts, sculpted by George Nelson, at St Mary's Church, Sandbach

The Ven. John Hornby Armitstead, MA was Archdeacon of Macclesfield from 1932 until his death in 1941.

Born into an ecclesiastical family in 1868, he was educated at Westminster School and Christ Church, Oxford and ordained in 1892. After a curacy in Sandbach he was the incumbent at Holmes Chapel from 1899 to 1919 when he became Vicar of Sandbach.

He died on 26 October 1941.

== Notes ==
Church of England titles
Preceded by John Henry Thorpe	Archdeacon of Macclesfield; 1932–1941	Succeeded by Frank Jackson Okell
