= Thomas Clarke (Archdeacon of Macclesfield) =

The Ven. Thomas Clarke was an Archdeacon of Macclesfield in the third quarter of the 20th Century.

Born on 28 July 1907 he was educated at Wycliffe Hall, Oxford and ordained in 1941. His first post was a curacy in Farnworth. He was Chaplain for the Government Hostels for War Workers scheme between 1943 and 1945 when he became the incumbent of Thornton Hough. He became Vicar of Macclesfield in 1953, its Rural Dean in 1955 and Archdeacon in 1958.

He died in post on 4 April 1965.

== Notes ==
Church of England titles
| Preceded by John Tyler Whittle | Archdeacon of Macclesfield; 1958–1965 | Succeeded by Harry Patrick Saunders |
