= Maxwell Woosnam (priest) =

The Ven. Charles Maxwell Woosnam MA (6 August 1856 – 7 May 1930) was Archdeacon of Macclesfield from 1893 to 1904.

Woosnam was born in Bombay, the second son of Royal Horse Artillery Maj.-Gen. James Bowen Woosnam (1812 – 1877), of Bicknor Court, Coleford, Gloucestershire, and his wife Agnes, daughter of William Bell, of Bellbrook, Queen's County. His parents were both of landed gentry families; the Woosnam family were of Cefnllysgwynne, Brecknockshire, Wales, originally of Montgomeryshire, and the Bell family of Pendell Court, Bletchingley, Surrey.

Woosnam was educated at Repton and Trinity College, Cambridge. He was ordained in 1880 and his first post was that of Chaplain to the Tyne Mission to Seamen. He was Vicar of St Peter's, Tynemouth from 1881 to 1888; then Rector of Kirby Wiske for a further two years. In 1890 he became Chaplain of the Mersey Mission to Seamen before his years as an Archdeacon. In 1905 he became Vicar of St Margaret's, Dunham Massey; and his final appointment was as Rector of Aberhafesp, a post he resigned in 1923.

In 1886, Woosnam married Mary Seeley, daughter of Hilton Philipson. Their son, also Maxwell Woosnam, was a well-known sportsman.

== Notes ==
Church of England titles
Preceded by Arthur Gore	Archdeacon of Macclesfield; 1893 – 1904	Succeeded by Alfred Maitland Wood
