= Harry Saunders (priest) =

Anglican Archdeacon

Harry Patrick Saunders (16 March 1913 – 13 May 1967) was Archdeacon of Macclesfield from 1965 until 1967.

Saudners was educated at Hanley Castle Grammar School, King's College London, and St Stephen's House and St Catherine's Society, Oxford. He gained an Oxford Master of Arts (MA Oxon) and a Bachelor of Divinity (BD). He was ordained in 1936 and was successively:Chaplain and Lecturer at St Stephen's House, (Vice-Principal, 1938–49); Chaplain of St Edmund Hall, Oxford, 1936–46; Priest in charge of St Peter's, Shrewsbury and an RAF Chaplain, 1939–45; Chaplain of Magdalen College, Oxford, 1946–49; Vicar of St Andrew's, West Bromwich, 1949–51; Vicar of St Mary's, Kingswinford, 1951–56; a Lecturer at Queen's College, Birmingham, 1949–56; a Canon Residentiary of Ely Cathedral and Principal of Ely Theological College, 1956; and Vicar of Holy Trinity, Oswestry, 1957–64. He died in post as Archdeacon of Macclesfield.

Church of England titles
Preceded by Thomas Clarke	Archdeacon of Macclesfield; 1965–1967	Succeeded by Francis House
