= Theology of taint =

The "theology of taint" is a term used in association with belief that a succession of male-only bishops and priests should be maintained within the Church of England. The term is predominantly used by those who oppose this view.

An action associated with the theology of taint is when male bishops who have previously ordained women as priests are excluded from the laying on of hands during ordinations and consecrations.

The phrase is used by Women and the Church (WATCH) and Anglican priest Judith Maltby. The phrase was rejected by John Sentamu, Archbishop of York, when he announced he would not be laying hands on Philip North during his consecration as the Bishop of Burnley on 2 February 2015. Sentamu had laid hands on Libby Lane in her consecration as the first woman as a bishop in the Church of England, on 26 January 2015.
