= Richard Gillings =

Archdeacon of Macclesfield from 1994 to 2010

Richard John Gillings (born 17 September 1945) is a British retired Anglican priest. He served as Archdeacon of Macclesfield from 1994 to 2010.

== Biography ==
He was born on 17 September 1945, he was educated at Sale Grammar School and St Chad's College, Durham. He was ordained after a period of study at Lincoln Theological College in 1971 and began his career with a curacy in Altrincham. After this, he was Priest in charge of St Thomas' Church, Stockport and then Rector of Birkenhead Priory. From 1993 to 2005 he was Vicar of Bramhall. Finally, he was Archdeacon of Macclesfield from 1994 to 2010.

== Notes ==
Church of England titles
Preceded by John Gaisford	Archdeacon of Macclesfield; 1994–2004	Succeeded by Ian Bishop
