= John Thorpe (priest) =

The Venerable John Henry Thorpe, MA, BD (1855 – 7 January 1932) was Archdeacon of Macclesfield from 1921 until his death.

Thorpe was born in West Derby, Liverpool to Irish parents. He was educated at The High School, Dublin and Trinity College, Dublin he held incumbencies at St Peter's, Cork, St Saviour's, Nottingham and St George's, Stockport before his years as an Archdeacon.

He married Martha Aylmer Hall. His son John Henry Thorpe was the Coalition Conservative MP for Manchester Rusholme from 1919 to 1923. His grandson was Jeremy Thorpe, Liberal Party leader.

He died on 7 January 1932.

Church of England titles
| Preceded by John Edward Mercer | Archdeacon of Macclesfield; 1922–1931 | Succeeded by John Hornby Armitstead |
