= Gordon Strutt =

Rupert Gordon Strutt (known as Gordon; 15 January 1912 – 1 October 1985) was the Anglican Bishop of Stockport from 1965 to 1984.

Strutt was educated at the London College of Divinity and Wycliffe Hall, Oxford. Ordained in 1943 he embarked on a curacy at Carlton, Nottinghamshire before wartime service as a Chaplain to the Forces. Livings in Normanton on Soar, Leicester and Addiscombe followed before a spell as Archdeacon of Maidstone and finally appointment to the episcopate in 1965. After 18 years he resigned to begin retirement in Canterbury but died only a year later on 1 October 1985.

Church of England titles
Preceded by Julian Bickersteth	Archdeacon of Maidstone; 1959–1965	Succeeded by Michael Nott
Preceded by David Saunders-Davies	Bishop of Stockport; 1965–1984	Succeeded by Frank Sargeant
