= St Mary's Church, Stockport =

Listed church in Greater Manchester, England

St Mary's Church
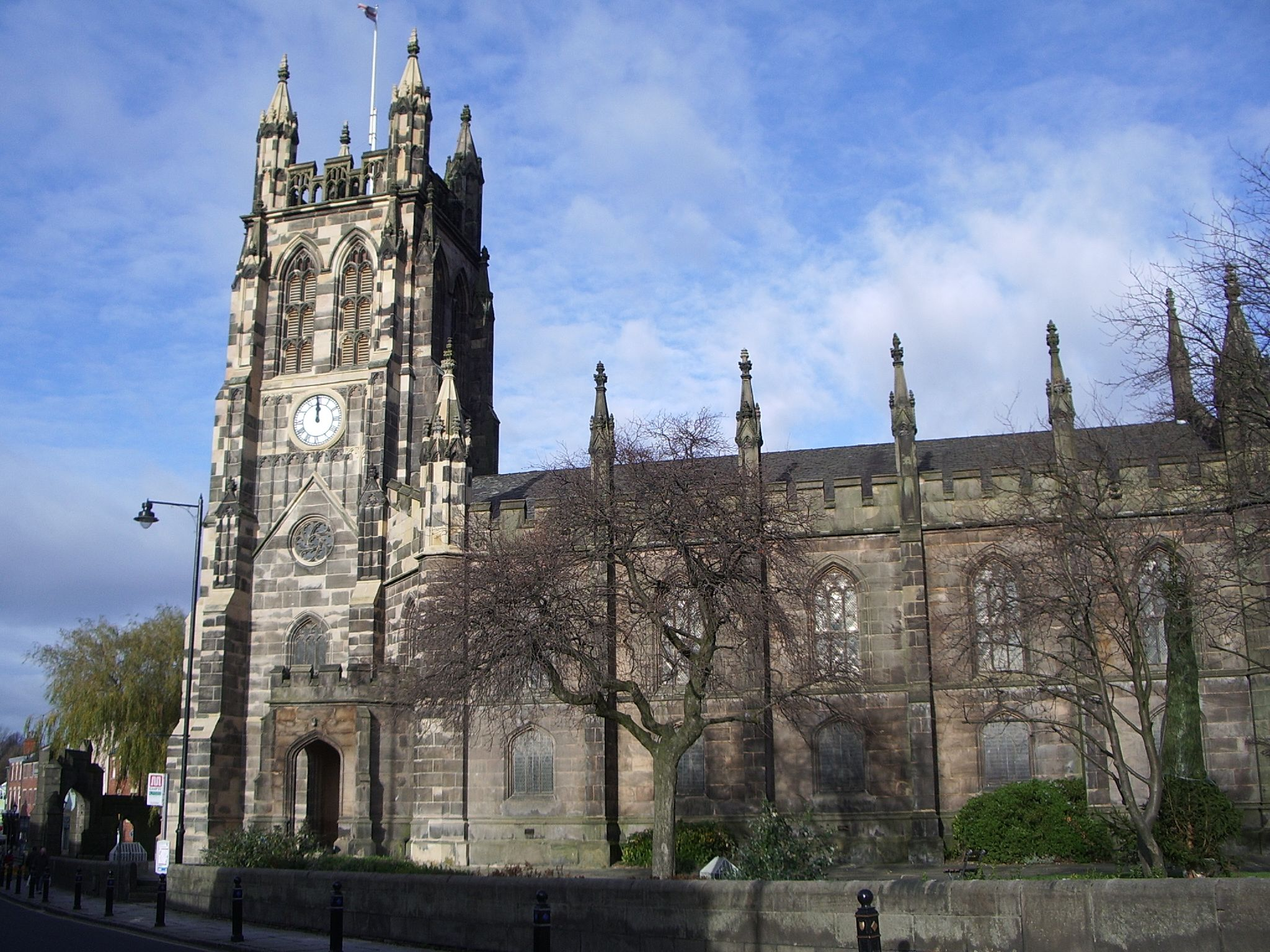
- St Mary's Church, from the south in 2008

- Location in Greater Manchester
- 53.411234°N 2.155514°W
- OS grid reference: SJ 898 905
- Location: Churchgate, Stockport, Greater Manchester
- Country: England
- Denomination: Anglican
- Churchmanship: Central
- Website: stmarysinthemarketplace.com

History
- Status: Parish church

Architecture
- Functional status: Active
- Heritage designation: Grade I
- Designated: 14 May 1952
- Architect: Lewis Wyatt
- Architectural type: Church
- Style: Gothic
- Completed: 1817

Specifications
- Materials: Chancel sandstone Rest of church limestone

Administration
- Province: York
- Diocese: Chester
- Archdeaconry: Macclesfield
- Deanery: Stockport
- Parish: Stockport and Brinnington

Clergy
- Rector: vacant

St Mary's Church is the oldest parish church in Stockport, a town in Greater Manchester, England. It stands on Churchgate overlooking Market Place. The church is recorded in the National Heritage List for England as a Grade I listed building. It is an active Anglican parish church in the Diocese of Chester, the archdeaconry of Macclesfield and the deanery of Stockport.

== History ==
A church stood on the site by 1190. A sandstone church was built during the incumbency of Richard de Vernon (1306–1320), and only its chancel survives. The remainder of the present church was constructed between 1813 and 1817 to the design of Lewis Wyatt. A further restoration took place in 1848 to replace weathered masonry, and additional restoration was carried out in 1882. The tower originated in the 14th century and was rebuilt between 1612 and 1616, and again in 1810.

== Architecture ==
=== Structure ===
The chancel is built in local red sandstone in the decorated style. The rest of the church is Runcorn sandstone in the perpendicular style. Its plan consists of a west tower, a wide nave with galleries, a south porch, and a chancel with a vestry to its north.

=== Fittings and furniture ===
The roof of the chancel is the original single-framed timber roof. In the sanctuary is a double piscina, a large triple sedilia and, in a recess, the damaged effigy of Richard de Vernon, who was rector of Stockport from 1306 to 1334. In the church are several monuments, including one dated 1753 by Daniel Sephton to the memory of William Wright. Other memorials include one to Sir George Warren who died in 1801 by Sir Richard Westmacott depicting a standing female figure by an urn on a pillar, to Rev Charles Prescott who died in 1820, also by Westmacott, showing a seated effigy, to James Antrobus Newton who died in 1823 by Bacon Junior and S. Manning showing a kneeling female figure, and to Mrs Hawall who died in 1852 by Latham of Manchester showing angels hovering over her body. On the chancel arch are the coat of arms of George III in plaster. The parish registers begin in 1584. There is a ring of 10 bells. Seven of these were cast by John Rudhall in 1817 and the other three by John Taylor & Co in 1897.

== External features ==
The gateway to the church and a nearby drinking fountain are listed at Grade II*. The gateway was designed by Lewis Wyatt and consists of three pointed archways, with crocketed finials above the centre arch.

A rectory was built for the church in the 1740s to replace an earlier timber-framed building of 16th-century origin. It served as the home of rectors, and later of the bishops of Stockport, until 1965. The building was converted into a pub-restaurant in 1991, and is a Grade II* listed structure. The old ice house still survives within the grounds.

== Gallery ==
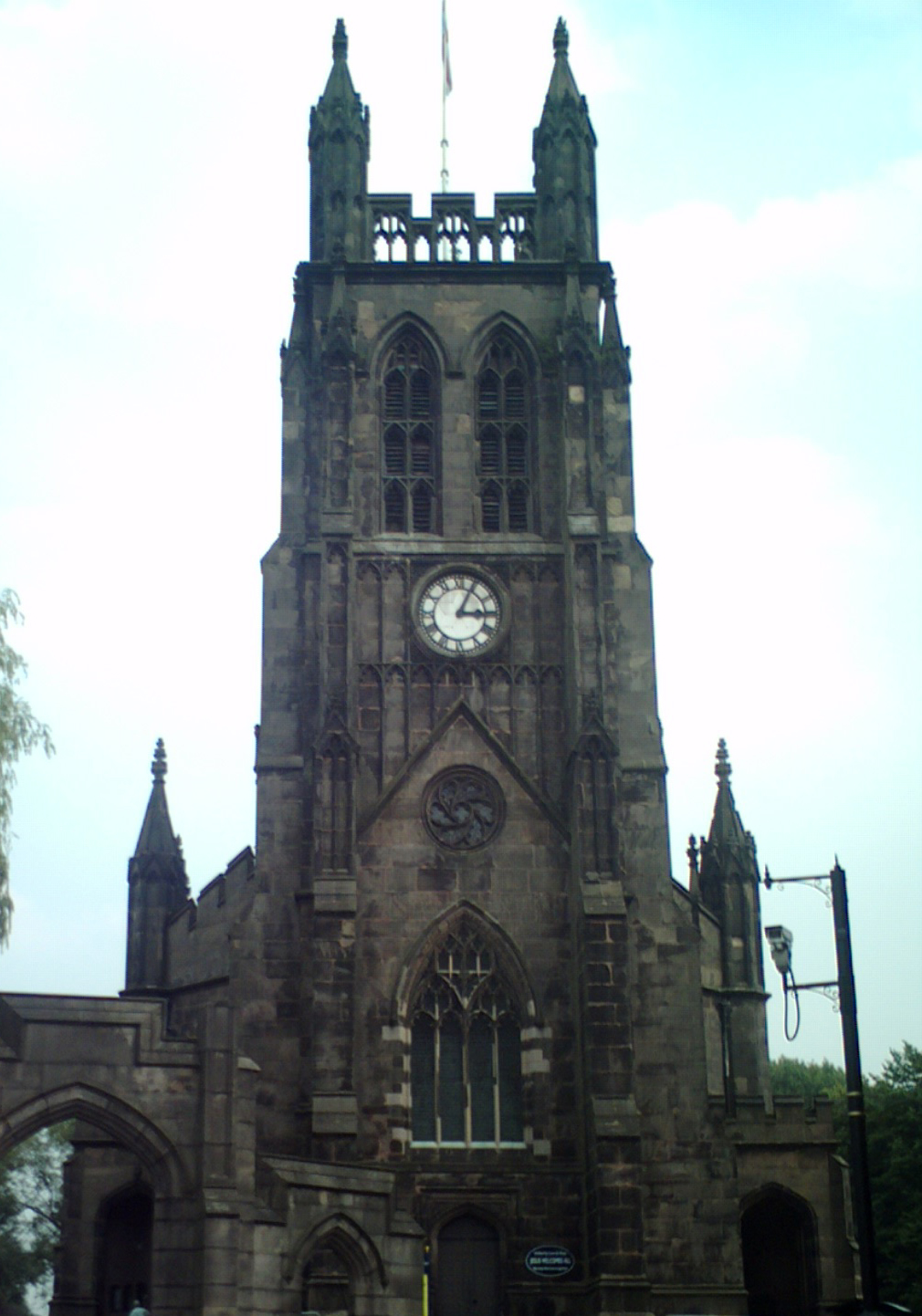
The bell tower of St Mary's Church, 2006

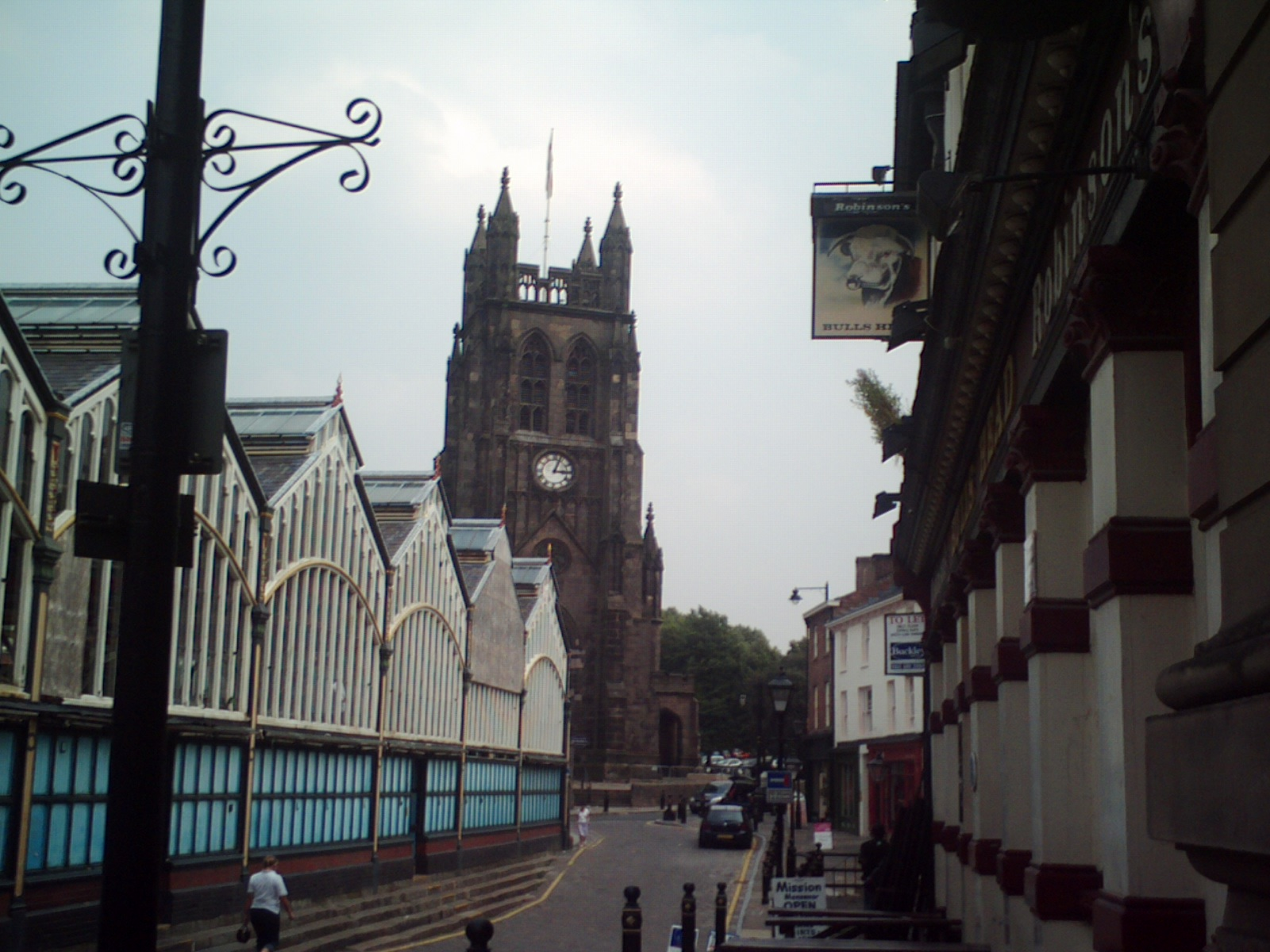
St Mary's Church, with the historic glass market in the foreground on the left, 2006

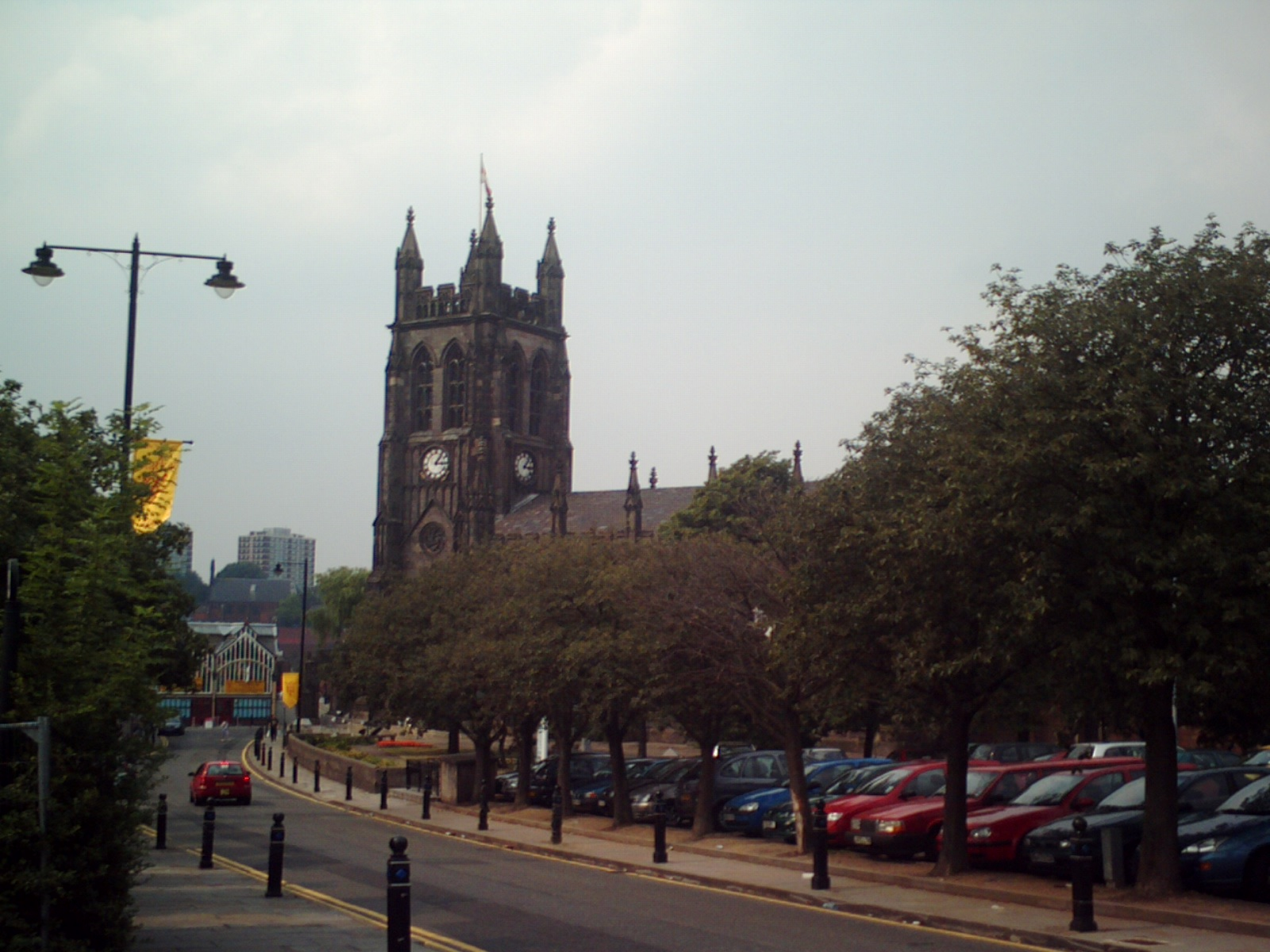
St Mary's Church, 2006

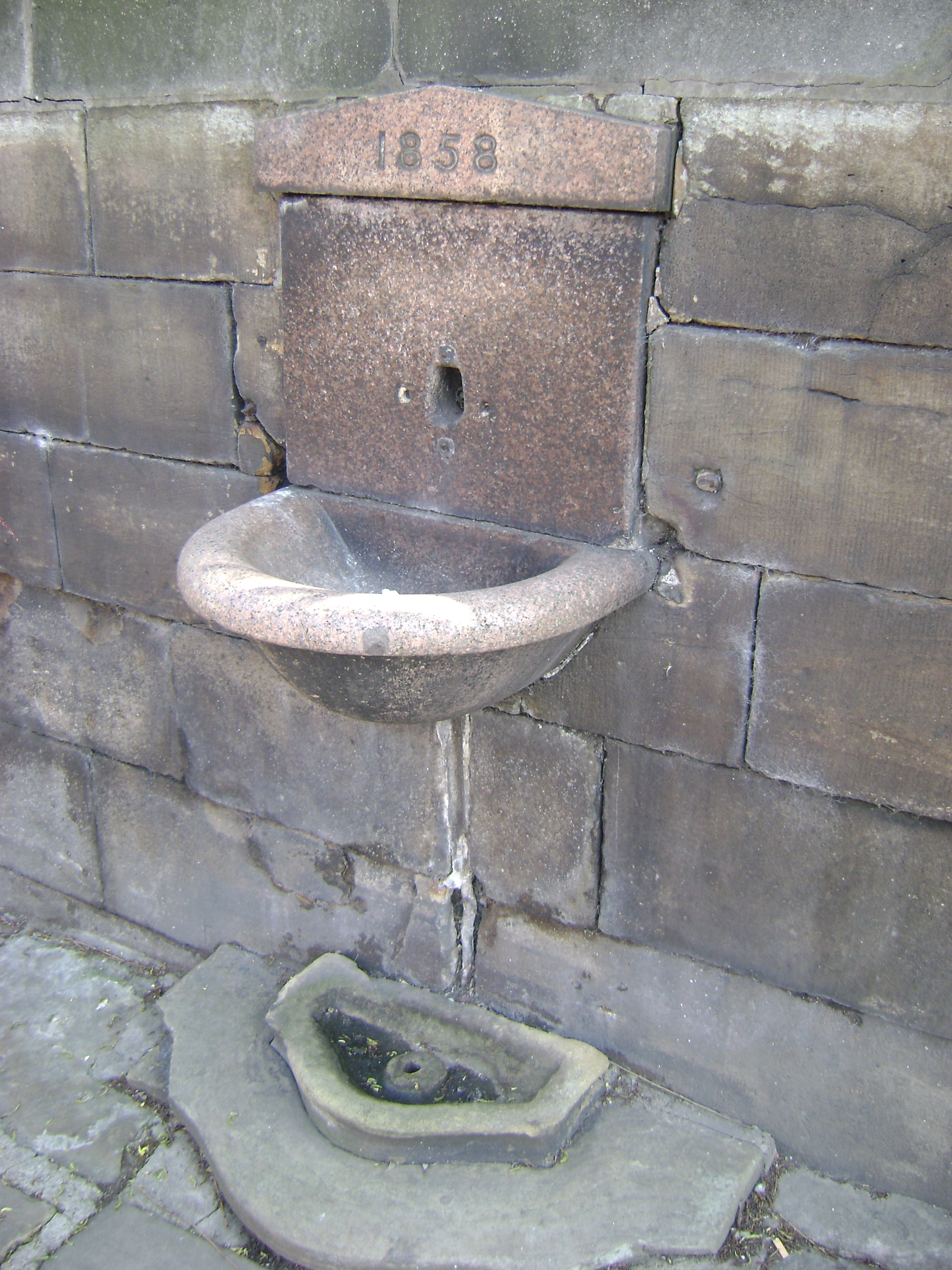
The drinking fountain, 2008

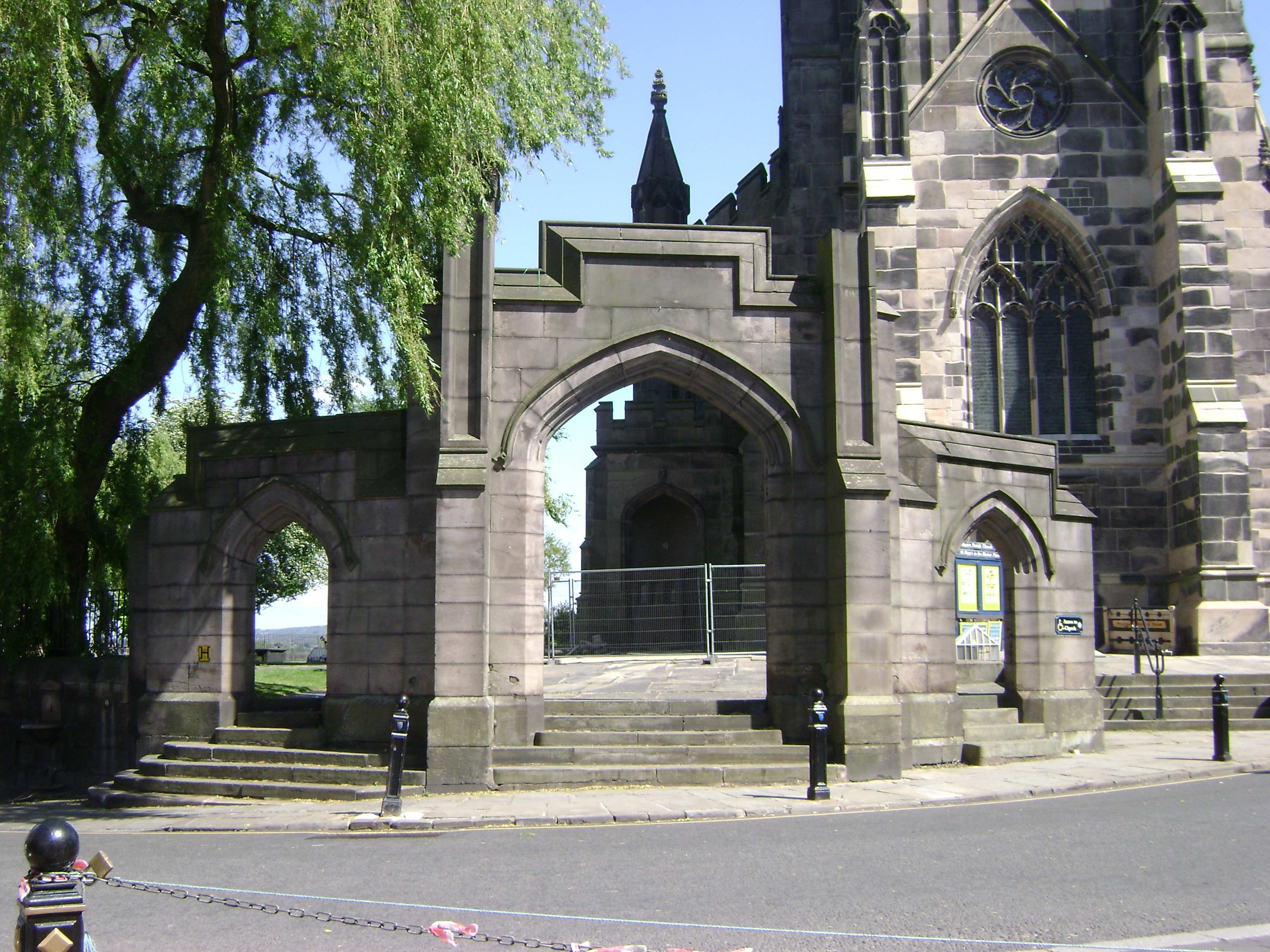
The gate of St Mary's Church, 2009

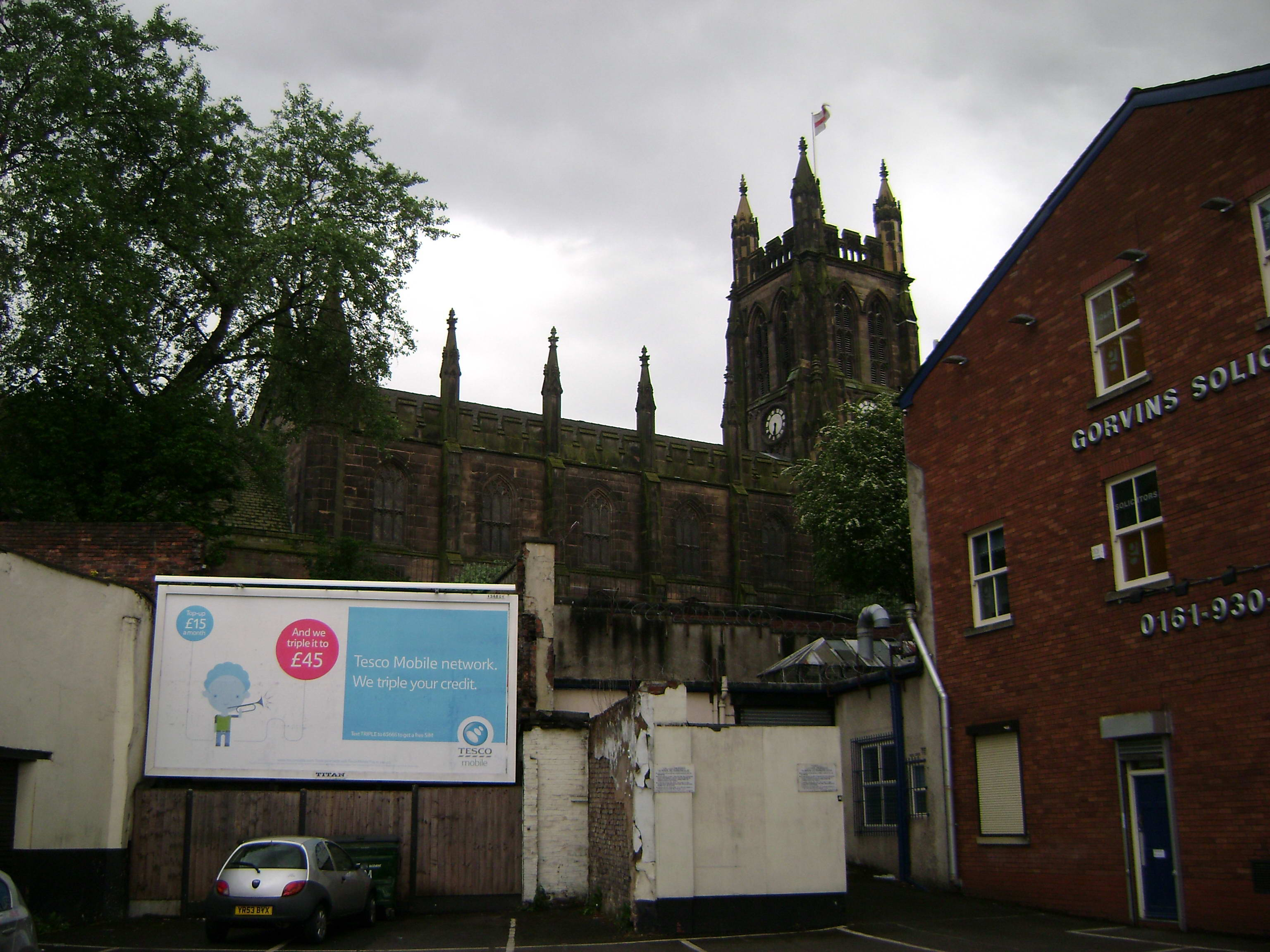
St Mary's Church from Millgate, Stockport, 2009

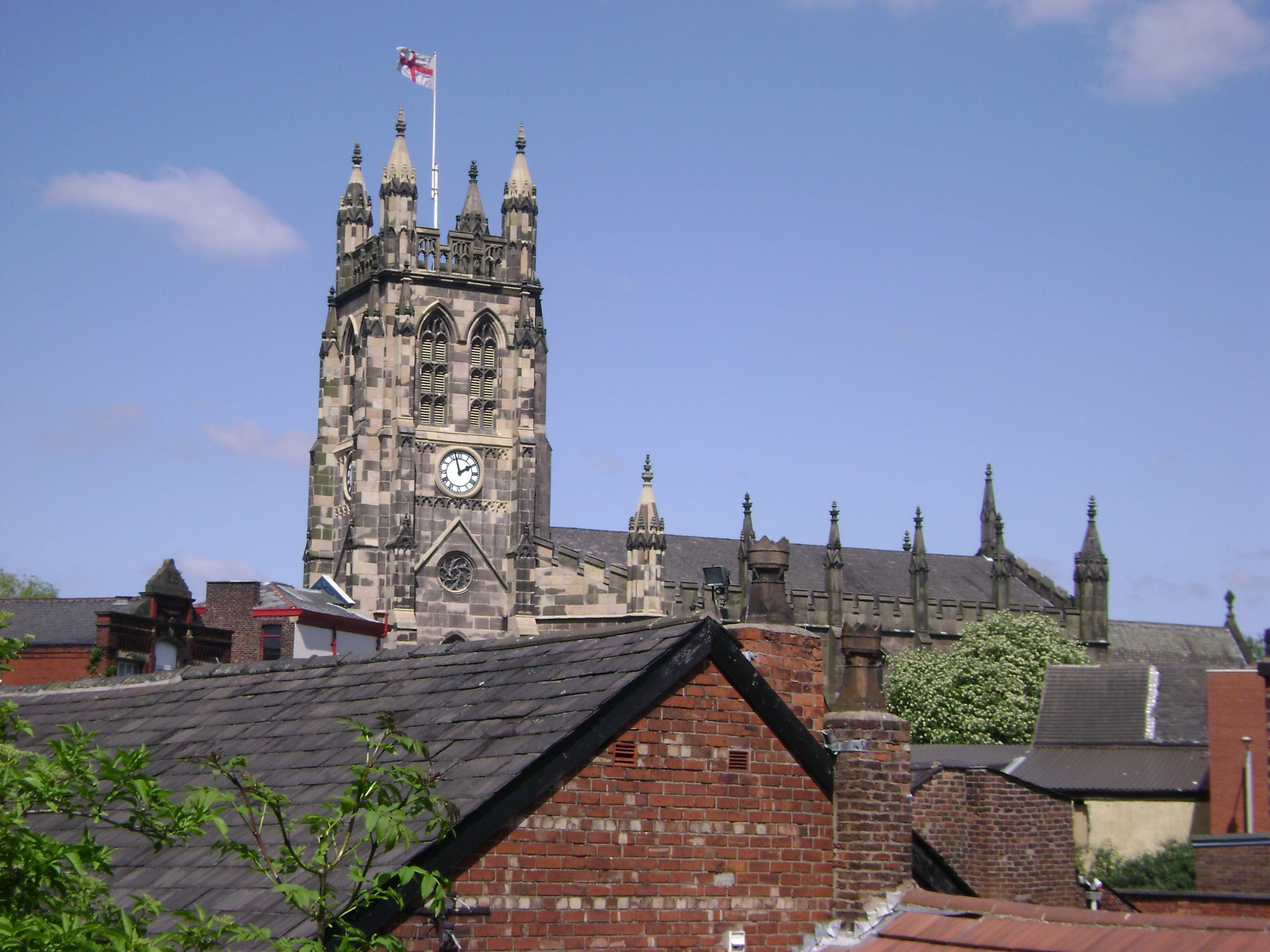
St Mary's Church from High Street, Stockport, 2009

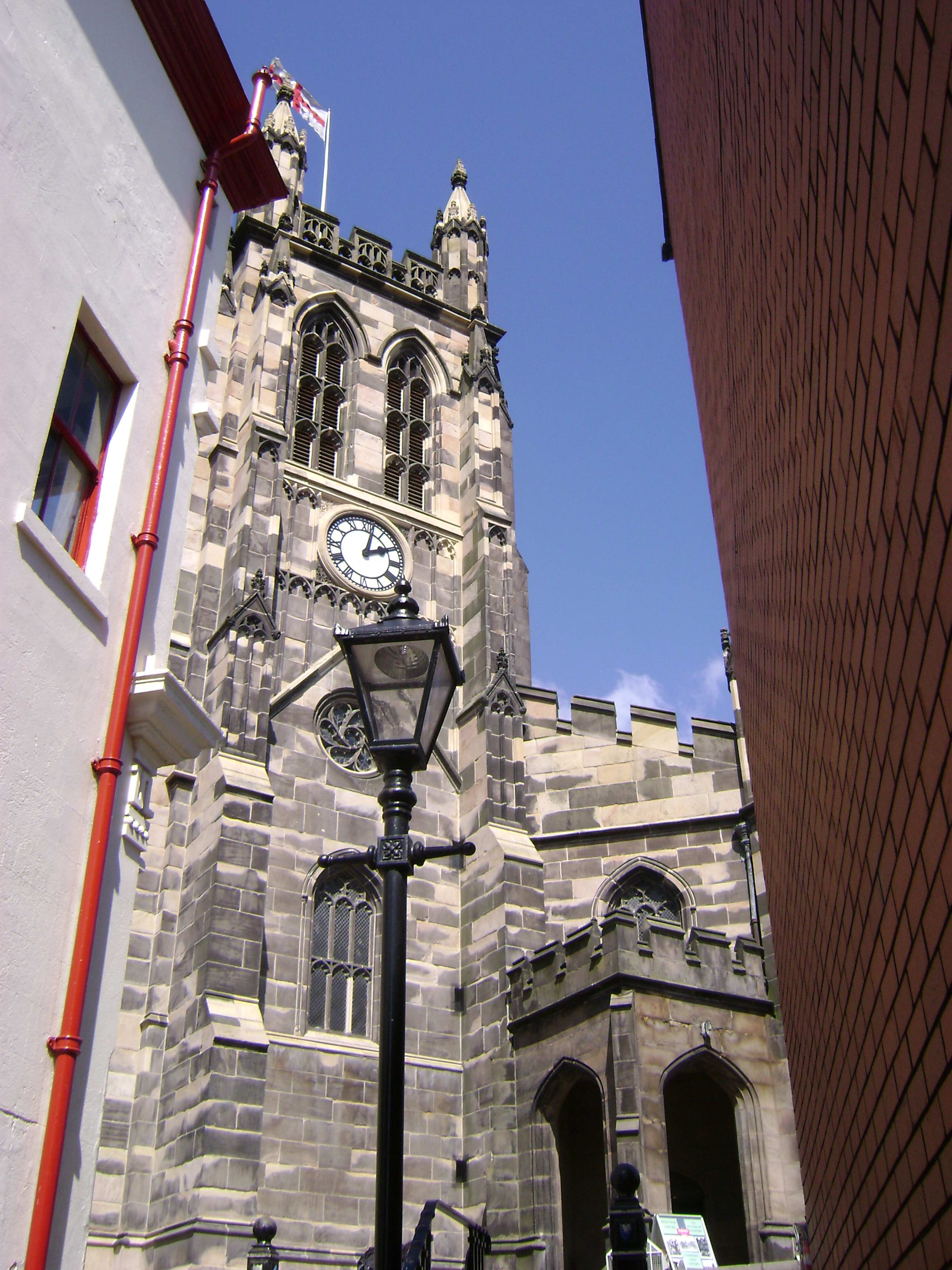
The bell tower of St Mary's Church, 2009

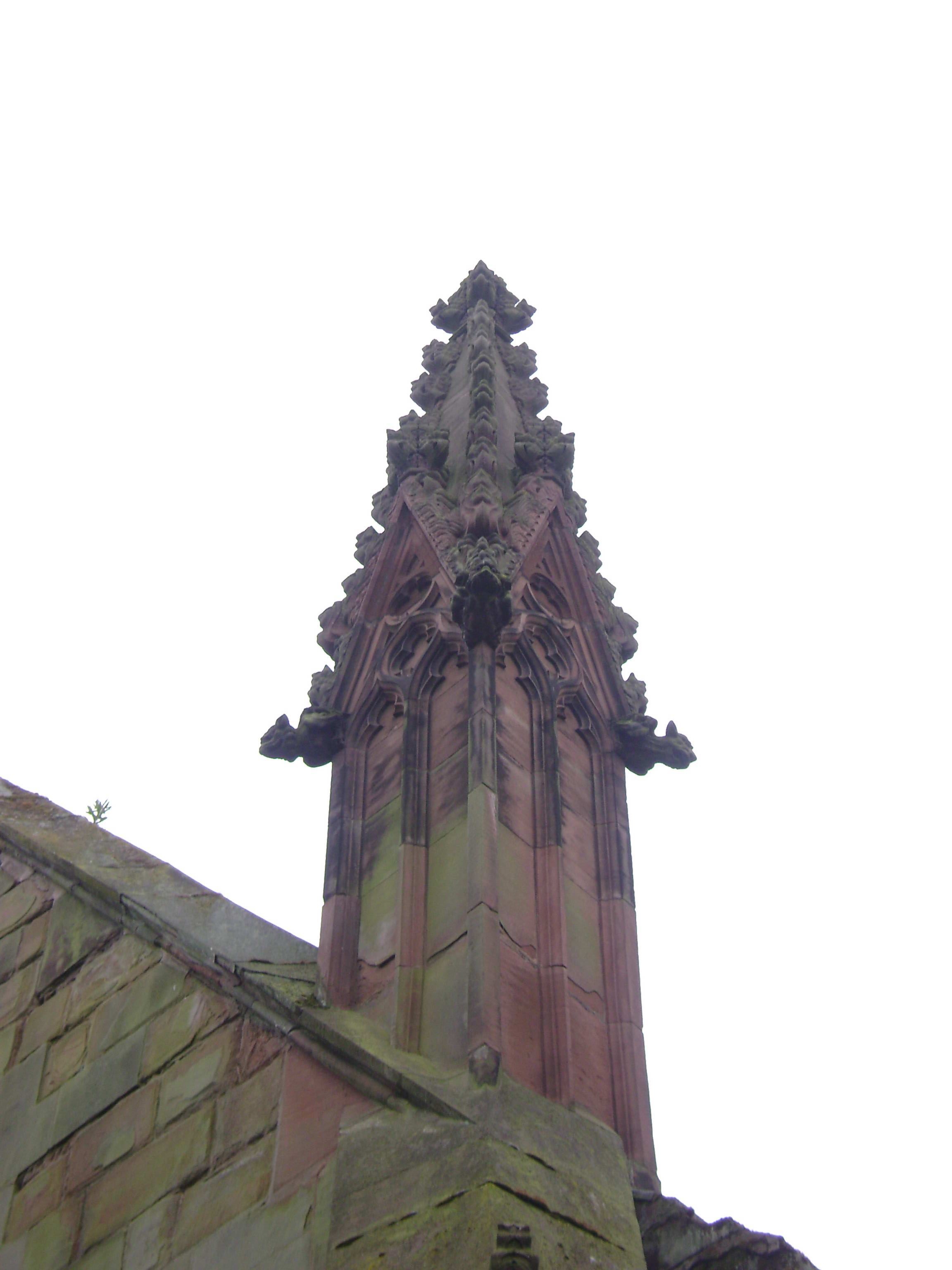
One of the pinnacles of St Mary's Church, 2009

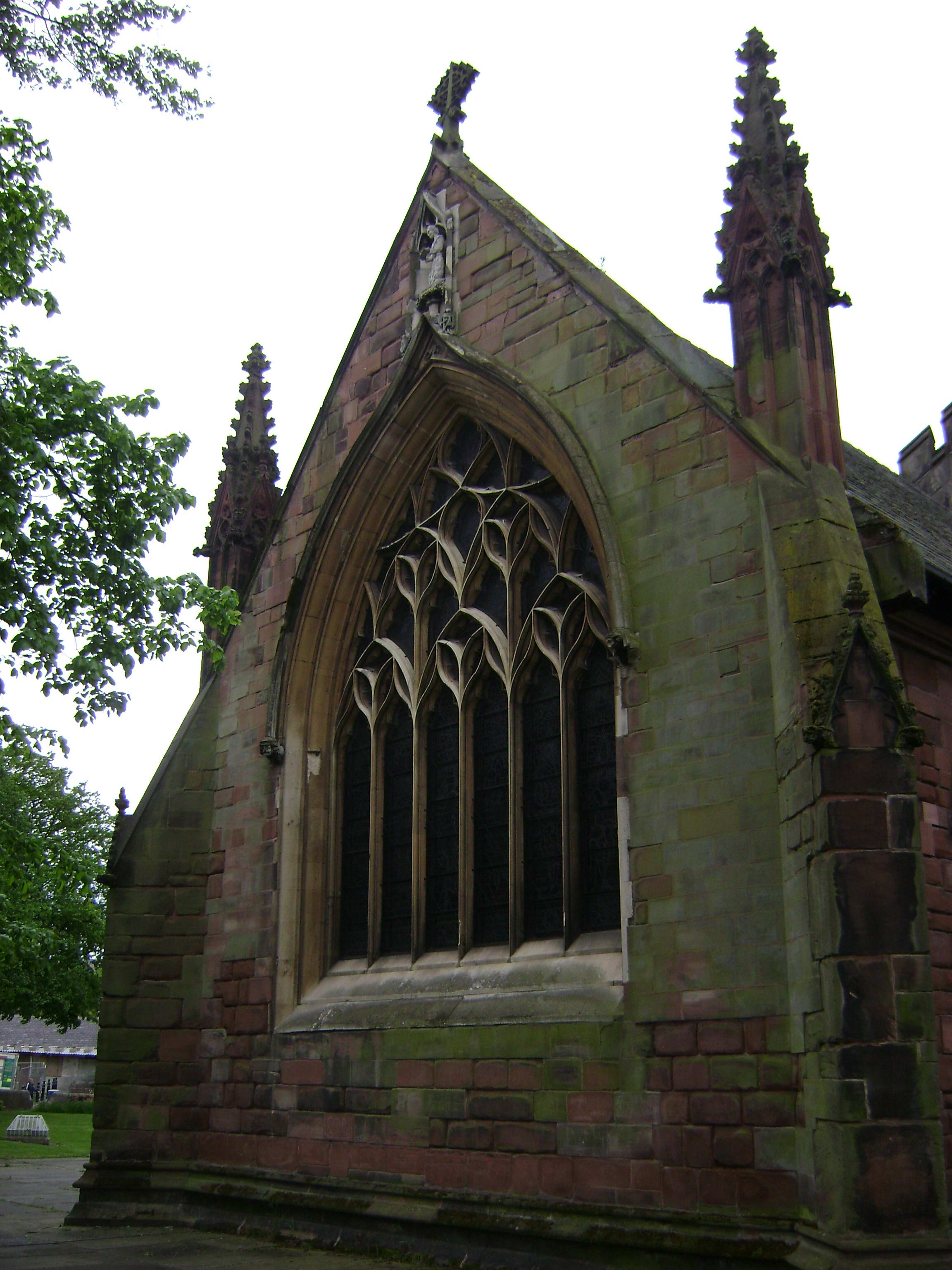
The eastern window of St Mary's Church, 2009

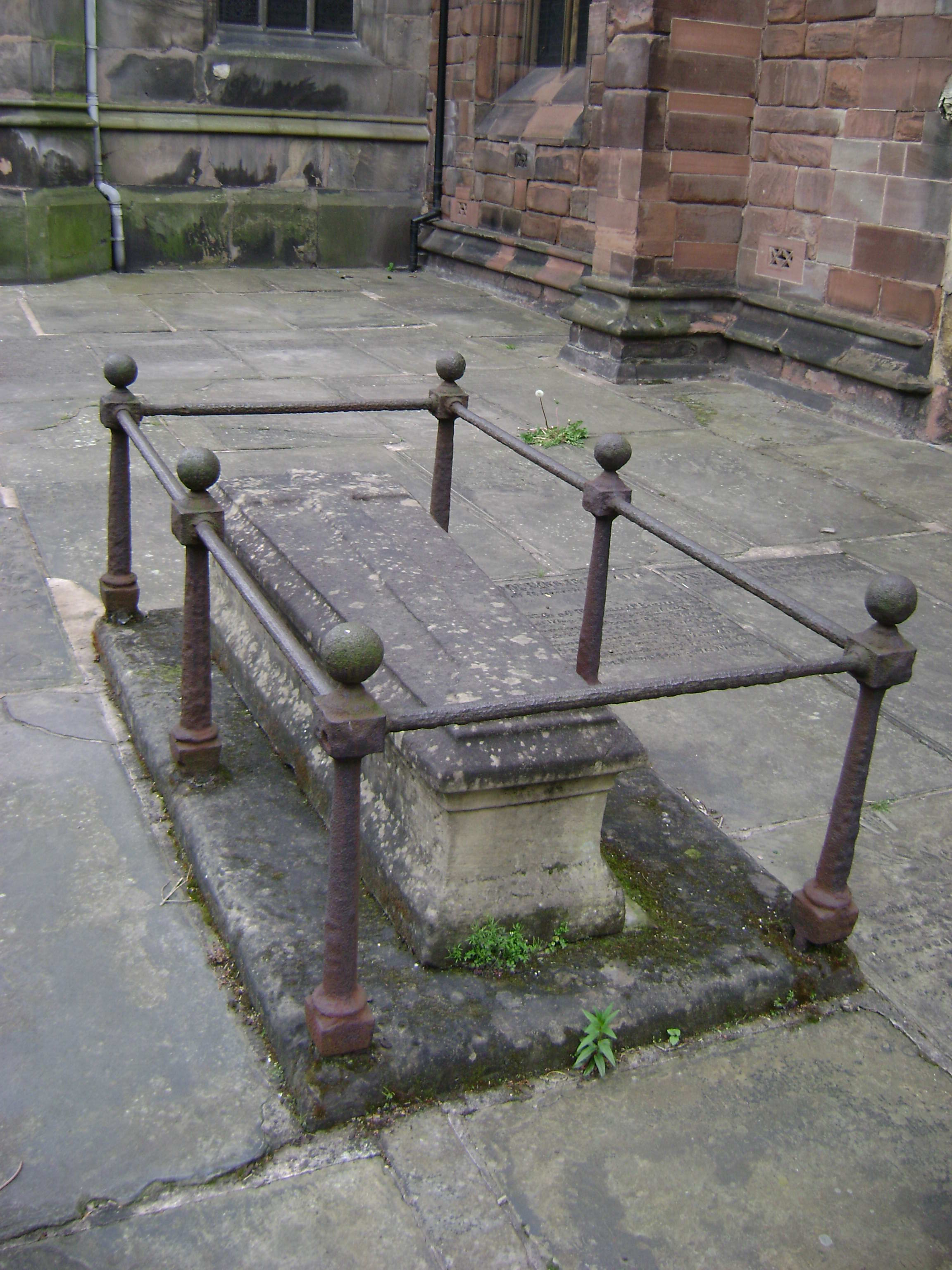
One of the remaining graves around St Mary's Church, 2009

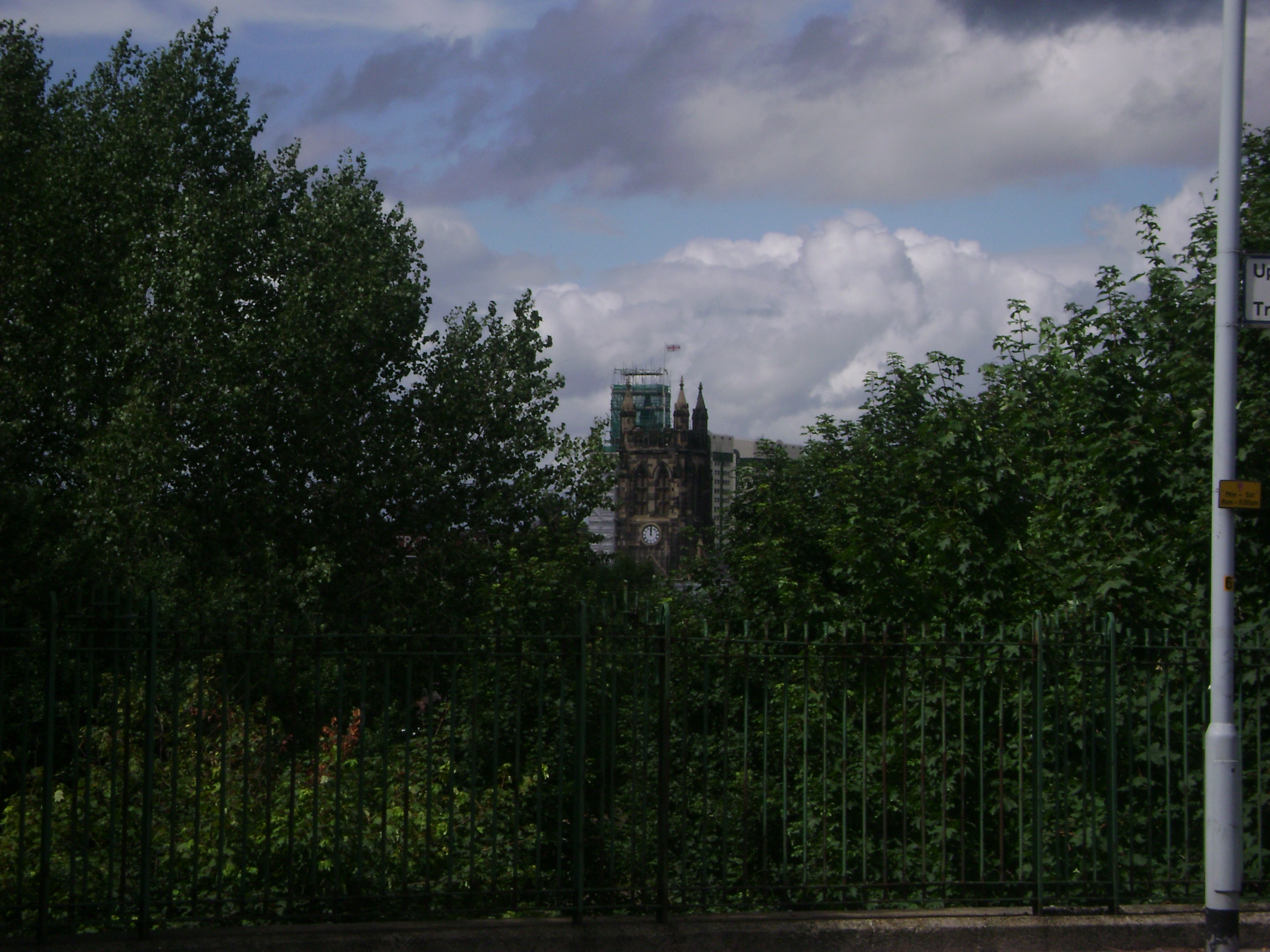
St Mary's Church from Upper Brook Street, Stockport, 2008

== See also ==
- Grade I listed churches in Greater Manchester
- List of churches in Greater Manchester
- Listed buildings in Stockport
