= Francis House =

The Ven. Francis Harry House OBE MA was Archdeacon of Macclesfield from 1967 to 1978.

Born into an ecclesiastical family on 9 August 1908, he was educated at St George's School, Harpenden and Wadham College, Oxford and ordained after a period of study at Ripon College Cuddesdon in 1937. He was successively: Assistant Missioner at the Pembroke College, Cambridge Mission at Walworth; Travelling Secretary of the World's Student Christian Federation at Geneva from 1938 to 1940.; Curate of Leeds Parish Church from 1940 to 1942; Overseas Assistant of the BBC Religious Broadcasting Department in London from 1942 to 1944; representative of World Student Relief in Greece from 1944 to 1946; Secretary of the Youth Department World Council of Churches in Geneva and the World Conference of Christian Youth, Oslo in 1946 and 1947 respectively;Head of Religious Broadcasting at the BBC in London from 1947 to 1955; Associate General Secretary of the World Council of Churches in Geneva from 1955 to 1962; and Vicar of St Giles, Pontefract before his years as an Archdeacon.

He died on 1 September 2004.

== Notes ==
Church of England titles
Preceded by Harry Patrick Saunders	Archdeacon of Macclesfield; 1967–1978	Succeeded by Rennie Simpson
