= Sam Corley =

British bishop (born 1976)

The Right Reverend Sam Corley
- Bishop of Stockport
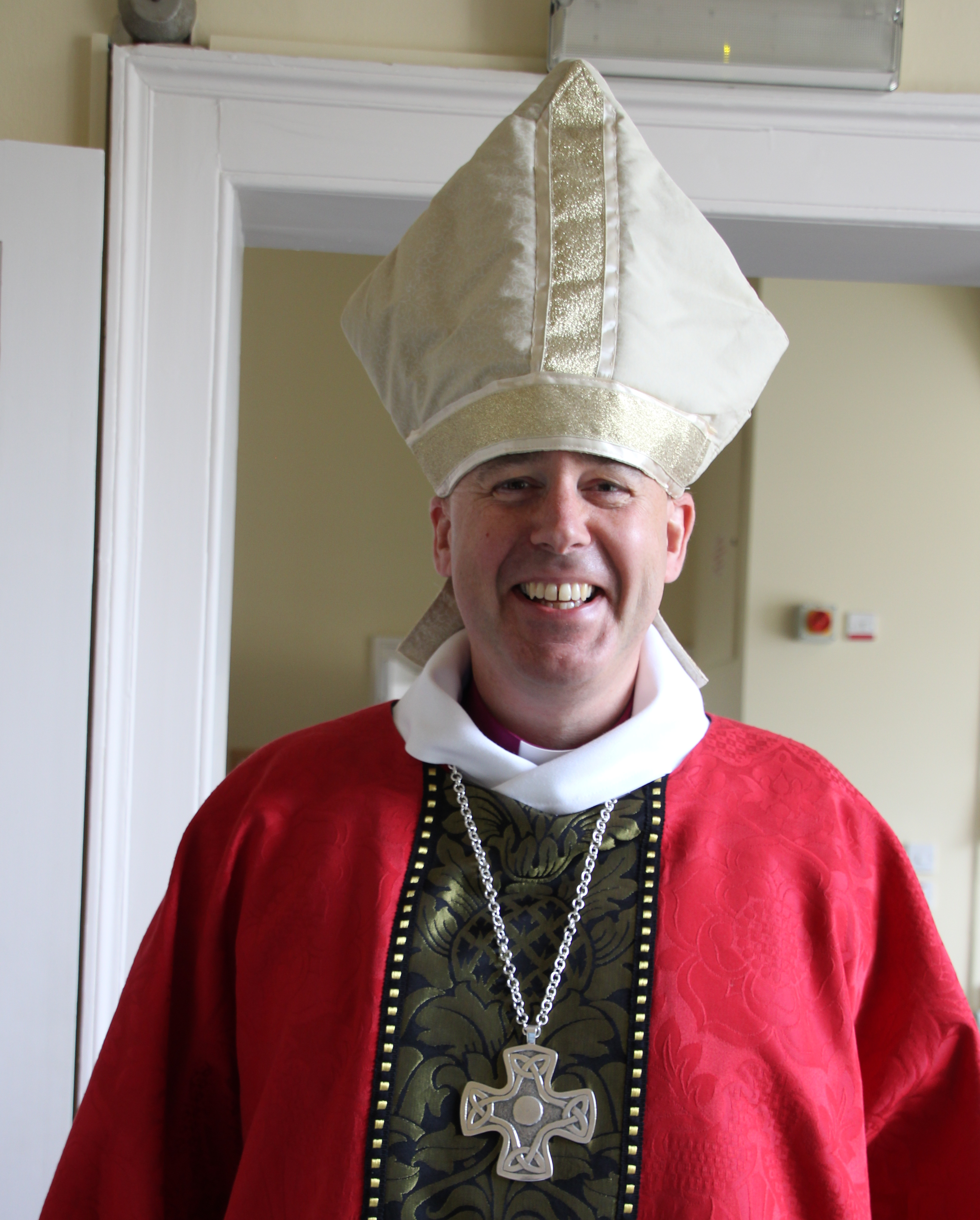
- Bishop Sam Corley in 2022
- Church: Church of England
- Diocese: Diocese of Chester
- In office: July 2021 to present
- Predecessor: Libby Lane

Orders
- Ordination: 2004 (deacon); 2005 (priest)
- Consecration: 19 July 2021 by Stephen Cottrell

Personal details
- Born: Samuel Jon Clint Corley; 1976 (age 49–50)
- Denomination: Anglicanism
- Education: St Aidan's College, Durham; Hughes Hall, Cambridge; St John's College, Nottingham

Samuel Jon Clint Corley (born 1976) is a British Anglican bishop. Since 2021, he has been the Bishop of Stockport, one of two suffragan bishops in the Church of England Diocese of Chester. He previously served as Rector of Leeds Minster (in the Diocese of Leeds) from 2015 to 2021.

== Early life and education ==
Corley was born on 30 June 1976 in Cambridge, Cambridgeshire, England. He was educated at St Bede's Inter-Church Comprehensive School, a joint Anglican-Roman Catholic state school in Cambridge, and at Long Road Sixth Form College, also in Cambridge. He studied theology at St Aidan's College, Durham (BA, MA), and trained as a history teacher at Hughes Hall, Cambridge (PGCE). He then taught history in a school in Sutton, Greater London. He trained for ministry at St John's College, Nottingham (MA).

== Ordained ministry ==
Corley was ordained in the Church of England as a deacon in 2004 and as a priest in 2005. He served his curacy at St Thomas' Church, Lancaster in the Diocese of Blackburn between 2004 and 2008. From 2008 to 2011, he was an assistant diocesan missioner and priest in charge of St John's Church, Ellel. In 2011, he moved to the Diocese of Bradford as a canon precentor of Bradford Cathedral and senior chaplain to the University of Bradford. On 6 October 2015, he was licensed as rector-designate of Leeds Minster in the recently formed Diocese of Leeds.

On 27 May 2021, it was announced that he would be the next Bishop of Stockport in the Diocese of Chester. He legally took up the post on 19 July 2021, the day of his consecration as a bishop by Stephen Cottrell, Archbishop of York, at York Minster; he was consecrated alongside the other new suffragan of the diocese, Julie Conalty, Bishop of Birkenhead.
