= Geoffrey Turner (bishop) =

The Rt Revd Geoffrey Turner
- Bishop of Stockport
- Diocese: Diocese of Chester
- In office: 1994–2000
- Predecessor: Frank Sargeant
- Successor: Nigel Stock
- Other posts: Honorary assistant bishop in Chester (2002–present); Archdeacon of Chester (1993–1994)

Orders
- Ordination: 1963 (deacon); 1964 (priest)
- Consecration: 1994

Personal details
- Born: 16 March 1934 (age 92)
- Denomination: Anglican
- Parents: Ernest and Winifred Martin
- Spouse: Gillian Chope (m. 1959)
- Children: 2 sons; 1 daughter
- Education: Sandhurst

Geoffrey Martin Turner (born 16 March 1934) is a retired bishop of the Church of England. He was the sixth Suffragan Bishop of Stockport.

Turner was educated at Bideford Grammar School, the Royal Military Academy Sandhurst and Oak Hill Theological College. Ordained in 1963, he was a curate in Tonbridge and then Vicar of St Peter's Derby. He was then Rural Dean of Wirral until his ordination to the episcopate in 1994. He resigned in 2000 and in retirement is an honorary assistant bishop in the Diocese of Chester.

Church of England titles
Preceded by Frank Sargeant	Bishop of Stockport; 1994–2000	Succeeded by Nigel Stock
