= Rennie Simpson =

Former Archdeacon of Macclesfield

The Ven. Rennie Simpson, LVO, MA (Lambeth) was Archdeacon of Macclesfield from 1978 to 1985.

Born on 13 January 1920, he was educated at Blackburn Technical College. He was ordained after a period of study at Kelham Theological College in 1946 and began his career with a curacy in South Elmsall. After this he was Succentor at Blackburn Cathedral and then Sacrist at St Paul's Cathedral. He was Vicar of John Keble Church, Mill Hill from 1958 to 1963. He was Precentor at Westminster Abbey from 1963 to 1974 when he became a Canon Residentiary.

An Honorary Chaplain to the Queen, he died on 9 January 1997; and his wife Margaret (née Hardy) on 10 November 2010.

== Notes ==
Church of England titles
Preceded by Francis Harry House	Archdeacon of Macclesfield; 1978–1985	Succeeded by John Scott Gaisford
