= David Saunders-Davies =

British Anglican bishop

David Henry Saunders-Davies (1894 – 12 August 1975) was the second Bishop of Stockport from 1951 until 1965.

Educated at Liverpool College and Queens' College, Cambridge, he held Curacies at St John, Birkenhead and St John, Reading and incumbencies at Hollingworth and Mobberley before wartime service with the RAFVR. When peace returned he was appointed Rural Dean and then Suffragan Bishop of Stockport. He was consecrated a bishop by Cyril Garbett, Archbishop of York, on 2 February 1951 at York Minster. After retiring, he was an Assistant Bishop within the Diocese of Worcester

Church of England titles
Preceded by Frank Okell	Bishop of Stockport; 1951–1965	Succeeded by Gordon Strutt
