= Chadkirk =

Area in Greater Manchester, England

Coordinates: 53.406°N 2.093°W

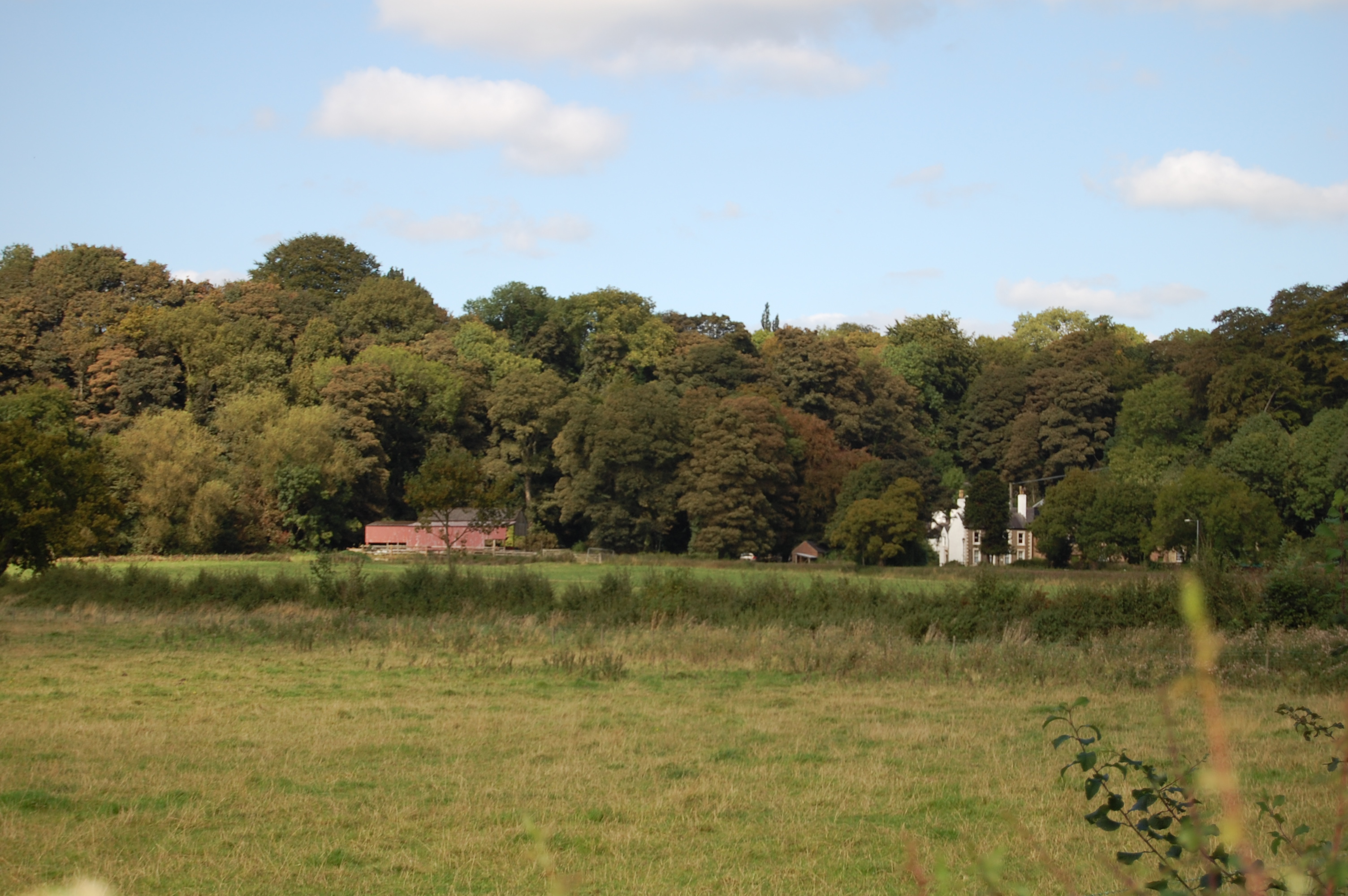
View of Chadkirk Farm

Chadkirk is an area in the Metropolitan Borough of Stockport in Greater Manchester, England. It is located between the River Goyt and the Peak Forest Canal south of Romiley, east of the A627 road. The site of a former print works on the right bank of the River Goyt is now occupied by Chadkirk Business Park.

Chadkirk Country Estate has been designated as a Local Nature Reserve (LNR). Within it, the ancient woodlands of Kirk Wood and Little Wood have been declared Sites of Biological Importance (SBI).

== Notable buildings ==
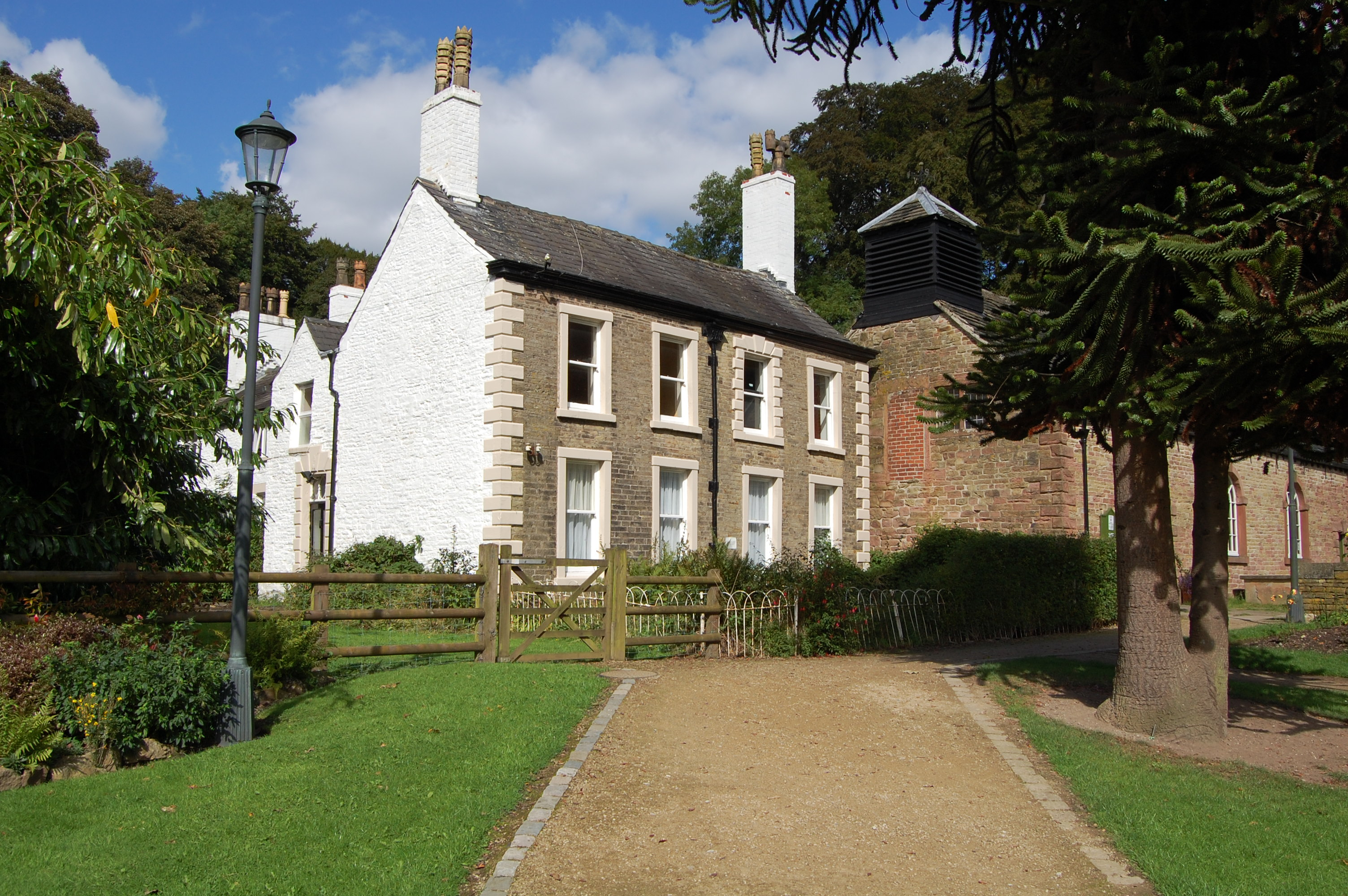
Chadkirk House

Chadkirk Chapel, now redundant, dates back to the 16th century and is probably the successor of an earlier church that was founded in the Middle Ages. Nearby Chadkirk House is a Grade II listed farmhouse that was substantially added to by George Nicholson in 1748.
