= Frank Okell =

Frank Jackson Okell (3 February 1887 – 7 October 1950.) was the inaugural Bishop of Stockport whose 11-month tenure from November 1949, until October 1950, was one of the shortest in the Anglican Communion.

He was educated at Rugby School and Trinity College, Oxford. Ordained in 1914 he was a curate at Bolsterstone before wartime service as a temporary chaplain. Following the Armistice he was a Minor Canon at Sheffield Cathedral then Rector of Bangor Monachorum. A sideways move to Eccleston, Cheshire led to promotion to be Rural Dean of Malpas and finally, before his appointment to the episcopate, Archdeacon of Macclesfield. He was ordained and consecrated a bishop on All Saints' Day (1 November) at York Minster.

Church of England titles
New title	Bishop of Stockport; 1949–1950	Succeeded by David Saunders-Davies
