= Bishop of Stockport =

Suffragan bishop in the Church of England

The Bishop of Stockport is an episcopal title used by a suffragan bishop of the Church of England Diocese of Chester, in the Province of York, England. The title takes its name after the town of Stockport in Greater Manchester.

== List of bishops ==
Bishops of Stockport
From	Until	Incumbent	Notes
1949	1950	Frank Okell	
1951	1965	David Saunders-Davies	
1965	1984	Gordon Strutt	
1984	1994	Frank Sargeant	
1994	2000	Geoffrey Turner	
2000	2007	Nigel Stock	Translated to St Edmundsbury and Ipswich
2008	2014	Robert Atwell	
2015	2019	Libby Lane	First woman consecrated as a bishop in the Church of England
2021	present	Sam Corley	Consecrated 19 July 2021.
