= Diocese of Chester =

Diocese of the Church of England

Coordinates: 53.3312°N 2.6437°W

Diocese of Chester Dioecesis Cestrensis
- Coat of arms

- Flag

Location
- Ecclesiastical province: York
- Archdeaconries: Chester, Macclesfield

Statistics
- Parishes: 275
- Churches: 368

Information
- Cathedral: Chester Cathedral
- Language: English

Current leadership
- Bishop: Mark Tanner, Bishop of Chester
- Suffragans: Julie Conalty, Bishop of Birkenhead; Sam Corley, Bishop of Stockport
- Archdeacons: Michael Gilbertson, Archdeacon of Chester; Jane Proudfoot, Archdeacon of Macclesfield

Website
- chesterdiocese.org

The Diocese of Chester is a Church of England diocese in the Province of York covering the pre-1974 county of Cheshire and therefore including the Wirral and parts of Stockport, Trafford and Tameside.

== History ==
The Diocese of Chester when created in 1541 showing the extent of the two archdeaconries that went to make it up.

The deaneries of the Diocese of Chester in about 1835, shortly before a series of boundary changes greatly diminished its size.

Map showing the areas of the Diocese of Chester which were transferred to other Dioceses in the 19th century, together with the dates on which they were transferred.

=== Ancient diocese ===
Before the sixteenth century the city possessed a bishop and a cathedral, though only intermittently. Even before the Norman Conquest the title "Bishop of Chester" is found in documents applied to prelates who would be more correctly described as Bishop of Mercia, or Bishop of Lichfield. After the Council of London in 1075 had decreed the transfer of all episcopal chairs to cities, Peter, Bishop of Lichfield, removed his seat from Lichfield to Chester, and became known as Bishop of Chester. There he chose The Collegiate Church of St John the Baptist as his cathedral. The next bishop, however, transferred (1102) the see to Coventry on account of the rich monastery there, though he retained the episcopal palace at Chester. The Diocese of Coventry and Lichfield was of enormous extent, and it was probably found convenient to have something analogous to a cathedral at Chester, even though the cathedra itself were elsewhere; accordingly the church of St John ranked as a cathedral for a considerable time, and had its own dean and chapter of secular canons down to the time of the Reformation.

The chief ecclesiastical foundation in Chester was the Benedictine monastery of St Werburgh, the great church of which finally became the Cathedral Church of Christ and the Blessed Virgin Mary. The site had been occupied even during the Christian period of the Roman occupation by a church dedicated to Saints Peter and Paul, and rededicated to St Werburgh and St Oswald during the Saxon period. The church was served by a small chapter of secular canons until 1093, when Hugh Lupus, Earl of Chester, converted it into a major Benedictine monastery, in which foundation he had the co-operation of St Anselm, then Prior of Bec, who sent Richard, one of his monks, to be the first abbot. A new Norman church was built by him and his successors. The monastery, though suffering loss of property both by the depredations of the Welsh and the inroads of the sea, prospered, and in the thirteenth, fourteenth, and fifteenth centuries the monks transformed their Norman church into a gothic building which, though not be reckoned among the greatest cathedrals of England, yet is not unworthy of its rank, and affords a valuable study in the evolution of Gothic architecture. It has been said of it that "at every turn it is satisfying in small particulars and disappointing in great features". The last of the abbots was John, or Thomas, Clark, who resigned his abbey, valued at £1,003 5s. 11d. per annum, to the king.

=== 1541 to 1836 ===
The diocese was created, during the Reformation, on 14 August 1541 from the Chester archdeaconry of the Diocese of Lichfield and Coventry, covering Cheshire and Lancashire, and the Richmond Archdeaconry of the Diocese of York. The diocese was originally formed as part of the Province of Canterbury, but was quickly transferred to the Province of York later in the same year. The twenty deaneries of the new diocese were: Amounderness, Bangor, Blackburn, Boroughbridge, Catterick, Chester, Copeland, Frodsham, Furness, Kendal, Leyland, Lonsdale, Macclesfield, Malpas, Manchester, Middlewich, Nantwich, Richmond, Warrington, and Wirral. The deaneries as shown in the accompanying map, were established by 1224 and remained largely unchanged until the nineteenth century.

=== Since 1836 ===
Starting in 1836, a series of boundary changes saw the diocese eventually greatly diminished in size so that its extent was almost the same as that of the ceremonial county of Cheshire as it existed just prior to 1974. A sequence of five major boundary changes to the diocese began. In 1836, the deaneries of Boroughbridge, Catterick, and Richmond, and half of the deanery of Lonsdale were taken from Chester to form part of the newly created Diocese of Ripon which also had parts taken from the Diocese of York. In 1847, the deaneries of Amounderness, Blackburn, Leyland, and Manchester, together with another large part of the deanery of Lonsdale and roughly one third of the deanery of Kendal were taken to form the then new Diocese of Manchester. Additionally, part of the deanery of Warrington (Leigh) was also transferred to this new Diocese of Manchester. At the same time, the deanery of Bangor was transferred to the Diocese of St Asaph. This left the deaneries of Copeland, Furness, and the remaining parts of the deaneries of Kendal and Lonsdale detached from the main part of the diocese around Chester, provision was made to transfer these to the Diocese of Carlisle, but this required the assent of the then Bishop of Carlisle, or the appointment of a successor. In 1849, the part of the deanery of Chester that extended into Wales was transferred to the Diocese of St Asaph. The detached deaneries in the north of Lancashire and in the Lake District were eventually transferred to the Diocese of Carlisle in 1856, on the appointment of Henry Montagu Villiers to the See. Finally, in 1880, the remaining part of the deanery of Warrington was used to create the new Diocese of Liverpool. At that point, the Diocese of Chester had been reduced to its present size.

== Present day ==
The Bishop of Chester is assisted by two suffragan bishops, the Bishop of Stockport and the Bishop of Birkenhead. The suffragan See of Stockport was created in 1949 and was the sole suffragan bishopric in the diocese until the See of Birkenhead was created in 1965. Since 1994 the Bishop of Beverley (currently Glyn Webster, consecrated in 2013) has provided "alternative episcopal oversight" in this diocese (among eleven others in the Province of York) to those parishes which cannot in conscience accept the sacramental ministry of bishops who have participated in the ordination of women.

There are two archdeaconries, Chester and Macclesfield, which are further divided into 18 deaneries. There are consequently two archdeacons: the Archdeacon of Chester, Michael Gilbertson, and the Archdeacon of Macclesfield, Jane Proudfoot. There is also the Dean of Chester, currently Tim Stratford, who is primarily responsible for the running of the cathedral.

Deanery	Archdeaconry	Parish Churches	Notes and References
Birkenhead	Chester	St Oswald, Bidston; Christ Church, Birkenhead; Christ the King, Birkenhead; Priory Chapel, Birkenhead; St Bede, Birkenhead; St James, Birkenhead; St Andrew, Noctorum; St Saviour, Oxton; St Stephen, Prenton; St Peter, Rock Ferry; St Catherine, Tranmere; St Paul with St Luke, Tranmere; Holy Cross, Woodchurch	
Bowdon	Macclesfield	St George, Altrincham; St Elizabeth, Ashley; St Martin, Ashton upon Mersey; St Mary Magdalene, Ashton upon Mersey; St Luke, Bowdon; St Mary the Virgin, Bowdon; St Alban, Broadheath; All Saints, Dunham Massey; St Margaret, Dunham Massey; St Mark, Dunham Massey; St Peter, Hale; All Saints, Hale Barns with Ringway; St Peter, Oughtrington; St Mary, Partington; St Anne, Sale; St Paul, Sale; Sale West Community Church; Christ Church, Timperley; Holy Cross, Timperley; St Werburgh, Warburton	
Chadkirk	Macclesfield	St Barnabas, Bredbury; St Mark, Bredbury; St Mary the Virgin, Disley; St John, Furness Vale; St Thomas, High Lane; St Martin, Low Marple; All Saints, Marple; St Thomas, Mellor; St Thomas, Norbury; St Chad, Romiley; St Paul, Strines; St James, Taxal; St Paul, Werneth; Holy Trinity, Whaley Bridge	Chadkirk deanery was originally part of Stockport deanery at least as late as 1974.
Cheadle	Macclesfield	St Michael & All Angels, Bramhall; All Hallows, Cheadle; St Cuthbert, Cheadle; St Mary, Cheadle; St Philip's Mission Church, Cheadle; All Saints, Cheadle Hulme; St Andrew, Cheadle Hulme; Emmanuel, Cheadle Hulme; Christ Church, Colshaw; St James, Gatley; St Chad, Handforth; St Catherine, Heald Green; St Martin, Higher Poynton; St George, Poynton	Cheadle deanery was originally part of Stockport deanery at least as late as 1974.
Chester	Chester	Ashton Hayes, Barrow, Chester St Peter with St John, Chester St Oswald and St Thomas of Canterbury, Chester Holy Trinity Without-the-Walls (Blacon), Chester St Mary Without-the-Walls (Handbridge), Chester St Paul, Christleton, Dodleston, Eccleston and Pulford, Guilden Sutton, Hoole, Huntington, Kelsall, Lache cum Saltney, Plemstall, Tarvin, Upton-by-Chester, Plas Newton, Chester Christ Church	Chester College Chaplaincy (now University of Chester Chaplaincy) is also in this deanery.
Congleton	Macclesfield	Alsager St Mary Magdalene, Alsager Christ Church, Holy Trinity, Congleton, Astbury, Barthomley, Brereton, Church Hulme (or Holmes Chapel), St James, Congleton, St Peter's, Congleton, St John's, Congleton, Eaton with Hulme Walfield, Elworth, Goostrey, Lawton (or Church Lawton), Marton, Odd Rode, Sandbach, Sandbach Heath, Smallwood, Siddington with Capesthorne, Warmingham, Wheelock, Swettenham	
Frodsham	Chester	Alvanley and Manley, Dunham-on-the-Hill, Frodsham, Grange, Hallwood, Halton, Helsby, Kingsley, Norley, Norton, Runcorn All Saints, Runcorn Holy Trinity, Runcorn Weston St John, Runcorn St Michael and All Angels, St Berteline's, Thornton-le-Moors with Ince & Elton, Crowton	
Great Budworth	Chester	Antrobus, Appleton Thorn, Aston by Sutton, Barnton, Daresbury, Grappenhall, Great Budworth, Latchford Christ Church, Latchford St James, Little Leigh, Lower (or Nether) Whitley, Lymm, Stockton Heath, Stretton, Thelwall, Walton	
Knutsford	Macclesfield	Alderley, Birtles, Chelford, Alderley Edge, High Legh, Knutsford St Cross, Knutsford St John the Baptist, Lindow, Lower Peover, Marthall, Mobberley, Over Peover, Over Tabley, Rostherne with Bollington, Toft, Wilmslow, Woodford	
Macclesfield	Macclesfield	Bollington, Bosley, Gawsworth, Henbury, Hurdsfield, Macclesfield Team (All Saints, St Barnabas, St Michael's, St Peter's), Macclesfield St John, Macclesfield St Paul, North Rode, Pott Shrigley, Prestbury, Rainow with Saltersford and Forest, Sutton St James, Upton Priory, Wildboarclough, Wincle	
Malpas	Chester	Aldford, Bickerton, Bickley, Bruera, Bunbury, Burwardsley, Coddington, Farndon, Handley, Hargrave, Harthill, Malpas and Threapwood, Marbury, Shocklach, Tarporley, Tattenhall, Tilstone Fearnall, Tilston, Tushingham, Waverton, Whitewell	
Middlewich	Chester	Byley-cum-Lees, Davenham, Delamere, Hartford, Little Budworth, Lostock Gralam, Middlewich, Moulton, Northwich (Castle) Holy Trinity, Northwich (Winnington) St Luke, Over St Chad, Over St John, Sandiway, Weaverham, Wharton, Whitegate, Witton (Northwich), Christ Church, Wharton	
Mottram	Macclesfield	Dukinfield St John, Dukinfield St Luke, Dukinfield St Mark, Gee Cross, Godley cum Newton Green, Hattersley, Hollingworth, Hyde St George, Hyde St Thomas, Micklehurst, Millbrook, Mottram-in-Longendale, Newton with Flowery Field, Stalybridge Holy Trinity & Christchurch, Stalybridge St Paul, Tintwistle	
Nantwich	Macclesfield	Acton, Audlem, Baddiley, Burleydam, Church Minshull, Coppenhall, Crewe All Saints and St Paul, Crewe St Andrew with St John the Baptist, Crewe St Barnabas, Crewe Christ Church, Crewe St Peter, Crewe Green, Doddington, Haslington, Leighton-cum-Minshull Vernon, Nantwich, Weston, Wettenhall, Wistaston, Worleston, Wrenbury, Wybunbury	
Stockport	Macclesfield	Brinnington with Portwood, Offerton, Cheadle Heath and Edgeley, Stockport St Mary, Stockport St Peter, Stockport St Saviour, Stockport St Thomas, St George's Church, Heaviley	Stockport deanery originally included Chadkirk and Cheadle deaneries at least as late as 1974.
Wallasey	Chester	Leasowe, The Parish of the Resurrection, Liscard St Thomas, New Brighton St James with Emmanuel, New Brighton All Saints, Poulton, Seacombe, Wallasey St Hilary, Wallasey St Nicholas, Moreton	
Wirral North	Chester	Barnston, Bebington St Andrew, Bebington Townfield Church, Frankby with Greasby, Great Meols, Heswall, Higher Bebington, Hoylake, New Ferry, Newton West Kirby, Thurstaston, Upton (Overchurch), West Kirby St Andrew, West Kirby St Bridget, Poulton Lancelyn	
Wirral South	Chester	Backford, Bromborough, Burton, Capenhurst, Eastham, Ellesmere Port Team, Great Saughall, Great Sutton, Hooton, Neston, Neston Parkgate, Shotwick, Thornton Hough, Willaston	

== Bishops ==
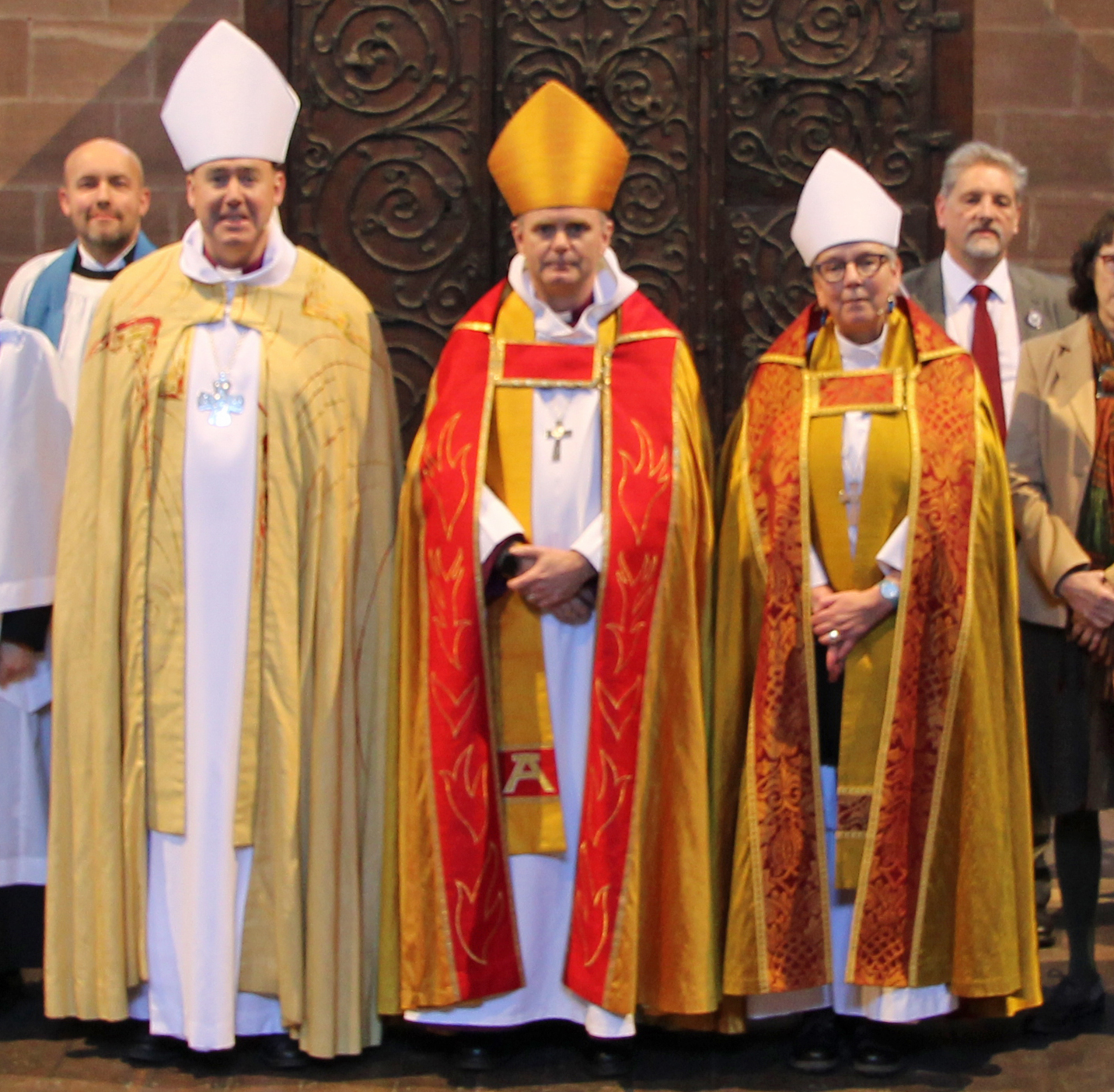
Bishops of the diocese in 2022 (L to R: Corley, Tanner, Conalty)

The diocesan Bishop of Chester Mark Tanner is supported by two suffragan bishops: the Bishop suffragan of Birkenhead (Julie Conalty) and the Bishop suffragan of Stockport (Sam Corley). Alternative episcopal oversight (AEO) for parishes in the diocese which do not accept ordination of women as priests or bishops is provided by the Bishop suffragan of Beverley (currently Stephen Race), while AEO for conservative evangelical parishes is provided by the Bishop suffragan of Ebbsfleet (currently Rob Munro). Besides the PEVs, there are five retired honorary assistant bishops licensed in the diocese:

- 1997–present: Willie Pwaisiho, a former Bishop of Malaita, is now Rector of Gawsworth.
- 2000–present: Colin Bazley, retired Bishop of Chile, lives in Higher Bebington
- 2002–present: Geoffrey Turner is a former Bishop suffragan of Stockport who lives in West Kirby
- 2008–present: John Hayden was an assistant bishop for Kiteto in the Diocese of Mount Kilimanjaro; he now lives in Hoylake
- 2009–present: Graham Dow, a retired Bishop of Carlisle, lives in Romiley and is also licensed as an honorary assistant bishop in the neighbouring Diocese of Manchester

== See also ==
- Bishoprics of Chester and Man Act 1541
