= Listed buildings in Macclesfield Forest and Wildboarclough =

Macclesfield Forest and Wildboarclough is a civil parish in Cheshire East, England. It contains 28 buildings that are recorded in the National Heritage List for England as designated listed buildings. Of these, two are listed at Grade II*, the middle grade, and the others are at Grade II. Population in the parish is scattered, and most of the parish is farmland, moorland and forest. There are two small settlements at Wildboarclough and Allgreave, otherwise dwellings are scattered. The major house in the parish is Crag Hall; this and buildings associated with it are listed. Other listed buildings include farmhouses, farm buildings, churches, a terrace of houses, a bridge, a former post office with a telephone kiosk outside it, milestones, mileposts and parish boundary stones.

== Key ==
Grade	Criteria
II*	Particularly important buildings of more than special interest
II	Buildings of national importance and special interest

== Buildings ==
Name and location	Photograph	Date	Notes	Grade
Midgeley Gate Farmhouse; 53.19448°N 2.00886°W	—	Early 17th century	The farmhouse is built in gritstone and consists of north and south wings and a cross-wing. It is in two and three storeys. Some of the windows are mullioned, and others are casements.	II*
Forest Chapel; 53.24628°N 2.03986°W		1673	The chapel was almost completely rebuilt in 1834. It is constructed in sandstone with a Kerridge stone-slate roof. The chapel consists of a nave and chapel in one range, a south porch, and a west tower with a saddleback roof.	II
Farm building, Midgeley Gate Farm; 53.19429°N 2.00890°W	—	Late 17th century	This originated as a dwelling, or as a farm building with accommodation above, and has later been used as a cartshed and a stable. It is built in gritstone and has a slate roof. The building contains mullioned windows, some of which are blocked.	II
Bank Top Cottage; 53.22000°N 2.02711°W	—	1690	A cross-wing was added to the cottage probably in the later 18th century. It is built in gritstone with Kerridge stone-slate roofs, and has two storeys. There is a blocked mullioned window, the other windows being casements. Inside the cottage is an inglenook.	II
Eagle and Child; 53.19428°N 2.01539°W	—	1738	Originating as a public house, this has been converted into a dwelling. It is built in sandstone with Kerridge stone-slate roofs. The house is in two storeys, and has casement windows. It incorporates an incised sign depicting an eagle with a child, the date, and initials.	II
Milestone; 53.24712°N 2.00287°W	—	c. 1750	The sandstone milestone is on the old turnpike road from Macclesfield to Buxton. It has a triangular section and a shaped top, and is inscribed with the distances in miles to Macclesfield and London.	II
Milestone; 53.25997°N 2.06014°W	—	c. 1750	The sandstone milestone is on the old turnpike road from Macclesfield to Buxton. It has a triangular section and a shaped top. The west face is inscribed with "Miles to" and "London", and the east face with "To", the rest being lost.	II
Milestone; 53.25028°N 2.02326°W	—	c. 1750	The sandstone milestone is on the old turnpike road from Macclesfield to Buxton. It has a triangular section and a shaped top, and is inscribed with the distances in miles to Macclesfield and London.	II
Three Shire Heads Bridge; 53.21389°N 1.98753°W		Late 18th century (probable)	The bridge crosses the River Dane at the junction of Cheshire, Derbyshire, and Staffordshire. It is a humpback bridge built in gritstone, and consists of a deep segmental arch with voussoirs. Originally cobbled and 4 feet (1.2 m) wide, it has since been widened to 6 feet (1.8 m) and given a concrete roadway.	II
Crag Hall; 53.21630°N 2.01961°W		1815	The house was later extended at each end with addition of bow windows. It is built in sandstone with slate roofs. The house is in two storeys, and has a front of five bays plus the bow windows. In the centre is a portico with four unfluted Ionic columns which is approached by steps. The windows are sashes.	II*
Southeast gate piers and wing walls, Crag Hall; 53.21588°N 2.01860°W	—	c. 1820	The stone gate piers are monoliths, and have pyramidal tops. The adjoining wing walls curve round to end piers surmounted by square urn finials.	II
Southwest gate piers and wing walls, Crag Hall; 53.21565°N 2.02007°W		c. 1820	The stone gate piers are monoliths, and have pyramidal tops. The adjoining wing walls curve round to their ends. The gates, which date from the 19th century, are in timber and incorporate an openwork cast iron band.	II
Wall and Summerhouse, Crag Hall; 53.21686°N 2.02023°W	—	c. 1820	The wall is built in sandstone and is 12 feet (3.7 m) high. The summerhouse is in the corner of the garden, and has an end wall in the form of a semi-octagon.	II
Wall to garden terrace, Crag Hall; 53.21645°N 2.02024°W	—	c. 1820	The retaining wall to the terrace is at the front of the hall. It is built in stone and contains a flight of 13 steps leading down to the park.	II
Milepost; 53.25827°N 2.02878°W	—	c. 1820	The milepost is one of a set on the turnpike road from Macclesfield to Buxton. It is in cast iron, and consists of a cylindrical post with a cylindrical head. The head has three faces giving the distances in miles to the two towns, and the maker's name.	II
Milepost; 53.24605°N 2.00272°W	—	c. 1820	The milepost is one of a set on the turnpike road from Macclesfield to Buxton. It is in cast iron, and consists of a cylindrical post with a cylindrical head. The head has three faces giving the distances in miles to the two towns, and the maker's name.	II
Milepost; 53.25893°N 2.04939°W	—	c. 1820	The milepost is one of a set on the turnpike road from Macclesfield to Buxton. It is in cast iron, and consists of a cylindrical post with a cylindrical head. The head has three faces giving the distances in miles to the two towns, and the maker's name.	II
Milepost; 53.25497°N 2.01252°W	—	c. 1820	The milepost is one of a set on the turnpike road from Macclesfield to Buxton. It is in cast iron, and consists of a cylindrical post with a cylindrical head. The head has three faces giving the distances in miles to the two towns, and the maker's name.	II
Milepost; 53.25497°N 2.01252°W		1821	The milepost is in cast iron. It is in the form of a bollard, and has a belled-our base. The milepost carries three panels; two give the distances in miles to Macclesfield and Buxton, and the third is blank. The maker's name is on the stem.	II
Parish boundary stone 53.25086°N 2.07321°W	—	1822	The boundary stone is in sandstone, and has a semicircular top. On the east face is inscribed the date and "M" (for Macclesfield).	II
Parish boundary stone 53.25065°N 2.07406°W	—	1822	The boundary stone is in sandstone, and has a semicircular top. On the east face is inscribed the date and "M" (for Macclesfield).	II
Parish boundary stone 53.25623°N 2.07067°W	—	1822	The boundary stone is in sandstone, and has a semicircular top. On the east face is inscribed the date and "M" (for Macclesfield).	II
Old Post Office; 53.21581°N 2.02605°W		Early 19th century	This originated as the offices for Crag Works, and was later used as a post office, a house for the postmaster, and a village hall. It is built in sandstone with Kerridge stone-slate roofs. The building is in three storeys and has a front of seven bays. The central bay projects forward and has a round-headed doorway, and a pediment containing a clock face. The windows are multi-paned sashes.	II
Edinboro Terrace; 53.21643°N 2.02678°W		c. 1830	A terrace of cottages built for mill workers, originally eight, later converted into four. They are constructed in gritstone and have Kerridge stone-slate roofs. The cottages are in two storeys, and each cottage has three windows in the ground floor and two in the storey above. The windows are casements with a glazed arch above containing Gothick tracery.	II
Parish boundary stone 53.24230°N 2.06400°W	—	1849	The boundary stone is in sandstone, and has a semicircular top. Both faces are inscribed with the date, and one face has "S" (for Sutton), and the other has "F" (for Forest).	II
Parish boundary stone 53.22934°N 2.04931°W	—	1849	The boundary stone is in sandstone, and has a triangular section and a domed top. The faces are inscribed with the date, one face also has "S" (for Sutton), another has "F" (for Forest), and the third has "W" (for Wildboarclough).	II
St Saviour's Church; 53.21612°N 2.02466°W		1901–09	The church was built for the 16th Earl of Derby to celebrate the safe return of his sons from the Boer War. It is constructed in sandstone and has Kerridge stone-slate roofs. The church consists of a nave, a south porch, a chancel, a north vestry, and a battlemented west tower.	II
Telephone kiosk 53.21555°N 2.02600°W		1935	A K6 type telephone kiosk, designed by Giles Gilbert Scott. Constructed in cast iron with a square plan and a dome, it has three unperforated crowns in the top panels.	II

== See also ==
- Listed buildings in Hartington Upper Quarter, Derbyshire
- Listed buildings in Leekfrith, Staffordshire
- Listed buildings in Macclesfield
- Listed buildings in Quarnford, Staffordshire
- Listed buildings in Rainow
- Listed buildings in Sutton
- Listed buildings in Wincle
