= Forest Chapel =

Coordinates: 53.2463°N 2.0399°W

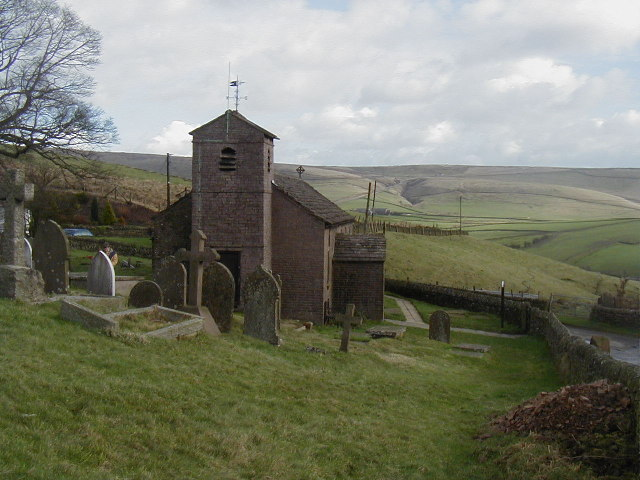
- Forest Chapel

- Location in Cheshire
- OS grid reference: SJ 974 722
- Location: Macclesfield Forest; Cheshire
- Country: England
- Denomination: Anglican

History
- Founded: 1673
- Dedication: Saint Stephen
- Consecrated: 1834

Architecture
- Functional status: Active
- Heritage designation: Grade II
- Designated: 14 April 1967
- Architectural type: Church
- Groundbreaking: 1673
- Completed: 1834

Specifications
- Materials: Sandstone; Kerridge stone-slate roof

Administration
- Province: York
- Diocese: Chester
- Archdeaconry: Macclesfield
- Deanery: Macclesfield
- Parish: Rainow with Saltersford and Forest

Clergy
- Vicar: Revd Simon Gowler

Forest Chapel, officially the Church of St Stephen, stands in an isolated position in the civil parish of Macclesfield Forest and Wildboarclough in Cheshire, England, within the Peak District National Park 4.5 miles (7 km) from Macclesfield. It is recorded in the National Heritage List for England as a designated Grade II listed building. It is an Anglican church in the diocese of Chester, the archdeaconry of Macclesfield and the deanery of Macclesfield. Its benefice is combined with those of Jenkin Chapel, Saltersford and Holy Trinity, Rainow.

== History ==
The original chapel was built in 1673. In about 1720 Francis Gastrell, Bishop of Chester, noted that it was not consecrated. The chapel was almost entirely rebuilt in 1834. Originally a chapel of ease for St Peter's Church, Prestbury, it became the district church for the chapelry of Macclesfield Forest and Wildboarclough in 1906, but in 1973 the latter was combined with St Michael's Church, Wincle, and Macclesfield Forest merged with the ecclesiastical parish of Rainow.

== Architecture ==
=== Exterior ===
It is built in sandstone with a Kerridge stone-slate roof. The nave and chancel are in one range of five bays. On the south wall is a porch. At the west end is a tower with a saddleback roof and there are louvres in the bell-openings. The tower contains one bell.

=== Interior ===
The interior is very plain. On the chancel wall is a white marble memorial to the memory of Rev Samuel Hall, a former minister of the church. Over the porch doorway is a benefaction board. Built into the east end wall is a stone altar. The east window contains some Victorian glass. The chapel registers begin in 1759 with some loose sheets dating back to 1746.

== Present day ==
The old tradition of rushbearing still takes place at the chapel each August on the 2nd Sunday in the month. Regular Services include monthly evensong on the first Sunday on the month at 3pm and weekly 'Light in the Forest' service on Wednesdays at 12.30pm.

== See also ==
- Listed buildings in Macclesfield Forest and Wildboarclough
