= Tegg's Nose =

Hill and country park in Cheshire, England

Coordinates: 53.24949°N 2.08089°W

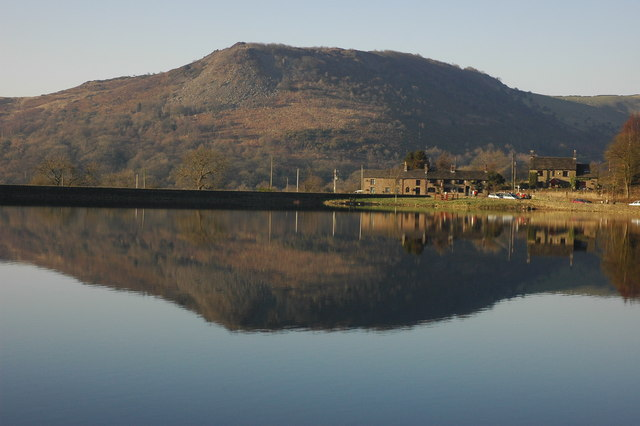
- Tegg's Nose from Ridgegate Reservoir

Highest point
- Elevation: 380 m (1,250 ft)

Geography
- Location: Cheshire, England
- Parent range: Peak District
- OS grid: SJ947725
- Topo map: OS Outdoor Leisure 24

Tegg's Nose is a hill east of Macclesfield in Cheshire, England. It has a short ridge with a high point of 380 metres (1,250 ft) at SJ947725, terminating in a promontory at the southern end. It lies on the western edge of the Peak District, although outside the boundary of the national park. Much of the hill's area falls within the Tegg's Nose Country Park, managed by Cheshire East Council Countryside Management Service; Tegg's Nose is also part of the Environmentally Sensitive Area Scheme.

Historically quarried for millstone grit, Tegg's Nose now includes a range of environments including moorland, meadow, farmland, broadleaved woodland and is rich in wildlife. Recreational uses of the area include walking, orienteering, horse riding, fell running, cycling, mountain biking, rock climbing, sledging and fishing.

== History ==
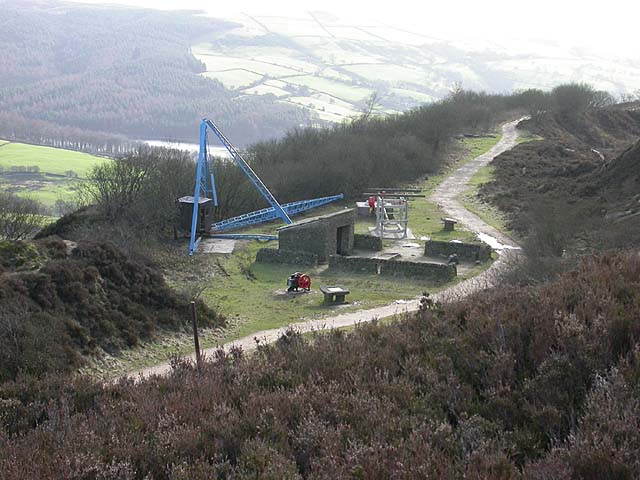
Historical quarry equipment

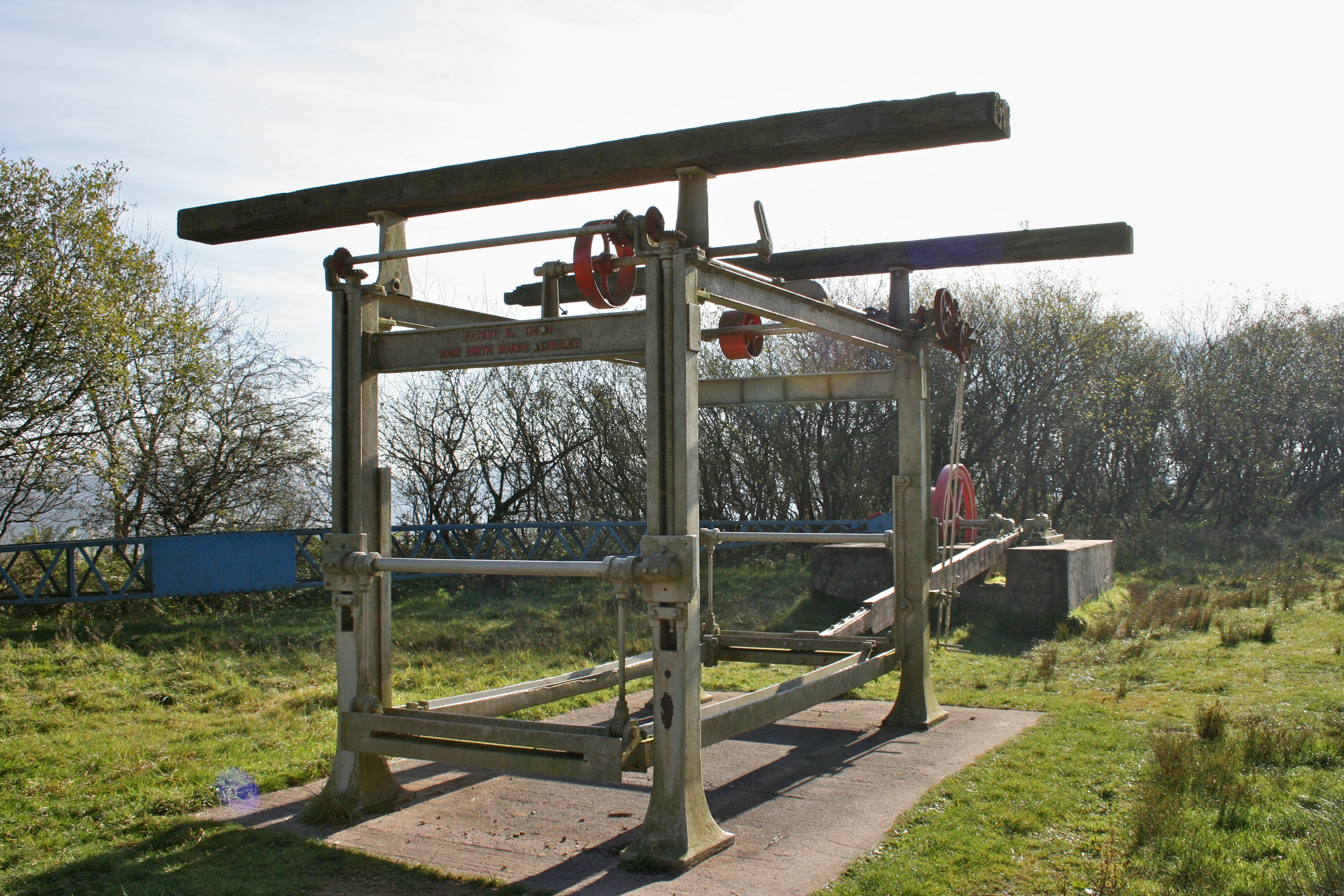
Stone saw at the quarry

Originally called "Tegge's Naze", "Tegge" might have been the name of an early Norse settler or might refer to a sheep ("teg"), while "nose" probably refers to the southern promontory. The area is believed to have been occupied during the Bronze Age, and there is a Bronze Age barrow near High Low Farm south of Tegg's Nose. After the Norman Conquest it formed part of the Royal Forest of Macclesfield, a hunting reserve owned by the Earls of Chester.

The hill was quarried for millstone grit from the 16th century until 1955. There were two quarries, one by the northern viewpoint at Windyway producing a blue stone, and the other near the Tegg's Nose summit producing Tegg's Nose Pink. Quarrying was originally by hand, giving a high-quality product used for buildings, gravestones, kerbs, flagstones and cobbles, which was used as far afield as the Isle of Man. Blasting was introduced in the 1930s, producing crushed stone for roads and airfields, and during the Second World War, rock for runways was extracted using pneumatic drills. A collection of historical quarrying equipment is preserved within the country park, including a jaw crusher, crane and a stone saw, which was powered by a steam engine. There is evidence of a railway track around the disused summit quarry. There is also evidence of a bomb crater at the bottom of Tegg's Nose, caused by a German bomber during WW2, which can be seen from the summit.

The Bottoms and Teggsnose reservoirs were constructed in 1850 and 1871, respectively, to regulate the flow of the River Bollin feeding the textile mills of Macclesfield and Langley, which once had five water-powered silk mills. The nearby Ridgegate Reservoir to the east was constructed at a similar time to provide drinking water for Macclesfield, with Trentabank Reservoir following in the 1920s.

== Ecology and geography ==
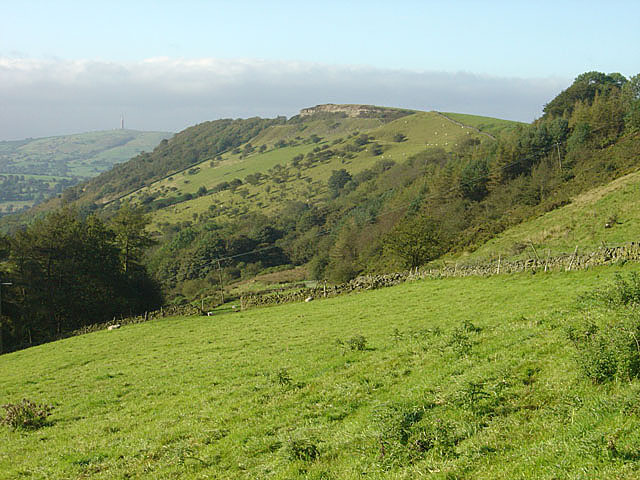
Tegg's Nose from Walker Barn

Much of the area is a mixture of moorland and meadows. The moorland is dominated by wood sage, heather and bilberry, while the meadows support a range of wild flowers including mountain pansy, tormentil and harebell. At lower elevations, gorse, bramble and hawthorn appear. The broadleaved Teggsnose Wood covers the southern part of the hill, with oak, beech, hornbeam, holly and mountain ash.

Birds observed in the area include woodpeckers, nuthatches, flycatchers, tree creepers, thrushes, tits, warblers, buzzards and ravens, as well as various waterfowl on the reservoirs including grebes and tufted ducks. The area is grazed in summer by Angus Cross cattle from a farm in Langley.

At the base of the hill to the south lie the small Bottoms Reservoir (34 million gallons) and Teggsnose Reservoir (24.5 million gallons), with the Walker Barn stream feeding the latter.

== Activities ==
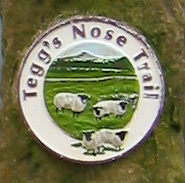
Tegg's Nose Trail marker

The Tegg's Nose ridge has three viewpoints. On clear days the views across the Cheshire Plain to the west take in Liverpool and the Welsh hills. To the east can be seen Macclesfield Forest and the distinctive hill of Shutlingsloe.

Several public footpaths, concessionary paths and bridleways cross the area. The Tegg's Nose Trail is a circular waymarked trail of 4 km (2.5 mi) around the area; part of the trail is a bridleway. The waymarkers for this trail take the form of circular plaques depicting the view towards Shutlingsloe. The "Walk to the Forest" is another waymarked circular trail of 11 km (6.8 mi) linking Tegg's Nose and the plantation of Macclesfield Forest. Saddlers Way, which forms part of both of these trails, was a former packhorse track. Tegg's Nose lies on the Gritstone Trail long-distance footpath, forming the end of the northern stage and the start of the central stage. The Peak District Boundary Walk follows the same route through the country park. It also forms an access point for ascending Shutlingsloe via Macclesfield Forest.

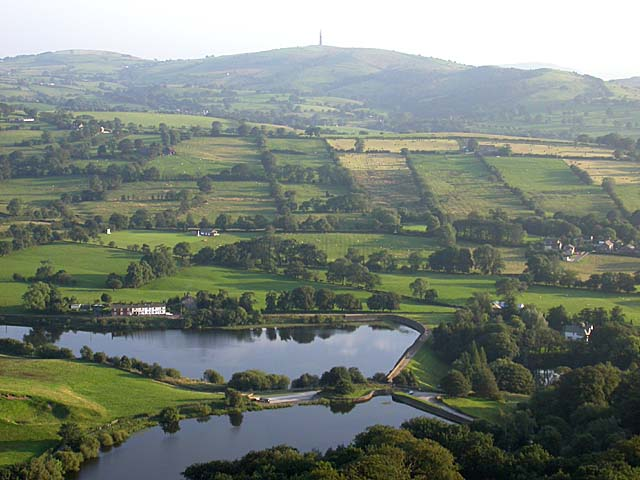
Teggsnose and Bottoms Reservoirs from Tegg's Nose viewpoint

The area is used for orienteering, with several permanent courses available. The Tegg's Nose Fell Race is run annually in August.

Three cycling routes start at Tegg's Nose. "Grit and Gears" is a 19 km (12 mi) partly off-road circular trail suitable for mountain bikes; "Riding the Ridges" is a 28 km (17 mi) circular route on minor roads with optional off-road sections; and Regional Cycle Route 71 is a long-distance linear road route. The Cheshire Cycleway (route 70) also passes just to the south and east of the country park.

There are ten traditional climbing routes on the quarried gritstone, ranging in grade from Difficult to Mild Very Severe. Sledging is popular in winter, with fields set aside for the activity. Private coarse fishing is available at Teggsnose and Bottoms Reservoirs, with mirror and common carp and bream.

== Facilities and access ==
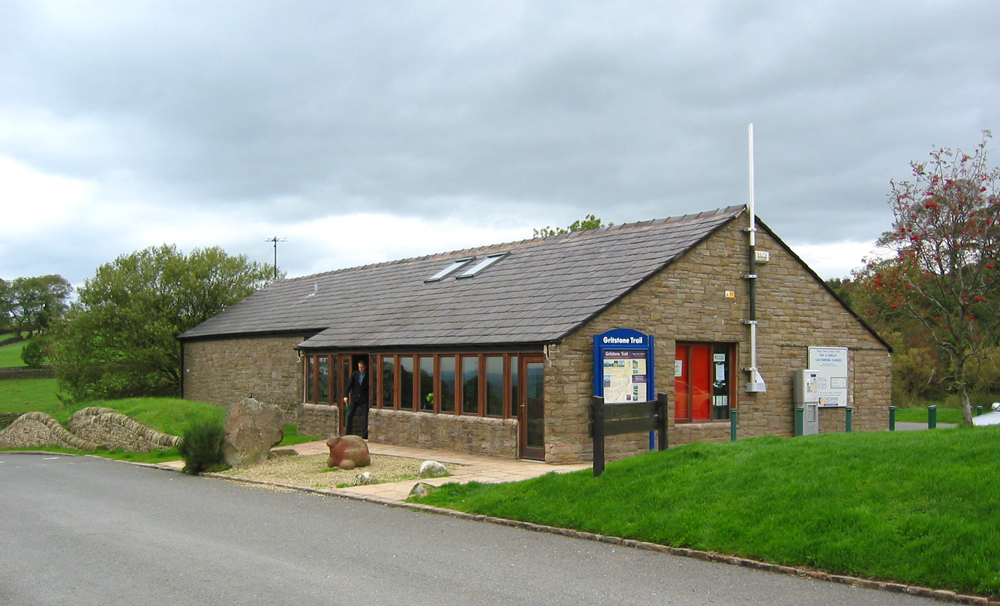
Visitor centre and sheep sculpture

At the northern viewpoint is a visitors' centre off the Buxton Old Road, which provides car and horse box parking, information, public toilets, picnic tables and a telescope. As of spring 2016 there is a tea room, open seven days a week. Several open-air sculptures stand near the visitors' centre; these include a stone sheep, a bench with an abstract tree and a set of carved wooden benches surrounding the viewpoint. Car parking is also available by Teggsnose Reservoir and at the Trentabank ranger station in Macclesfield Forest. Nearby public houses are the Leather's Smithy by Ridgegate Reservoir and the St Dunstan in the village of Langley.

The area can be reached by bus from Macclesfield or Buxton. Wheelchair access is limited owing to the nature of the terrain, and there are unfenced vertical drops. Local tourist accommodation is very limited.

== Views ==
The summit of Tegg's Nose provides a 360° view over the nearby town of Macclesfield and the Cheshire Plain.

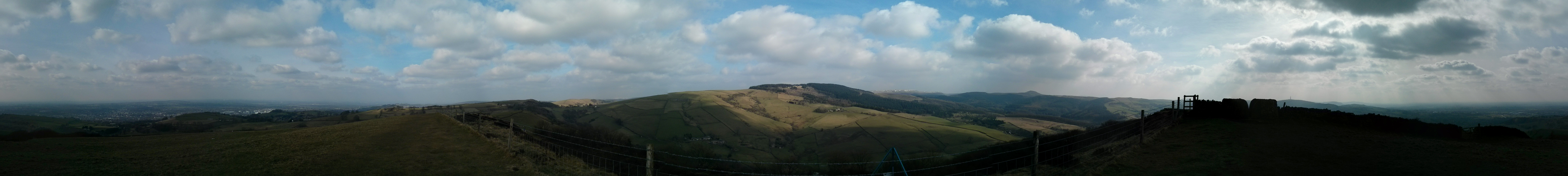
Panorama taken from summit of Tegg's Nose in March 2016

== See also ==
- List of geographical noses
