= Jenkin Chapel =

Coordinates: 53°17′11″N 2°01′32″W

Jenkin Chapel, Saltersford
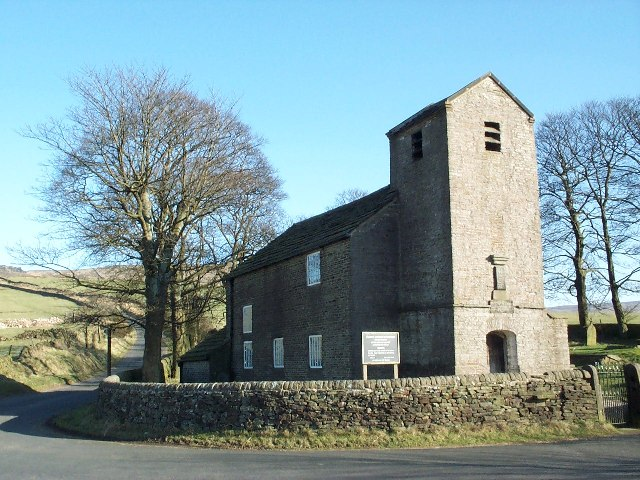
- Jenkin Chapel in 2003

- Location in Cheshire
- OS grid reference: SJ 983 766
- Location: Saltersford, Cheshire
- Country: England
- Denomination: Anglican

History
- Status: Parish church
- Founded: 1733
- Dedication: John the Baptist

Architecture
- Functional status: Active
- Heritage designation: Grade II*
- Designated: 14 April 1967
- Architectural type: Church
- Groundbreaking: 1733
- Completed: 1755

Specifications
- Materials: Stone; Kerridge stone-slate roof

Administration
- Province: York
- Diocese: Chester
- Archdeaconry: Macclesfield
- Deanery: Macclesfield
- Parish: Rainow with Saltersford and Forest

Clergy
- Vicar: Revd Simon Gowler

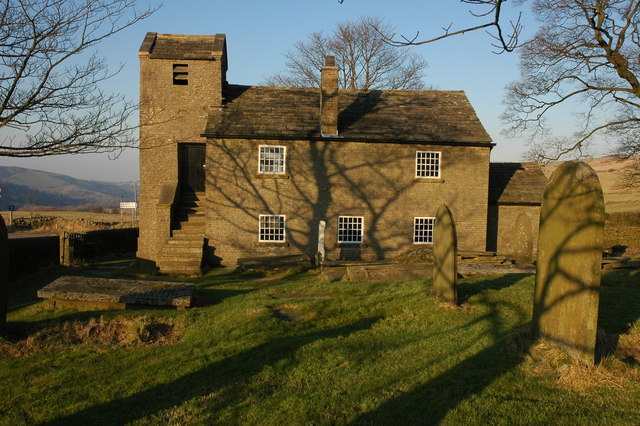
From the south, showing tower staircase

Jenkin Chapel is an Anglican parish church in Saltersford, Cheshire, England. Standing in an isolated position on the western slopes of the Pennines, 4.3 miles (7 km) northeast of Macclesfield, it is recorded in the National Heritage List for England as a designated Grade II* listed building. The chapel lies at the junction of three ancient trackways, known as "salters' ways" because they were used by packhorses carrying salt. Later the tracks were used by cattle drovers and sheep dealers. It is an Anglican chapel in the diocese of Chester, the archdeaconry of Macclesfield and the deanery of Macclesfield. Its benefice is combined with those of Holy Trinity, Rainow and Forest Chapel, Macclesfield Forest.

== History ==
The chapel was built using local materials in 1733 by local people who also raised money to pay for a minister. A tower was added in 1755.

== Architecture ==
The appearance of the chapel is more that of a Georgian farmhouse with a chimney stack than a church. It consists of a two-storey nave, a one-storey chapel and vestry, and a three-stage tower with a saddleback roof. The tower has an external staircase, a bell chamber and a porch with stone benches. A chimney rises from the middle of the south wall. The windows are Georgian in style, with sashes and small panes of glass.

Inside the chapel are box pews, an octagonal pulpit and a carved reading desk. The chancel is panelled and divided from the nave by rails consisting of turned balusters. Hanging from a lintel at the entrance to the chancel are similar balusters forming an arch. In the chancel is a small stone font with an oak cover. At the west end is a gallery on which is the coat of arms of the Stopford family who lived in nearby Saltersford Hall (itself a Grade II listed building) in the 17th century. On the floor are grave slabs relating to the Turner family who were later residents of the hall. Chapel registers date from 1770.

== Name ==
There is disagreement about the origin of the name "Jenkin". One theory is that the junction was the trading site for a man called Jenkin, from Ruthin, North Wales. The track-marking stone at this point was known as "Jenkin Cross". Other theories are that Jenkin was the name of a local farming family, or that it was the name of a "fiery Welsh preacher" who preached at the horse fair held here.

== Current use ==
The church is open all year round. Evensong is at 3pm on the third Sunday of the month between Easter and Christmas as well as special services, including Carols by Candlelight in December and the Big Sing in Summer.

The church featured in an episode of Hunted, shown on Channel 4 on 4 January 2018.

== Appearances in popular culture ==
The chapel features in Alan Garner's 2003 novel Thursbitch, which is set in the surrounding area, and in which the chapel's foundation is a passing plot point in the region's integration into the Christian world.

== See also ==
- Grade II* listed buildings in Cheshire East
- Listed buildings in Rainow
