= Listed buildings in Rainow =

Rainow is a civil parish in Cheshire East, England. It contains 69 buildings that are recorded in the National Heritage List for England as designated listed buildings. Of these, three are listed at Grade II*, the middle grade, and the others are at Grade II. Apart from the village of Rainow, the parish is now rural, although in the past there has been industry in the form of small mills. One of the listed buildings is a former water mill, but most are country houses and associated structures, smaller houses and cottages, and farmhouses with farm buildings. Otherwise the listed buildings are milestones, mile posts, boundary stones, weirs, a bridge, a folly, stocks, and two churches.

== Key ==
Grade	Criteria
II*	Particularly important buildings of more than special interest
II	Buildings of national importance and special interest

== Buildings ==
Name and location	Photograph	Date	Notes	Grade
Saltersford Hall and farm buildings 53.28338°N 2.02556°W		1593	A farmhouse and farm buildings that were later altered. They are in sandstone, partly rendered, and have a Kerridge stone-slate roof. The farmhouse has an L-shaped plan, is in two storeys, and has a west front of three bays with two gables. The central doorway has a segmental head and a triangular pediment containing initials. To the right is a datestone. There are farm buildings attached to the south and to the west.	II
Hough Hole House; 53.28394°N 2.08149°W	—	c. 1600	Originally a farmhouse, it was altered in 1796 and again in the 1980s. It is built in sandstone and has a roof of concrete tiles. The house is in two storeys, and has a near-symmetrical three-bay front. The windows are casements.	II
Charles Head House; 53.30576°N 2.03267°W	—	Late 16th to early 17th century	A small manor house, altered in 1764, it is built in sandstone with a Kerridge stone-slate roof. It has a rectangular plan, is in two storeys, and has a four-bay front. The windows are mullioned, some containing casements. There is a gabled porch carrying the date of 1764.	II*
Charles Head Farmhouse; 53.30580°N 2.03276°W	—	Late 16th to early 17th century	The farmhouse was altered in the 18th and 20th centuries. It is built in sandstone with a Kerridge stone-slate roof, and has an L-shaped plan. The farmhouse is in two storeys, and has a three-bay north front containing 20th-century windows. At the rear are mullioned windows and a dovecote.	II
The Old Hall; 53.28206°N 2.07764°W		Early 17th century	This originated as a farmhouse, it was extended in 1690, and altered in the 20th century. It is built in sandstone with a Kerridge stone-slate roof. The house has a T-shaped plan, it is in two storeys, and has a three-bay south front. Some of the windows are mullioned, others date from the 20th century. Inside are timber-framed partition walls.	II
Sowcar Farmhouse; 53.29835°N 2.08703°W	—	Early 17th century	The farmhouse was extended later in the 17th century. It is built in sandstone with a Kerridge stone-slate roof. The farmhouse has a T-shaped plan, it is in two storeys, and has a three-bay front. In the left bay is a door approached by four steps; the other bays are gabled, and the windows are mullioned.	II*
No. 2 Tower Hill Farm; 53.27935°N 2.07954°W		Mid-17th century	The farmhouse and attached farm buildings are in sandstone with Kerridge stone-slate roofs. The farmhouse is in 2 1/2 storeys and has a three-bay front. The windows are casements. Inside, some of the partition walls are timber-framed. The farm buildings date from the later 17th century and from 1743.	II
Holly Tree Cottage and Tower Hill House; 53.27874°N 2.07987°W		17th century	Originally a house and stables, later two houses. They are in sandstone with a Kerridge stone-slate roof. The houses have an L-shaped plan with an added range, and are in two storeys with a three-bay south front. The windows are mullioned. Inside Holly Tree Cottage is a timber-framed partition.	II
Barn and shippon, Hough Hole House; 53.28387°N 2.08256°W	—	17th century	An outshut was added to the barn in the 18th century. It is built in sandstone with a Kerridge stone-slate roof. It contains doorways, a carriage entrance and ventilation slots. Above it is a chapel.	II
Rainowlow Farmhouse; 53.29116°N 2.07079°W	—	17th century	The farmhouse was extended in the 20th century, converting it from a rectangular plan to a T-shaped plan. It is in sandstone with a Kerridge stone-slate roof. The house is in two storeys, and has a two-bay south front, the right bay projecting slightly forward. All the windows date from the 20th century. Included in the listing are two bee boles in the garden wall.	II
Barn, Rainowlow Farm; 53.29128°N 2.07109°W	—	17th century	The barn was extended in the 18th and 19th centuries. It is in sandstone with a Kerridge stone-slate roof. The barn is a long, low building. On the east front are doors, two square pitch holes, and a line of ventilation slots.	II
Tower Hill Cottage; 53.27932°N 2.07857°W		17th century	The cottage was extended later in the 17th century, and in the 20th century. It is in sandstone with a Kerridge stone-slate roof, and has an L-shaped plan. There is one mullioned window, the other windows being 20th-century replacements. Inside the cottage is a timber-framed partition.	II
Brookhouse Farmhouse; 53.27432°N 2.08262°W		Late 17th century	The farmhouse was extended in the 18th century. It is in sandstone with a Kerridge stone-slate roof. The farmhouse has an L-shaped plan, is in two storeys, and has a four-bay front. The left three bays are original and contain mullioned windows; in the right bay the windows are casements. There are more mullioned windows in the rear wing.	II
Shippon and granary, Lima Farm; 53.29655°N 2.07625°W	—	Late 17th century (probable)	A carthouse was added in the 19th century. The building is in sandstone with a Kerridge stone-slate roof. It has a long rectangular plan in two storeys, and has a seven-bay front. Features include an exterior flight of steps and a mullioned window. Inside is a timber-framed partition with wattle and daub infill.	II
Barn, Sowcar Farm; 53.29847°N 2.08733°W	—	Late 17th century	A corn barn built in sandstone with a Kerridge stone-slate roof. It contains a cart entrance, a door, square pitch holes, and ventilation slots.	II
Withinlow Farmhouse; 53.29386°N 2.05572°W	—	Late 17th century	The farmhouse was altered in the 19th century. It is built is in sandstone with a Kerridge stone-slate roof, it is in two storeys, and has a four-bay front, the left three bays being the original building. The windows are sashes. Inside are timber-framed partition walls.	II
Barn, Withinlow Farm; 53.29385°N 2.05562°W	—	Late 17th century	The farm building is in sandstone with a Kerridge stone-slate roof. It has an L-shaped plan. The openings have wooden lintels with protective bands above them.	II
Water trough, Sowcar Farm; 53.29846°N 2.08700°W	—	1692	The water trough is rectangular, and has been carved from a block of sandstone. Inside is a setting for a circular container. The date is carved on the side.	II
Barn, shippon and pigcote, Lower House Farm; 53.28644°N 2.07086°W	—	1697	The oldest building is the barn, with the others dating from the 18th century. They are all in sandstone with Kerridge stone-slate roofs. The barn has a three-bay front facing the wall, and it contains a door, a cart entrance, and pitch holes. The shippon has three doorways, pitch holes, and two loading bays, and the pigcote has two entrances.	II
Brown House; 53.29791°N 2.06330°W		Late 17th to early 18th century	A farmhouse with an attached barn, it is in sandstone with a Kerridge stone-slate roof. The house is in two storeys, and has a three-bay west front. The windows are mullioned. In the barn is a doorway and ventilation slots.	II
Barn and shippon, Hedgerow Farm; 53.30071°N 2.07520°W		Early 18th century (probable)	The barn and shippon are built in sandstone with a Kerridge stone-slate roof. On the east front are doorways, two square pitch holes, and ventilations slots.	II
Lima Farmhouse; 53.29648°N 2.07547°W	—	Early 18th century	Major alterations were carried out in 1834. The farmhouse is built in sandstone with a Kerridge stone-slate roof, and has a double pile plan. It is in two storeys, and has a symmetrical three-bay front. Some of the windows are mullioned.	II
Corn barn, Lima Farm; 53.29633°N 2.07542°W	—	Early 18th century	The corn barn was extended later in the 19th century. It is built in sandstone with a Kerridge stone-slate roof, and has a three-bay front. It contains a central cart entrance, and two lines of ventilation slots.	II
Lowerbrook Farmhouse; 53.28551°N 2.07164°W	—	Early 18th century	The farmhouse is built in sandstone, its roof being partly in Kerridge stone-slate, and partly in Welsh slate. It has a square plan, is in 2 1/2 storeys, and has a symmetrical three-bay west front. The windows in the lower two storeys on the front are casements; in the top floor and at the rear of the building are mullioned windows. The doorway has a semi-circular head.	II
Old Vicarage; 53.27945°N 2.07619°W		1732	The house was extended in the 19th century, and altered further in 1948. It is in sandstone with a Kerridge stone-slate roof. The house has 2 1/2 storeys and a four-bay front. The doorway has a semicircular head with a fanlight, and the windows are sashes.	II
Church of St John the Baptist; 53.28626°N 2.02566°W		1733	The tower was added in 1754–55. The church was built in local materials and has a Kerridge stone-slate roof. It consists of a nave, a chancel, a vestry, and a west tower. The tower contains a porch, it has an external staircase and a saddleback roof. Inside the church are box pews, and a two-tier pulpit.	II*
Inscribed stone 53.27156°N 2.02030°W	—	1742	The standing stone is on Andrew's Edge. It is a tall, narrow gritstone block inscribed with initials and the date. There is also a faint graffito dated 1766.	II
Corn barn, Lowerhouse Farm; 53.28548°N 2.07233°W	—	Mid-18th century	The corn barn is built in sandstone and has a roof partly of Welsh slate, and partly of Kerridge stone-slate. It is in two storeys, and has a four-bay front. The barn contains a cart entrance, rectangular door openings, square pitch holes, and ventilation slots. There is a flight of stone steps against the right gable.	II
No. 1 Tower Hill Farm; 53.27945°N 2.07939°W		18th century	The farmhouse and farm buildings are in one range. They are built in sandstone with a Kerridge stone-slate roof, are in two storeys, and have a five-bay front. The right two bays comprise the farmhouse and contain sash windows. The left bay projects slightly forward. In the farm buildings there are square pitch holes.	II
Summerclose Farmhouse and barn 53.29767°N 2.03063°W		1755	The buildings are in sandstone with a Kerridge stone-slate roof. The farmhouse is in two storeys, and has a three-bay front. The windows are mullioned, and to the right of the doorway is a datestone. To the left is a corn barn with a cart entrance and ventilation holes.	II
Milestone; 53.30353°N 2.04094°W	—	c. 1770	The milepost is in sandstone. It has a triangular plan and a shaped top. It is painted with inscriptions giving the distances in miles to Chapel, Sheffield, Chesterfield, and Macclesfield.	II
Savio House; 53.29325°N 2.08324°W	—	c. 1775	The house was extended in 1833. It is built in sandstone with a hipped Welsh slate roof, and is in Greek Revival style. The house has a long rectangular plan, it is in two storeys and has a symmetrical five-bay north front with a Doric style porch. The windows are sashes, and on the west front is a Tuscan doorway. In the 1950s the house was used by a religious order, and it has since become a retreat centre for young people.	II
Cottage, Savio House; 53.29279°N 2.08290°W	—	Late 18th century	Originating as a farmhouse, it was extended in 1850 and has since been converted for other purposes. It is built in sandstone with a Kerridge stone-slate roof, and has a double pile plan. The original farmhouse is in two storeys with a symmetrical three-bay front. The extension contains an arched cart entrance that has a keystone with the date, a doorway, and two circular pitch holes. The windows are sashes.	II
Milestone; 53.27387°N 2.08296°W		Late 18th century	The milepost is in sandstone. It has a triangular plan and a shaped top. It is painted with inscriptions giving the distances in miles to Chapel, Sheffield, Chesterfield, and Macclesfield.	II
Milestone; 53.28409°N 2.06862°W	—	Late 18th century	The milepost is in sandstone. It has a triangular plan and a shaped top. It is painted with inscriptions giving the distances in miles to Chapel, Sheffield, Chesterfield, and Macclesfield.	II
Milestone; 53.29332°N 2.05295°W	—	Late 18th century	The milepost is in sandstone. It has a triangular plan and a shaped top. It is painted with inscriptions giving the distances in miles to Chapel, Sheffield, Chesterfield, and Macclesfield.	II
Millbrook Cottage; 53.27902°N 2.07739°W	—	Late 18th century	A pair of cottages converted into a house, it is in painted sandstone with a Kerridge stone-slate roof. The house is in two storeys, and has a four-bay front. There are two doorways, one blocked, and 20th-century casement windows. At the rear is a brick structure carried on cast iron columns.	II
Weir, Clough Pool; 53.28999°N 2.08722°W		1800	The weir is in sandstone. There is a curving dam wall with revetment walls, and three steps. Each side has a carved datestone, and between the sides are the remains of an iron sluice.	II
Weir and bridge, Wayside Cottage; 53.28486°N 2.08519°W	—	c. 1800	The weir and bridge are associated with the River Dean, and both are constructed in sandstone. The weir consists of 14 stone steps with revetment walls. The bridge has two segmental arches with plain parapets, on rectangular piers.	II
Parish Boundary Stone; 53.29359°N 2.09151°W	—	Late 18th to early 19th century	The stone marks the boundaries of three parishes, and is in sandstone. The lower part, which is buried in the ground has vertical sides, and the upper part is slightly sloping with a semicircular head. The stone is inscribed with "B" (for Bollington), "K" (for Kerridge), and "R" (for Rainow).	II
White Nancy; 53.29096°N 2.09235°W		1817	This structure was built as a folly or summer house to commemorate the victory at the Battle of Waterloo. It is a circular structure, built in sandstone and rendered. At its apex is a finial. Inside is a single room with stone benches and a circular stone table.	II
Ginclough Mill; 53.28502°N 2.06390°W		c. 1820	Originally a water powered silk throwing mill, it was extended later in the 19th century, and has been converted partly Into a house, and partly into a workshop. It is built in sandstone with a Kerridge stone-slate roof, and has a mill chimney, and a domestic chimney on a gable. The mill has a front of six bays, and is in two storeys on the north side and three on the south. On the north front is an external staircase, and at the east end are extensions, including a boiler house and a workshop.	II
The Mill House; 53.28498°N 2.06399°W		c. 1820	The house is attached to Ginclough Mill. It built in sandstone with a Kerridge stone-slate roof. The house is in two storeys and has a three-bay front. The windows are three-light casements.	II
Milepost; 53.26286°N 2.07047°W	—	c. 1820	The milepost is in cast iron and consists of a cylindrical head on a narrower post. It has three panels with inscriptions indicating the distances in miles to Macclesfield and Buxton.	II
Milepost; 53.26147°N 2.08708°W	—	c. 1820	The milepost is in cast iron and consists of a cylindrical head on a narrower post. It has three panels with inscriptions indicating the distances in miles to Macclesfield and Buxton.	II
Parish boundary stone 53.26002°N 2.09217°W	—	1822	The parish boundary stone is in sandstone. It consists of a block with a semicircular head, and is inscribed with "M" (for Macclesfield) and the date.	II
Parish boundary stone 53.29848°N 2.08811°W	—	Early 19th century	The parish boundary stone is close to a barn at Sowcar Farm. It is in sandstone and consists of a block with a semicircular head. It is inscribed with "B" (for Bollington), and "R" (for Rainow).	II
Boundary stone 53.29775°N 2.08764°W	—	Early 19th century	The boundary stone is set into a drystone wall, and consists of a sandstone block with a semicircular head. The stone is inscribed with the letter "B" (for Bollington).	II
Cesterbridge Cottage and Folds Cottage; 53.27241°N 2.08522°W	—	Early 19th century	This originated as three weavers' cottages, later converted into two houses. The building is in three storeys, and has a front of six bays. The windows in the lower two storeys are sashes, and in the top floor they are three-light casements.	II
Carthouse and stables, Lower House Farm; 53.28653°N 2.07113°W	—	Early 19th century	The farm buildings are in sandstone with a Kerridge stone-slate roof. They are in two storeys, and have a four-bay front. The buildings contain various openings, including pitch holes. Against the left gable is a mounting block with four steps.	II
Ginclough Cottage; 53.28514°N 2.06326°W	—	Early 19th century	The cottage is in sandstone with a Kerridge stone-slate roof. It has two storeys and a symmetrical three-bay front. On the front are 16-pane fixed windows and casements, and at the rear is a mullioned window.	II
New Inn Farmhouse; 53.25938°N 2.08865°W	—	Early 19th century	This farmhouse originated as an inn. It is in brick with stone dressings, and has a Kerridge stone-slate roof. The house is in two storeys, and has a symmetrical three-bay front. The central doorway has a semicircular head with a fanlight, and a rosette carved in the keystone. The windows are sashes.	II
Pedley Fold Farmhouse; 53.27967°N 2.07614°W		Early 19th century	This was originally a coach house and farm buildings that have been partly converted for domestic use. It is built in sandstone with a Kerridge stone-slate roof, and consists of two parallel ranges joined by a single-storey range. The building is in two storeys, and has a three-bay front. In the central bay is a blocked cart entrance with a semicircular-headed window above; there are similar windows in the lower floor of the outer bays, and lancet windows in the upper floor and in the gables. The rear range is a farm building.	II
Privy and pigeon loft, Rainowlow Farm; 53.29119°N 2.07105°W	—	Early 19th century (probable)	The earth privy and pigeon loft are built in sandstone with a Kerridge stone-slate roof. The building has a square plan, with a door on the east side to the privy, and on the left side a three-tier pigeon loft in the gable.	II
Stocks; 53.28253°N 2.07331°W		Early 19th century (probable)	The stocks consist of two octagonal sandstone pillars. Fitting into slots on the insides is a split wood plank containing four holes.	II
Estate boundary stone 53.28857°N 2.09134°W	—	1830	The state boundary stone is in sandstone and is sited in the base of a drystone wall. It is inscribed on both faces with the initials "T" and "G" and the date.	II
Pedestal tomb 53.28410°N 2.08193°W	—	1835	The tomb in the garden of Hough Hole House is that of Rachel Mellor, James Mellor junior and others. It is in sandstone, and consists of a square block on a moulded plinth. On top is a projecting capstone, and an urn decorated with acanthus and garlands.	II
Kerridge End House; 53.27283°N 2.08539°W	—	1837	A sandstone house with a half-hipped Welsh slate roof. It has a double pile plan, it is in two storeys and has a symmetrical three-bay front. The doorway has an Ionic architrave, and the doorcase is elliptical-headed with a fanlight. The windows are sashes, and the gables have a trapezium shape.	II
Stables, Kerridge End House; 53.27296°N 2.08510°W	—	1837	The stables are built in sandstone with a Kerridge stone-slate roof. They are in two storeys, and have a four-bay front with rusticated quoins. There are two doorways, one of which is blocked, two semicircular windows, and two circular pitch holes.	II
Cesterbridge House; 53.27241°N 2.08631°W	—	c. 1840	A sandstone house with a Kerridge stone-slate roof, it is in two storeys and has a symmetrical three-bay front. The central doorcase is reeded and is decorated with rosettes, and the windows are sashes.	II
Pedestal tomb 53.28410°N 2.08195°W	—	1841	The tomb in the garden of Hough Hole House is that of Sarah Mellor and others. It is in sandstone, and consists of a square block on a moulded plinth. The block contains recessed panels with inscriptions. On the top is a projecting capstone and an obelisk.	II
Pedestal tomb 53.28408°N 2.08201°W	—	1843	The tomb in the garden of Hough Hole House is that of James Walker. It is in sandstone, and consists of a square block on a moulded plinth. The block contains raised panels with inscriptions. On top is a projecting cross-gabled capstone, and an urn with acanthus decoration.	II
Private chapel, Hough Hole House; 53.28389°N 2.08249°W	—	1843	The chapel was built for and by James Mellor junior. It is in sandstone and has a stone flagged roof with a weathervane on a plinth. The chapel is on an upper storey above a barn, and is approached by an external spiral staircase. It is in three bays and above the door is an inscribed panel. Inside is a cast iron fireplace, and a wooden cupboard with a slot for a telescope.	II
Holy Trinity Church; 53.28076°N 2.07466°W		1845–46	This was a Commissioners' church designed by Samuel Howard. It is built in sandstone and has a roof of Welsh slate. The church consists of a nave, a short chancel and a west tower. The windows are lancets, and the tower has an embattled parapet and corner pinnacles. Inside the church are box pews and a west gallery.	II
Parish boundary stone 53.26066°N 2.09388°W	—	1849	The boundary stone is in sandstone. It consists of a triangular block with a domed top. It is inscribed with the initials "H" (for Hurdsfield), "R" (for Rainow), and "M" (for Macclesfield).	II
Conference Hall, Ingersley Hall; 53.29297°N 2.08268°W		c. 1850	This originated as the coach house for the hall and has been converted into a conference hall. It is built in sandstone and has a Welsh slate roof. The building is in two storeys with a symmetrical seven-bay front. The central bay projects forward and has a semicircular-arched opening above which is a triangular pediment containing a round window. The flanking bays contain arcades with semicircular-headed windows.	II
Sundial; 53.28397°N 2.08214°W	—	c. 1850	The sundial is in the garden of Hough Hole House. It is in sandstone and consists of a hexagonal pillar with a projecting capstone. It is inscribed with "JEMMY, JEMMY MIND YOUR OWN PEACE".	II
War memorial cross and seat 53.27911°N 2.07917°W		c. 1920	The cross and seat are in Kerridge stone, the cross commemorating those lost in the First World War, and the seat added following the Second World War. The cross is about 6 metres (20 ft) high, and consists of a tapering octagonal shaft carrying a wheel-head cross. The shaft has a decorated and moulded foot, and stands on a tapering pedestal on a two-stage base, itself on a step. On the pedestal is an inscription and the names of those lost in the First World War. The seat is behind the cross, and has a stone plaque with an inscription and the names of those lost in the Second World War. The whole memorial is in a small garden.	II

== See also ==
- Listed buildings in Bollington
- Listed buildings in Higher Hurdsfield
- Listed buildings in Kettleshulme
- Listed buildings in Lyme Handley
- Listed buildings in Macclesfield
- Listed buildings in Macclesfield Forest and Wildboarclough
- Listed buildings in Pott Shrigley
