= Ingersley Hall =

Country house in Cheshire, England

Coordinates: 53.29324°N 2.08322°W

Ingersley Hall, later Savio House, stands to the east of the town of Bollington, Cheshire, England. The house was built in about 1775 for John Gaskell. Extensions were added to it in 1833 for John Upton Gaskell. The house was sold by the Gaskell family in 1933. In the 1950s it was taken over by a religious order, the Salesians of Don Bosco, and renamed Savio House. As of 2011 the house is used as a retreat and activities centre for young people. The front of the house is constructed in ashlar, with the remainder in coursed sandstone rubble. The house is roofed in Welsh slate and has stone chimneys. It has a rectangular plan and is in two storeys. The architectural style is Greek Revival. The north front is symmetrical with five bays divided by pilasters. The porch is in Doric style. The west front has eight bays, the central three of which were in the original house. All the windows in the north and west fronts are sashes with 12 panes. The south door is in Tuscan style, and was probably moved from the west front. The house is recorded in the National Heritage List for England as a designated Grade II listed building. Also listed at Grade II is a former coach house to the south of the hall, built in about 1850, and converted into a conference hall in about 1950.

== See also ==
- Listed buildings in Rainow
