= Macclesfield Forest and Wildboarclough =

Civil parish in Cheshire, England

Coordinates: 53.233°N 2.033°W

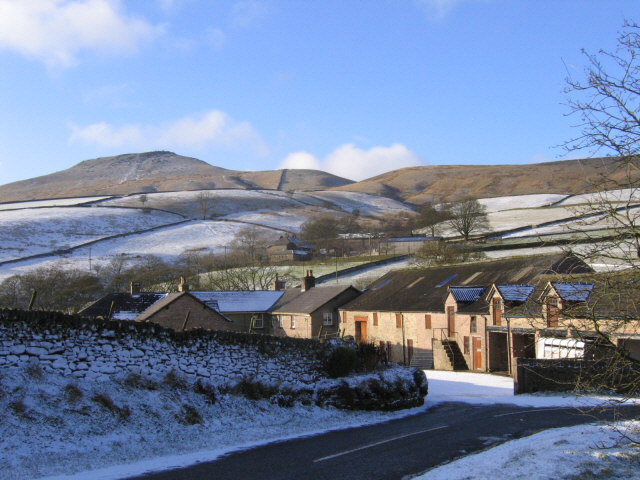
- Clough House in Wildboarclough

- Location within Cheshire
- Population: 189 (2011)
- OS grid reference: SJ977707
- Civil parish: Macclesfield Forest and Wildboarclough
- Unitary authority: Cheshire East
- Ceremonial county: Cheshire
- Region: North West
- Country: England
- Sovereign state: United Kingdom
- Post town: MACCLESFIELD
- Postcode district: SK11
- Dialling code: 01260
- Police: Cheshire
- Fire: Cheshire
- Ambulance: North West
- UK Parliament: Macclesfield

Macclesfield Forest and Wildboarclough is a civil parish in the unitary authority of Cheshire East and the ceremonial county of Cheshire, England. It lies on the western fringe of the Peak District National park. The population of the civil parish taken at the 2011 Census was 189.

The parish is small, so there is no parish council; instead, the residents hold a periodic Parish meeting. The area consists mainly of reservoirs, woodland, farmland, and moorland. There are no centres of population, only a few villages and hamlets, most notably Wildboarclough and Langley.

== See also ==
- Listed buildings in Macclesfield Forest and Wildboarclough
- Forest Chapel
- Macclesfield Forest
