= Crag Hall =

Country house in Wildboarclough, Cheshire

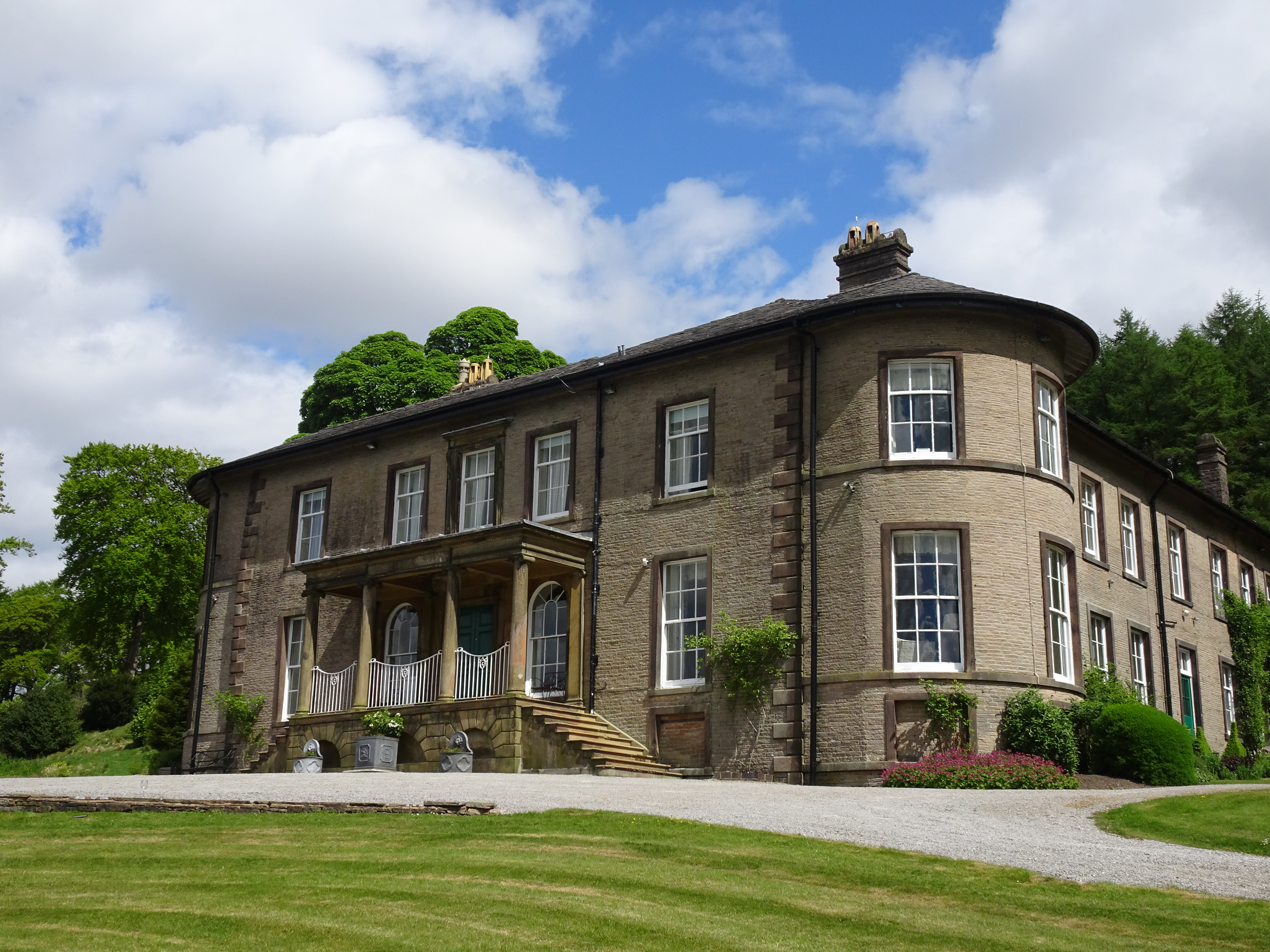
- Crag Hall

- Location within Cheshire
- 53.21634°N 2.01960°W
- Location: Wildboarclough, Cheshire

History
- Built: c.1815

Site notes
- Owner: Earl of Derby
- Website: craghall.co.uk

Listed Building – Grade II*
- Official name: Crag Hall
- Designated: 14 April 1967
- Reference no.: 1329979

Crag Hall is a country house east of the village of Wildboarclough, Cheshire, England and owned by the Earl of Derby.

== Description ==
It was built in 1815 by George Palfreyman, the owner of a textile printing works nearby. It has since been extended by the addition of large curved bow windows at each end of the entrance front. The house is constructed in brick-sized blocks of brown sandstone, with ashlar quoins and dressings. It is roofed in slate. The house is in two storeys. The entrance front has five bays. In the centre is a raised portico with four Ionic columns. It is approached from each side by a flight of steps. Its base is rusticated and contains three arched recesses. Above the portico is a window with an entablature. About the house, Figueirdo and Treuherz comment that "it has an imposing air of millstone grit solidity". The house is recorded in the National Heritage List for England as a designated Grade II* listed building. Associated with the house are three structures listed at Grade II: the gateway with its wing walls, the retaining wall to the garden terrace, and a wall and summer house in the garden.

The house is available for hire as holiday accommodation for up to 20 people.

== See also ==
- Grade II* listed buildings in Cheshire East
- Listed buildings in Macclesfield Forest and Wildboarclough
