= Hough Hole House =

Country house in Cheshire, England

- Location in Cheshire
- 53.2839°N 2.0815°W
- Location: Rainow, Cheshire, England
- OS grid reference: SJ 946 763

History
- Built: c. 1600

Site notes
- Restored: 1796
- Restored by: James Mellor

Listed Building – Grade II
- Designated: 9 December 1983

Hough Hole House is a historic house to the northwest of the village of Rainow, Cheshire, England. It dates from about 1660, and was altered and extended in 1796. An engineering works was added in the 1850s, and incorporated into the house during the 20th century. The house is recorded in the National Heritage List for England as a designated Grade II listed building. The gardens were created in the 19th century and are based on those described in John Bunyan's The Pilgrim's Progress. These were designed by the owner, James Mellor, and are known as Mellor's Gardens. The gardens contain a number of listed buildings.

== History ==
The house was built about 1600. In 1796 it was acquired by James Mellor, who was building a cotton mill nearby, and alterations were made to the house at this time. It was altered again in the 1850s by Mellor's son, also called James, who built an adjacent engineering works powered by water from a mill pool. The house continued to be owned by the Mellor family into the 20th century, and in the 1920s it was rented to the Misses Russell, sisters and schoolteachers, who later became the owners. In 1978 the house was bought by Gordon and Ruth Humphreys, who carried out a programme of restoration and alterations, which included converting the adjacent works and incorporating it into the house.

== Architecture ==
Hough Hole House is constructed in coursed, buff sandstone rubble. It has a concrete tiled roof and two stone chimneys. The house is in two storeys, and has a near-symmetrical three-bay front. The windows are 20th-century casements with stone lintels. There is a central doorway, above which is a datestone inscribed with JMM (for James Mellor) and the date 1796. Also at the front is a single-storey conservatory. Inside the house are fireplaces dating from the 18th and 19th centuries. The house is designated as a Grade II listed building. (Note: Grade II listed buildings are "of national importance and special interest". The incorporated former engineering works is excluded from the designation.)

== Associated features ==
The house is associated with gardens that were designed by James Mellor, junior, and are known as Mellor's Gardens. They have a religious theme based on John Bunyan's The Pilgrim's Progress. A pathway takes the visitor through and past features included in the book, ending in a two-storey building on a ridge representing the Celestial City on Mount Zion. The gardens are designated at Grade II in the Register of Historic Parks and Gardens. (Note: Grade II listing is given to "sites of special interest, warranting every effort to preserve them".) The gardens contain the following structures that are designated as Grade II listed buildings. Mellor's private chapel dates from 1844, and attached to the chapel is a barn dating from the 17th century. To the north of the chapel is a sundial dating from about 1850. Also in the garden are three pedestal tombs of members of the Mellor family and James Walker.

== See also ==
- Listed buildings in Rainow

== Notes and references ==
Notes

Citations

Sources

- Groves, Linden (2004), Historic Parks & Gardens of Cheshire, Ashbourne: Landmark, ISBN 978-1-84306-124-3
- Hartwell, Clare; Hyde, Matthew; Hubbard, Edward; Pevsner, Nikolaus (2011) [1971], Cheshire, The Buildings of England, New Haven and London: Yale University Press, ISBN 978-0-300-17043-6
- Turner, R. C. (1987), "Mellor's Gardens", Garden History, vol. 15:2, no. 2, Garden History Society, pp. 157–166, JSTOR 1586954
