= Mellor's Gardens =

- Location in Cheshire
- 53.2842°N 2.0817°W
- Location: Rainow, Cheshire, England
- OS grid reference: SJ 947 763

History
- Built: 1850s
- Built for: James Mellor

Site notes
- Area: c. 0.8 hectares (2 acres)

Listed Building – Grade II
- Type: Registered historical parks and gardens
- Designated: 14 December 1993
- Reference no.: 1001284

Mellor's Gardens are the gardens of Hough Hole House and are located to the northwest of the village of Rainow, Cheshire, England. They were created by James Mellor, a local industrialist, their design being inspired by the teaching of Emanuel Swedenborg, and are a representation of John Bunyan's The Pilgrim's Progress. Having been neglected in the 20th century, they have been restored and are open to visitors by arrangement. The gardens are listed at Grade II in the Register of Historic Parks and Gardens, and contain a number of Grade II listed buildings.

== History ==
James Mellor senior moved into Hough Hole House with his family in 1786. Mellor was a cotton manufacturer who was planning to build a new cotton mill nearby in the Ingersley Valley. His eldest son, also called James, had been born the previous year. Mellor senior died in 1828 and his son inherited the house and grounds. Mellor junior was a follower of Emanuel Swedenborg, a Swedish philosopher, one of whose concepts was that the natural world is an allegory of the spiritual world. Following this concept, he designed gardens around his house based on John Bunyan's The Pilgrim's Progress, an allegory describing the spiritual journey of a Christian through his life. Mellor described the gardens as "a Garden of Correspondence relating to things of the World and Scriptural History". He built the gardens himself, without help from staff or hired help. The gardens were open to the public, and were visited by thousands of people and remained open for some years after his death in 1891. In the 1920s the house and gardens were rented, and later owned, by two schoolteacher sisters, the Misses Russell. They added plants to the gardens, keeping its basic plan, but by the time that the second Miss Russell died, the gardens has become neglected. In 1978 the gardens were acquired by Gordon and Ruth Humphreys who, with the help of the county archaeologist, restored the gardens to their former state. In the 1990s they were taken over by the Rigby family. The gardens remain in private ownership, and are open to the general public on advertised dates and by appointment.

== Description ==
The gardens are located to the northwest of the village of Rainow. They are approximately triangular in shape and occupy an area of about 0.8 hectares (2 acres). The gardens are entered through a gate on Sugar Lane. The areas in the gardens, and the features they contain, are intended to represent the journey through the life of Christian in John Bunyan's The Pilgrim's Progress. Before entering the garden, the visitor is in their own City of Destruction. The first area is the Slough of Despond, originally a swampy area in Mellor's vegetable garden, now drained, paved, and used as a visitors' car park. The visitor then passes through the Wicket Gate to pass along the side of the house to the House of the Interpreter, formerly Mellor's stables. (Note: Here is an intended pun, as in the House of the Interpreter Christian was shown items to make him "stable".) The path goes up a slope between dry stone walls to represent the Wall called Salvation, and passes on to become the Holy Way. This takes the visitor to the former mill pond that represents the Pool of Siloam. (Note: The mill pond supplied power to the engineering works that Mellor built adjacent to Hough Hole House in the 1850s.) The path leads to a former cross, now a broken pillar, and the Cave of the Holy Sepulchre, where Christian loses the burden of his sin through the overflow hole of the mill pond. By the pond is a summerhouse bearing a plaque describing it as "Bethel or the House of God".

Here Christian is confronted with a choice between three paths, Difficulty, Danger, or Destruction. He is intended to choose the uphill path through the Arbour to the top of the hill of Difficulty. From the top of the hill is a view towards the Palace Beautiful, the back of Hough Hole House. The path leads over the Wobbly Bridge to a potting shed representing the Porter's Lodge, in front of which is a stone lion. Here there is also a reference to the novel Uncle Tom's Cabin, the shed representing the cabin, and the bridge representing the breaking ice of the Ohio River over which Eliza escaped with her baby. The path then leads along the side of the pond through the Valley of Humiliation and the Valley of the Shadow of Death. In the pond is a terracotta fish, representing the demon Apollyon. The path passes the Mouth of Hell, a niche by the side of the path, and the Cave at the end of the Valley, an opening covered by a hatch, to Vanity Fair, an area behind the former mill. After this, it passes through the Plain of Ease, by Hill Lucre, to a black pillar representing Lot's Wife, through the Meadow by the River of God, up to a level lawn, By-path Meadow, which was formerly Mellor's tennis court.

Originally the path led out of the gardens to a tenant's farmhouse, 300 metres (328 yd) away, representing Doubting Castle, the view of which is now obscured. Now the path leads down a grassy slope representing the Delectable Mountains, to a stone summerhouse, the Howling House. In the wall of this is a slot acting as an Aeolian harp, and a fireplace to produce smoke to fill the room. Next to this is the Country of Beulah, containing three pedestal tombs of members of the Mellor family. The path crosses the Dark River, goes through a sunken path representing again the Slough of Despond, and past a sundial. The path ends at the Celestial City on Mount Zion, a two-storey building standing on a ridge. The ground floor of this was a barn, and an external spiral staircase leads to the upper floor, which was used as Mellor's chapel.

In addition to the Pool of Siloam, other parts of the gardens were given biblical names, including a set of steps called Jacob's Ladder, and Mounts Gerizim, Pisgah and Nebo. Mellor planted the gardens with flowers and shrubs mentioned in the Bible. He also inscribed a number of stones with biblical quotations, and details of the family history, 16 of which have survived. He also created other features, including wooden posts painted with the names of the tribes of Israel, but these have not survived.

== Appraisal ==
Mellor's Gardens are designated at Grade II in the Register of Historic Parks and Gardens. Grade II listing is given to "sites of special interest, warranting every effort to preserve them". A number of structures in and around the gardens are designed as Grade II listed buildings. Grade II listed buildings are "of national importance and special interest". These include Hough Hole House itself, the chapel, and the barn under the chapel. The other listed buildings are the sundial, and the three pedestal tombs of members of the Mellor family and James Walker. The archaeologist who assisted the Humphries with the restoration of the gardens comments that the gardens are "not serious and solemn, but light and full of humour" and that they reflect the creator's character.

== Notes and references ==
Notes

Citations

Sources

- Groves, Linden (2004), Historic Parks & Gardens of Cheshire, Ashbourne: Landmark, ISBN 1-84306-124-4
- Hartwell, Clare; Hyde, Matthew; Hubbard, Edward; Pevsner, Nikolaus (2011) [1971], Cheshire, The Buildings of England, New Haven and London: Yale University Press, ISBN 978-0-300-17043-6
- Turner, R. C. (1987), "Mellor's Gardens", Garden History, vol. 15:2, Garden History Society, JSTOR 1586954
