= Allgreave =

Village in Cheshire, England

Coordinates: 53.200°N 02.042°W

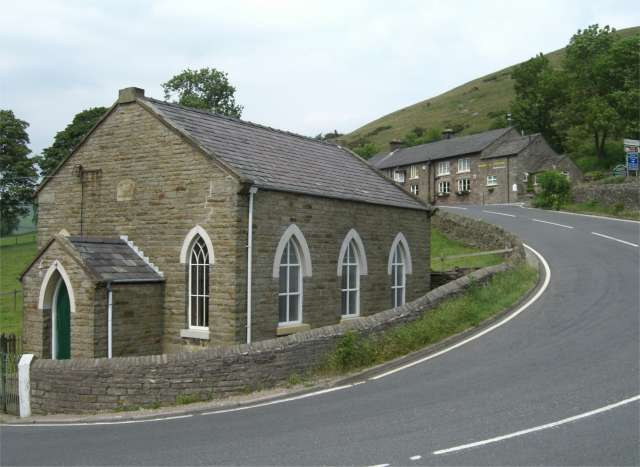
- Allgreave Methodist Chapel

- Location within Cheshire
- OS grid reference: SJ972669
- Civil parish: Macclesfield Forest and Wildboarclough; Wincle
- Unitary authority: Cheshire East
- Ceremonial county: Cheshire
- Region: North West
- Country: England
- Sovereign state: United Kingdom
- Post town: MACCLESFIELD
- Postcode district: SK11
- Dialling code: 01260
- Police: Cheshire
- Fire: Cheshire
- Ambulance: North West

Allgreave is a village in the civil parishes of Macclesfield Forest and Wildboarclough and Wincle, in the Cheshire East district, in the ceremonial county of Cheshire, England. It lies on the A54 (Buxton to Congleton) road, near to the border with Staffordshire.

Allgreave Methodist Chapel is situated in a sharp bend of the A54. The Rose and Crown public house also stands on the main road.
