= Holy Trinity Church, Rainow =

Coordinates: 53.2808°N 2.0746°W

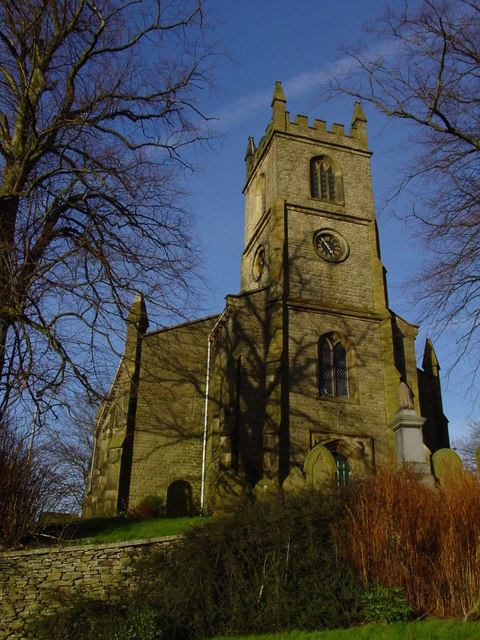
- Holy Trinity Church, Rainow

- Location in Cheshire
- Location: Rainow, Cheshire
- Country: England
- Denomination: Anglican
- Website: rainowchurches.org

History
- Status: Parish church

Architecture
- Functional status: Active
- Heritage designation: Grade II
- Designated: 9 December 1983
- Architect: Samuel Howard
- Architectural type: Church
- Style: Gothic Revival
- Groundbreaking: 1845
- Completed: 1846

Specifications
- Materials: Sandstone, slate roofs

Administration
- Province: York
- Diocese: Chester
- Archdeaconry: Macclesfield
- Deanery: Macclesfield
- Parish: Rainow with Saltersford and Forest

Clergy
- Vicar: Revd Simon Gowler

Holy Trinity Church is in the village of Rainow, Cheshire, England. It is an active Anglican parish church in the deanery of Macclesfield, the archdeaconry of Macclesfield, and the diocese of Chester. Its benefice is combined with those of St John, Saltersford, and St Stephen, Forest. The church is recorded in the National Heritage List for England as a designated Grade II listed building. It was a Commissioners' church, having received a grant towards its construction from the Church Building Commission.

== History ==
Holy Trinity was built in 1845–46, the architect being Samuel Howard of Disley, and the builder John Mellor of Rainow. A grant of £400 (equivalent to £40,000 in 2025) was given towards its construction by the Church Building Commission.

Today there are weekly services on Sunday mornings at 10am, including Holy Communion and Family Services. There is also a monthly Celtic-style Eucharist at 6.30pm on the second Sunday of the month, as well as monthly mid-week Holy Communion on the first Thursday of the month at 11.30am. This is followed by a Bring and Share lunch. Special services happen regularly throughout the year as well as lots of community groups and events, including the annual Rainow Church Fete and Scarecrow Fortnight in July.

== Architecture ==
The church is constructed in buff sandstone. It is roofed in Welsh slates, and has a stone ridge. The plan consists of a broad four-bay nave, a short chancel, and a west tower. The tower is embraced by low towers carrying the stairs to the gallery. The tower is in three stages with angle buttresses. In the bottom stage is a west door, over which is a window containing Y-tracery. The middle stage contains circular clock faces, and the top stage has three-light louvred bell openings. At the summit is an embattled parapet with corner pinnacles. Along the sides of the church the bays are divided by buttresses, each bay continuing a two-light lancet window with Y-tracery. At each corner of the church is a pinnacle. The east window has three lights with intersecting tracery.

Inside the church is a west gallery carried on octagonal iron posts. There was a wide central aisle flanked by box pews. The church has been re-ordered and some box pews remain. The majority have been removed and chairs are now used. The space allows for the church to be a multi-use space, suitable for fundraising and community events. In the gallery is a small two-manual organ, its date and maker being unknown.

== Churchyard ==
The churchyard contains two Commonwealth war graves, of a Royal Engineers soldier of World War I and a Royal Army Service Corps soldier of World War II.

== See also ==
- Listed buildings in Rainow
