= Trentabank Reservoir =

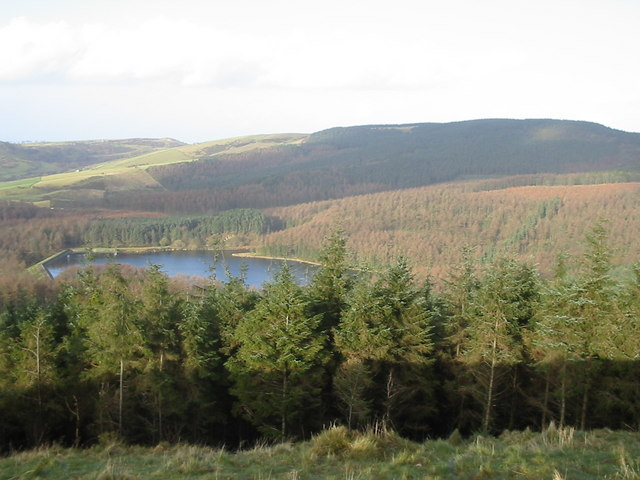

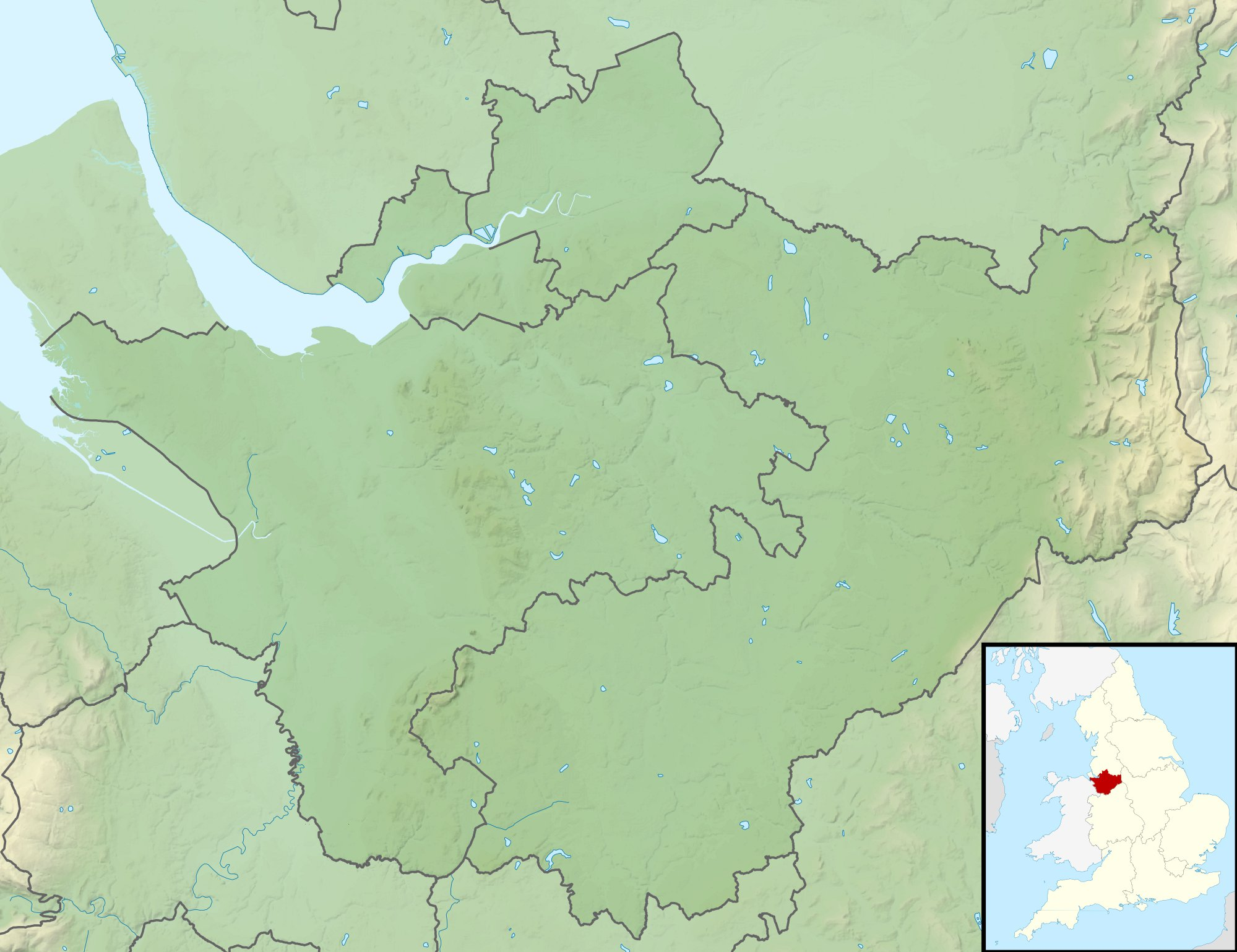
- Location within Cheshire
- Location: Macclesfield Forest, Cheshire
- Coordinates: 53°14′20″N 2°3′27″W
- Type: reservoir
- Basin countries: United Kingdom
- Surface area: 23 acres (9.3 ha)

Trentabank Reservoir is within Macclesfield Forest, partly in the Peak District National Park, in England, and is home to rich unimproved uplands and grasslands. The reservoir is surrounded mainly by coniferous plantations and is also home to about 22 pairs of herons. The Peak District Boundary Walk runs past the reservoir.

== Water supply ==
Trentabank is the uppermost of four reservoirs that collect water from the hills at the head of the River Bollin, and water from Trentabank and Ridgegate supplies Macclesfield with the town's drinking water. The other two reservoirs are Bottoms and Teggsnose Reservoirs.

== Nature reserve ==
Trentabank Reservoir Nature Reserve is a 42.7-acre (17.3 ha) nature reserve within Macclesfield Forest, consisting of the reservoir itself along with a small area of the surrounding conifer plantations; it is managed by the Cheshire Wildlife Trust.

On the doorstep of the Peak District, the reservoir (as well as the surrounding woodland) is owned by United Utilities and supplies the town of Macclesfield with drinking water. Although a working environment, the area is a haven for wildlife. Perhaps best known for its heronry (thought to be the largest in the Peak District, with over 20 breeding pairs), the reserve is also home to ravens and birds of prey. Red deer are shy residents of the forest but can often be seen drinking from the reservoir in early morning. Changing water levels occasionally expose the reservoir banks, which become a popular feeding ground for small wading birds, including common sandpipers, green sandpipers and little ringed plovers. Flocks of crossbills are regularly seen feeding in the treetops, and winter visitors include goldeneyes and goosanders.

== Statistics ==
The reservoir consists of 42.7 acres (17.3 ha) within Macclesfield Forest.
