= Macclesfield Forest =

Royal forest in Cheshire, England

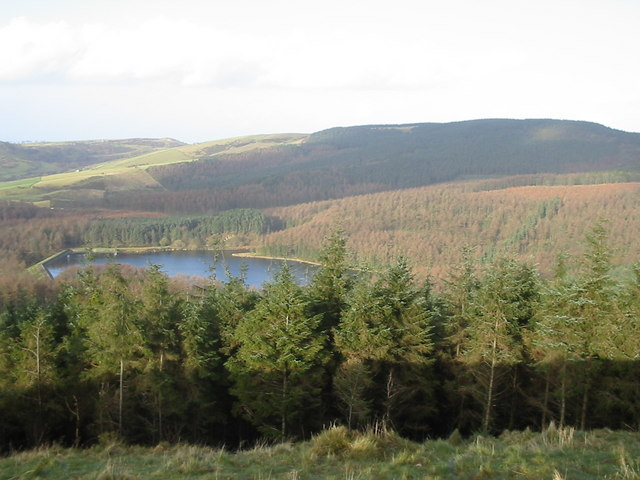
- Macclesfield Forest and Trentabank Reservoir
- Interactive map of Macclesfield Forest

Geography
- Location: Cheshire, North West England
- Coordinates: 53.238°N 2.054°W
- Elevation: 225–475 metres (738–1,558 ft)
- Area: 1,025 acres (415 hectares)

Macclesfield Forest is an area of woodland, predominantly conifer plantation, around 3 miles (5 km) south east of Macclesfield in the civil parish of Macclesfield Forest and Wildboarclough, in Cheshire, England.

The existing woodland is the last substantial remnant of the Royal Forest of Macclesfield, a once-extensive ancient hunting reserve. The area also includes two reservoirs, Trentabank and Ridgegate. Macclesfield Forest lies on the western edge of the Peak District, within the South West Peak, and is partly inside the boundary of the National Park. The hills of Tegg's Nose and Shutlingsloe stand to the north west and south east, respectively; the moorland of High Moor lies to the south and the Goyt Valley lies to the north east. Nearby villages include Langley and Wildboarclough.

Macclesfield Forest is owned by United Utilities. Most of the woodland is designated a Site of Biological Importance, while part of the area including Trentabank Reservoir is a nature reserve managed by the Cheshire Wildlife Trust; the reserve contains a large heronry. Other wildlife includes a small herd of red deer. Recreational uses of the area include walking, orienteering, horse riding, cycling, mountain biking, fishing and birdwatching.

== History ==
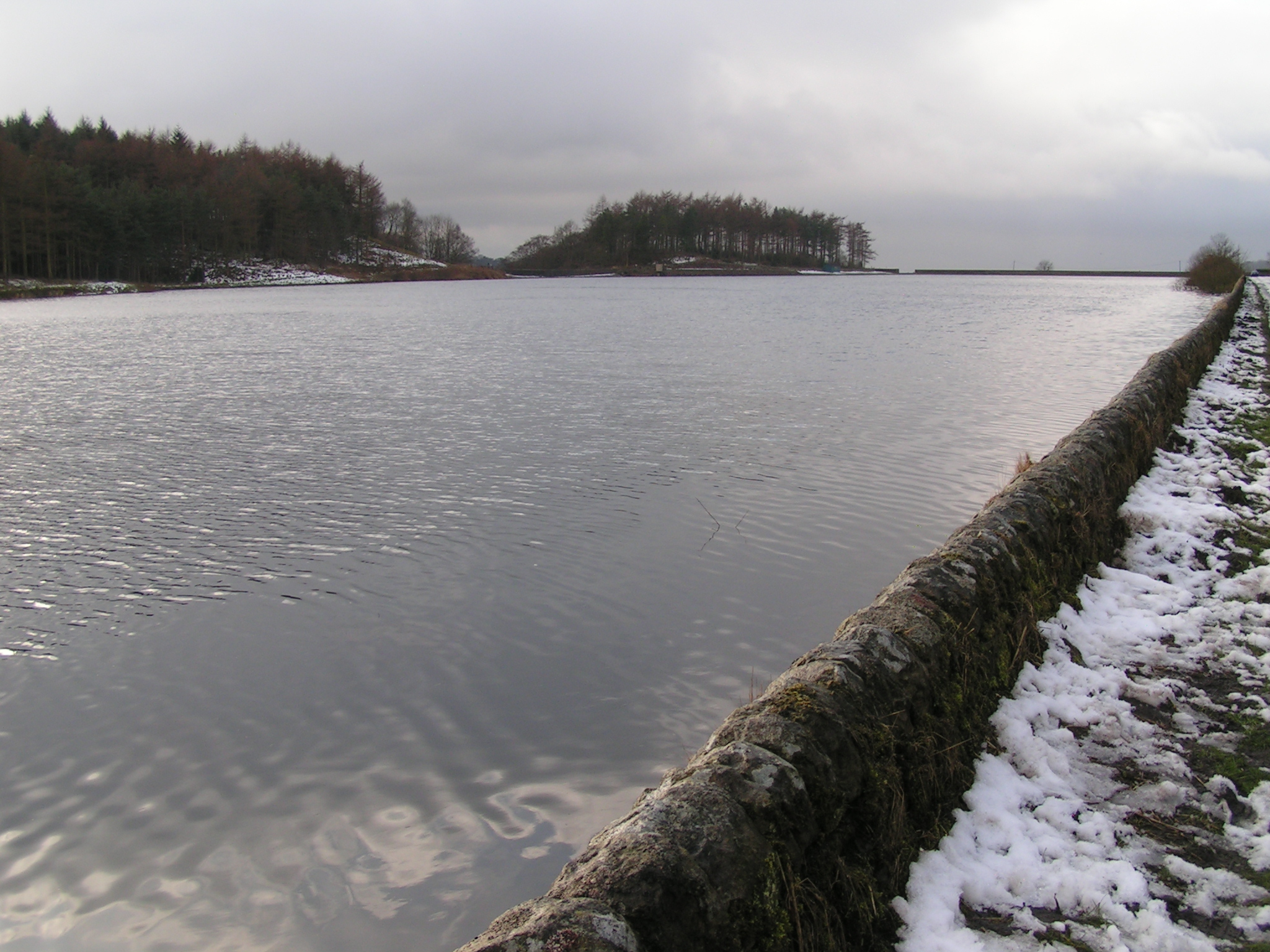
Ridgegate Reservoir

The area is believed to have been occupied during the Bronze Age; there is a Bronze Age barrow near High Low Farm west of Macclesfield Forest and another (a scheduled monument) east of the forest near Toot Hill. After the Norman Conquest, the modern area known as Macclesfield Forest formed part of the much larger region of the Royal forest of Macclesfield, a hunting reserve owned by the Earls of Chester, which formerly stretched from the foothills of the Pennines east into the High Peak near Whaley Bridge and south to Staffordshire Moorlands. Remains of a medieval deerpound survive on Toot Hill.

South of the forest stands the Greenway Cross (SJ955692), a standing stone carved on each side with a cross, which was probably erected as a waymarker by Dieulacres Abbey in Leek during the Middle Ages. Tradition holds that poachers in the royal forest were executed at a nearby gallows, which might be the source of the name of the Hanging Gate public house, from the Norse gata, meaning "path".

Ridgegate Reservoir was constructed in the late 19th century to provide drinking water for the town of Macclesfield, with Trentabank Reservoir following in the 1920s. The conifer plantation largely dates from 1930 to 1950, and was planted around the reservoirs to protect water catchment areas from pollution.

== Geography and ecology ==
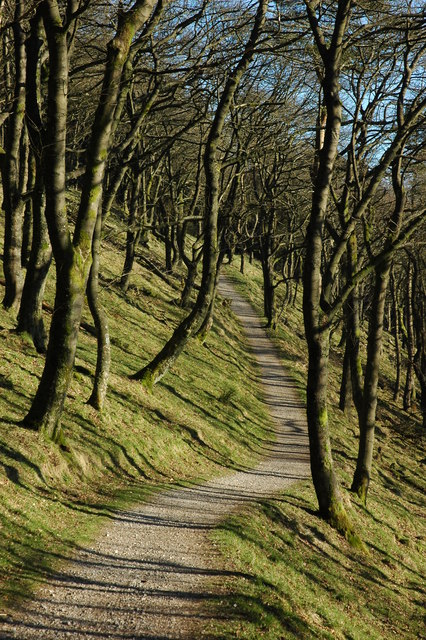
Broadleaved woods in Macclesfield Forest

Macclesfield Forest lies on the western edge of the Peak District, within the South West Peak. The eastern two-thirds of the forest fall within the Peak District National Park, and the area has been covered by the Park's ranger service since the 1970s. A total of 401 hectares (990 acres) has been designated a Site of Biological Importance (grade A); an area of 19 hectares (47 acres), including all of Trentabank Reservoir, was also made a non-statutory nature reserve in 1982, and is managed by the Cheshire Wildlife Trust.

The area ranges in elevation from around 225 metres to 475 metres, and includes two hills, Toot Hill (SJ970719) in the east and Nessit Hill (SJ962706) in the south. Within the forest are two reservoirs, Trentabank (SJ962713) and Ridgegate (SJ954713), which are fed by Bollin Brook. They are the highest of a series of four reservoirs, the lower two being the Bottoms and Teggsnose Reservoirs, south of Tegg's Nose.

A continuous area of approximately 400 hectares (990 acres) is covered with woodland or plantation. The forest is managed for timber by United Utilities, using a continuous cover policy (rather than clear felling and restocking). Macclesfield Borough Council plans to increase the area of the former royal forest that is covered by woodland. The predominant species are Sitka spruce and Japanese larch, with some Scots pine, lodgepole pine, Corsican pine and Norway spruce. There are also areas of semi-natural mixed and broadleaved woodland, mainly oak, sycamore and beech; in 2004, broadleaved species made up 23% of the total, although current forestry management aims to increase the proportion. The woodland supports mosses and thirty species of fungi, including fly agaric, stinkhorns, honey fungus and the sickener. The area also includes areas of acidic unimproved upland grassland, including approximately a hectare within the Trentabank nature reserve; this supports species including bluebell, tormentil, pignut, birdsfoot trefoil, foxglove and lesser knapweed, while the reservoir margins support aquatic plants including amphibious bistort, water mint, water horsetail and common spikerush.

A heronry is located by Trentabank Reservoir within the reserve; with around twenty-two nests, it is the largest in the Peak District. The heronry is visible from several viewpoints, and close-up CCTV pictures of the nests can also be seen in the Trentabank ranger station. Other birds observed in the woodland include crossbills, siskins, goldcrests, pied flycatchers, garden warblers, blackcaps and woodcocks, while the reservoirs support abundant waterfowl including cormorants, coots, goldeneyes, pochard, mallards, tufted ducks, teal, great crested grebe, little grebe and common sandpipers. A herd of around twelve red deer, the remnant of the royal forest herd, still frequents the forest. Small mammals present in the woodland include badgers and weasels.

== Sights and activities ==
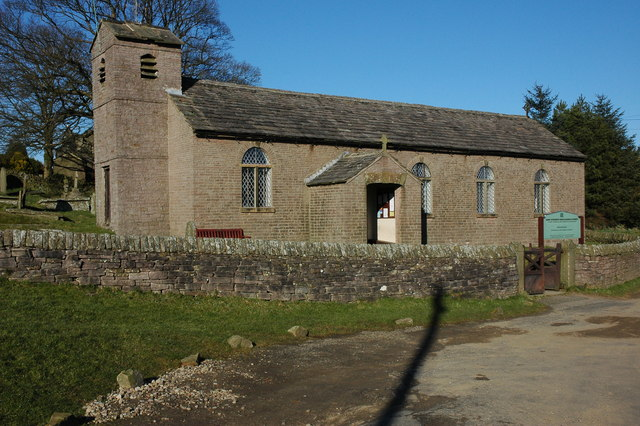
St Stephen's Church

St Stephen's Church, known as Forest Chapel, is immediately east of Macclesfield Forest at SJ974721. In pink sandstone with a stone and slate roof, the church dates originally from 1673; the chancel and nave were rebuilt in 1831. It is a Grade II listed building. St Stephen's still holds a rush-bearing ceremony every August, in which rushes are cut from nearby fields and marshes and strewn on the church floor and plaited into decorations as a symbol of renewal. The tradition ceased in most other churches in the 17th century. Other attractions in the area include a small arboretum near the Trentabank ranger station.

Several public footpaths, concessionary paths and bridleways cross the area. Three circular walks of different lengths (0.5–5.5 miles or 1–9 km) are waymarked for exploration of the forest area; one is suitable for wheelchair access. Additionally, the "Walk to the Forest" is a waymarked circular trail of 7 mi (11 km) linking Macclesfield Forest with Tegg's Nose hill. Macclesfield Forest is also the starting point of a popular ascent of Shutlingsloe. The Gritstone Trail long-distance footpath runs immediately to the west of the forest, and the Peak District Boundary Walk runs through the forest. The forest area is used for orienteering events. There are several mountain biking routes, including both off-road trails and routes on country lanes.

Fishing is permitted on the Ridgegate Reservoir; the fishing rights are leased by the Macclesfield and District Fly Fishing Club.

== Facilities and access ==
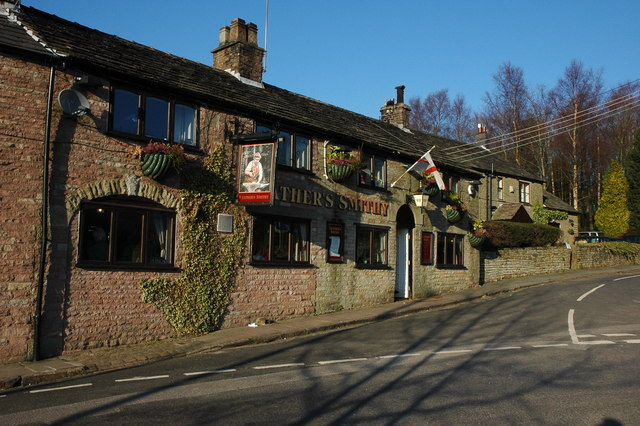
Leather's Smithy public house

There is a ranger station south of the Trentabank Reservoir (SJ961711), with car parking (including disabled spaces), public toilets, picnic area, benches and informative displays. Parking is also available at Ridgegate Reservoir and at the Standing Stone area on the eastern edge of the forest, as well as at the nearby Tegg's Nose Country Park.

By the Trentabank ranger station is a kiosk serving food, which is a member of the Peak District Foods group. Nearby public houses include the Leather's Smithy by Ridgegate Reservoir, St Dunstan in the village of Langley, Hanging Gate south of Langley and the Stanley Arms (now closed) in Bottom-of-the-Oven; refreshments are also available at Blaze Farm on the A54 and at teashops on the A537 and in the village of Wildboarclough.

The area can be reached by bus from Macclesfield or Buxton. There is limited wheelchair access, including an easy-access, stone-surfaced path to one of the Trentabank Reservoir herony viewing points. Dogs are permitted but must be kept under control. Nearby tourist accommodation is very limited.
