= Langley, Cheshire =

Village in Cheshire, England

Coordinates: 53.241°N 2.092°W

Langley
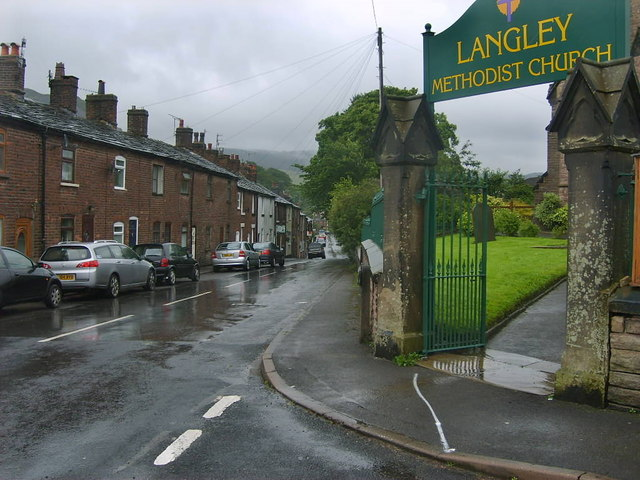
- Main Road

- Location within Cheshire
- Area: 0.2300 km^{2} (0.0888 sq mi)
- Population: 554 (2020 estimate)
  - Density: 2,409/km^{2} (6,240/sq mi)
- Civil parish: Sutton
- Unitary authority: Cheshire East
- Ceremonial county: Cheshire
- Region: North West
- Country: England
- Sovereign state: United Kingdom

Langley is a semi-rural village in civil parish of Sutton, in the Cheshire East district, in the ceremonial county of Cheshire, England, on the River Bollin, near Macclesfield and Macclesfield Forest. In 2020 it had an estimated population of 554.

Langley Mill, founded by William Smith in 1826, became the biggest silk printing, dyeing and finishing works in the world. The mill later went on to become Specialised Automobile Services, a specialist wire wheel manufacturer for classic and modern cars.

The painter Charles Tunnicliffe was born in Langley and painted many birds at the four reservoirs behind the village in Macclesfield Forest.

The village pub, The St Dunstan, is located on Main Road (the main road through the village). Langley also has a Methodist church and a village hall.

== In popular culture ==
Langley was mentioned in the first episode of the TV series Ashes to Ashes, in February 2008, when DI Alex Drake, played by Keeley Hawes, mentions Langley, Virginia, most famous as home to the headquarters of the Central Intelligence Agency. Her colleague, DC Chris Skelton, remarks "isn't that near Macclesfield?". Skelton is played by Macclesfield-born actor Marshall Lancaster.

== See also ==
- Langley Hall, Cheshire
