= Wildboarclough =

Village in Cheshire, England

Coordinates: 53.216°N 2.026°W

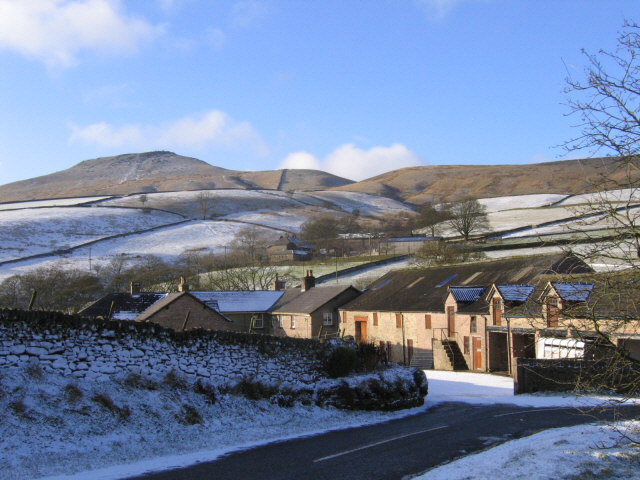

- Location within Cheshire
- OS grid reference: SJ983688
- Civil parish: Macclesfield Forest and Wildboarclough
- Unitary authority: Cheshire East
- Ceremonial county: Cheshire
- Region: North West
- Country: England
- Sovereign state: United Kingdom
- Police: Cheshire
- Fire: Cheshire
- Ambulance: North West

Wildboarclough (/ˈwɪlbərklʌf/ WIL-bər-kluf) is a village in the Macclesfield Forest, in the civil parish of Macclesfield Forest and Wildboarclough, in the Cheshire East district of Cheshire, England, within the Peak District National Park. Bilsborough states that the name arises from the rapid rise in levels of the Clough Brook after a heavy fall of rain, but Mills gives it as a deep valley (or clough) frequented by wild boar. According to old legend it was the place where the last wild boar in England was killed.

Wildboarclough was formerly a township in the parish of Prestbury, in 1866 Wildboarclough became a civil parish, on 1 April 1981 the parish was abolished and merged with Macclesfield Forest to form "Macclesfield Forest and Wildboarclough". In 1971 the parish had a population of 148.

From the nearby summit of Shutlingsloe (506 metres (1,660 ft)), which lies just to the north-west of the village, a wide panorama of the Cheshire Plain and the Peak District can be obtained. In clear conditions the view extends as far as the Mersey Estuary and the Welsh Clwydian Hills 40 miles (64 km) to the west, and the cooling towers of the power stations on the banks of the River Trent 50 miles (80 km) to the east. Nearby is the hamlet of Saltersford. The Peak District Boundary Walk runs through the village.

== See also ==
- Crag Hall
- St Saviour's Church, Wildboarclough
