= Saddleback roof =

Type of roof

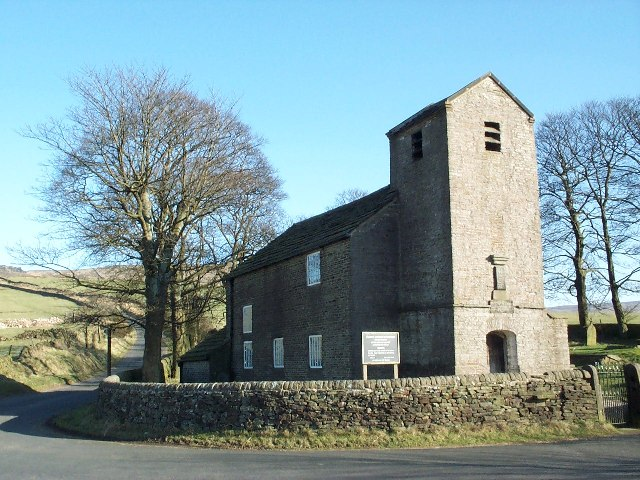
Jenkin Chapel in Cheshire, showing its saddleback roof

A saddleback roof is usually on a tower, with a ridge and two sloping sides, producing a gable at each end.

== See also ==
- List of roof shapes
- Saddle roof
