= Jack Hawkes =

Jack Hawkes may refer to:

- Jack Hawkes (botanist) (1915–2007), British botanist
- Jack Hawkes (tennis) (1899–1990), Australian tennis player

== See also ==
- John Hawkes (disambiguation)
- John Hawks (disambiguation)
