= Aylett =

Aylett may refer to:

- Aylett (name), given name and surname
- Aylett, Virginia, U.S., unincorporated community in King William County
