= John Hawkes =

John Hawkes may refer to:

- John Hawkes (actor) (born 1959), American film and television actor
- John Hawkes (novelist) (1925–1998), postmodern American novelist
- John Hawkes (tennis) (1899–1990), Australian tennis player
- Jack Hawkes (botanist) (John Gregory Hawkes, 1915–2007), British botanist
- J. H. M. Hawkes (John Henry Mason Hawkes, 1851–1944), South Australian businessman
- John Hawkes (horseman), Australian equestrian in the Australian Racing Hall of Fame
- John Hawkes (MP) for Bristol (UK Parliament constituency)

== See also ==
- Jack Hawkes (disambiguation)
- John Hawk (disambiguation)
- John Hawke (disambiguation)
- John Hawks (disambiguation)
