= John Hawk =

John Hawk or Johnny Hawk may refer to:

== People ==
- John D. Hawk (1924–2013), U.S. Army soldier and Medal of Honor recipient
- John Hawk (photobiologist) (1942–2022)
- John Layfield (born 1966), American professional wrestler whose stage names included John Hawk and Johnny Hawk

== Fictional characters ==
- John Hawk, fictional character portrayed by Burt Reynolds in the American television series Hawk
- Johnny Hawk, an alternate name for British electronic musician Global Goon

== See also ==
- John Hawke (disambiguation)
- John Hawkes (disambiguation)
- John Hawks (disambiguation)
