= New Hall, Woodford =

Country house in Greater Manchester, England

New Hall
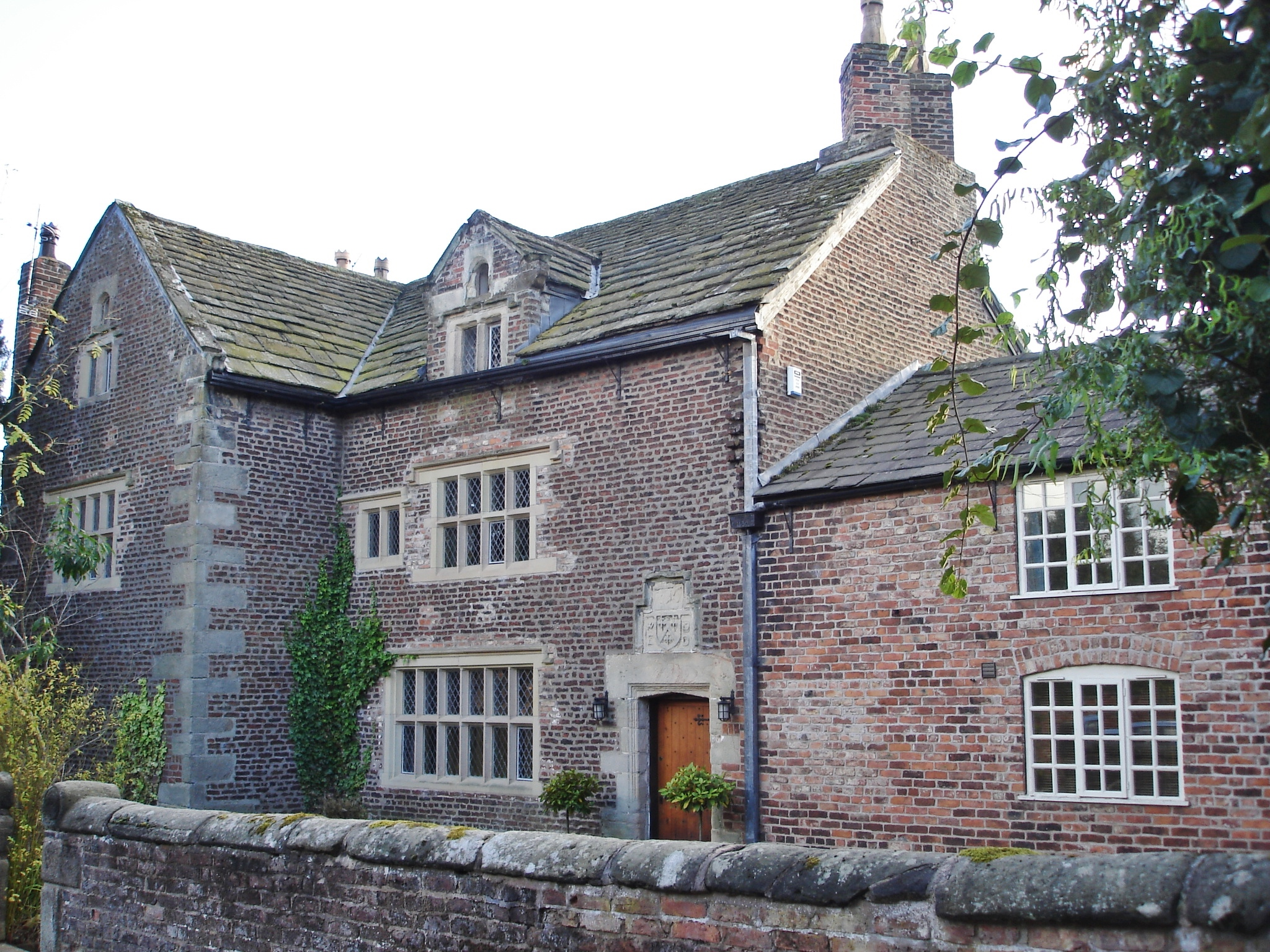
- New Hall, Woodford

- Location within Greater Manchester

General information
- Location: Old Hall Lane, Woodford, Greater Manchester, England
- Coordinates: 53.3331°N 2.1680°W
- Completed: 1630

Technical details
- Material: Brick, stone, slate

Design and construction
- Designations

Listed Building – Grade II*
- Official name: New Hall Farm
- Designated: 8 August 1966
- Reference no.: 1260441

New Hall is a 17th-century house on Old Hall Lane in Woodford, a village within the Metropolitan Borough of Stockport, Greater Manchester, England. Above the door there is a Tudor-arched lintel with the date '1630' along with the initials 'WDED' (William and Elizabeth Davenport) and the family shield. Another branch of the Davenport family owned Bramall Hall in nearby Bramhall. The house, along with an adjoining cottage, is a Grade II* listed building.

== See also ==
- Grade II* listed buildings in Greater Manchester
- Listed buildings in Hazel Grove and Bramhall
