= Dorothy Davenport (embroiderer) =

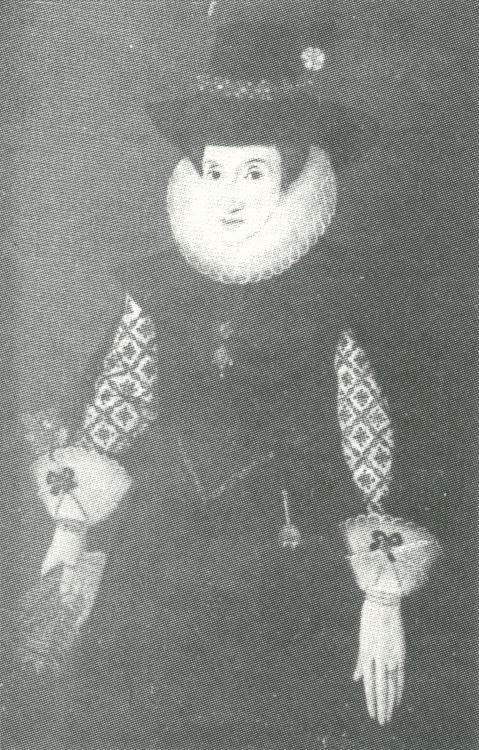
Dorothy Davenport, from a portrait dated 1627

Dorothy Davenport née Warren (1561–1639) was an English aristocrat known for her embroidery.

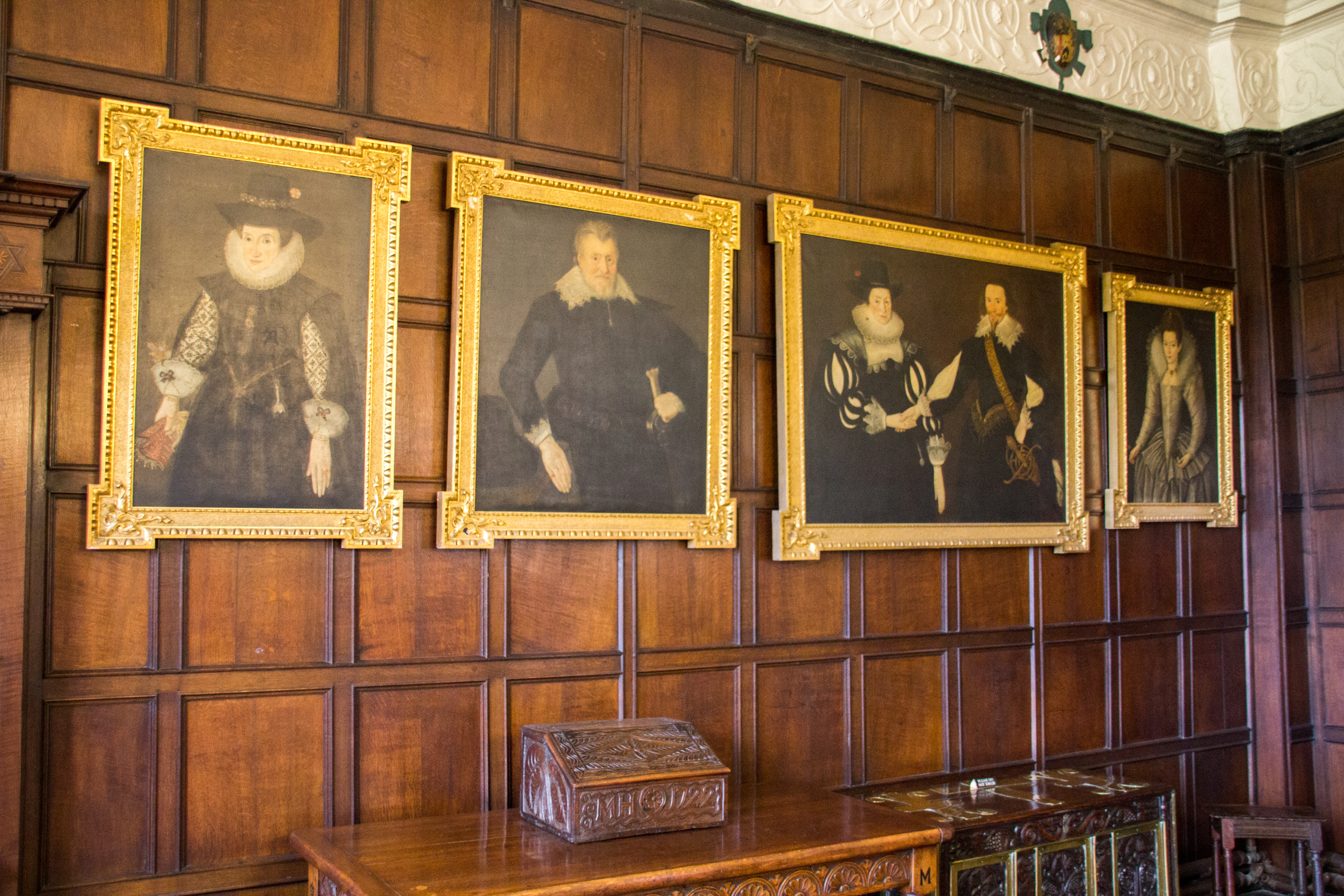
The Davenport portraits at Bramhall Hall

She was a daughter of John Warren of Poynton (died 1587) and his wife Margaret Molyneux (died 1617), and married William Davenport of Bramhall Hall.

A bed at Bramhall Hall was hung with curtains embroidered by Dorothy Davenport in worsted or crewel wool thread. The scenes of the story of Adam and Eve gave the name to the room, the "Paradise Room", which survives. Dorothy worked on the curtains between 1610 and 1636.

She embroidered this inscription for the frieze or valance that runs around the bed:

Feare God and sleepe in peace, that thou in Chryste mayeste reste, To passe from dayes of sinne and rayne with Him in blisse, Where angells do remayne, And blesse and prayse His name with songs of joy and hapinese, And live with Him for ever. Therefore, O Lord, in thee is my full hope and trust, that thou wilt me defend from sinne, the worlde and divil: Who goeth about to catch poor sinners in their snare and bringe them to that place where greef and sorrows are. So now I end my lynes and worke that hath beene longe to them that doe them reade, in hope they will be pleased, by me DORITHY DAVENPORTE 1636.

The inscription has elements of bedtime prayers and the verbal formulae of wills, and evokes an equivalence between sleep and death. The bed was a part of the refashioning of Bramall Hall and the image and reputation the Davenport's hoped to foster.

The initials W.D:D.D for William and Dorothy Davenport also feature on the bed curtains with the dates 1610 and 1614. In the 19th-century, the bed was bought by William Bromley-Davenport, a member of the Bromley-Davenport family, and taken to Capesthorne Hall where it is preserved.
