= The Establishment: And How They Get Away with It =

2014 book by Owen Jones

The Establishment: And How They Get Away With It
- First edition
- Author: Owen Jones
- Language: English
- Subject: Politics
- Published: 2014
- Publisher: Allen Lane
- Publication place: United Kingdom

The Establishment: And How They Get Away With It is a non-fiction book published in 2014 by the British writer and political commentator Owen Jones. In it, Jones describes relationships between different groups which he believes form the British Establishment. He explains the links between these groups and their purported common interest in promoting right-wing ideals, while often claiming to serve the public.

== Summary ==
=== Chapter 1 - The Outriders ===
In this chapter, Jones discusses think tanks and groups which function to push the Overton Window, including the Institute of Economic Affairs, the Center for Policy Studies, the Adam Smith Institute and the Taxpayers' Alliance. Jones claims that these are all groups that pose as non-partisan grassroots organisations but that actually have an agenda to push right wing policies. They receive funding from and contain many members with links to the Conservative Party.

=== Chapter 2 - The Westminster Cartel ===
This chapter discusses the political system in Britain and how it has changed over the years. It discusses the revolving door between politicians in the UK and big business, quoting for example, that 46% of the most profitable companies in Britain have an MP on their board of directors or as a shareholder. It discusses the Church of England's relationship with British politics, and claims that many decisions made in parliament financially benefit the MPs that make the decisions, quoting a Daily Mirror report that at least 40 MPs stood to gain financially from changes made in privatising the NHS.

=== Chapter 3 - Mediaocracy ===
This chapter discusses the British Media, and its relationship with both the outriders discussed in the first chapter, and the politicians discussed in the second. Jones claims that the wealthy people that control much of the press have interests closely aligned with the establishment, and therefore tend to promote the establishments views, rather than the views of their readers, saying, "The British people are not being served by a media that exists to inform them, to educate them, to understand the realities of the country they live in and the world around them. Instead, much of the media is a political machine, lobbying for the often personal objectives of their owners. The media and political elites are frequently deeply intertwined, sharing as they do many of the same assumptions about how society should be run and organised."

=== Chapter 4 - The Boys in Blue ===
This chapter discusses the British police force and their role within the establishment. It discusses a number of incidents which involved the police including Plebgate, the Hillsborough disaster and the News International phone-hacking scandal, and uses these incidents to highlight the complex relationships the police have with the media and politicians, and how these are often at odds with the 'policing by consent' model that the British police adopt. Jones claims that due to recent political changes which effectively privatise and incentivise areas of the police force "Britain faces the prospect of police forces policing by consent of their shareholders rather than their communities."

=== Chapter 5 - Scrounging off the State ===
This chapter discusses the establishment's relationship with The State. It describes how recent governments have been privatising previously public services, including the NHS, by following free-market ideologies, whilst at the same time, the establishment demonises benefits fraud and makes cut-backs and imposes austerity measures on those at the bottom of the financial pyramid. Jones points out what he believes to be a contradiction in this position, where big business rely on the state to provide infrastructure, education to their workers, and also to subsidise their low wages with income and housing benefit relief. Jones calls this a form of "socialism of the rich".

=== Chapter 6 - Tycoons and Tax Dodgers ===
This chapter discusses how big businesses in Britain avoid paying tax. It gives several examples of companies who have complex systems set up to avoid tax, and it discusses how the big accounting firms give advice to the government on the drafting of their tax laws and then use this information to advise their clients on how to avoid paying tax. It discusses how these practices are legal but cost the country huge amounts of money. It contrasts this with the other end of the financial scale where people on low income convicted of benefits fraud are jailed, despite the amounts in question being a fraction of those lost to big businesses avoiding tax. Jones also discusses the difficulties in imposing effective legislation to combat tax avoidance in a global marketplace.

=== Chapter 7 - Masters of the Universe ===
This chapter discusses the financial sector, which Jones claims is a threat to British democracy. Jones discusses how the role of the City has changed over the years and talks about the bailout of the banks in 2008 and the subsequent quantitative easing employed to revitalise the financial sector at the expense of taxpayers. Jones also discusses the PR companies that represent the financial sector and their close relationship with politicians and the media. For example, he discusses the top financial publicity firm the Brunswick Group, "When Brunswick founder Alan Parker got married in 2007, his wedding guests included then Prime Minister Gordon Brown – whose wife Sarah was a Brunswick partner – and David Cameron. Brown is godfather to Parker's son, while Parker and Cameron holidayed with each other in South Africa in March the following year. At the beginning of 2008 – just months before financial calamity struck – Brown appointed Brunswick's CEO Stephen Carter as his Chief of Staff. Parker's sister, Lucy Parker, is a Brunswick partner who, after David Cameron entered Number 10, headed up the government's taskforce on Talent and Enterprise. Brunswick has gone fishing for talent in the Murdoch empire, too: one senior partner is David Yelland, former editor of The Sun."

=== Chapter 8 - The Illusion of Sovereignty ===
This chapter discusses the British establishments relationship with America and with the EU and how that has changed over time. It discusses historical events which have shaped Britain's special relationship with America. It also discusses Britain's relationship with the EU and how that represents a different dynamic with regard to what British people regard as The State and The Establishment.

=== Conclusion - A Democratic Revolution ===
Here, Jones gives a broad summary of the preceding chapters and the complex relationships between the groups which make up the establishment, and how through common interest rather than any sort of organised conspiracy, it has become a vehicle to serve the rich and powerful. He then goes on to give a number of examples of groups and ideas which aim to improve the system by challenging the systems described elsewhere in the book, stating that people should be working towards a "democratic revolution".

For example, he describes the work of think tanks such as Class and The New Economics Foundation; activist groups such as UK Uncut's work on forcing politicians and media to deal with tax avoidance by big business and wealthy individuals; the Occupy movement highlighting inequality; anti-austerity campaigners such as Disabled People Against Cuts, the People's Assembly (of which Jones himself is involved) and The Green Party. Jones claims that these disparate groups need to organise to form a coherent and credible alternative to the current status quo which resonates with a mass audience.

Jones then goes on to describe some proposals which he believes would help to reassert the democracy which he claims has been lost in modern Britain. Some of these are: Higher top rates of tax; "Democracy in the workplace", citing co-determination - Germany's model of employee representation within company board meetings; A system of "democratic public ownership" of key utilities such as railways, electricity companies and banks; laws to shut the revolving door of politics including banning MPs from taking up second jobs.

He calls for the government to adopt an "industrial policy based on an active, interventionist state" but explains that this does not represent a "statist" model as has been seen in the past, but rather a new model whereby taxpayers have representation and ownership within the systems they pay into.

== Reception ==
In The Guardian's "Writers pick the best books of 2014", several authors added The Establishment to their top lists. Shami Chakrabarti praises the authenticity of Jones' voice, stating, "at a time when politicians aspire to be pop stars and vice versa, it is refreshing that a genuine political writer and thinker can achieve such popular appeal". Naomi Klein also praises the "bracing and principled" book and adds it to her top list for the year. Matt Haig said Jones' book is a "convincing look at the vested interests that thwart democracy".

Paul Staines, reviewing for The Spectator, opined that the book would be better titled as The Consensus: And How I Want to Change It. He praised that Jones was self-aware enough to know that some would see him as "The Establishment" due to his Oxford University background and work for The Guardian, but criticised how his definition of an establishment was based on his personal objections, calling the history sections of the book "the least illuminating". Another correspondent for the magazine stated that the front cover had been demeaned by a quote from Russell Brand calling Jones "this generation's Orwell" due to Brand's reputation for "outrageous hyperbole".

Alex Massie of The Daily Telegraph gave the book two stars out of five, also being put off by the Orwell comparison on the cover. Like Staines, he felt that the book was describing "The Consensus", which would not have been the title as "Establishment" sounds more ominous. Massie pointed out that Jones stated that the "Establishment" had begun with the economists Friedrich Hayek and Milton Friedman, but it was tenuous to link them to such other events mentioned in the book such as the Hillsborough Disaster. In addition, he criticised Jones's "pedestrian" solutions of renationalising utilities and imposing higher taxes; however, he concluded that Jones's view that corporate interests were taking priority over national interests was one that most people share.

== See also ==
- G. William Domhoff
