= Listed buildings in Hazel Grove and Bramhall =

Hazel Grove and Bramhall are towns in the Metropolitan Borough of Stockport, Greater Manchester, England. The towns, together with the village of Woodford, contain 30 listed buildings that are recorded in the National Heritage List for England. Of these, one is listed at Grade I, the highest of the three grades, one is at Grade II*, the middle grade, and the others are at Grade II, the lowest grade. Most of the listed buildings are houses and associated structures, farmhouses and farm buildings. The other listed buildings include churches and lych gates, and two war memorials.

== Key ==
Grade	Criteria
I	Buildings of exceptional interest, sometimes considered to be internationally important
II*	Particularly important buildings of more than special interest
II	Buildings of national importance and special interest

== Buildings ==
Name and location	Photograph	Date	Notes	Grade
Bramall Hall; 53.37400°N 2.16660°W		14th century	A country house, later much altered, it is timber framed on a stone plinth, with some brick, and has a stone-slate roof. The house is mainly in two storeys, and has an H-shaped plan, consisting of a central five-bay range with cross-wings projecting by three bays. In the main range, the upper floor are jettied, there are gables over the first two bays, and the fourth bay is a two-storey polygonal bay window with gablets. Most of the windows are mullioned and transomed, there is much decorative timber framing, and the gables have carved bargeboards and finials. On the south wing is an octagonal bellcote.	I
Old Hall Farmhouse; 53.33228°N 2.16884°W	—	16th century	The farmhouse is timber framed on a stone plinth with wattle and daub infill, and later additions in brick, rendered at the rear, and with a 20th-century tile roof. There are two storeys and four bays, the first bay being a gabled cross-wing with a jettied upper floor and gable. The windows are mullioned and transomed, and in the fourth bay is a porch.	II
Thatched Cottage; 53.37233°N 2.12353°W	—	16th century (possible)	A cottage with a cruck frame, rendered brick walls, and a thatched roof. It consists of a single room, open to the roof. There is a central door with a small window to the left, a three-light casement window to the right, and small windows elsewhere. Inside is a closed cruck truss.	II
Garden wall, New Hall Farmhouse and Cottage; 53.32961°N 2.15835°W	—	1630	The wall encloses the garden to the north and east of the buildings. The oldest part is in brick, and the stone part has a datestone of 1701. The brick wall has a rounded coping and contains a gate. The stone part has semicircular copings.	II
New Hall Farmhouse and Cottage; 53.32942°N 2.15832°W		1630	The farmhouse and cottage are in brick on a stone plinth, with stone dressings, quoins, and a stone-slate roof with a coped gable. The house has a T-shaped plan, two storeys with attics, and two bays, the left bay projecting with a gable. The doorway has a moulded surround and a Tudor arched lintel, and above it is a richly carved panel. The windows are mullioned and transomed with hood moulds, and on the roof of the right bay is a gabled dormer.	II*
Barn southeast of New Hall Farmhouse; 53.32910°N 2.15805°W	—	Mid-17th century	The barn is in brick with stone quoins and has a stone-slate roof. There are three bays, an outshut at the front right, and a later left bay. It contains a central cart entry and vents.	II
Benja Cottage; 53.36037°N 2.16415°W		17th century	A timber framed house, partly replaced by brick, with a thatched roof. It has two storeys, two bays, and a 20th-century cross-wing on the right. There is a 20th-century porch, and the windows are casements. Inside, most of the timber framing has survived.	II
Crocus Cottage; 53.36031°N 2.16458°W		17th century	A timber framed house on a stone plinth, much replaced by brick, with a 20th-century tile roof. It has two bays, an attic, a rear outshut, and a two-bay 20th-century extension. There is a casement window, a later dormer window, and much timber framing internally.	II
Deanwater House, rear wing 53.33464°N 2.18582°W	—	17th century	Originally a barn, later part of a hotel, it is timber framed with brick nogging, partly replaced in brick, and has a slate roof. There are four bays, a 20th-century porch, and wings at the rear. The windows are casements, there is a 20th-century dormer window and two loft hatches.	II
Lane Side Farmhouse; 53.34623°N 2.17933°W	—	17th century	A timber framed farmhouse with cruck trusses, on a stone plinth and with a thatched roof. There is one storey with an attic, the windows are casements, and there is a gabled dormer. The farmhouse has two full cruck tresses, and inside is an inglenook and a bressumer.	II
Moor Farm; 53.34666°N 2.16675°W	—	17th century	A farmhouse and shippon, later a private house and garage, both with stone-slate roofs. The shippon is the older, it is timber framed on a brick plinth. On the front are inserted garage doors, there is a blocked doorway, and the rear has been rebuilt in brick. The house dates from the 18th century, and is in brick with a double-depth plan, two storeys, two bays, a central porch, mullioned and transomed windows on the ground floor and casement windows above.	II
Old Timbers; 53.36295°N 2.16550°W		17th century (or earlier)	A timber framed house with brick cladding, partly rendered, and a 20th-century tile roof. There are two storeys, a T-shaped plan, and three bays, the third bay forming a gabled cross-wing, a lean-to at the rear and a 20th-century garage on the right. Inside is a closed cruck truss, timber framed partitions, an inglenook and a bressumer.	II
Peartree Cottage; 53.34574°N 2.17723°W	—	17th century	A timber framed cottage with a thatched roof, largely rebuilt in brick, and extended in the 20th century. It has one storey and attics, three bays, a small extension to the right, and a flat-roofed extension at the rear. In the first bay are two casement windows with an eyebrow dormer above, the middle bay has a door and a casement window, and in the third bay is a horizontally-sliding sash window and an eyebrow dormer above.	II
Torkington Hall Farmhouse; 53.38021°N 2.10203°W	—	17th century	The farmhouse was extended and altered later, mainly in the 19th century. It is basically timber framed, now mainly in brick and rendered, and with a roof of slate and stone-slate. The house has an irregular plan, two storeys, a symmetrical front of three bays, and two unequal gabled wings at the rear. In the centre of the front is a Gothic porch, and the outer bays have gables with ornate pierced bargeboards. The windows are mullioned and transomed with casements.	II
Barn northeast of Old Hall Farmhouse; 53.33315°N 2.16806°W		1660	The barn is in brick on a stone plinth, and includes a shippon, haylofts, and stables. There are opposing cart entries, three rows of vents, loft hatches, and a datestone. The barn has been converted for residential use.	II
475 Chester Road; 53.34084°N 2.16654°W	—	Late 17th century	A small rendered cottage, probably timber framed, with a thatched roof. It has one storey, two bays, and a small extension to the left. The windows are casements.	II
Stocks; 53.37417°N 2.16684°W		18th century (probable)	The stocks are in the quadrangle of Bramall Hall and consist of stone posts with replaced timber foot restraints. The posts have rounded heads and grooves for the restraints.	II
387 and 385 (part) Chester Road; 53.34500°N 2.15564°W	—	Late 18th century	A brick house with a roof of stone-slate at the front and slate at the rear, it has two storeys and three bays. On the front is a porch, and the windows are casements.	II
The Council House; 53.37780°N 2.11151°W	—	c. 1820	A house, later used as offices, it is in brick on a stone plinth, bands, and a slate roof. There are two storeys with a basement, fronts of five and four bays, a rear wing and a wing on the left. The central bay on the front is recessed and contains a porch with two pairs of unfluted Ionic columns with a triglyph frieze, and a door with a fanlight. The outer bays are pedimented, and the windows are sashes. At the rear is a full-height canted bay window.	II
Beech House, coach house and railings 53.37783°N 2.11422°W		Early 19th century	A brick house and attached coach house on a stone plinth with a slate roof. The house has a double-depth plan, two and three storeys with attics, and three bays. The central doorway has a semicircular arch and an ornate fanlight, and the windows are sashes. At the rear the central bay rises to a third storey with a round-headed stair window and a circular attic window. The coach house to the right has two elliptical-headed doorways, a door with an elliptical fanlight, a lunette, and a gable with an oeil-de-boeuf window. The front garden has ornate cast iron gates and railings.	II
St Thomas' Church, Hazel Grove; 53.37615°N 2.11603°W		1833–34	A Commissioners' church, the chancel was lengthened in 1907, and there were extension to the west later in the century. The church consists of a nave, a chancel and a west tower. The tower has three stages, angled buttresses, a clock opening, and an embattled parapet with corner pinnacles. There are more pinnacles on the body of the church, the windows are lancets, and inside there are galleries on three sides.	II
Christ Church, Woodford; 53.33775°N 2.17341°W		1841	The porch was added in the 19th century and the vestry in 1938. The church is in brick on a stone plinth, and has a slate roof with coped gables and ball finials. It consists of a nave and chancel under one roof, extensions to the south, and a west tower. The tower has diagonal buttresses, a doorway with a chamfered surround, clock faces, round-headed bell openings, and an embattled parapet with corner pinnacles. The windows are mullioned and transoms.	II
Lych gate, Christ Church, Woodford; 53.33799°N 2.17351°W		1878	The lych gate is at the entrance to the churchyard. It consists of brick side walls on a stone plinth with stone dressings, corbelled eaves, a heraldic shield, and a slate roof with coped gables with ball finials.	II
East Lodge; 53.37412°N 2.16088°W		1884	A lodge to Bramall Hall, it has some timber framing but is mainly in brick painted to resemble timber framing, and it has a tile roof. The lodge has an irregular cruciform plan, two storeys, and a jettied upper floor and gables with have bargeboards. The porch is in the angle, and the windows are casements.	II
West Lodge; 53.37325°N 2.16980°W		1884	A lodge to Bramall Hall, it has some timber framing but is mainly in brick painted to resemble timber framing, and it has a tile roof. The lodge has a T-shaped plan, 1½ storeys, and a jettied upper floor and gables with bargeboards and finials. The windows are casements.	II
St Michael's Church, Bramhall; 53.36335°N 2.16412°W		1909–10	The church was extended in 1960–63 by George Pace. It is built in red Cheshire sandstone, with a tile roof, and a concrete tower clad in brick. It consists of a nave, north and south aisles, a chancel with an organ loft, a vestry and a sacristy, and a west tower with flanking lobbies roofed in copper. The tower has splayed corners, it contains large windows, it has a flat roof with a parapet, and is surmounted by a timber gabled bellcote.	II
Lych gate, St Thomas' Church, Hazel Grove; 53.37619°N 2.11502°W		1916	The lych gate is at the entrance to the churchyard. It has dwarf stone walls, a timber frame and a slate roof. There are four posts on each wall, and two slatted gates.	II
Bramhall war memorial and wall 53.36008°N 2.16435°W		1921	The war memorial stands in a memorial garden and is in Portland stone. It consists of a Cross of Sacrifice with the sword in bronze, about 4 metres (13 ft) tall on an octagonal plinth, with two-stepped foot and a two-stepped octagonal base. The plinth is carved with an inscription and flowers, below which are plaques, the ones on the front and rear with inscriptions, and the others with the names of those lost in the two World Wars. At the front of the garden is a low stone wall with square piers.	II
War memorial, gates walls and railings, Hazel Grove; 53.37913°N 2.12042°W		1923	The war memorial is in a garden, it is in stone, and consists of a floriated Latin cross on an octagonal plinth on three steps. On the plinth is an inscription and the names of those lost in the First World War. There is a separate slab with corresponding inscriptions for the Second World War, and all are enclosed by a kerbed border with railings. The gates, gate piers and railings at the entrances to the garden are included in the listing.	II
Castle House; 53.37198°N 2.16107°W		1926	A house, later used for other purposes, in pebbledashed and roughcast brick, with stone-slate roofs and coped gables. It has a T-shaped plan, a central two-storey tower, and single-storey angled wings radiating from it. In the angle is a porch with a wide moulded opening and a gable with diapering. The left wing has a basement and contains a canted bay window. The right wing is longer, it contains a similar bay window and two dormers with hipped roofs.	II
