= John Hawke =

John Hawke may refer to:

- Sir Anthony Hawke (John Anthony Hawke, 1869–1941), English politician and judge
- Johnny Hawke (1925–1992), Australian rugby league footballer
- John D. Hawke Jr. (1933–2022), U.S. Department of Treasury official

== See also ==
- John Hawk (disambiguation)
- John Hawkes (disambiguation)
- John Hawks (disambiguation)
- St. John Hawke, fictional character from the American television series Airwolf
