= Robert Platt (philanthropist) =

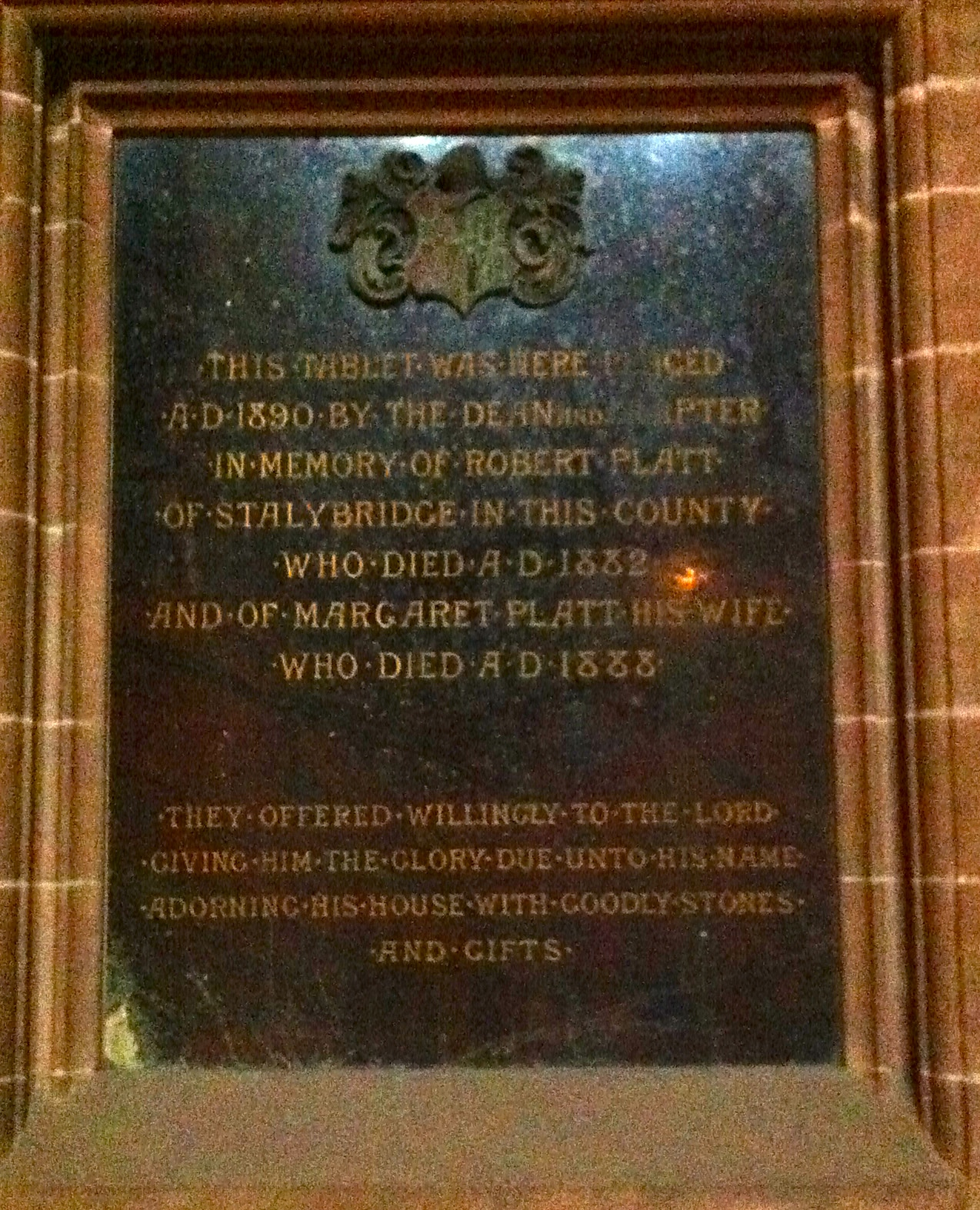
Memorial to Robert Platt in Chester Cathedral

Robert Platt (11 November 1802 – 13 June 1882) was born in Stalybridge, Cheshire, the son of cotton manufacturer George Platt and his wife Sarah. He was educated in Chester, and entered the family firm as a clerk and manager at the Bridge Street Mill, Stalybridge. On the death of his father in 1831 he assumed sole control of the business. In 1839 he married Margaret Higgins of Salford, daughter of William Higgins. in 1839. He expanded his business by the extension of the Bridge Street Mills and the construction of Quarry Street Mills. After acquiring Albion Mills, Platt moved to "Woodlands" on Mottram Road, Stalybridge.

Platt was well known for philanthropic activities in Stalybridge and Manchester, being a patron of the arts, a supporter of the Stalybridge Mechanics Institute and local churches. In December 1857 Platt and his wife were honoured by their workforce with a tea party and presentation at Foresters' Hall. His other charitable work included bequests to Chester Cathedral and donations to Owens College. A portrait of Robert Platt is today in the possession of the University of Manchester

His best known act of philanthropy was the gift of the Stalybridge Public Baths to the town, which opened on 7 May 1870. On 6 February 1871 a pair of sculptures by the artist John Warrington Wood were unveiled at the baths. The white marble busts of Mr and Mrs Platt cost £200 and were funded by public subscription from the inhabitants of Stalybridge. Accepting them on behalf of the town for placement in the Public Baths given to the town by the Platts, the Mayor stated that they were "beautiful models of the generous donors." Alderman Kirk said that although they were "very good specimens of art" the bust of Mrs Platt was perhaps "not so good a likeness as the other, but taking them together they did very great credit to the sculptor."

Robert Platt acquired a house at "Dean Water" in Woodford, Cheshire. He was granted arms by the College of Arms. His arms are described:

BLAZON: Per fesse dancettee Argent and Gules a pale and three frets, one and two, countercharged
CREST: A demi wolf Gules, semee of plates, armed and langued Azure holding in the dexter paw a wreath Argent and Gules
MOTTO: Labitur et labetur

Today, the Platts are commemorated by a blue plaque at "Woodlands". and the marble busts are in the possession of the Astley Cheetham Art Gallery.

In 1892, the Royal National Lifeboat Institution (RNLI) received the sum of £700 from the executors of the estate of the late Mrs Margaret Platt. The funds provided a new 38-foot self-righting lifeboat for Pwllheli Lifeboat Station, which was duly named Margaret Platt of Stalybridge (ON 330).

When the Pwllheli lifeboat was replaced 6 years later in 1898, the new 38-foot Watson-class lifeboat would also be named Margaret Platt of Stalybridge (ON 418).
