= Owen Jones =

English columnist and activist (born 1984)

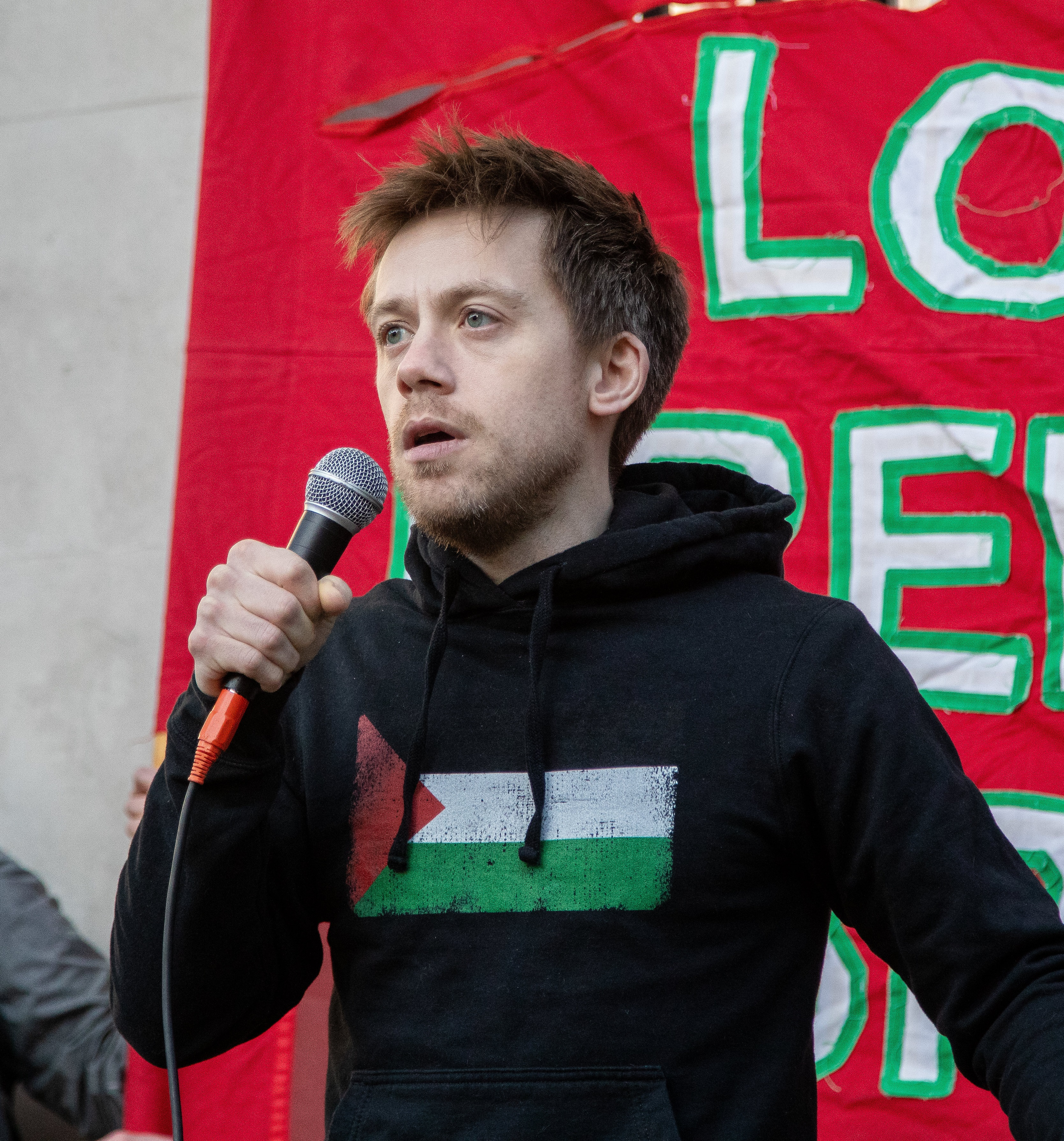
- Jones in 2024
- Born: 8 August 1984 (age 42); Sheffield, South Yorkshire, England
- Education: University College, Oxford (BA, MSt)
- Occupations: Columnist; author
- Political party: Labour (1999–2024)
- Mother: Ruth Aylett
- Writing career
- Subjects: Palestine; Democratic socialism; Advocacy journalism; Left-wing politics; Trade unionism
- Notable works: Chavs (2011); The Establishment (2014); The Alternative (2019); This Land (2020)
- Owen Jones's voice Recorded June 2014

Owen Jones (born 8 August 1984) is an English newspaper columnist, author and left-wing political activist. He writes a column for The Guardian and contributes to the New Statesman, Tribune, and The National and was previously a columnist for The Independent. He has two weekly web series, The Owen Jones Show and The Owen Jones Podcast.

== Early life and education ==
Jones was born in Sheffield and raised in Stockport, where he attended Bramhall High School and Ridge Danyers Sixth Form College. He read History at University College, Oxford, and graduated in 2005. His mother is British computer scientist Ruth Aylett and his father, Robert Jones, was a union organiser. They met through their membership in the Militant tendency, a Trotskyist group within the Labour Party. Robert Jones developed prostate cancer, and died in 2018.

Before entering journalism, he worked as a trade union lobbyist and a parliamentary researcher for the Labour Party MP John McDonnell. At one point, he was also hired by the historian Eric Hobsbawm to index and archive his papers.

== Career ==
Jones is a weekly columnist for The Guardian after switching from The Independent in March 2014. His work has appeared in the New Statesman, the Sunday Mirror, Le Monde diplomatique and several publications with lower circulations. He writes from a left-wing perspective.

Jones published his first book in 2011, Chavs: The Demonization of the Working Class, dissecting cultural stereotypes of the British working-class as boorish and anti-social "chavs". The book was selected by critic Dwight Garner of The New York Times as one of his top 10 non-fiction books of 2011, and reviewed by MP Jon Cruddas. He was awarded Journalist of the Year in 2012 at the Stonewall Awards, along with The Times journalist Hugo Rifkind. Jones' second book, The Establishment: And How They Get Away With It, was published in September 2014.

He was awarded the Young Writer of the Year prize in February 2013 at the Political Book Award and donated half the £3,000 prize money to support the campaign of Lisa Forbes, a Labour parliamentary candidate, and the other half to Disabled People Against Cuts.

He delivered the Royal Television Society's Huw Wheldon Memorial Lecture in November 2013, Totally Shameless: How TV Portrays the Working Class.

While discussing the Pulse nightclub shooting during a Sky News live television newspaper review on 12 June 2016, he walked out when host Mark Longhurst maintained that the shooting was carried out against "human beings trying to enjoy themselves, whatever their sexuality". Jones maintained that the attack was a homophobic hate crime.

Jones published This Land: The Struggle for the Left on 24 September 2020. Jones was interviewed by Huck about the book. The book received a negative review from British trade unionist Len McCluskey, and was praised by Melissa Benn in the New Statesman: "Owen Jones has managed to produce a whodunnit political page-turner and a surprisingly fair account (given that Jones was a player in the Corbyn circles)".

Jones has a YouTube channel which, as of October 2026, has 888,000 subscribers.

In November 2025, Jones was sued for libel by BBC Middle East editor Raffi Berg, after publishing an article titled BBC's Civil War Over Gaza on Drop Site News in December 2024. In the article, Jones accused Berg of "playing a key role in a wider BBC culture of 'systematic Israeli propaganda'". In a preliminary ruling in March 2026, the High Court ruled that Jones expressed an opinion in his article and supported that opinion by citing examples of Berg's actions.

== Political activism ==
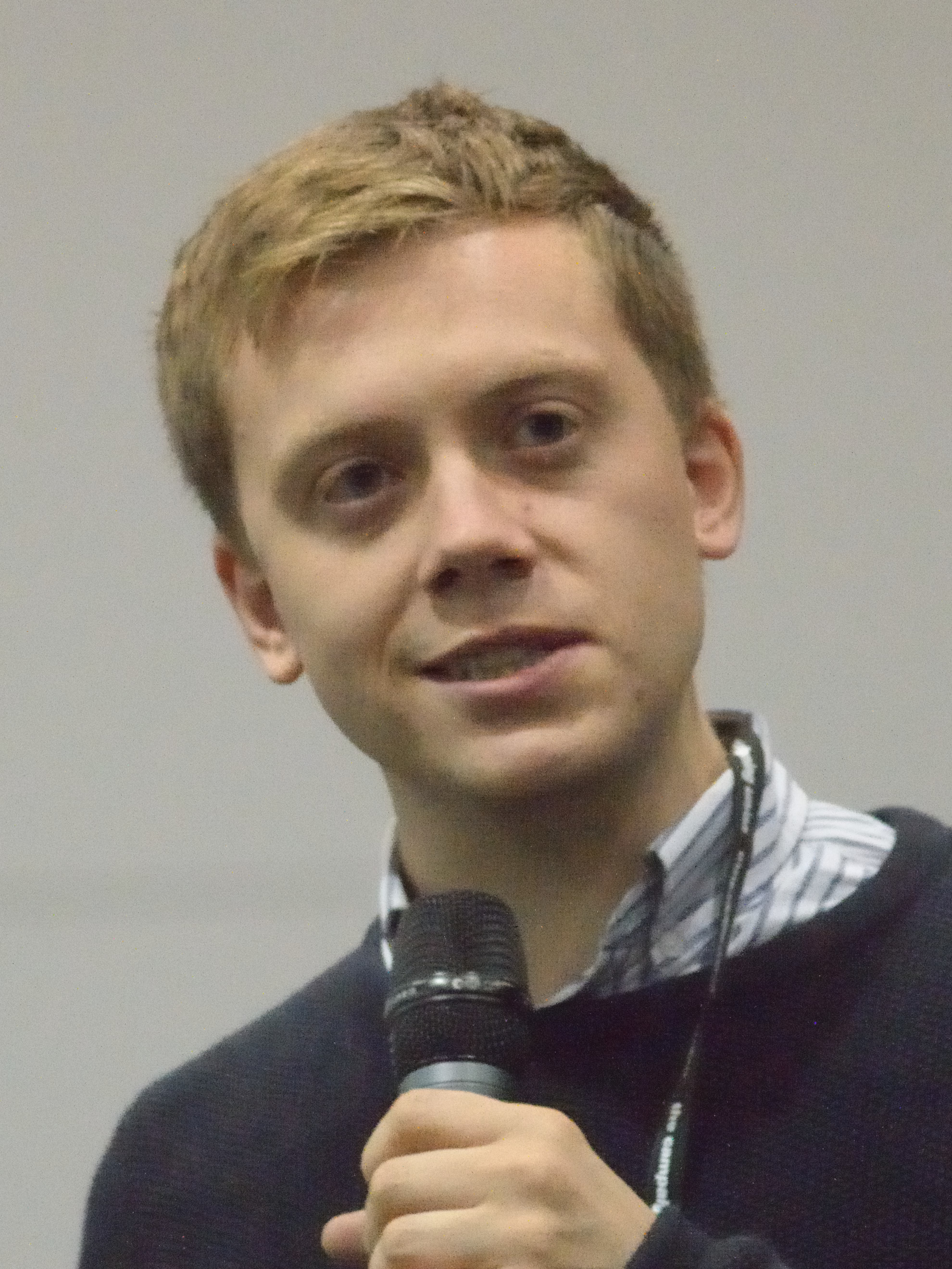
Jones in 2016

Jones spoke at a press conference to launch the People's Assembly Against Austerity on 26 March 2013, and regional public meetings in the lead-up to a national meeting at Central Hall Westminster on 22 June 2013.

He was awarded an honorary degree of Doctor of the University (DUniv) by Staffordshire University in 2015 in recognition of his campaigning on social inequality. Jones supports abolishing the monarchy of the United Kingdom. He has spoken out about transphobia and LGBTQ rights. In August 2019, Jones and some friends were attacked outside a North London pub. All the perpetrators were convicted, with the judge at Snaresbrook Crown Court ruling that the attack was carried out because of Jones's sexuality and political views.

He is a former member of the Labour Party, having held membership of the party since the age of 15 and cancelling his membership in March 2024. In his reasoning for leaving the party, Jones stated that it had become "a hostile environment" for those that support the policies based on which party leader Keir Starmer won his leadership, which Starmer had since rejected, such as scrapping university tuition fees and support of public ownership. Jones also criticised the Labour Party's rejection of a cap on bankers' bonuses and its opposition to a wealth tax, among other issues. Jones has at times been critical of Jeremy Corbyn's leadership of the Labour Party. In a March 2017 column for The Guardian, he argued that Corbyn's leadership was "clearly failing" and warned that Labour risked electoral defeat under his stewardship.

He supported We Deserve Better, a group which campaigned against Labour in favour of Green and independent candidates in the 2024 United Kingdom general election.

The New Statesman named Jones 45th in The Left Power List 2024, the magazine's "guide to the 50 most influential people in progressive politics", noting that his "future influence will hinge on the electoral performance of the non-Labour left".

He endorsed Zack Polanski during his run in the 2025 Green Party of England and Wales leadership election.

== Personal life ==
Jones is gay and registered a civil partnership in September 2024 with a Brazilian doctor. Jones has ADHD.

== Books ==
- Chavs: The Demonization of the Working Class. Verso Books. 2011. ISBN 978-1-78168-398-9.
- The Establishment: And How They Get Away with It. Penguin Books. 2014. ISBN 978-0-14-197499-6.
- The Alternative: And How We Build It. Penguin Books. 2019. ISBN 978-0-241-25396-0.
- This Land: The Story of a Movement. Penguin Books. 2020. ISBN 978-0-241-47094-7. (originally published as This Land: The Struggle for the Left)
- The Fall of the West: How They Really Lost It. Penguin Books. 2026. ISBN 978-1-80206-868-9.
