= Hawkesiophyton =

Scientific classification
- Kingdom: Plantae
- Clade: Embryophytes
- Clade: Tracheophytes
- Clade: Spermatophytes
- Clade: Angiosperms
- Clade: Eudicots
- Clade: Asterids
- Order: Solanales
- Family: Solanaceae
- Genus: Hawkesiophyton; Hunz.

Genus of flowering plants

Hawkesiophyton is a genus of flowering plants belonging to the family Solanaceae. It is also in Solanoideae subfamily, Tribe Solandreae Miers and also Subtribe Juanulloinae.

Its native range is southern Tropical America. It is found in the countries of Bolivia, Brazil, Colombia, Ecuador, Honduras, Panamá, Peru and Venezuela.

The genus name of Hawkesiophyton is in honour of Jack Hawkes (1915–2007), a British botanist, Mason Professor of Botany at the University of Birmingham. It was first described and published in Kurtziana Vol.10 on page 39 in 1977.

Known species, according to Kew:

- Hawkesiophyton ochraceum (Cuatrec.) A.Orejuela & C.I.Orozco
- Hawkesiophyton ulei (Dammer) Hunz.
