= Trevor Williams (plant geneticist) =

British plant geneticist (1938–2015)

John Trevor Williams (21 June 1938 – 30 March 2015) was a British plant geneticist who was instrumental in the creation of plant gene banks.

He was executive secretary and then first director at the International Board for Plant Genetic Resources (IBPGR) in Rome and made major contributions towards conserving the genetic resources of the world's food crops. His work led to the setting up of the Svalbard Global Seed Vault known as the 'Doomsday Vault', part of the international network of gene banks.

== Early life and education ==
Born in Thingwall, on 21 June 1938, he attended Moseley Hall Grammar School and went up to Selwyn College, Cambridge to study botany, graduating in 1959. He went on to complete a Ph.D. (1962) at Bangor University supervised by John L. Harper, on "Studies on the biology of weeds with special reference to the genus Chenopodium L.". He taught at Goldsmiths College. He then went to ETH Zurich as a research fellow where he was awarded a D.Sc. for his study "The nitrogen relations and other ecological investigations on wet fertilized meadows" supervised by Heinz Ellenberg. He returned to the UK as lecturer at Lanchester Polytechnic. He was elected to the Council of the British Ecological Society in 1970 for 4 years.

== Career ==
He joined the botany department at the University of Birmingham in 1969 as the course tutor for the M.Sc. course in the Conservation and Utilization of Plant Genetic Resources created by Jack Hawkes. He served the Botanical Society of the British Isles, Warwickshire Nature Conservation and the Birmingham Natural History Society. He was elected a fellow of the Linnean Society of London.

He was Executive Secretary and then first director from 1976 to 1990 at the International Board for Plant Genetic Resources (IBPGR) in Rome. He was seconded for 2 years in 1976 to IBPGR as Genetic Resources Officer/Senior Genetic Resources Officer in the Crop Ecology and Genetic Resources Unit of the Food and Agriculture Organization of the United Nations (FAO) in Rome. When he was appointed Executive Secretary of IBPGR in 1978 he resigned from the University of Birmingham. IBPGR was funded by the Consultative Group on International Agricultural Research (CGIAR) to advance the conservation of plant genetic resources at a time when traditional crop varieties where in danger of being lost. Under his leadership IBPGR helped set up programmes to conserve plant genetic resources, including sponsoring over 800 collecting trips and setting up gene banks. From 1985 he was Executive Secretary of European Cooperative Programme for Plant Genetic Resources (ECP/GR).

He left IBPGR (now Bioversity International) and moved to Washington, D.C. where he was director of the International Fund for Agricultural Research (IFAR) and IBPGR-sponsored Tropical Trees Program (TTP). He was an advisor on 'Diversity' (published by Genetic Resources Communications Systems) and was a founder member of the International Centre for Underutilised Crops. In the 1990s, he helped to organize the International Network for Bamboo and Rattan (INBAR).

He was awarded the Jubilee Medal (1977) from the National Agrarian University, Lima, Peru; a Certificate of Honour for Scientific Excellence from the Royal Government of Thailand (1984) and Certificate of Commendation, Argentina Agricultural Veterinary Academy for services to maize breeding in Latin America (1984). He was an honorary professor at the University of Birmingham (1984).

== Personal life ==
He died at his home on 30 March 2015, after a long respiratory illness. His funeral was held at St Chad’s Church, Handforth.

== Legacy ==
He left a bequest for Bangor University to support agricultural botany.

== Selected publications ==
Crop Genetic resources of the Far East and the Pacific. J.T. Williams, J.L. Creech. (1981). International Board for Plant Genetic Resources.

Crop Germplasm Conservation. D. L. Plucknett, N. J. H. Smith, J. T. Williams. (1983). Science doi:10.1126/science.414-b

A Bibliography of Crop Genetic Resources. Hawkes J.G., Williams J.T., Croston E.P. Rome: International Board for Plant Genetic Resources, 1983.

Practical Considerations Relevant to Effective Evaluation. In A.H.D. Brown, O.H. Frankel. D.R Marshall, and J.T. Williams, eds. (1989) The Use of Plant Genetic Resources. Cambridge: Cambridge University Press.

Base-collections of Crop Genetic Resources: Their Future Importance in a Man-dominated World. Kar-Ling Tao, J. Trevor Williams, Dick H. van Sloten. (1989). Environmental Conservation 16(4):311-316 JSTOR 44521200

Plant Genetic Resources: Some New Directions. Williams, J.T. 1991. Advances in Agronomy 45:61-91.

Conserving the Tropical Cornucopia. (1991). Nigel J. H. Smith, J. T. Williams, Donald L. Plucknett. Environment Science and Policy for Sustainable Development 33(6):7-32 doi:10.1080/00139157.1991.9931401

Tropical Forests and Their Crops. Nigel J. H. Smith, J. T. Williams, Donald L. Plucknett, Jennifer P. Talbot. (1992). Cornell University Press. JSTOR j.ctv1fxmjg

Global research on underutilized crops. An assessment of current activities and prospects for enhanced cooperation. Williams JT, Haq N (2002) International Centre for Underutilized Crops, Southampton
