= Aylett (name) =

Aylett is a given name and surname. Notable people with the name include:

== Given name ==
- Aylett Hawes (1768–1833), American politician and planter
- Aylett Hawes Buckner (1816–1894), American politician
- Richard Aylett Buckner (1763–1847), American politician
- Aylett R. Cotton (1826–1912), American politician
- Aylett Sammes (c. 1636 – c. 1679), English antiquary

== Surname ==
- Allen Aylett (1934–2022), Australian rules football player and administrator, dentist
- Bill Aylett (1900–1976), Australian politician
- Charley Aylett (1913–1966), Australian politician
- Kurt Aylett (born 1992), Australian rules footballer
- Robert Aylett (1583–1655), English lawyer and religious poet
- Ruth Aylett (born 1951), British computer science professor
- Steve Aylett (born 1967), English author
