= Chavs: The Demonization of the Working Class =

2011 book by Owen Jones

- First edition
- Author: Owen Jones
- Audio read by: Leighton Pugh
- Language: English & Dutch
- Genre: media studies, sociology
- Publisher: Verso
- Publication date: 2011
- Publication place: United Kingdom
- Media type: Print
- Pages: 304
- ISBN: 9781844678648
- OCLC: 668194635
- Dewey Decimal: 305.5620941
- LC Class: HD8391 .J66

Chavs: The Demonization of the Working Class is a non-fiction work by the British writer and political commentator Owen Jones, first published in 2011. It discusses stereotypes of sections of the British working class (and the working class as a whole) and use of the pejorative term chav. The book received attention in domestic and international media, including selection by critic Dwight Garner of The New York Times as one of his top 10 non-fiction books of 2011 in the paper's Holiday Gift Guide and being long-listed for the Guardian First Book Award.

The book explores the political and economic context for the alienation of working-class Britain. It references the impact of British government policy from the Thatcher era onwards and how it has been used as a political weapon to disenfranchise the working class, dismantle societal structures designed to support the working class – such as unions – and pit working class communities against each other.

It was published in Dutch in 2013, translated by Charles Braam.

== Impact of Thatcherite Reforms on Trade Unions ==
Taylor & McDonald claim that in late 20th century Britain, Margaret Thatcher’s neoliberal reforms began cracking down on the economic stability of Britain’s working class.

One of the prime aims of the reforms was to reduce the perceived strength and influence of trade unions on the economy by a combination of incremental labour marketplace and legal adjustments （Taylor & McDonald, 2022. p.21）

When economic and political deterioration deepened, undermining of working-class influence transformed expectations around control and regulation of industry, and job ownership, and control of labour processes (Taylor & McDonald, 2022. p.22)

Deregulation, privatisation and a smaller state represented a complete break from the Keynesian period after the war. Unions are held responsible for the economic woes of the country since the late 1960s (Taylor & McDonald, 2022. p.27)

Breaking union solidarity was crucial and the voluntary redundancy schemes did that（Taylor & McDonald, 2022. p.34）

== Voluntary redundancies ==
Voluntary redundancies have benefited employers due to shifts in salary levels for less desirable wage groups or older age groups (Taylor & McDonald, 2022. p.33)

Heavy payoffs spurred workers to flow away in bits and pieces from locations like Liverpool docks, giving up collective action for individual departures. Yet, framed as personal choice, these deals ravaged organised labour networks that had protected workers’ livings（Taylor & McDonald, 2022.p. 38-39）.

When others opt voluntarily for redundancy, others view them as traitors among staff who continue opposing the policy, splitting a section of workers. The function of trade unions has also been undermined by respecting individual choice (Taylor & McDonald, 2022, p. 34) Nevertheless, it is necessary to consider how numerous of such schemes are inherently voluntary (Taylor & McDonald, 2022. p. 33)

== Industrial Decline ==
Under Thatcherite Britain, history surrounding deindustrialization tended to redirect blame from systemic economic policies toward the alleged moral deficiencies of labor and unions. According to Tomlinson(2021. p. 627), the precipitous decline of industrial jobs during 1979–81 resulted primarily from an unwilled effect of monetarist policies, such as a steep increase in the exchange rate that ravaged export-oriented industries . Instead of blaming the crisis on such structural forces, though, the government portrayed the crisis as a product of workers' obduracy and anachronistic ways. This “moral economy” explanation made unemployment acceptable for Thatcher's government by portraying it as a mere correction for decades of overmanning and inefficiency (Tomlinson, 2021. p. 627).

The British Leyland case is an exemplary case in point. Though it had thousands of employees, the motor firm had to cope with minimal assistance. Its difficulties were consistently explained by labour indiscipline, not by poor management or insufficient investment. The government’s hesitant funding was not for systemic transformation but for preventing immediate political repercussions (Tomlinson, 2021. p. 631). In rhetoric and policy, blame for neoliberal reforms was shifted from the workforce towards a discourse of individual failure rather than structural causation.

== Media Stereotyping and the Cultural Demonisation of the Working Class ==
Imogen Tyler contends that demonising of the white working class, for instance, by figures such as the "chav," coincided with growing economic disparity within Britain. As economic divides widened, cultural portraits more and more stigmatised working-class identity as coarse and menacing, solidifying class divides by media-driven contempt and mockery (Tyler, 2008, p. 21, 30–31).

The inversion that updated moral flaws in the working class and a cultural backwardness was carried out for the purpose of justifying neoliberal policies. According to Jones, the media and politicians increasingly blamed the poverty on the persons, not systemic injustice. The “chav” stereotype turned complex issues into punchlines, reinforcing class prejudice, For example, the classic Joke about "When the Woolworth closed down, where the Chav buy their Christmas presents".

Tyler present media that representations of chavs, particularly women, were normalised to exclude(Tyler, 2008. p. 26). “Chav mums” were labelled promiscuous and irresponsible, fuelling policies that policed welfare and motherhood. Caricatures made disgust into a basis for policy, weaponized disgust to make moral judgments.

Media outlets sympathetic to neoliberalism, particularly those owned by Rupert Murdoch, amplified these narratives. Taylor & McDonald(2022, p. 29)claim an example, The Sun consistently presented trade unions as outdated and obstructive, while celebrating Thatcher’s reforms as modernising forces. This discursive shift helped normalise the erosion of working-class power, making class contempt an acceptable form of humour or satire by the 1990s.

Television also contributed to the popularisation of the chav figure. Characters such as Vicky Pollard from Little Britain encapsulated chav stereotypes—loud, aggressive, unintelligent, and hypersexualised. Lockyer(2010, p. 127)argues that these portrayals are not innocent forms of humour but rather play a role in legitimising class-based ridicule and reinforcing social hierarchies. The comedic framing of such characters masks their function as vehicles of symbolic violence, enabling middle-class audiences to laugh at, rather than confront, structural inequality.

The combined effects of economic restructuring and cultural stigmatisation have left deep and lasting impacts on Britain’s working class (Walker & Roberts, 2017. p. 11). While neoliberal policies may have modernised segments of the economy, they also produced widespread job insecurity, regional decline, and a pervasive sense of social exclusion. Walker & Roberts (2017, p. 1) think that many working-class individuals continue to struggle with economic marginalisation, compounded by media portrayals that deny them dignity and legitimacy.

Nevertheless, some working-class men (Lockyer, 2010. p. 116-117) have attempted to reconstruct masculine identity in alternative forms—through care work, education, or community service. Yet their capacity to do so is constrained by limited access to cultural and economic resources, as well as the persistence of deeply entrenched stereotypes. The demonisation of the working class thus remains a central, unresolved issue in contemporary British politics and society.

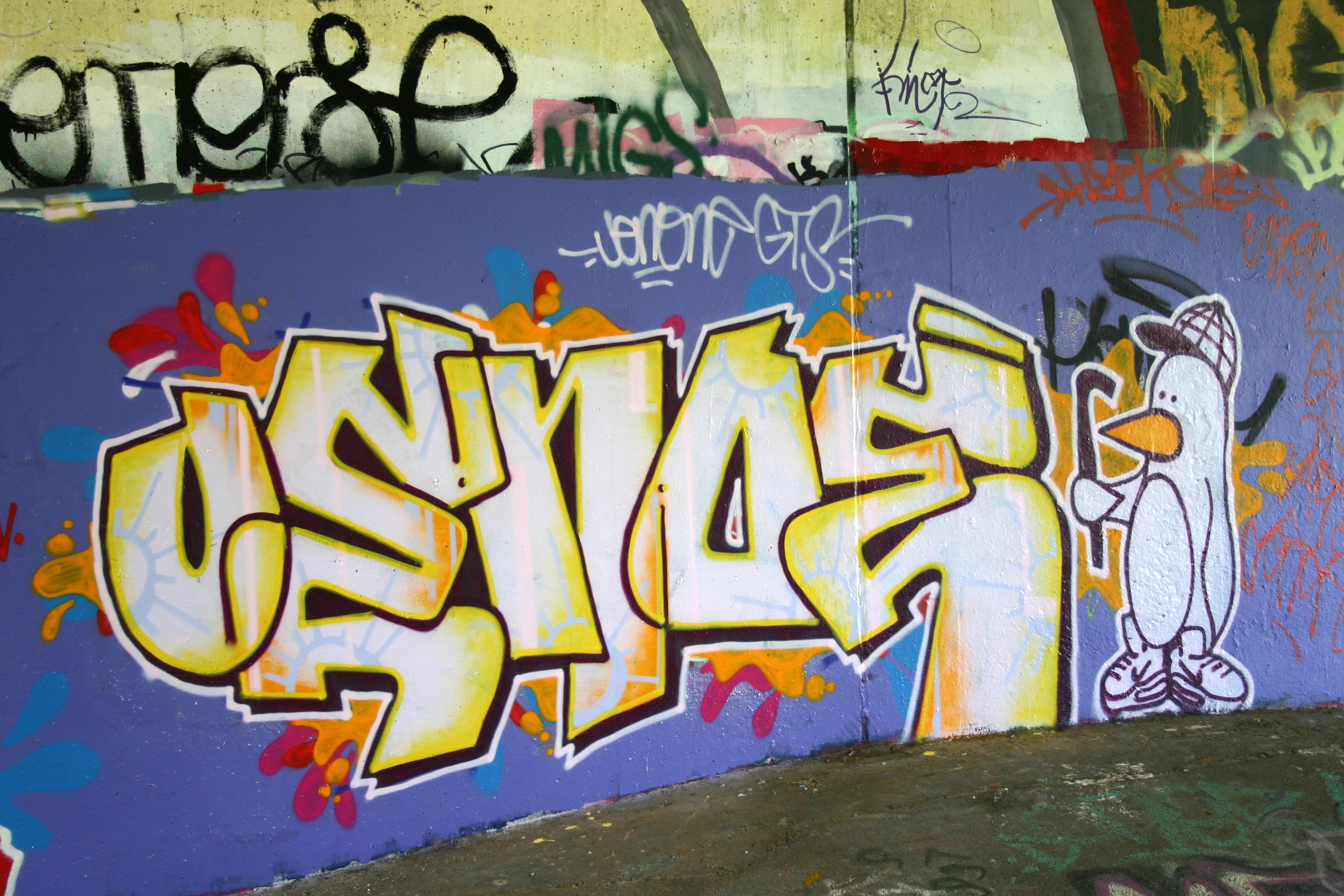
Chav Penguin designed by stereotype

== The “Chav” Stereotype ==
By the influence of neoliberalism also harmful and reductive classifications of the working class in modern British society have taken place. Often enough, they level out the structural reason for poverty and inequality by representing them as the results of personal failure or moral deficiency. As Walker and Roberts explain,working-class men are frequently cast in dualistic form: as obsolete and resistant to modernisation or as hyper masculinised, deficient of emotion and associated with criminality, violence, and ‘welfare dependency’（ Walker and Roberts 2017. p. 3）. Another example relates to how and to what extent working class life is being pathologized in mainstream media, specifically on reality television programmes—Benefits Street or The Jeremy Kyle Show. Such programming usually portrays poverty as a condition suffered by the poor due to bad lifestyle choices rather than because of structural disadvantage.

However, this framing is very classist and extremely gendered and racialized. For instance, working class white males have often been condemned for right wing populism, Brexit and xenophobic attitudes and depicted as being full of anger, entitlement, ignorance, and resentment towards multiculturalism and globalisation. The stereotype of the “lazy shirker” or “feckless father” further entrenches the notion that working-class individuals are socially deviant and resistant to self-improvement, despite evidence that many continue to uphold traditional responsibilities such as providing for their families.

These narratives serve a broader ideological purpose within neoliberal discourse: they shift attention away from structural inequality and instead blame individuals for their socioeconomic marginalisation. Such portrayals delegitimise legitimate grievances by recasting systemic exclusion as the outcome of individual moral failure. In doing so, they erode social solidarity and justify the withdrawal of welfare support and public services.

The figure of the "chav" emerged in early 2000s Britain as a potent symbol of working-class demonisation. Originally a piece of British slang applied to working-class youth—particularly those wearing branded sportswear and associated with "anti-social" behaviour. The term rapidly evolved into a broader caricature of the white working class as vulgar, criminal, and culturally deficient Rather than being defined purely by poverty, chavs are mocked for their perceived lack of taste, refinement, and ambition qualities framed as indicators of symbolic class failure.

== Pathologisation of Working-Class Identity ==
Academic analyses（Tyler, 2008. p. 25，27） have demonstrated that the chav stereotype operates as more than a matter of poor taste or vulgar fashion. According to Tyler, the chav is a racialized and gendered figure, representing a form of "failed whiteness" that contrasts starkly with respectable, middle-class norms. Particularly stigmatised is the figure of the "chav mum"—a young, working-class woman, often portrayed as overly fertile, welfare-dependent, and irresponsible. Tyler argues that this figure embodies national shame and moral panic, serving to reinforce the values of middle-class respectability by highlighting its inverse.

Online spaces such as Urban Dictionary and websites like Chavscum.co.uk played a significant role in cementing the chav stereotype. Through pseudo-dictionary entries and user-submitted content, these platforms legitimised dehumanising portrayals of working-class youth. One particularly extreme entry describes chavs as "stupid annoying arses" who "shag everything that moves" and “killed Britain” (Urban Dictionary, 2007). Such depictions reflect a broader “politics of disgust,” where class-based contempt is not only tolerated but celebrated in public discourse.

== Critical reception ==
Chavs: The Demonization of the Working Class by Owen Jones is widely regarded as a polemical intervention into contemporary British political and media discourse. The book argues that the working class has been systematically stigmatized and caricatured in public life, most notably through the figure of the "chav"—a term that has come to symbolise vulgarity, criminality, and fecklessness. Jones traces the political roots of this class demonization to neoliberal reforms initiated under Thatcherism, such as the defeat of the trade unions and the "Right to Buy" scheme, which he argues fragmented working-class solidarity and identity(Russell, John. 2012. p. 345). The book indicts both Conservative and New Labour governments for redirecting attention from structural inequality to individual moral failure, turning social exclusion into a behavioural issue rather than a socioeconomic one.

The themes John explores are supported by academic analyses such as those of Tyler and Lockyer, who examine the cultural mechanisms behind class-based contempt. Tyler conceptualises the figure of the "chav mum" (Tyler, 2008. p. 26)as a gendered and racialized object of national disgust, used to reinforce middle-class respectability by contrasting it with working-class excess. Similarly, Lockyer examines the portrayal of Vicky Pollard in Little Britain (Lockyer, 2010. 124) arguing that the character encapsulates the grotesque stereotype of the chav as ignorant, hyper-sexualised, and morally deviant, thus legitimising wider class-based ridicule. Both scholars emphasise how these comedic and media representations serve to naturalise social hierarchy and justify socioeconomic exclusion.

Despite its influence, Chavs has attracted several criticisms. Welshmen(2012. p. 650-651) note that the title is somewhat misleading, as the book focuses more broadly on the marginalisation of the working class rather than offering a detailed analysis of the chav figure itself. Furthermore, the text has been critiqued for its anecdotal tone and lack of historical and analytical depth, often prioritising structural explanations while neglecting the complex cultural dynamics within the working class. Nonetheless, the book has played a significant role in reviving debates around class inequality in post-industrial Britain and remains a key resource for understanding modern class politics.

Although Welshman rightfully criticizes Chavs for relying on anecdotalism and structural determinism, the book is still important for politicising class for a wider reading audience. Another important insight is that Jones reveals the bipartisan character of working-class marginalisation: Conservative policies during Thatcher did indeed disassemble industrial working-class lives, and yet New Labour, Jones claims, also served to legitimize middle-class dominance by stigmatising “non-aspirational” poverty. For example, he argues that since 1997 political rhetoric has pathologised poverty more and more as a matter of behaviour, and less as a structural circumstance. This ideological change served to entrench media discourses which de-legitimised working-class identity at the expense of celebrating upward mobility. In doing so, Chavs relocates class from being a relic of previous industry, into a living political and cultural faultline within neoliberal Britain.

Owen Jones’s Chavs: The Demonization of the Working Class has been amply scrutinized by scholars for its thoughtful critique of contemporary British society's pathologization and marginalization of the working class. Karen Lumsden, author of a peer-reviewed assessment published in Work, Employment and Society, commends the analytical scope of the book in charting the vilification of the working class on political, media, cultural, and industrial planes. Jones attributes the rise of the “chav” stereotype to structural shifts that were begun with Thatcherism, specifically policies dismantling collective working-class identity and advancing division through “divide and rule” tactics (Lumsden, 2013, p. 188). Examples highlighted include media handling of the case of Shannon Matthews (Lumsden, 2013. p. 32), trade union decline (Lumsden, 2013. p. 40), and increasing alienation of privileged political elites from working-class communities (Lumsden, 2013. p. 107). Lumsden points out that the book is an important intervention into class inequality debates, especially against a backdrop of austerity measures and international economic downturn.

Sheryl Bernadette Buckley, for Marx & Philosophy Review of Books, seconding Lumsden's admiration, applauds Jones for exposing how the term “chav” is a useful tool for class-based mockery. Buckley asserts that Jones successfully illustrates how working-class people have culturally been redefined—from being the “salt of the earth” of yesteryear to being depicted today as the “scum of the earth”—due to decades of neoliberalism tearing down working-class life's socioeconomic foundations. Carl Packman, reviewing for LSE Politics and Policy, concurs with this assessment, adding that Jones presents an engaging account of how Conservative and New Labour governments equally worked toward undermining working-class institutions and status and fomenting middle-class triumphalism.

While praising the strength of the book, even these reviewers observe weaknesses. Welshman argues that the book places too great an emphasis on structural considerations, overlooks cultural diversity and multiplicity within working-class life, and fails adequately to deploy historical context. Both Lumsden and Packman contend that the book fails to provide a precise definition of “social class” and a conceptual limit or demarcation for what it is describing with the term “chav” and what comprises working-class identities more generally. Buckley asserts that Jones might have responded more critically to diversity among working-class people and forms of contestation over dominant narratives. Furthermore, Lumsden criticizes the book's caricatured depiction of the middle class and points out that it occasionally suffers from choppy chapter organization (Lumsden, 2013. p. 189). Still, throughout these reviews, Chavs is cited as a passionate, timely, and provocative piece that has revived public and scholarly debates about class, stigma, and discrimination within neoliberal Britain."
