= John Hawks =

John Hawks may refer to:

- John D. Hawks, American paleoanthropologist
- John Twelve Hawks, American science fiction author
- John Hawks (architect) (died 1790), British-born American architect
- John Milton Hawks (1826–1910), abolitionist, surgeon and Florida settler

== See also ==
- John Hawk (disambiguation)
- John Hawke (disambiguation)
- John Hawkes (disambiguation)
