= John Hawk (photobiologist) =

New-Zealand born photobiologist (1942–2022)

John Lyndon McLeod Hawk (8 October 1942 – 25 December 2022) was a New Zealand-born photobiologist.

== Career ==
Hawk's early career in the UK began in neurology at St Mary's Hospital, London, before transitioning to dermatology. After further training at Guy's Hospital he joined St John's Institute of Dermatology where he worked with Ian Magnus, photobiologist and discoverer of erythropoietic protoporphyria. Hawk performed interviews and various media appearances on Magnus's behalf, and also campaigned for public awareness of the potential dangers of sun exposure.

== Personal life ==
Hawk was born in 1942 in Hamilton, New Zealand. His father, Charles, was a civil engineer. Hawk initially excelled in languages during his school years but later pursued studies in physics in Auckland and medicine in Dunedin.

In 1970, while working as a senior house officer at Green Lane Hospital, Auckland, Hawk met Scottish pediatrician Lorna Michell, whom he later married. In 1971, they relocated to the United Kingdom, where they raised two sons.

== Publications ==
- Hawk, John (2014). "Vitamin D and ultraviolet radiation exposure: a photodermatologist's viewpoint" (PDF). NIWA UV Workshop, April 2014.
- Hawk, John (2024). Sunlight and us. Chicago: Austin Macaulay. ISBN 9781035810079. OCLC 1434176755.
