= Bramall Hall =

Historic building in Greater Manchester, England

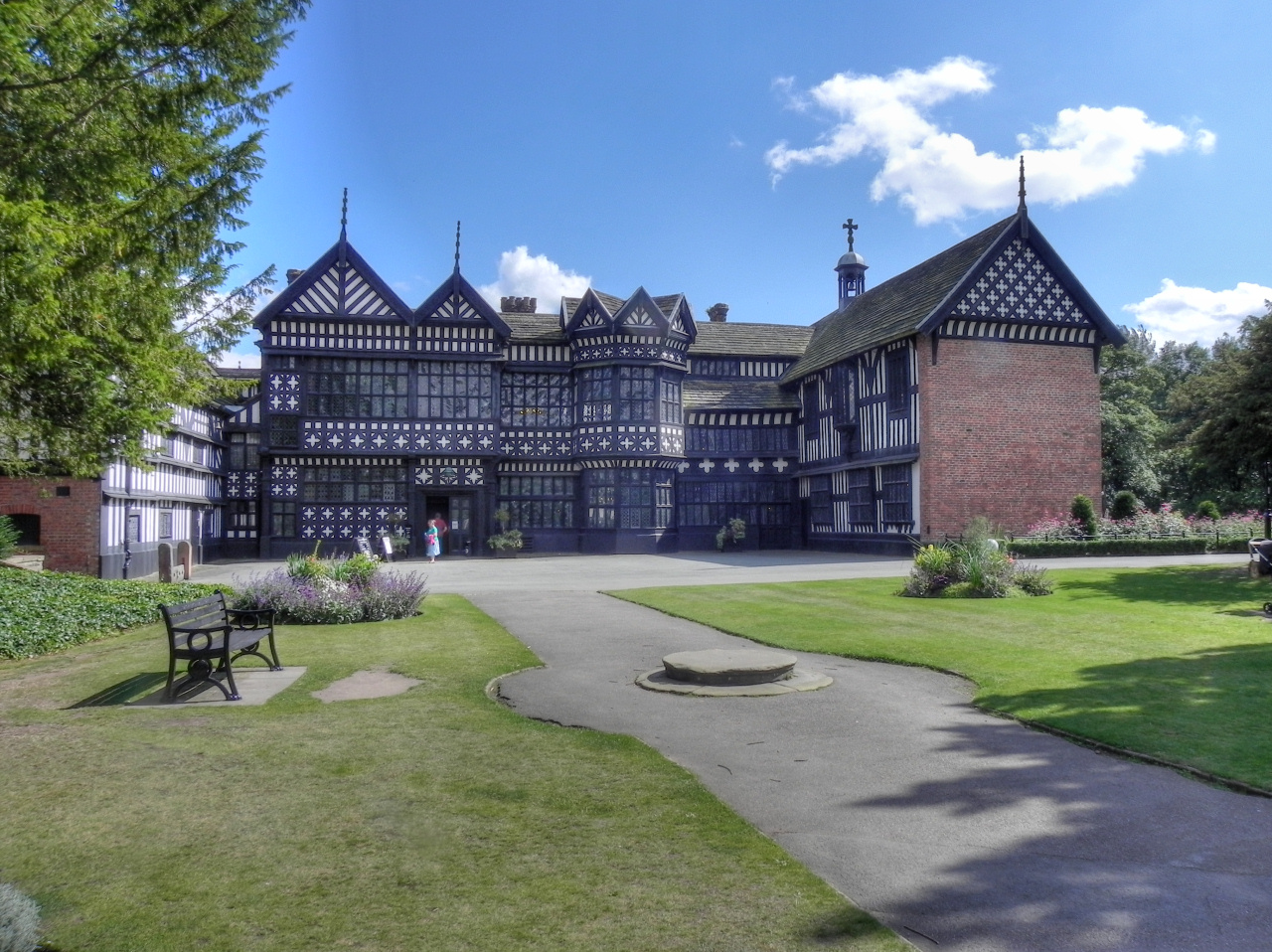
- The hall viewed from the west, the side of the main entrance. This shows the courtyard, along with the north and south wings; the Great Hall is in the centre

- Location within Greater Manchester

General information
- Architectural style: Tudor
- Location: Bramhall, Metropolitan Borough of Stockport, England
- Coordinates: 53.3740°N 2.1666°W
- Construction started: 14th century

Technical details
- Structural system: Timber framed

Website
- Bramall Hall – Stockport Council

Listed Building – Grade I
- Official name: Bramall Hall
- Designated: 9 August 1966
- Reference no.: 1260476

Bramall Hall is a manor house in the village of Bramhall, in Greater Manchester, England. Largely Tudor in design, its oldest parts date from the 14th century, with additions from the 16th and 19th centuries. It is a notable example of the timber-framed buildings found throughout the historic county of Cheshire. The house functions as a museum and its 70 acres (28 ha) of landscaped parkland (Bramhall Park) are open to the public.

The manor of Bramall was first described in the Domesday Book in 1086, when it was held by the Massey family. From the late 14th century, it was owned by the Davenports, who built the present house and remained lords of the manor for about 500 years. In 1877, they sold the estate of nearly 2,000 acres (810 ha) to the Manchester Freeholders' Company, a property company formed to exploit the estate's potential for residential building development. The hall and a residual park of over 50 acres (20 ha) was sold on by the Freeholders to the Nevill family of successful industrialists. In 1925, it was purchased by John Henry Davies and then, in 1935, acquired by Hazel Grove and Bramhall Urban District Council. Following a local government reorganisation in 1974, Bramall Hall is now owned by Stockport Metropolitan Borough Council, which describes it as "the most prestigious and historically significant building in the Bramhall Park Conservation Area."

== History ==
=== Early history ===
The name Bramall means "nook of land where broom grows" and is derived from the Old English noun brōm meaning broom, the yellow-flowered shrub common in the area, and the Old English noun halh, which has several meanings (Note: These include nook, secret place and valley.) that could refer to Bramall. The manor of Bramall dates from the Anglo-Saxon period, when it was held as two separate estates owned by the Anglo-Saxon freemen Brun and Hacun. The manor was devastated during William the Conqueror's Harrying of the North. After William subdued the north-west of England, the land was divided among his followers and Bramall was given to Hamon de Massey in around 1070.

The earliest reference to Bramall was recorded in the Domesday Book as Bramale, at which time the manor was part of the Hamestan Hundred in Cheshire. (Note: It was one of only three places described, along with Cheadle and Norbury, which lie within the modern-day Metropolitan Borough of Stockport.) While its value was 32 shillings before 1066, it was worth only five shillings by 1086.

In the first part of the 12th century, the manor passed from the second Baron of Dunham Massey to Matthew de Bromale. According to Barbara Dean, Matthew's father is said to have founded the de Bromale family, naming himself after the manor, and he may have been related to or a follower of the de Masseys; he may have also held the manor at some point. The de Bromales held the manor until 1370, when Alice de Bromale married [John de Davenport; the estate came to be held by the Davenport family until the late 19th century.

=== Early Davenports ===
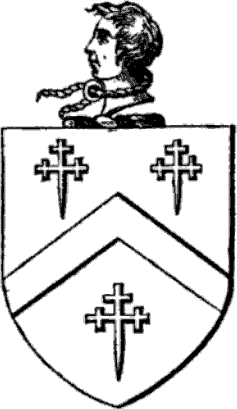
The Davenport coat of arms

The Davenports were a family of significant landowners in the north-west of England whose antecedents can be traced back to the time of the Norman Conquest. Orm de Davenport lived close to what is now Marton, in Cheshire, and his name derives from the Norman French Dauen-port meaning "the town on the trickling stream", referring to his home on the river Dane. In 1160, the family became responsible for Macclesfield Forest and, in the early 13th century, Vivian Davenport became its Grand Sergeant. The family's achievement of arms has, as the crest, a felon's head with a rope around the neck, which is said to represent the family's power over life and death during this period. The Davenports acquired land throughout the area, notably at Wheltrough, Henbury, Woodford and lastly at Bramhall through marriage.

The Davenports held the manor for around 500 years and it is likely that they built the current house after their accession. The first William Davenport was lord of the manor from 1478 to 1528, and one of the first recorded trustees of Macclesfield Grammar School. It is possible that he was heavily involved in the final battle of the Wars of the Roses at Bosworth and thereby instrumental in gaining the crown for Henry VII, who rewarded him with a pension of 20 marks per year payable for his lifetime. According to Dean, it was during this first William's tenure that Bramall may have been vandalised by a man named Randle Hassall, who destroyed all or part of nine houses and stole the timber. This gives credence to the theory that Bramall was rebuilt, replacing or partially replacing an older building.

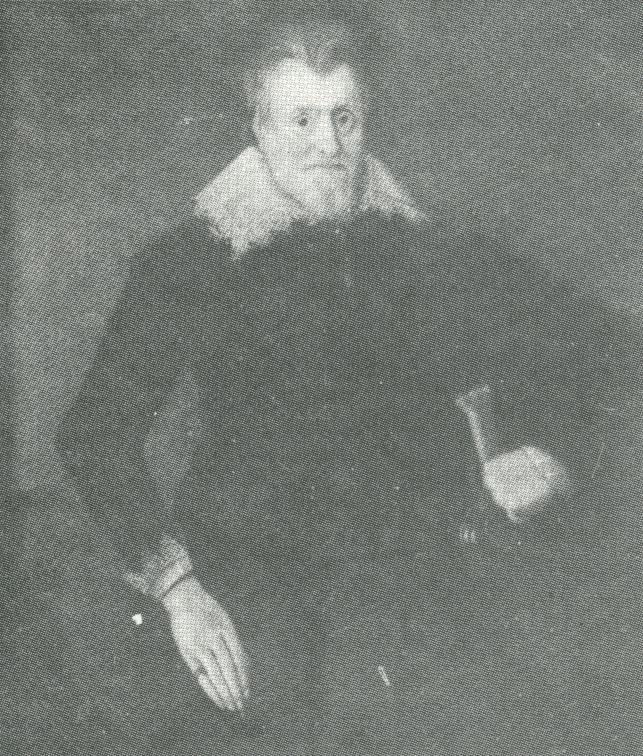
The fifth William Davenport in 1627, at the age of 65

The third William Davenport, who succeeded his father of the same name in 1541, took part in what later became known as The Rough Wooing, a series of attacks against Scotland ordered by Henry VIII. He was knighted in Scotland for his efforts at the burning of Edinburgh in May 1544. The fifth William Davenport inherited Bramall in 1585 from his father of the same name, and lived there with his wife Dorothy for over 50 years. The first marriage in Bramall's chapel was recorded in 1599, between William (aged 15), eldest son of the fifth William and Dorothy, and Frances Wilbraham (aged 11). On 22 April 1603, the fifth William Davenport was knighted by James I and VI at Newark, where the king was staying on his journey from Edinburgh to London; he later became the High Sheriff of Cheshire and a commissioner of the Hundred of Macclesfield. During the tenure of the fifth William, many alterations were made to the building, including the addition of a room above the Great Hall, which would later become the Withdrawing Room, and a long gallery. The internal decorations were also updated with additions such as wall paintings and portraits.

The sixth William succeeded his father in 1639 shortly before the English Civil War broke out. He was a Royalist, though said not to have been a particularly dedicated one. Many of his tenants became Parliamentarian soldiers and, over the next three years, he had numerous visits from Parliamentarian soldiers, mostly seeking to acquire goods such as horses and weapons for the war, and using the house for quartering soldiers. Bramall was also host to Royalist soldiers, who confiscated some of the Davenport property for use in the war. William Davenport was, at one point, charged with delinquency and ordered to pay a fine of £750 (equivalent to £150,000 in 2025); soldiers continued to use Bramall Hall because of its convenience.

=== Later Davenports ===
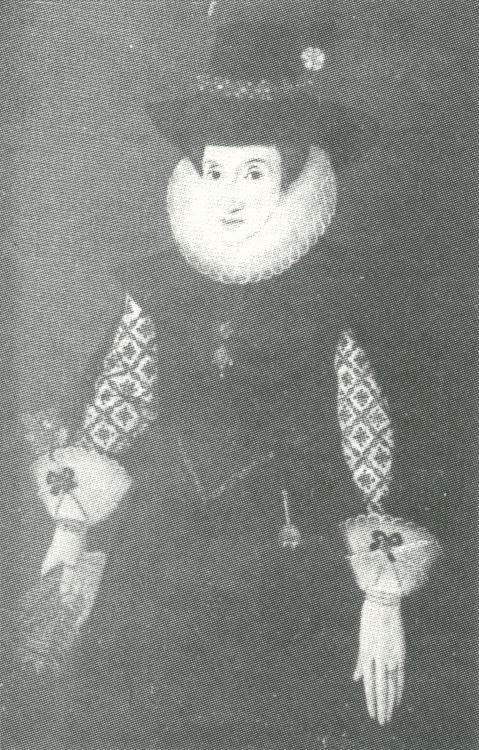
Dorothy Davenport in 1627, at the age of 66

The sixth William was briefly succeeded by his son Peter, who was followed by his son William. William the seventh's son was the eighth William Davenport, and an inventory of his property made shortly after his death in 1706 shows the gallery and gatehouse of Bramall were still intact. His two eldest sons each inherited the estate but both died young and heirless, so the estate passed to their younger brother Warren Davenport. Warren became part of the clergy and, during his tenure at Bramall, set up a school close to the entrance of the estate. The tenth and final William Davenport succeeded his father, Warren at the age of four. Many changes were made to the house during his tenure, including the dismantling of the gatehouse side of the courtyard and the long gallery; the latter may have been done because of their being considered unsafe. William had no sons, so the estate passed to Salusbury Pryce Humphreys, the husband of his illegitimate daughter Maria.

Humphreys, a naval captain, had married Maria Davenport in 1810 and lived at Bramall Hall long before he succeeded his father-in-law. He became widely respected in the Stockport area, but following his succession to the estate in 1829, there were disputes from other members of the Davenport family who claimed a right to the property. Edmund Davenport, who claimed ancestry from Thomas Davenport, the third son of Peter, unsuccessfully contested the succession in two different courts; Edmund was eventually imprisoned for failing to pay the legal fees. Humphreys was knighted in 1834 for his services and, in 1838, changed his name to Davenport, in an effort to continue the Davenport line. He moved with Maria to Cheltenham in 1841, most likely because living at Bramall had become expensive or because of health concerns. Salusbury died there four years later and was buried in Leckhampton.

Over the next decade, the house was likely to have been let, as Maria Davenport preferred to live elsewhere. Her eldest son, William Davenport, married firstly to Camilla Maria Gatt and then secondly to Diana Handley, with whom he lived at Bramall for four years before the estate was passed to him. Maria moved to London, where she lived with her youngest son, Charles, and died in 1866. During William's tenure, Bramall was regularly visited by members of the public and the Chapel continued to be used for regular services of worship. However, following his death in 1869, the property was let to Wakefield Christy of Christys & Co Hatting, therefore ending direct involvement from the Davenport family. This occurred because William's son, John, was too young to inherit the estate. John's whereabouts during Christy's seven-year tenure is unknown, though he was shown as a visitor at Bramall in 1871 and, in 1874 became the first chairman of the Bramhall School Board. In 1876, shortly before he returned to the house, he was listed as living on Ack Lane in Bramhall.

=== Later history ===
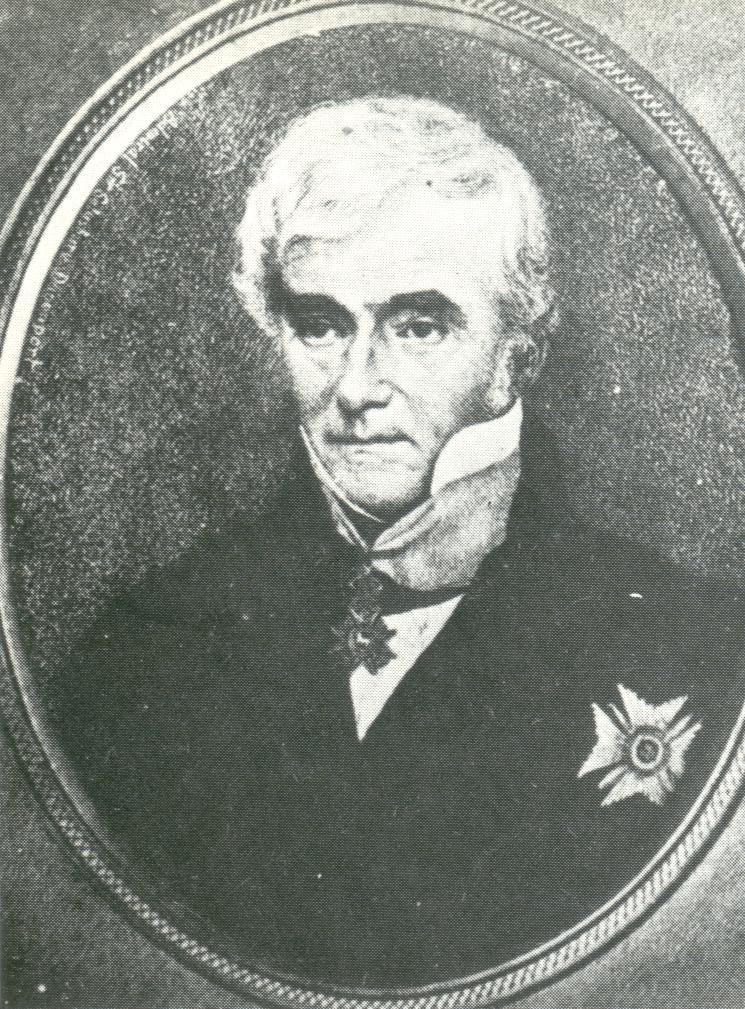
Rear-Admiral Sir Salusbury Davenport

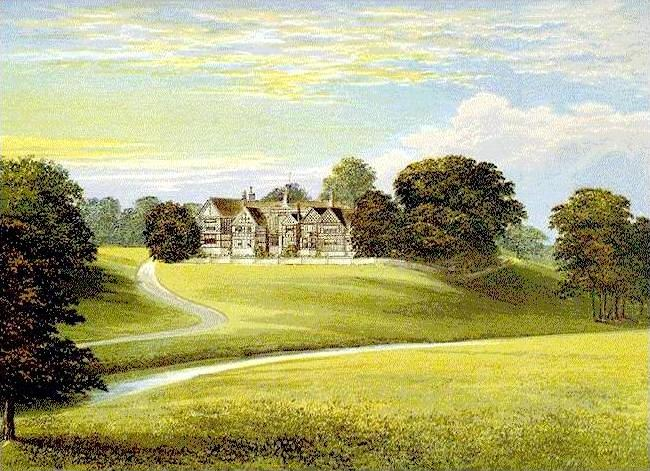
Bramall in 1880, showing the original route of the drive before its realignment in 1888

John Davenport returned to Bramall in 1876 at the age of 25 but, on 24 January 1877, it was announced that the estate was to be sold. The furniture was auctioned, while the house itself and rest of the Bramall estate, totalling 1,918 acres (776 ha), was sold to the Freeholders Company Limited, a Manchester property development firm, on 3 August 1877 for £200,000 (about £20.2 million in 2025). According to speculation, the sale was motivated by financial issues and a personal distaste of the building. It remained empty until 1882 when it was purchased by Thomas Nevill, a local industrialist whose wealth came from calico printing, for his son, Charles. While living in the house, Charles Nevill commissioned substantial restoration and remodelling, making the interior more comfortable while retaining most of the building's external features, under the direction of architect George Faulkner Armitage. The landscape of the grounds was redesigned, with a new stable was built along with a west and east lodge, housing the coachman and head gardener respectively. Another building, known as Hall Cottage, was also built in the vicinity and housed the Sidebottom family.

Thomas Nevill, Charles' nephew and adopted son, inherited the estate in 1916, but decided to sell it following financial difficulties after the First World War. In 1923, many items of furniture were auctioned off but there was no interest in purchase of the house. During that decade, rumours arose that Bramall would be dismantled and transported to the United States; this may have been popularised by the autobiography of Kate Douglas Wiggin, which described the author's visit to Bramall in 1890. In 1925, the house was auctioned, with the condition that if no purchaser came forward it would be demolished and the materials sold off. At one point, the neighbouring local authority, Stockport County Borough Council, offered to buy the estate, but Nevill rejected their offer as "unacceptable"; the auction did not provide any acceptable offers. However, one of those present, John Henry Davies, president of Manchester United, later offered £15,000 (about £788,000 in 2025) for the house; this was accepted. He lived in the house until his death in 1927 and his widow Amy remained there until 1935, when she sold it to Hazel Grove and Bramhall Urban District Council] for £14,360 (worth about £883,000 in 2025) with the intention that the house and park be open to the public.

Under council ownership, the house was occupied by a caretaker, though most of the building was open to the public. The house and grounds were used for various functions, such as the proclamation of George VI succeeding his brother King Edward VIII to the throne. At that time, the house was sparsely furnished as the council was unable to afford much furniture. One of the council's earliest projects was the restoration of the chapel, which had fallen out of use towards the end of the 19th century. It was restored to resemble how it would have been when the Davenports were last at Bramall; a service of consecration was held on 30 October 1938 once the work had been completed. In 1947, an association called the Friends of Bramall Hall was set up, primarily to find furnishings for the house, but also to advertise and assist in the upkeep of the house and grounds. Over the years, many furnishings which had once belonged to the house were returned, including portraits of the occupants. The estate is now the property of Stockport Metropolitan Borough Council (SMBC), which acquired it in 1974, following a local government reorganisation.

=== Present day ===
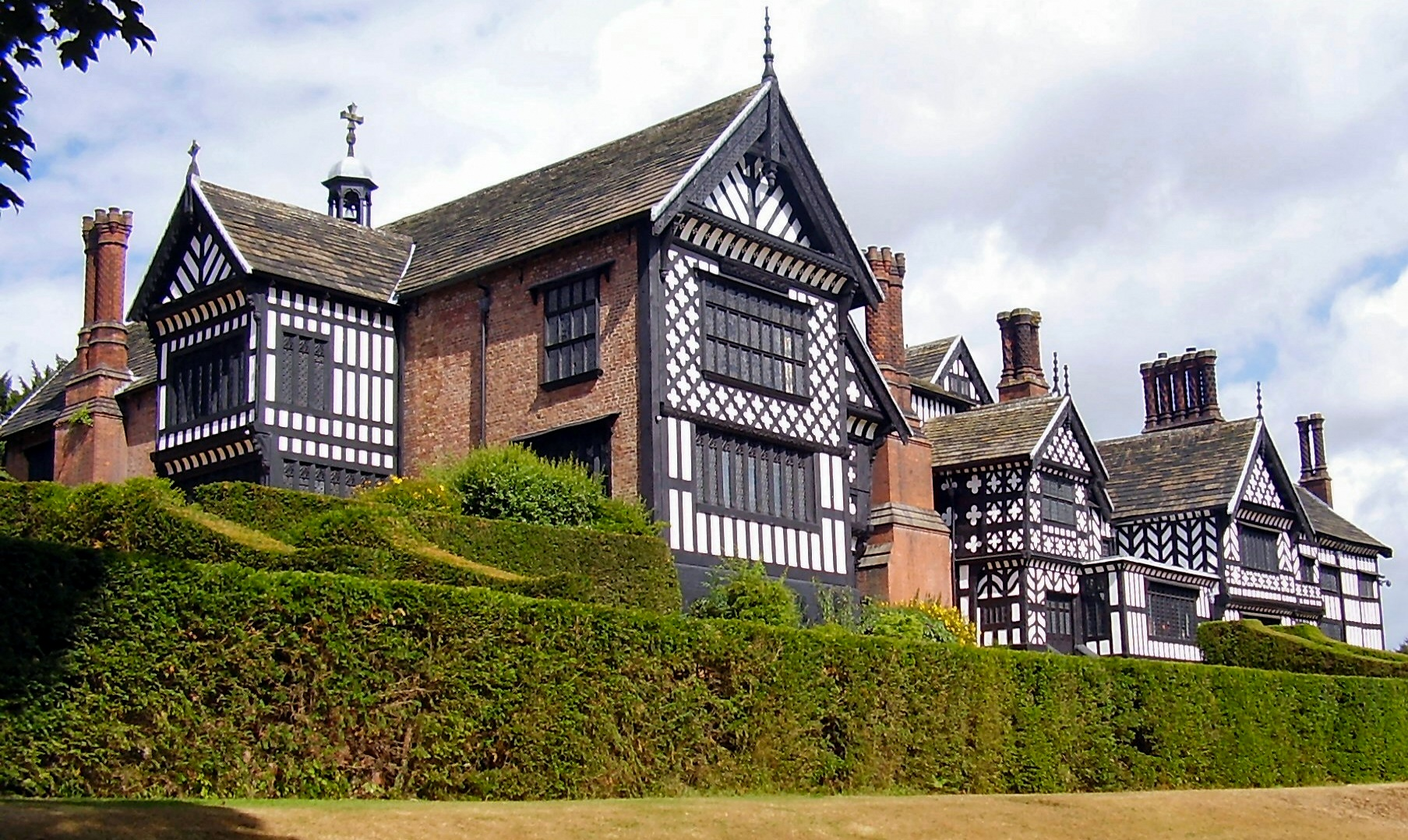
The east side of the house; the room in the centre is the chapel

The house and grounds are open to the public and are run by SMBC. Visitors may take an official tour of the house or explore it at their own pace on a self-guided basis. The public is able to wander the grounds freely at all times. Events and club meetings are held in the house and grounds throughout the year; local schools often visit to experience life in a particular era.< The house is licensed for wedding and civil partnership ceremonies, and has been used as a background for television series and films, including Prank Patrol, Cash in the Attic, Coronation Street, The Making of a Lady and The Last Vampyre.

Currently the house is named Bramall while the park is named Bramhall, though there remain some local inconsistencies. However, both have been spelt as Bramhall, Bramal and other variations over the years. The Domesday Book used the spelling Bramale, which led Charles Nevill to prefer Bramall, a convention maintained by Hazel Grove and Bramhall Urban District Council when it acquired the property. SMBC consistently refers to the hall as Bramall and the park as Bramhall.

== House ==
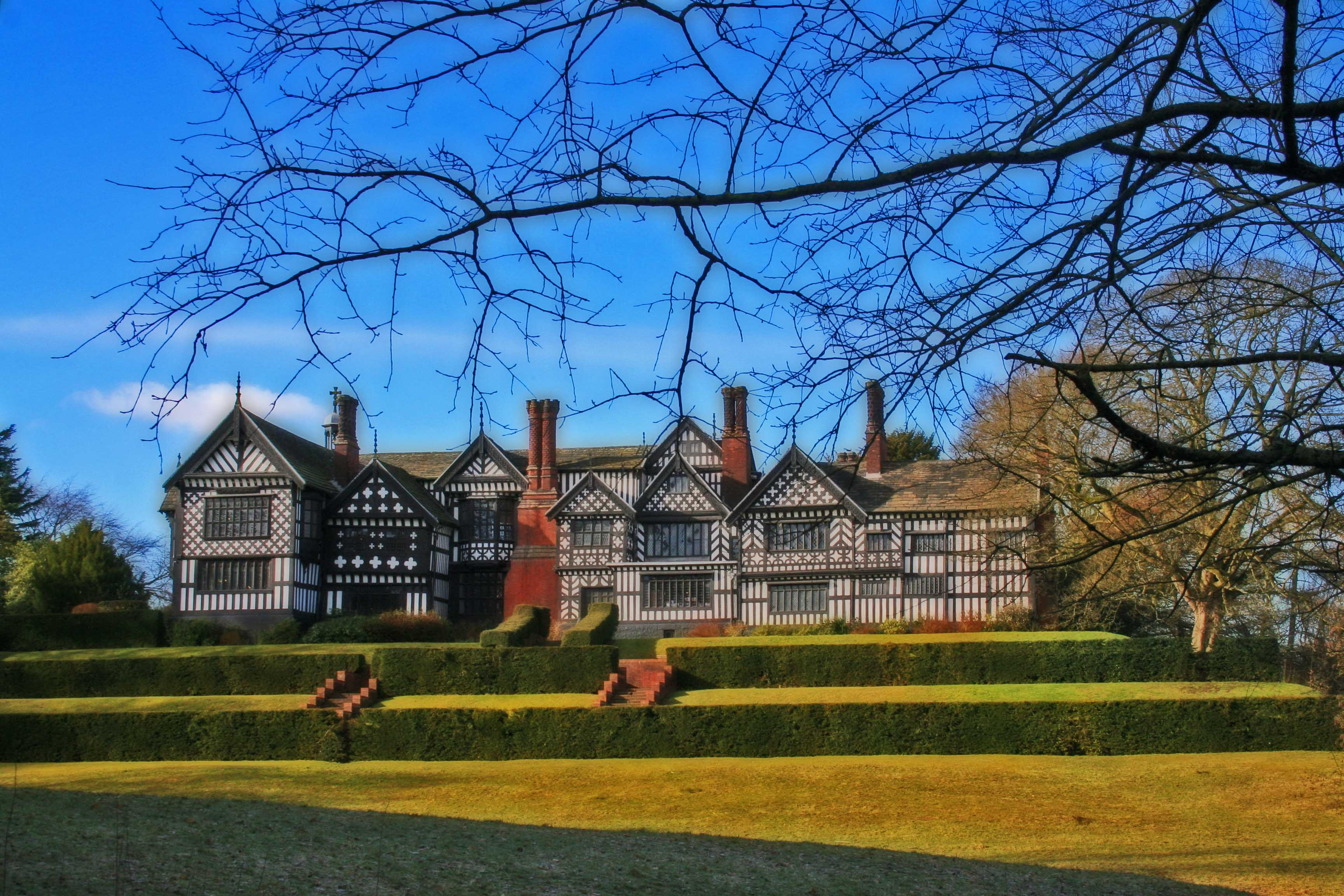
The east side of Bramall Hall

There has been a settlement at Bramhall since Saxon times. According to Alfred Burton, who wrote about Bramhall in the late 19th century, the house has not always been in the present location and was originally at Crow Holt Wood. This theory was rejected by another historian, Frederick Moorhouse, who became convinced in 1909 that Crow Holt Wood was a place where animals would have been taken to be sorted. There is no conclusive evidence to support either theory.

Today, the house has stream valleys to its south and east sides. It is a grade I listed building and the oldest parts date from the late 14th century, with later renovations dating from the 16th and 19th centuries. It was originally accessed from the east side; the drive followed the route of the Ladybrook stream, then uphill towards the chapel on the south side, reaching the courtyard on the other side. The main entrance is now on the side of the courtyard, in the west, because of the restructuring of the drive in 1888. The current layout of the house can clearly be seen from the west side of the building, in the courtyard; the service wing is on the left, the Great Hall is in the centre and the Banqueting Hall is on the right. Before the 19th century, the courtyard was enclosed by a gatehouse, which was taken down between 1774 and 1819 because of its being neither required nor in vogue.

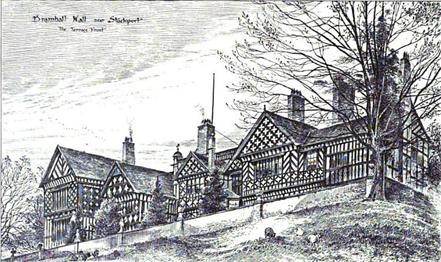
The east side of the house (1883)

The house is built with stone foundations and the main structure is made of oak timbers, joined using mortice and tenon joints and held in place with oak pegs. Wattle and daub or lath and plaster are used to fill the spaces between the timbers. The black and white appearance from the timber framing construction dates from the Tudor period, though some parts have been repaired in later years.

=== Ground floor ===
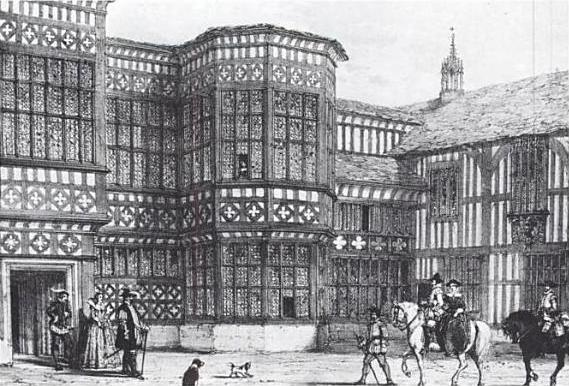
A 19th-century view imagining the courtyard at the beginning of the 17th century, showing the large bay windows of the Great Hall and Withdrawing Room

The Great Hall is the central part of Bramall Hall. As with typical great halls in the Middle Ages, this would have been the room where the business of the house, estate and its villagers was conducted as well as a communal eating room for the household. It was originally an open-roofed, single-storey building, with a fireplace situated in the middle of the floor. It was probably first built around the end of the 14th century when the Davenports became lords of the manor. Towards the end of the 16th century, the Great Hall was substantially rebuilt and the Withdrawing Room was created above it. A long gallery was also added as a third storey. The history of the gallery is uncertain; it was intact in 1790, but was taken down before 1819 because it was believed to be unsafe. A similar gallery was built at Little Moreton Hall and it is still intact, causing the lower storeys to buckle under the weight. The Great Hall has a bay window with leaded windows, common throughout the building. William Harrison Ainsworth wrote about a right of way through the Great Hall, in his 1834 novel Rookwood. He described how a traveller could pass through the Great Hall, and be entertained and sometimes refreshed. He described Bramall as "[the] best specimen of...its class, in our opinion, is the best...to be met with in Cheshire." No evidence exists for any such right of way. According to another tale, food from the buttery hatch was given to the poor who congregated outside.

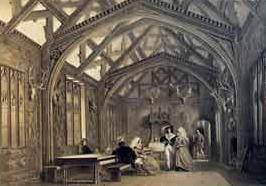
The Solar or Great Chamber of late Tudor or early Jacobean days as imagined in the 1840s

The Lesser Hall leads off the southern end of the Great Hall. Its walls are panelled with oak and the timbers that the ceiling is constructed of are decorated with cross and rose shapes dating from the Victorian era. The Banqueting Hall, which leads off the Lesser Hall to the west, is believed by Dean to be the oldest part of the house. Its northern wall is possibly the oldest part of the house, not having been renovated like the rest of the courtyard walls; the Nevills used this as a billiards room. The chapel, opposite the Banqueting Hall, was the only place of public worship in Bramhall until the 19th century. Its existence was first recorded in 1541, when it was referred to in the will of the second William Davenport. It fell into disrepair after its closure between 1869 and 1890, and was restored by Hazel Grove and Bramhall Urban District Council, following its purchase of the property in 1935, and religious services began to be held there again. On the north wall are unglazed windows which face the wall of the Library, showing that the south wing was once separate from the Great Hall. The Ten Commandments are written on the west wall. Underneath the Commandments, an older, pre-Reformation painting of the Passion is visible. Such depictions were banned during the Reformation and whitewashed over; it was not until the 20th century that efforts were made to restore Passion paintings, but very little of this particular painting survives.

=== First floor ===
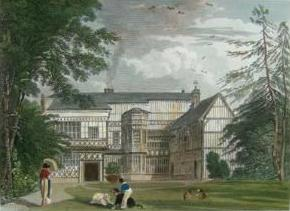
A postcard from March 1819 depicting Bramall, with its long gallery; the gallery had probably been taken down by the time the card was used

The Ballroom, also known as the Upper Banqueting Hall, has an arched roof and according to Dean likely dates from the 16th century. It contains rare 16th century wall murals, including one which according to Dean may depict the nursery rhyme "Ride a cock horse" and another along the east wall depicting a man playing a mandolin. Above the chapel is the Chapel Room, also known as the Queen Anne Room, the Priest's Room and Nevill's Room. It had been two rooms, a state bedroom and ante-room, but was almost totally transformed in the late 19th century into one larger room. A blocked-up door next to the fireplace was thought to have been a priest hole, but is more likely to have been the entrance to the first floor of the house from an external staircase before the wing was restructured, probably in the late 16th century or early 17th century.

North of the Chapel Room is the Paradise Room, whose name derives from the bed hangings which include embroidered images of Adam and Eve and their fall from paradise, as well as the use in Tudor times of the name "paradise" for a favourite room, often a bedchamber. This room has panelled walls, and a fireplace with a cupboard on the right hand side. On the other side, there is a small recess which was described in an 1882 newspaper as "a dark passage which is said to lead to some region unknown." It is possible that this was a priest's hide, adjacent to the Chapel and Chapel Room. Less romantically, it may, alternatively, have been a garderobe or privy. This room became associated with sightings of ghosts in the 19th century and legends of a secret passage that led from the room outside or to the Chapel arose, though no such passages exist.

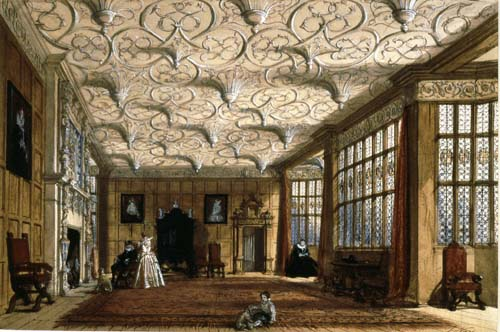
A 19th century interpretation of how the Withdrawing Room might have looked in the early 1600s

The largest room on the first floor is the Withdrawing Room, situated above the Great Hall. It has an elaborate plaster ceiling and the overmantel above the fireplace bears the arms of Queen Elizabeth I. The frieze of the Withdrawing Room incorporates shields of arms representing marriages of the Davenports.

The northern wing of Bramall came to be the service wing with the kitchen, scullery, butler's pantry, dairy and store rooms on the ground floor and the servants' bedrooms in the attic.

== Grounds ==
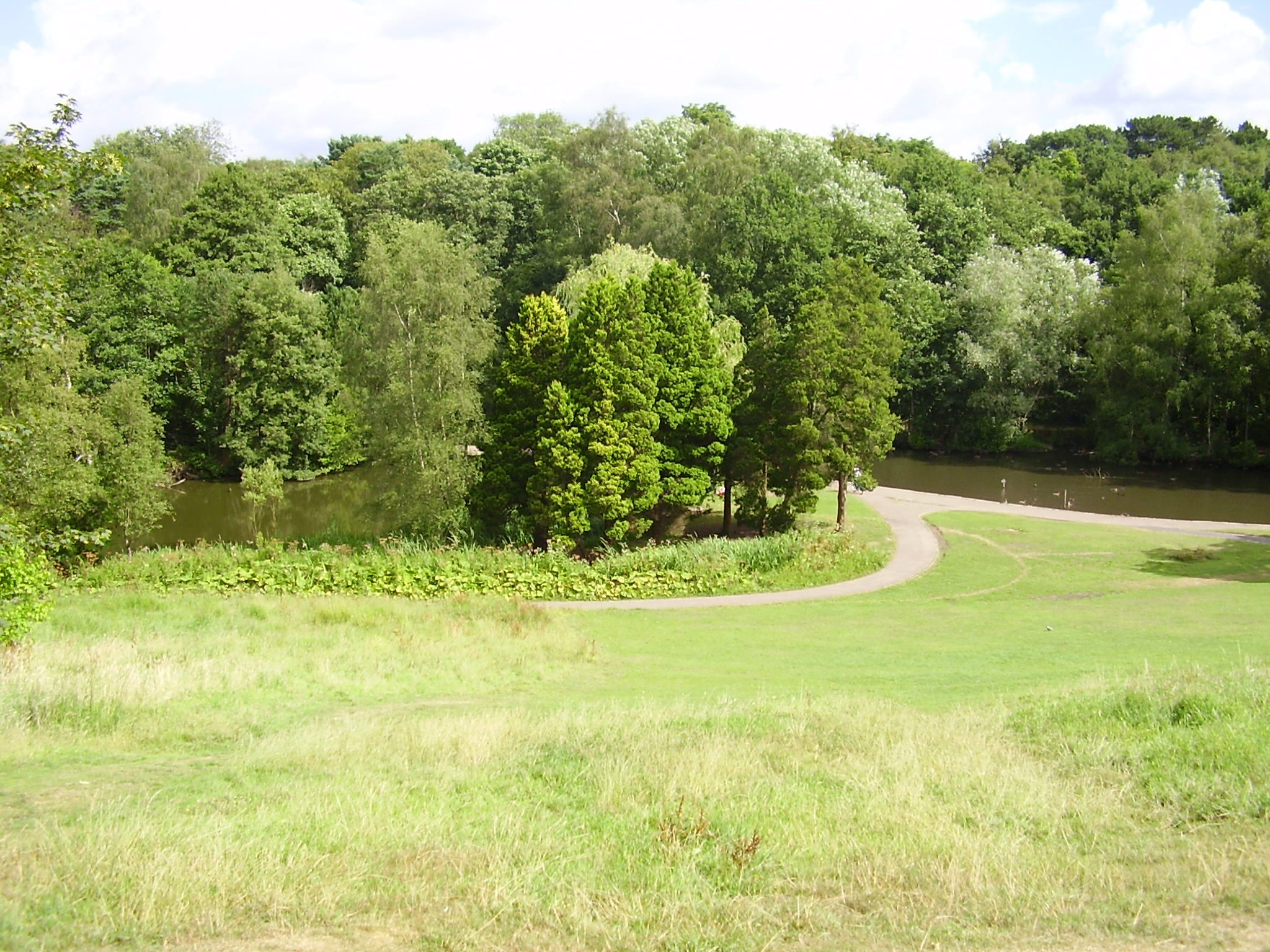
Part of the grounds and lakes

The house is set in around 70 acres (28 ha) of parkland, only a part of the estate originally attached to the house, which was, at one time, about 2,000 acres (810 ha) in extent. The park was used for hunting and the grounds were home to cattle, deer and horses until the 17th century, when it was used as agricultural land. Two water courses run through the park: the Ladybrook, which becomes the Micker Brook beyond the park, before flowing into the river Mersey and a stream known as Carr Brook. In the 1880s, Charles Nevill remodelled the grounds in the Romantic Victorian taste, altering the course of the Ladybrook, adding considerably to the trees in the park. He created artificial ponds, which were stocked with trout, although they are no longer fished. In 1888, a new drive was made through the park, a few yards further to the south of the house than its predecessor, and below the East front of the house Nevill set out terraces.

The park is open to the public and features woodland, open grass areas, gardens, a café, a bowling green and children's play areas.

== See also ==
- Grade I listed buildings in Greater Manchester
- Listed buildings in Hazel Grove and Bramhall
