= Woodford, Greater Manchester =

Village in Stockport, Greater Manchester, England

Coordinates: 53.339°N 2.156°W

Woodford
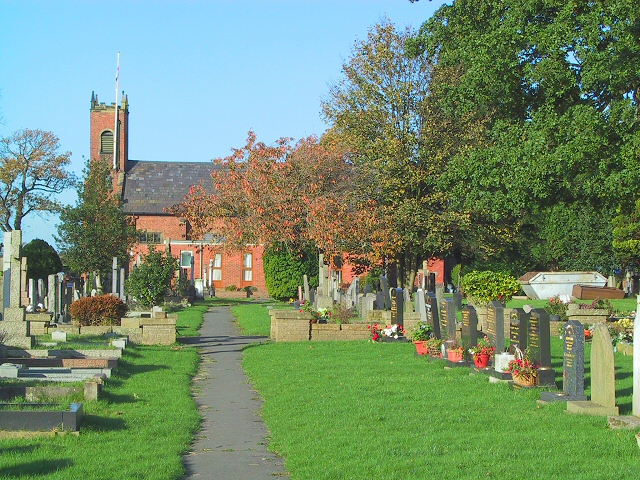
- Christ Church, Woodford, 2005

- Location within Greater Manchester
- OS grid reference: SJ895825
  - London: 153 mi (246 km) SE
- Metropolitan borough: Stockport
- Metropolitan county: Greater Manchester
- Region: North West
- Country: England
- Sovereign state: United Kingdom
- Post town: STOCKPORT
- Postcode district: SK7
- Dialling code: 0161
- Police: Greater Manchester
- Fire: Greater Manchester
- Ambulance: North West
- UK Parliament: Cheadle

Woodford is a village in the Metropolitan Borough of Stockport, Greater Manchester, England. It lies in the historic county of Cheshire, 5.2 miles (8.4 km) south of Stockport, 5.7 miles (9.2 km) north-west of Macclesfield and 10.7 miles (17.2 km) south-east of Manchester.

Woodford was a hamlet in the parish of Prestbury throughout the Middle Ages. It was incorporated into the Urban District of Hazel Grove and Bramhall in 1939 and then the Metropolitan Borough of Stockport in 1974.

Woodford Aerodrome was opened in 1924 by Avro and produced aircraft such as the Avro Lancaster in World War II; it closed in 2011 and was demolished in 2015. A new housing development has been built on the site.

Its historic properties include New Hall, a 17th-century cottage and Grade II* listed building.

== History ==
In 1248, the manor of Woodford was one of several in the Barony of Stockport. Land was cleared and improved for agriculture in the late 13th century and a cornmill existed by 1296. The barony shrank during the 14th century, and in 1355 land at Woodford was granted to the Davenport family. At this time Woodford was a hamlet on the edge of the Macclesfield Forest.

The Davenports are known to have extended the old hall at least once, and built the New Hall in the early 17th century. The exact building date is unknown, a lintel is inscribed '1630', but the building may have existed a few years earlier. The hall is the earliest surviving brick building in the area. The Davenports left the area for the considerably grander Capesthorne in the early 18th century, following a marriage described by Arrowsmith as "fortuitous".

=== Dean Water Mill ===
Also referred to as 'Dain' and 'Dane'.

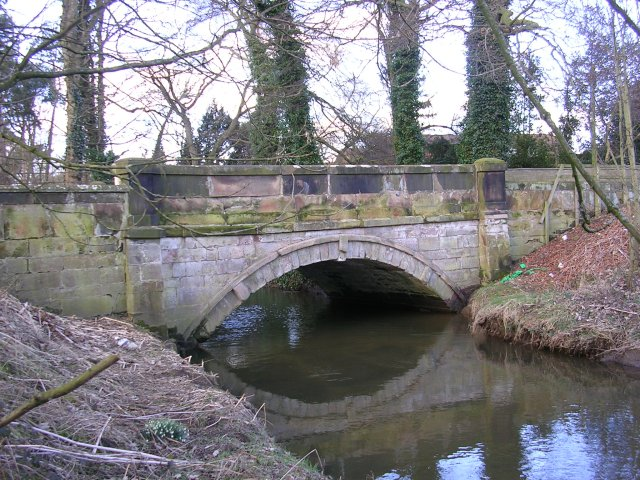
Deanwater Bridge in 2006

The River Dean marks the post-1974 county boundary between Cheshire and Greater Manchester. The A5102, Wilmslow Road, crosses the river at the Deanwater bridge. It was at the crossing that James Andrew of Compstall Bridge built the Dean Water calico printing mill in 1837, possibly on the site of an earlier calico printing mill. Deanwater House was built as the manager's house. The mill closed in 1848. It was bought and resold to the Davenports on the conditions that it was demolished. It was a sizeable concern employing 172 people, of which half lived in the parish of Woodford. It was driven by water with a supplementary 25 hp steam engine. It burnt down in 1851.

Employment at Dean Water Mill
	Adults over 21	Youngsters 13–18	Children under 13	Total
Male	47	22	22	91
Female	29	35	17	81
Total	76	57	39	172

James Andrew built up to 40 cottages for his workforce on King Street, and showed in interest in the building of the parish church of Christ Church. Christ Church was built in 1841 but not consecrated until 29 July 1872. The Methodist Chapel, Dean Row, on the other bank of the River Dean was opened in 1839. There was a Baptist chapel in Woodford.

A school was built in 1847 at the instigation of the Bromley-Davenport family. It was a junior school. The senior school, for the few who went, was in Wilmslow. The population of Woodford in 1848 was 564.

Deanwater House continued to have textile connections. Robert Platt was living at Deanwater in 1851. He was a cotton spinner from Stalybridge, who used to host annual parties for his 900 operatives and families, laying on a special train to bring them. Robert Platt moved to Dunham Massey Hall. James Butler Kelly lived in Deanwater around 1881. He had been born in Wakefield, Yorkshire and was the Bishop of Newfoundland. Then in 1891, Charles Edmondson, an engraver, and his family were the occupants of Deanwater. This calico printer had a wife and four children and employed four servants. Deanwater is now a hotel.

=== Woodford Aerodrome ===
Woodford Aerodrome was a factory and large airfield south of the village. The airfield was created from farmland by Avro during late 1924 following their eviction from Alexandra Park in Manchester. The first recorded air display was in 1925. Avro became a part of the Hawker Siddeley Group in the mid-1930s, and several new buildings were erected prior to the start of the Second World War. The major project during the mid-1930s to early wartime was the building of many thousands of twin-engined Avro Ansons for use as patrol aircraft, trainers and light transports.

The early part of the war saw a production run of 200 Avro Manchester bombers. The unreliability of their twin Rolls-Royce Vulture engines prompted the development of the Avro Lancaster, powered by four Rolls-Royce Merlins. Over 4000 Lancasters were assembled at the plant and these formed the backbone of RAF Bomber Command.

The Lancasters were followed by Lincoln bombers and then from 1949 the Shackleton maritime reconnaissance aircraft. The delta-winged Vulcan four-jet nuclear bomber rolled from the Woodford factory between the mid-1950s and early 1960s. Vulcan B2 XM603 is preserved at the airfield for static show purposes. From 1960 onwards, a series of civil airliners was built at Woodford, starting with the HS 748, then the BAe ATP, followed by the BAe 146 jet airliner. In the 2000s the Nimrod reconnaissance plane has been assembled at the plant.

From 1968 to 2000, an annual air show was held at the Aerodrome, organised by the Royal Air Forces Association. The airfield became the site of the BAE Systems Regional Aircraft Customer Training and Engineering department.

In 1989, 3,000 people were employed on the site. On 3 April 2008, BAE Systems announced it would be losing 134 jobs from the Woodford site. On 15 September 2009, BAE announced that the site would close in 2012, with the loss of the final 630 jobs. The site has now been demolished; however, the old fire station has been repurposed as the Avro Heritage Museum which honours the various Avro aircraft that were built on the site and maintains a collection of artefacts associated with their development.

A large housing estate named Woodford Garden Village is currently being built by Redrow Homes on the site of the Aerodrome, with construction having commenced in May 2016.

== Governance ==
Woodford lies within the historic county boundaries of Cheshire. It was in the Prestbury ecclesiastical parish and, later, in the Poor Law Union of Macclesfield. By the Early Modern period, Woodford constituted a township, and civil parish which on 1 April 1939 was abolished and merged with Hazel Grove and Bramhall and became part of the Urban District of Hazel Grove and Bramhall. In 1931 the parish had a population of 801. The urban district was abolished by the Local Government Act 1972 in 1974; Woodford became part of the Metropolitan Borough of Stockport, a local government district of the metropolitan county of Greater Manchester. Woodford lies in the parliamentary constituency of Cheadle, represented by Liberal Democrat Tom Morrison since 2024.

== Geography ==
Woodford forms a semi-rural area of mostly ribbon developments. The village has an open level aspect to it, most of the village is between 90 metres (300 ft) and 95 metres (312 ft) above mean sea level. This is due to being 5 kilometres (3.1 mi) west of the Red Rock Fault at Poynton where the millstone grits and coal measures of the Carboniferous period, made a 200 metres (660 ft) downfall, to be covered with glacial tills. The soils of Woodford consist of clay. It is close to the South Pennines and the Peak District. Forming the most southern point of Greater Manchester, the River Dean marks the border with Cheshire. To Woodford's north and northwest are the M60 and M56 motorways, providing road links to the rest of North West England.

Woodford's Met Office weather station recorded a temperature of −17.6 °C (0.3 °F) on 8 January 2010, during the winter of 2009–10 in the United Kingdom.

=== Climate ===
Climate data for Woodford (1991–2020)
Month	Jan	Feb	Mar	Apr	May	Jun	Jul	Aug	Sep	Oct	Nov	Dec	Year
Mean daily maximum °C (°F)	7.1 (44.8)	7.9 (46.2)	10.1 (50.2)	13.0 (55.4)	16.3 (61.3)	18.9 (66.0)	20.7 (69.3)	20.2 (68.4)	17.6 (63.7)	13.8 (56.8)	10.0 (50.0)	7.5 (45.5)	13.6 (56.5)
Daily mean °C (°F)	4.1 (39.4)	4.7 (40.5)	6.3 (43.3)	8.6 (47.5)	11.7 (53.1)	14.2 (57.6)	16.2 (61.2)	15.9 (60.6)	13.5 (56.3)	10.3 (50.5)	6.7 (44.1)	4.3 (39.7)	9.7 (49.5)
Mean daily minimum °C (°F)	1.1 (34.0)	1.4 (34.5)	2.4 (36.3)	4.1 (39.4)	7.1 (44.8)	9.6 (49.3)	11.8 (53.2)	11.6 (52.9)	9.5 (49.1)	6.8 (44.2)	3.4 (38.1)	1.2 (34.2)	5.9 (42.6)
Average precipitation mm (inches)	77.0 (3.03)	60.5 (2.38)	52.5 (2.07)	55.8 (2.20)	56.2 (2.21)	64.6 (2.54)	80.2 (3.16)	79.7 (3.14)	76.1 (3.00)	91.7 (3.61)	77.1 (3.04)	97.0 (3.82)	868.4 (34.19)
Average precipitation days (≥ 1.0 mm)	14.7	12.2	11.8	11.0	10.8	12.0	13.2	13.6	12.0	14.5	15.0	15.7	156.5
Mean monthly sunshine hours	45.1	76.1	103.9	151.2	179.3	179.5	157.1	145.0	137.7	94.7	62.6	53.1	1,385.1
Source: Met Office

== Religion ==
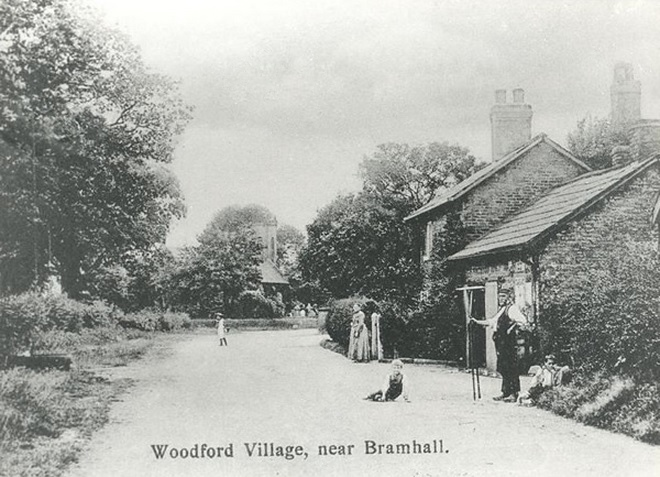
Chester Road, Woodford in 1904. In the distance is Christ Church

Woodford Christ Church was completed in 1841 as a chapel of ease to Prestbury. It is built of brick with stone used only for windows and other architectural features. A district chapelry was assigned to the church in 1873 which meant that Christ Church became a separate parish.

== Education ==
Woodford has one primary school, Woodford Primary, that opened in September 2022 on the Woodford Garden Village housing development. Other nearby schools are in Bramhall (Queensgate Primary and Bramhall High School). There was a Church of England primary school on Chester Road until it closed in 1983. The last headmaster was Mr George Ireland. A private school was then run on the same site until it closed in 2002 and the school buildings were converted to houses.

== Transport ==
The nearest railway stations are Bramhall and Poynton on the Stafford–Manchester line, and Wilmslow on the Crewe–Manchester line. Stopping services are operated by Northern.

There are buses to Stockport and Manchester, from a terminus next to the Davenport Arms public house, provided by Metroline Manchester:

- 42B: runs to Manchester every 30 minutes via Bramhall, Cheadle and Didsbury;
- 877: a school service that runs from Bramhall to Stockport College, via Bramhall High School.

== Notable people ==
Woodford has been the place of residence for George Best and Cristiano Ronaldo, both former wingers for Manchester United F.C. Ivan Mauger, Belle Vue Speedway team captain, also lived here.

== See also ==
- Listed buildings in Hazel Grove and Bramhall
