= Ruth Aylett =

British computer scientist (born 1951)

- Born: 1951 (age 74–75); London, England
- Education: London School of Economics
- Children: Owen Jones
- Scientific career
- Fields: Computer science
- Workplaces: Sheffield Hallam University; University of Edinburgh; University of Salford; Heriot-Watt University

Ruth S. Aylett (born 1951) is a British author, computer scientist, professor, poet and political activist. She is a professor of computer science at Heriot-Watt University in Edinburgh, where she specialises in affective computing, social computing, software agents, and human–robot interaction.

== Early life ==
Aylett was born in London.

== Research ==
Aylett's research involves affective computing, social computing, software agents, and human–robot interaction. She is the leader of Socially Competent Robots (SoCoRo), a project of the Engineering and Physical Sciences Research Council that studies whether robots can assist autistic people in learning to recognize facial expressions and other social cues.

She has also studied the use of "emotionally literate" robots for tutoring schoolchildren, developed interactive role-playing software intended to combat bullying, and performed with a robot poet named Sarah the Poetic Robot as part of the Edinburgh Free Fringe.

== Education and career ==
Aylett earned a degree in mathematical economics at the London School of Economics, and began her career in computing by working in technical support at International Computers Limited for three years, before moving to the University of Sheffield to work in computing and robotics. She became a lecturer at Sheffield Hallam University for five years, and then moved to the University of Edinburgh in 1989, as part of the Artificial Intelligence Applications Institute there. She moved again to the University of Salford in 1992, first as part of the IT Institute there and later in the Centre for Virtual Environments. There, she became Professor of Intelligent Virtual Environments in 2000. In 2004, she moved to her present position at Heriot-Watt University.

== Publications ==
Aylett's book Robots: Bringing Intelligent Machines to Life? (2002) is a historical exploration on robots, on the history of robotics, and on research problems confronting roboticists. Aimed at high-school age students, it consists of a sequence of two-page illustrated spreads on each of its topics.

She is the coauthor, with Judy Robertson, Lisa Gjedde, Rose Luckin and Paul Brna, of the self-published book Inside Stories: A Narrative Journey (2008), on the use of story-telling in education and the use of technology to assist in storytelling.

Aylett is also the coauthor of the poetry pamphlet Handfast: Poetry Duets with Beth McDonough (Mothers Milk, 2016). It has a challenge-response format, in which a poem by one of the authors inspires a poem by the other author exploring the same theme.

Aylett co-authored Inside DAMMA: the Department of Applied Meta-Magical Anthropology with Morag Burgon-Lyon, Greg Michaelson and Judy Robertson (Read Fiction, 2023). This satire on contemporary University life was written as part of a project on facilitating academic research cooperation.

Equinox, co-authored with Greg Michaelson, was published by "Stairwell Books" in 2023. This Science Fiction/Fantasy, written during lockdown, is about how an attempt to extract free energy from beneath Rannoch Moor breaks the multi-verse and angers the witches from Macbeth. Their sequel Solstice was published by "Stairwell Books" in 2025.

== Personal life ==
She is the mother of writer and activist Owen Jones. She met her husband, union organiser Robert Jones, through their membership in the Militant tendency, a Trotskyist group within the Labour Party. He developed prostate cancer, and died in 2018.

As a political activist, Aylett has advocated for the Labour Party, for improved labour security for university staff, and for permanent residency for European Union citizens already in the UK at the time of Brexit. She has been advocating for academic freedom for faculty and students in the face of the 'Counter-terrorism and security bill' legislation (2015) by signing a letter claiming the bill ran counter to universities' mission to foster free speech as well as being 'unenforceable' and 'unlawful'. In addition to her support for transgender rights, she has served as one of the leaders of the Labour Party in Edinburgh Southern.
