= Jack Hawkes (botanist) =

British botanist (1915–2007)

John Gregory Hawkes OBE FLS (27 June 1915 in Bristol – 6 September 2007 in Reading) was a British botanist, Mason Professor of Botany at the University of Birmingham.

He was a student at Cambridge University Botany School where obtained his Ph.D. (1941) and Sc.D. (1957).

He specialised in studying the taxonomy of wild potato species (Solanum sect. Petota), identified sources of resistance to the potato cyst nematode and played a role in establishing programs to maintain agricultural biodiversity.

He was awarded the OBE in the 1994 Birthday Honours. In 1985 he was awarded the Linnean Medal for Botany by the Linnean Society.

He treated much of the Solanaceae for Flora Europaea, started the Solanaceae Newsletter and organised the first Symposium on the Solanaceae.

At Birmingham he started the M.Sc. course in the Conservation and Utilization of Plant Genetic Resources, which trained international students.

Working with Birmingham Natural History Society and Dorothy Cadbury he produced "A computer - mapped flora and study of the county of Warwickshire" (1971). This was an innovative use of computers at the time using Punched tape storage, which led to problems later on when the computer department updated their system and the old tapes had to be read slowly so as not to damage them.

In 1977, Argentinian botanist Armando Theodoro Hunziker named a genus of plants from South America, Hawkesiophyton (belonging to the family Solanaceae) after Hawkes.

== Selected publications ==
- A computer-mapped flora, a study of the County of Warwickshire. Cadbury, D. A., Hawkes, J. G., Readett, R. C. (1971). Birmingham Natural History and Philosophical Society (Birmingham, England), Academic Press. ISBN 9780123333605
- A bibliography of plant genetic resources. Hawkes, J. G., Williams, John Trevor, Hanson, Jean (1976). Rome: International Board for Plant Genetic Resources.
- The Biology and taxonomy of the Solanaceae. Hawkes, J. G., Lester, R. N., Skelding, A. D. (1979). Linnean Society of London, Academic Press. ISBN 9780123331502
- The potato: evolution, biodiversity and genetic resources. Hawkes, J. G. (1990). London: Belhaven. ISBN 9781852930455
