= Bollington =

Town in Cheshire, England

Coordinates: 53.298°N 2.093°W

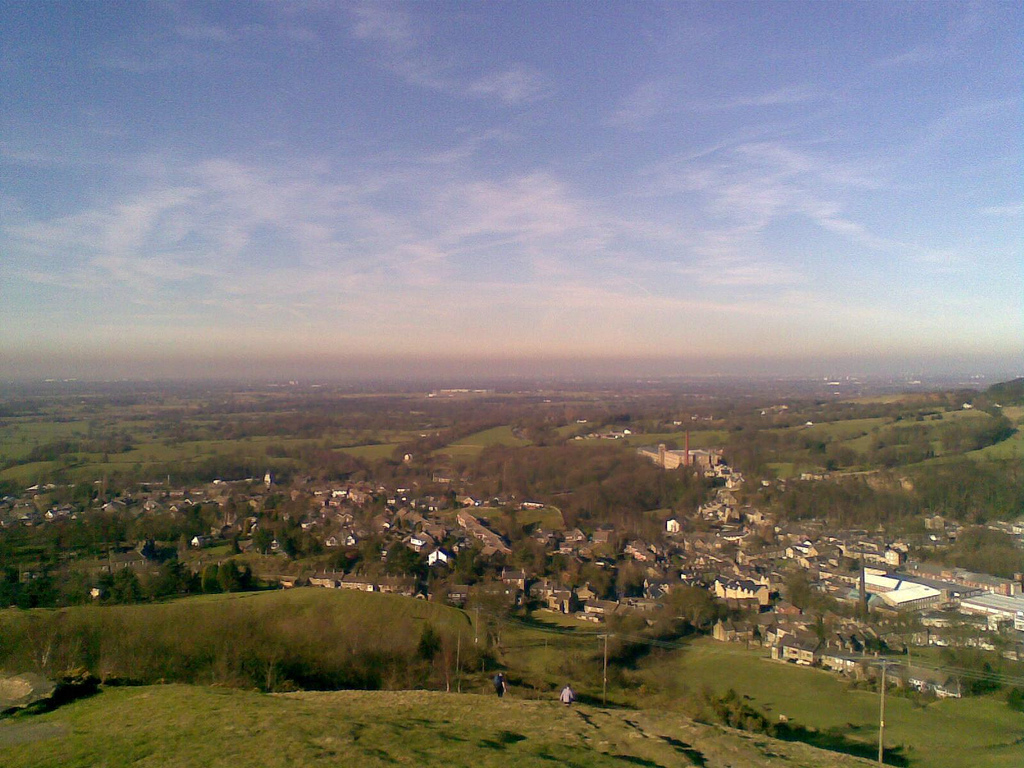
- A view over Bollington from White Nancy, looking north in 2008

- Location within Cheshire
- Population: 7,944 (Parish, 2021); 7,235 (Built up area, 2021)
- OS grid reference: SJ9377
- Civil parish: Bollington
- Unitary authority: Cheshire East
- Ceremonial county: Cheshire
- Region: North West
- Country: England
- Sovereign state: United Kingdom
- Post town: MACCLESFIELD
- Postcode district: SK10
- Dialling code: 01625
- Police: Cheshire
- Fire: Cheshire
- Ambulance: North West
- UK Parliament: Macclesfield
- Website: bollington-tc.gov.uk

Bollington is a town and civil parish in Cheshire, England, to the east of Prestbury. In the Middle Ages, it was part of the Earl of Chester's manor of Macclesfield and the ancient parish of Prestbury. At the 2021 census, the parish had a population of 7,944 and the built up area had a population of 7,235.

Bollington is on the River Dean and the Macclesfield Canal, on the south-western edge of the Peak District. Rising above the town on Kerridge Hill is White Nancy, a structure built to commemorate the victory at the Battle of Waterloo.

== History ==
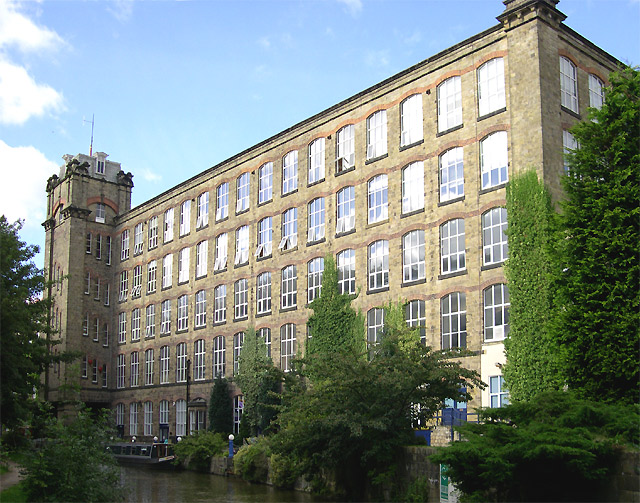
Clarence Mill and the Macclesfield Canal in 2007

From the late 18th through to the mid-20th centuries, Bollington was a major centre for cotton-spinning. Waterhouse Mill, now demolished, off Wellington Road, once spun the finest cotton in the world, and was sought after by lace makers in Nottingham and in Brussels, Belgium.

Clarence Mill still stands on Clarence Road. The lower floors remain commercial but the upper floors have been converted into apartments. One of the oldest surviving mills in Bollington is the very small Defiance Mill, built on Queen Street about 1800 and now restored for residential occupation.

There is a large paper coating mill on the site of Lower Mills. The original mill was built by George Antrobus in 1792, but very little of those buildings remain. A stone-built traditional mill still survives amongst the 20th century brick and 21st century steel developments. In the 1830s and 1840s, this mill was rented to Thomas Oliver and Martin Swindells for the production of fine cotton thread for the lace-making industry. Lowerhouse Mill (Antrobus, 1819, later occupied by Samuel Greg Junior) also produced coated papers and remained as an industrial mill until it closed in 2025.

The other remaining mill is Adelphi Mill (Swindells, 1856), which is today entirely commercial.

In 1801, the population was 1,231; by 1851, the population was 4,655; and in 1901, it had grown to 5,245. Population growth slowed during the mid-20th century, such that by 1951 the population was 5,644. By 2001 the population had reached 7,095; in 2011 it was 8,310.

== Governance ==
There are two tiers of local government covering Bollington, at civil parish (town) and unitary authority level: Bollington Town Council and Cheshire East Council. The town council is based at the Town Hall on Wellington Road.

The town falls within the House of Commons constituency of Macclesfield, which has been represented by the Labour Party MP Tim Roca since 2024.

=== Administrative history ===
Bollington was historically a township in the ancient parish of Prestbury, which formed part of the Macclesfield Hundred of Cheshire. From the 17th century onwards, parishes were gradually given various civil functions under the Poor Laws, in addition to their original ecclesiastical functions. In some cases, including Prestbury, the civil functions were exercised by each township separately rather than the parish as a whole. In 1866, the legal definition of 'parish' was changed to be the areas used for administering the Poor Laws and so Bollington became a civil parish.

Bollington was made a local government district in 1862, governed by an elected local board. Such districts were reconstituted as urban districts under the Local Government Act 1894.

Bollington Urban District was abolished in 1974 under the Local Government Act 1972. A successor parish called Bollington was established covering the same area as the abolished urban district, with its parish council taking the name Bollington Town Council. District-level functions passed to Macclesfield Borough Council. In 2009, Cheshire East Council was created, taking over the functions of the borough council and Cheshire County Council, which were both abolished.

== Services and provisions ==
Cheshire Fire and Rescue Service have a retained fire station in Bollington, on Albert Road. The town has a medical practice on Wellington Road and a dental surgery on Bollington Road. The town does not have its own police station; policing is provided by the Cheshire Constabulary. The town has a small yet thriving local retail community, with two bakers, two butchers, a delicatessen, a newsagent, a florist and two convenience stores: Co-op and Tesco. The town has several notable takeaways, restaurants, wine bars and coffee shops, along with around ten traditional public houses.

The Holly Bush pub was built in about 1935 and is a rare example of an almost intact Brewer's Tudor style pub from this period; it is recorded in the National Heritage List for England as a designated Grade II listed building.

== Education ==
Bollington is served by three primary schools: the secular Dean Valley Community Primary School, and two Church of England primary schools in the town: St John the Baptist Church of England and, at Bollington Cross, St Oswald's Primary School. St Gregory's Catholic Primary School closed at the end of 2023. Secondary-aged students travel to Tytherington School, The Fallibroome Academy, The King's School or All Hallows Catholic College (all in Macclesfield) or to Poynton High School.

== Sport ==
The Bollington Recreation Ground, across the road from the Civic Hall and library, provides a football pitch, bowling green, tennis court and cricket pitch, Bollington Cricket Club, Bollington Athletics Club, and the Bollington Bowling Club. A further cricket pitch, located along Clarke Lane by The Lord Clyde pub, is home to Kerridge Cricket Club. Bollington has a hockey club, which plays on the King's School AstroTurf pitches. There are a number of other sporting activity groups, including cycling, walking and swimming.

A village football club, Bollington F.C., took part in the main rounds of the FA Cup in the 1880s.

Other activities are based at the Bollington Health and Leisure Centre at Heath Road, Bollington Cross and The Capelli Sports Ground. The latter is the home of Bollington United Football Club, formed in 1986 by Sid Bennett and Ernie Mottershead; the club's crest features White Nancy, a significant landmark within the Bollington area.

Perhaps because of its proximity to the home of British Cycling and its location between the relatively flat Cheshire Plain and the hillier Peak District, Bollington is home to a number of professional road and track cyclists. They include Adam Blythe and Ethan Vernon.

== Landmarks ==
Bollington is notable for White Nancy, a stone folly located on top of Kerridge Hill. At circa six metres high and painted white, this 1817 structure to victory at the Battle of Waterloo is visible from as far away as Shropshire and the western hills of Cheshire. It had an entrance originally to the interior, where the visitor would find a single room with stone benches and a round table. However, vandalism reportedly prompted the closure of the entrance sometime in the 20th century. It has been subjected to repeated painting and vandalism since then and Bollington Town Council has claimed that a special kind of masonry paint is required every time that the White Nancy is vandalised.

The big mills, Clarence, Adelphi and Lowerhouse, are notable examples of 19th-century mill buildings in the north-west of England.

== Culture ==
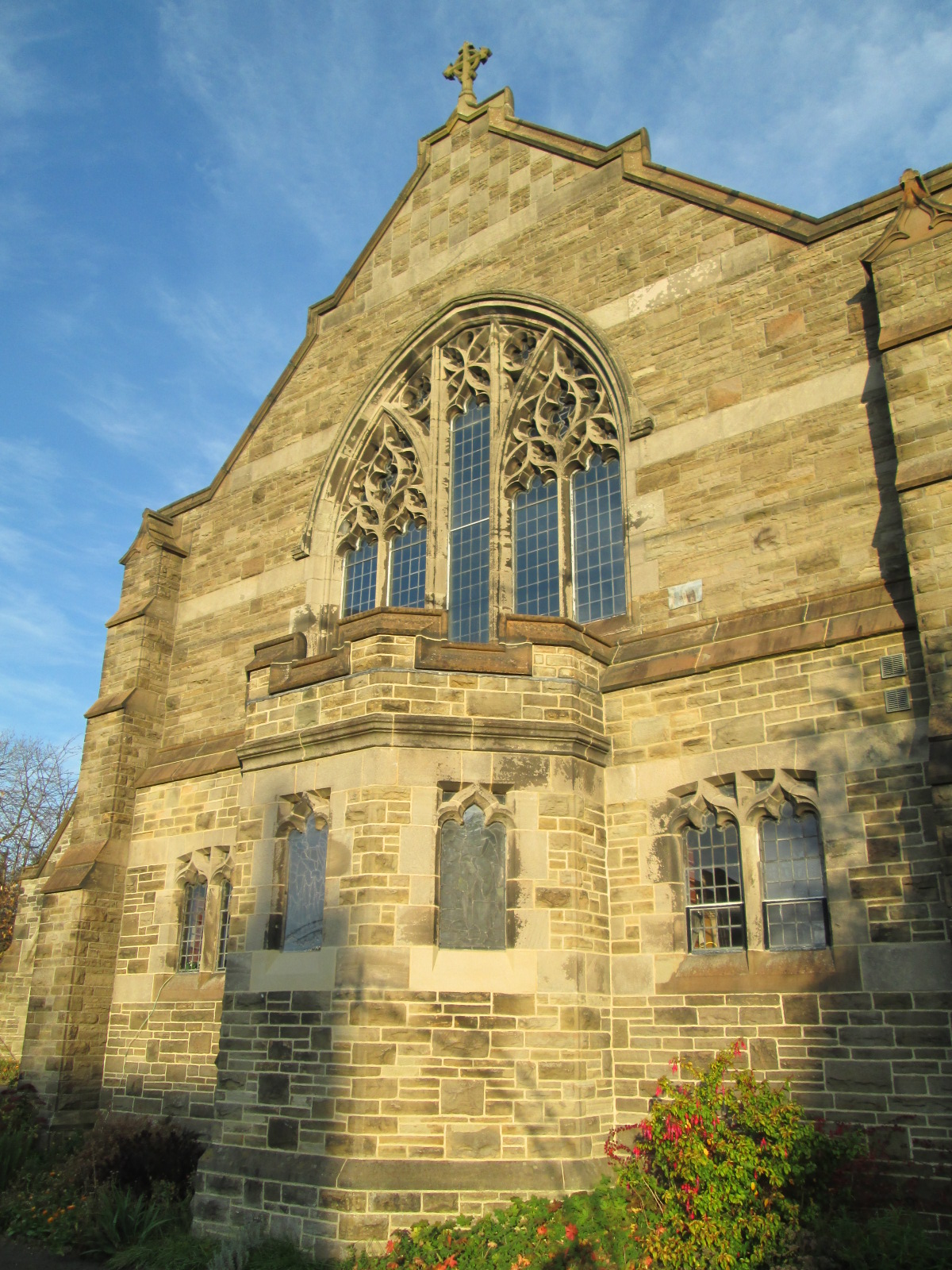
St Oswald's Church in 2018

The town has several churches. The parish St John the Baptist's Church closed in 2006, leaving St Oswald's Church in Bollington Cross as the only Anglican church. St Gregory's Church on Wellington Road is the Roman Catholic place of worship in the town. The Grade-II listed Methodist Church on Wellington Road closed to worship in 2012 and in 2016 the lower floor was converted into a childcare centre.

In 2005, Canalside Community Radio was launched to provide community news and entertainment for the duration of the festival. Cousins John and Terry Waite opened the 2005 Bollington Festival, together with the Discovery Centre. In December 2008, Canalside Radio began broadcasting to north-east Cheshire on 102.8 FM, having obtained a full-time licence after five years of trying.

Hiking, cycling and riding through the hills around Bollington and along the Macclesfield Canal towpath, as well as the Middlewood Way (a disused railway), are popular activities. Boats and bikes can be hired for day trips and holidays at Grimshaw Lane canal wharf. The Peak District Boundary Walk runs through the town, as does the Gritstone Trail.

The town has many traditional public houses, most of which have not been modernised.

=== Events ===
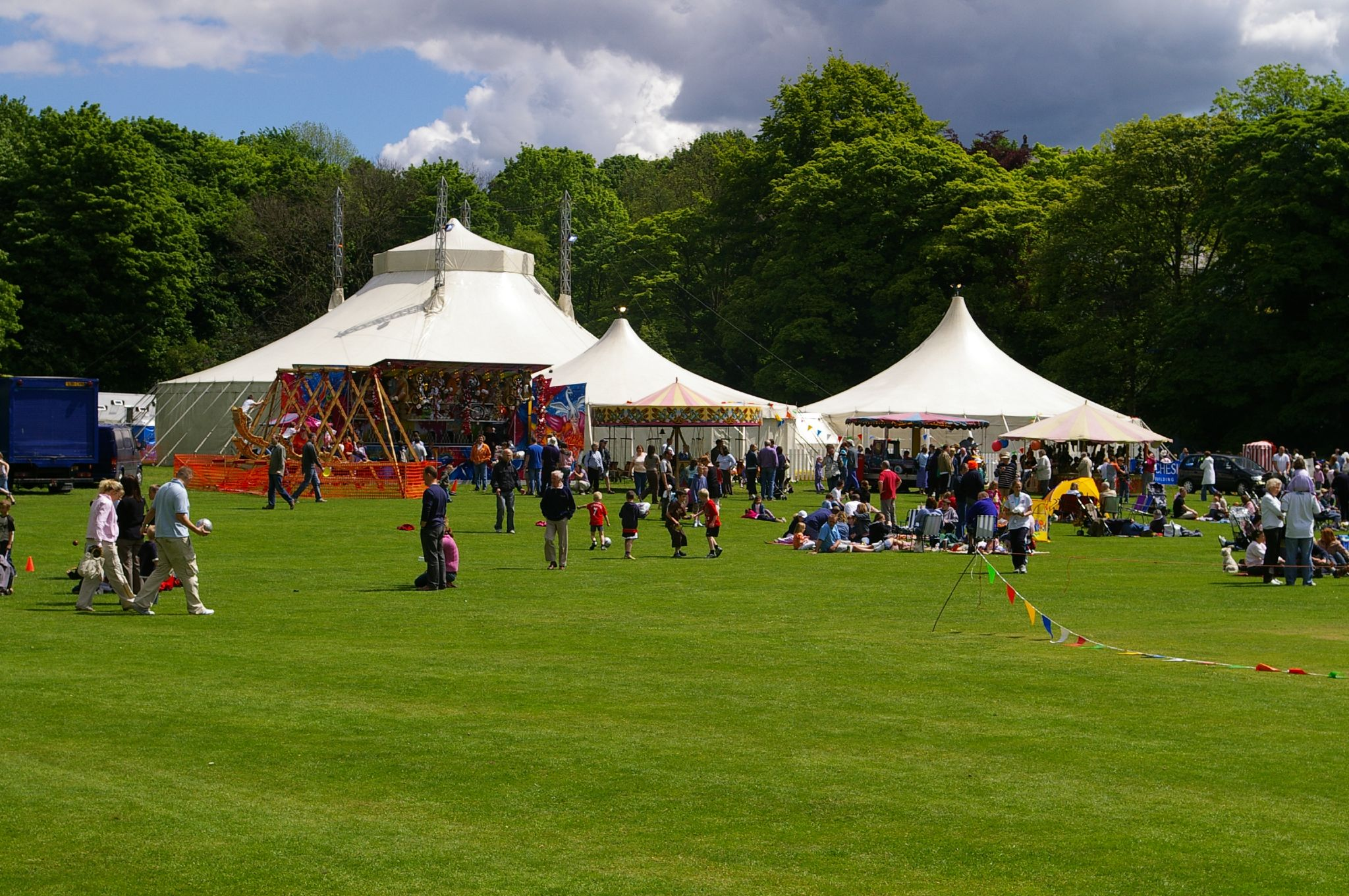
Bollington Festival 2005

Every five or six years since 1964, the town hosts the Bollington Festival, which runs for two and a half weeks and involves a wide variety of community activities, from concerts, theatrical, opera, art exhibitions, to local history events, science events and competitions. The last Festival was in 2019 and the next is scheduled for 2026, having been delayed by COVID-19 and the financial environment.

In September each year, a ten-day Walking Festival promotes exercise and fresh air while taking in the beauty of the surrounding countryside, the western hills of the Peak District.

Bollington hosts an annual Carols around the Christmas Tree on Christmas Eve each year.

At midday on Christmas Day each year, a brass band play at White Nancy.

=== Societies and organisations ===
Bollington has a branch of the Women's Institute, which meets regularly, while retired gentlemen may meet at the weekly Probus Club and likewise the ladies at their monthly Probus Club.

The Guide and Scout movements are all represented. Bollington United Junior Football Club (J.F.C.) has three clubs for children ranging from under-10s to under-17s.

Bollington is home to 236 Squadron of the Royal Air Force's Air Training Corps, which has its headquarters on Shrigley Road. The Squadron had close links with No. 42 (Reserve) Squadron (formerly No. 236 OCU) of the Royal Air Force before the latter was disbanded in the government defence review in 2010. The Sea Cadets is for 10‑ to 18‑year‑olds. The Bollington and Macclesfield Sea Cadets also have a unit website.

There are numerous artistic, musical and theatrical groups all providing popular exhibitions and performances. Many of these are held at the Bollington Arts Centre.

== Transport ==
=== Roads ===
Bollington is 2 miles (3.2 km) from the A523 road that runs from Hazel Grove, through Macclesfield to Leek in Staffordshire.

The nearest motorway junctions are J17 and J19 (Congleton and Knutsford) on the M6, and J1 (Stockport) on the M60.

=== Buses ===
Bus services connect Bollington with Macclesfield, Hazel Grove and Stockport, operated by D&G Bus.

=== Railway ===
The village no longer has its own railway station; the nearest now being at Macclesfield, for inter-city trains to London Euston and Manchester Piccadilly, and Prestbury for local stopping trains.

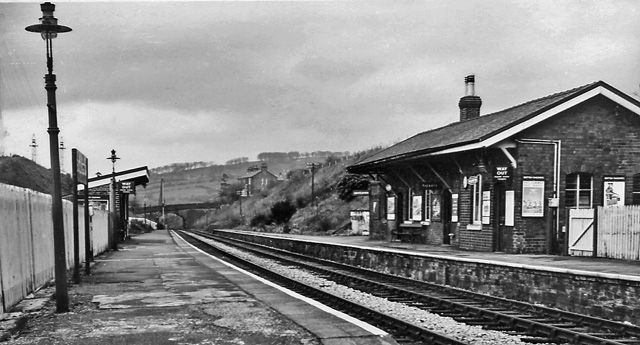
Bollington railway station, 1965

Bollington used to be served by the Macclesfield, Bollington and Marple Railway (MB&MR), which operated between Rose Hill Marple and Macclesfield. The railway was built in 1869 by the Manchester, Sheffield and Lincolnshire Railway (MS&LR) and the North Staffordshire Railway (NSR), as a part of a quest to provide an alternative link between Manchester and the south that was independent of the London and North Western Railway (L&NWR). Cotton mill owner Thomas Oliver had suggested this route hoping to revive the cotton mills of Bollington, the Kerridge stone quarries and the coal fields at Poynton. The line was closed in January 1970, as part of the Beeching cuts' route closures and service changes. The trackbed is now used as a shared-use path for walking, cycling and horse riding; it is known as the Middlewood Way.

=== Water ===
The Macclesfield Canal passes through the centre of the town and is a picturesque and rural part of the Cheshire Ring. The stretch from Marple Junction on the Peak Forest Canal to Bosley Lock Flight is without lock and is carried on an embankment through Bollington. Kerridge was the scene of a spectacular breach on 29 February 1912, where the water from Bosley to Bugsworth basin emptied through the town. Today, the canal is used for leisure purposes.

== Media ==
Bollington Live! is a publication produced three times a year by a team of volunteer writers, an editor and distributors. It is funded by local businesses who sponsor and advertise. It covers a wide range of issues of local interest from historical articles to matters of current concern. The magazine is delivered free to every household and business in Bollington, plus others in Pott Shrigley and Whiteley Green by almost fifty volunteers. The magazine was started in 1994 by a group of residents who felt that, whilst Bollington was served by the neighbouring Macclesfield newspapers, it was in need of a Bollington-centred publication. All copies are available online on the town's extensive Happy Valley website.

Local news and television programmes are provided by BBC North West and ITV Granada. Television signals are received from the Winter Hill transmitting station on Winter Hill.

Local radio stations are BBC Radio Manchester, Heart North West, Smooth North West, Capital Manchester and Lancashire, Greatest Hits Radio Manchester & The North West, Silk Radio and Canalside Radio, a community-based station.

== Notable people ==
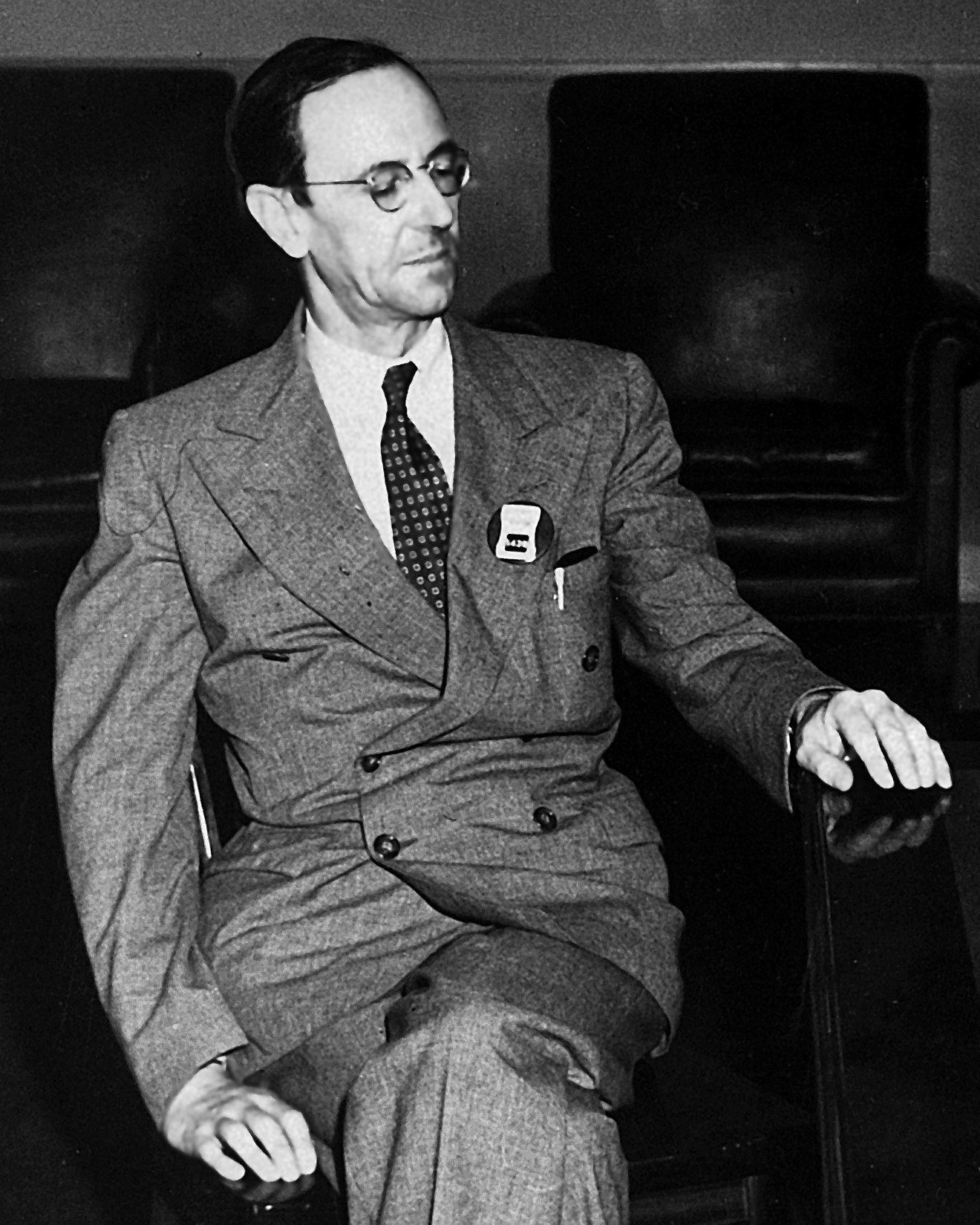
Sir James Chadwick, c. 1945

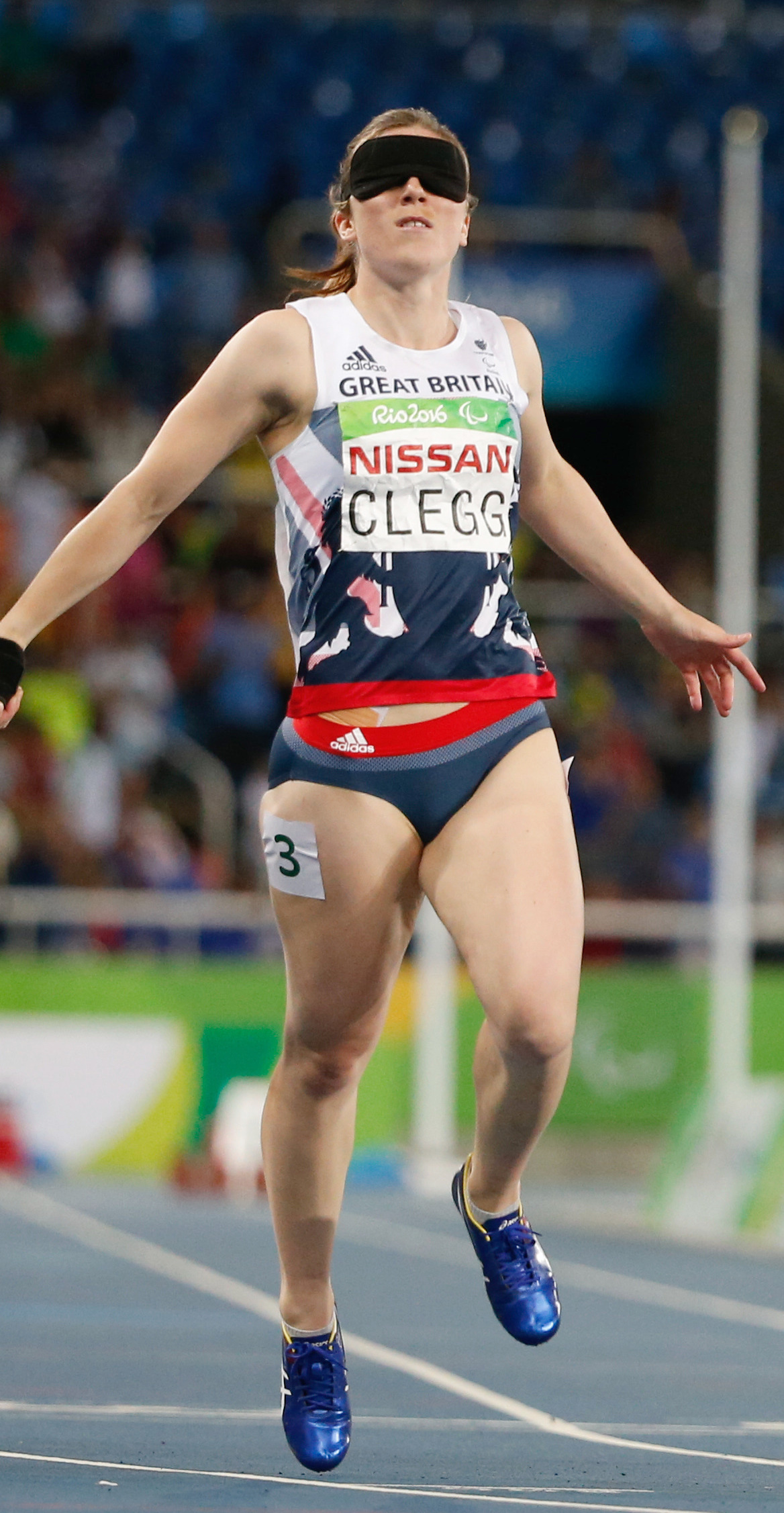
Libby Clegg, 2016

- Samuel Greg Junior (1804–1876), English industrialist and philanthropist, took over management of Lowerhouse Mill in Bollington in 1832 and used it as a basis for social experimentation.
- John Ryle (1817–1887), silk manufacturer, was born in Bollington. He emigrated to the United States in 1839 and was the Mayor of Paterson, New Jersey from 1869 to 1870.
- William Collard Smith (1830 in Bollington – 1894), Australian politician, emigrated to Australia in 1852, became a politician in colonial Victoria, and was a member of the Victorian Legislative Assembly.
- Emma Brooke (1844–1926), British novelist and campaigner for the rights of women and workers, was brought up in Bollington.
- Sir James Chadwick (1891 in Bollington – 1974), nuclear physicist who received the Nobel Prize in Physics in 1935 for his discovery of the neutron, was educated at Bollington Cross School.
- Colonel George Holland Hartley (1912–1995), Rhodesian and Zimbabwean civil servant, Army officer, farmer and politician.
- Terry Waite (born 1939 in Bollington), who was held hostage for four years in Lebanon and devoted his life to humanitarian causes, lived for a very short time in Bollington; his father was a policemen in Styal.
- David Dickinson (born 1941), antiques dealer and television presenter, lived for several years in Bollington.
- Angie Lewin (born 1963 in Bollington), designer of prints and screens, was brought up in Bollington.

=== Sport ===
- Jack Plant (born 1870 in Bollington–1950), footballer, played for Bury, and earned one cap for England in 1900.
- Arthur Gaskell (1886–1944), footballer who played 105 games for Bolton Wanderers F.C.
- James Bailey (born 1988), retired footballer, played 233 games, was brought up in Bollington.
- Libby Clegg (born 1990), blind athlete and a double Paralympic champion; she lived in Bollington in her early life and was partially educated at St Gregory's Primary, before moving to Scotland at age 11.
- Ben Amos (born 1990), football goalkeeper, has played over 250 games including for Port Vale, lived for some years in Bollington.
- Richard Cragg, cricket player for cheshire county. Born in Adlington, now residing in Bollington. Has a cricket ground in bramhall named after him.

== See also ==
- Listed buildings in Bollington
- Hollin Old Hall
- Clarence Mill
