= Bollington Festival =

The Bollington Festival is a festival which takes place every four or five years in the small town of Bollington in the Pennine foothills near Macclesfield, Cheshire in England.

== History ==
The festival was the idea of John Coope, a doctor. Dr John set out in the 1960s to create in the village a sense of community to counteract what he saw as a drift away from the collective towards the individual, and his work continued until his death on Christmas Day 2008. The 2005 festival was the first in which he played no major role.

Coope believed that a community should be alive and kicking and, above all, an active place where people join together to achieve more than they can as lone operators. His legacy is in the organisations he launched, revived and often led: the brass band; the drama group; the festival players; the light opera group; the civic society; and the festival choir. He was also the driving force in the creation of an arts centre (few English towns of 7,000 people have one), a regular venue for string quartets, jazz, stand-up comedy, plays, pantomimes, as well as talks and lectures.

== 2009 Festival ==
The 2009 festival boasted 94 events in 18 days, and its principal venue was a 550-seat marquee, with comfortable seats, lighting rig and full sound system, erected on the town’s recreation ground. Events ranged from a dog show to opera. Celebrations began with the official opening on May 8 by broadcaster Jenni Murray and ended with the traditional torchlight procession up White Nancy, the local hill-top folly, on the last night on May 25.

The music programme was aimed at all tastes: a concert version of Gershwin’s opera Porgy and Bess and two performances of Jonathan Doves’s opera Tobias and the Angel; a symphony concert; jazz with the Big Chris Barber Band, the Royal Northern College of Music Jazz Collective and Dave Mott; and folk with the New Rope String Band. The Upbeat Beatles sang with the Festival Orchestra and 17-year-old singer-songwriter Joni Fuller had a solo.

The aZZiZ company of drummers and dancers brought traditional music from South Africa, Ghana, Zimbabwe and Senegal, and Kim Schwartz and David Benitez demonstrated the sultry art of tango. There were also two big comedy nights: plays from (Dr Faustus, Wind In the Willows and Weekend Breaks by John Godber, and poetry with Carol Ann Duffy, Michael Symmons Roberts and Jackie Kay. There were also evenings with Barrie Rutter, founder of pioneering theatre company Northern Broadsides, and Sir Mark Elder, music director of the Hallé. Exhibitions included the work of artists working in and around Bollington – a map guided visitors round their studios. Up to 50 pictures by Guardian photographer Don McPhee were on show in the Arts Centre.

There was also a major science strand (measure the speed of light with a microwave oven), a fell race and many events aimed at children.

== Sources ==
- The Bollington Festival
- Joni Fuller
- The Chris Barber Band
