= Kerridge Hill =

Hill in Cheshire, England

- Kerridge Ridge
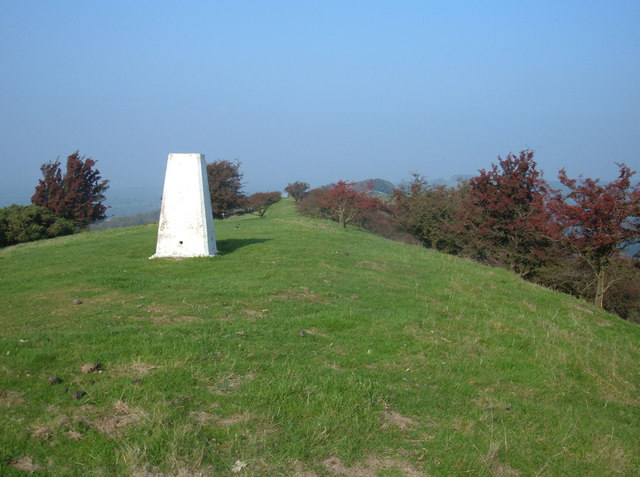
- The hill in 2006

Highest point
- Elevation: 313 metres (1,027 ft)
- Coordinates: 53°16′50″N 2°05′16″W

Geography
- Location: Cheshire, England
- OS grid: SJ 942760
- Topo map: OS Explorer OL24

Kerridge Hill (also called Kerridge Ridge) is a hill in Cheshire, near the village of Kerridge on the outskirts of Bollington, England. The summit is 313 metres (1,027 ft) above sea level. The River Dean runs along the eastern foot of the hill.

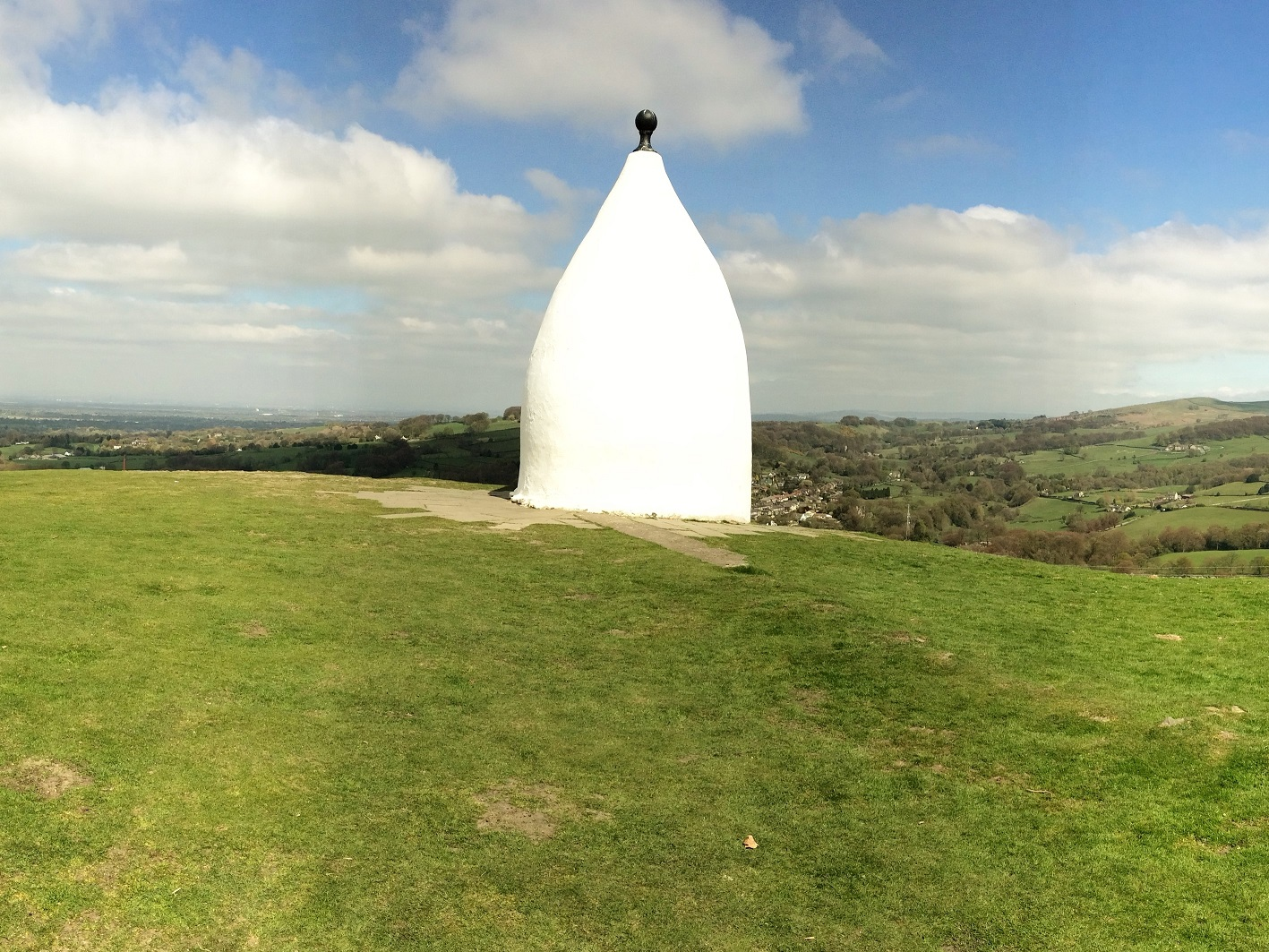
White Nancy monument on Kerridge Hill in 2014

White Nancy is a prominent landmark towards the north end of the ridge. The white-washed, sugarloaf-shaped folly was erected in 1817 for John Gaskell Junior of North End Farm, as a monument to the Duke of Wellington's victory at the Battle of Waterloo (1815). The structure was built of rendered sandstone rubble. The entrance is now blocked but inside is a room with and a circular stone table surrounded by a curved stone bench. It is a protected Grade II listed building.

Kerridge Hill is a designated nature reserve, managed and owned (since 2019) by the Cheshire Wildlife Trust. The reserve is a species-rich grassland with an abundance of native wildflowers including betony, devils-bit scabious and knapweed. This grassland habitat attracts pollinators such as bumblebees and 10 butterfly species, including small heath, wall brown and small skipper. Blackcap, chiffchaff and tawny owls are among the birds which inhabit the reserve. In autumn the rare waxcap mushroom spreads through the grass sward.

On the west side of the ridge are Bridge Quarry (formerly Victoria Quarry, combining Bridge End Quarry and Sycamore Quarry) and Marksend Quarry (formerly Parks End Quarry). The boundary between the two quarries is marked with an estate boundary stone, which is dated 1830. The ashlar sandstone block, at the base of a dry stone wall, is designated Grade II on the national heritage list. Below Bridge Quarry is Endon Hall, which was built in the 1830s by William Clayton who owned the local quarries.

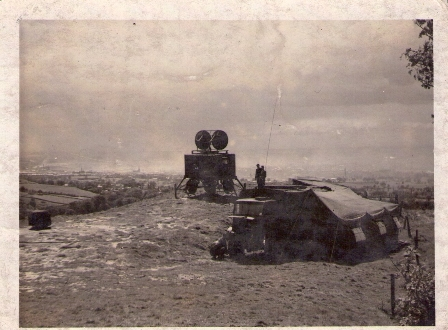
British Army Signals Trials Unit testing cathode ray signals on Kerridge Hill 1948

In the mid-1940s, the Royal Signal Corps Trials Unit based at Catterick would drive a truck-mounted dish-shaped transmitter/receiver up onto Kerridge Hill. Here they tested cathode-ray tube transmission and reception (data-based, not images), to a mobile receiving station on another truck. The receiver would be driven further and further south over time, until eventually the lads at Kerridge Hill were sending a signal to the south coast of the country.

The Gritstone Trail footpath runs along the ridge between Tower Hill and White Nancy.

The Peak District Boundary Walk long-distance footpath follows the same route along the ridge as the Gritstone Trail but continues through Bollington. Kerrridge Hill is just outside the Peak District National Park, its boundary lying less than 1km to the east.
