= St John the Baptist's Church, Bollington =

Coordinates: 53.2970°N 2.0930°W

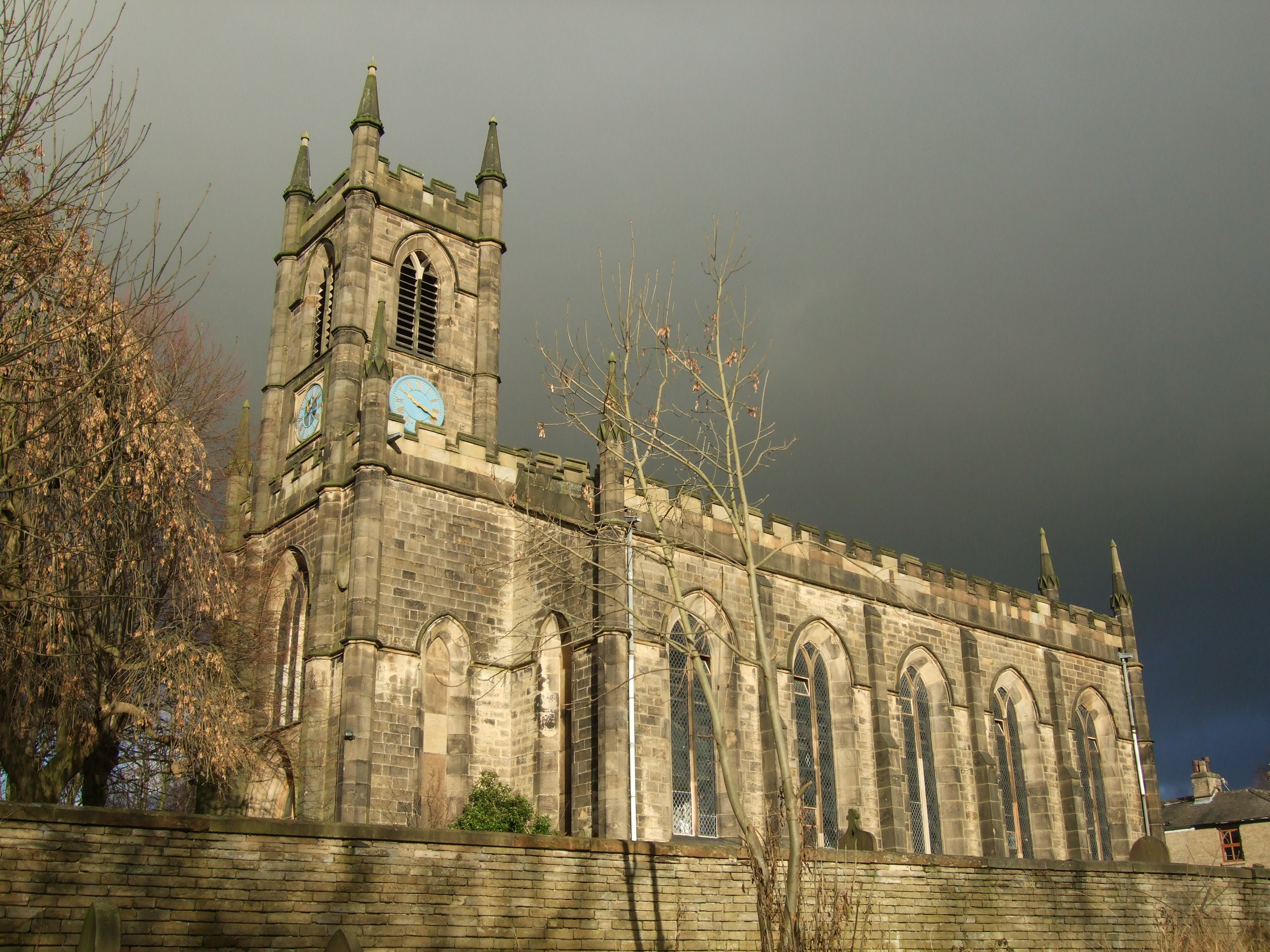
- St John the Baptist's Church, Bollington, from the southwest in 2011

- Location in Cheshire
- OS grid reference: SJ 9390 7778
- Location: Church Street, Bollington, Cheshire
- Country: England
- Denomination: Anglican

History
- Status: Former parish church
- Dedication: St John the Baptist

Architecture
- Functional status: Redundant
- Heritage designation: Grade II
- Designated: 9 December 1983
- Architect(s): William Hayley and Thomas Brown
- Architectural type: Church
- Style: Gothic Revival
- Groundbreaking: 1832
- Completed: 1834
- Construction cost: £4,002
- Closed: 1 February 2006

Specifications
- Materials: Sandstone, slate roofs

St John the Baptist's Church is a redundant Anglican parish church in Church Street, Bollington, Cheshire, England. It is recorded in the National Heritage List for England (NHLE) as a designated Grade II listed building. It was a Commissioners' church, having received a grant towards its construction from the Church Building Commission. The parish church is now St Oswald's Church, Bollington.

== History ==
The church was built between 1832 and 1834, and was designed by William Hayley and Thomas Brown. A grant of £3,475 (equivalent to £390,000 in 2025) was given towards its construction by the Church Building Commission. The total building cost was £4,002 (equivalent to £450,000 in 2025). Galleries were added in 1854. The church was declared redundant on 1 February 2006.

== Architecture ==
St John's is constructed in hammer-dressed sandstone with ashlar dressings and Welsh slate roofs. Its plan consists of a five-bay nave, a short chancel with a vestry at the east, and a west tower. The chancel is described as "a mere alcove without an arch". The tower is in four stages with angle buttresses and a west door. Above the door is a three-light window. The third stage contains clock faces, and in the top stage are two-light louvred bell openings. The parapet is embattled. The bays of the nave are divided by buttresses, each bay containing a two-light window with Y-tracery. The east window of the chancel has three lights. An embattled parapet runs along the top of the nave. At the corners of the nave and the chancel are octagonal buttresses rising to pointed finials. Inside the church there are galleries on three sides that are supported by thin iron columns.

The two-manual organ was made in 1836 by Samuel Renn. It was enlarged in 1909 by Nicholson and Lord. Since then, Jardine rebuilt the organ in about 1932, and renovated it in 1980. The organ has been restored and is now installed at St George's church, Nailsworth (more details can be found on St George's parish website).

The peal of eight bells from St John's were renovated and are now installed at St Thomas's Church at Stockton Heath in Warrington. Two new bells were added and the new peal rang for the first time at St Thomas's on 8 January 2017 at a dedication service conducted by the Bishop of Chester.

== External features ==
The churchyard contains the war graves of 15 Commonwealth service personnel, 13 from the First World War, and two from World War II, most of which are in an extension of the churchyard. Details of all burials and memorials in the churchyard can be found at the parish website Burials and Memorials.

== See also ==
- List of Commissioners' churches in Northeast and Northwest England
- Listed buildings in Bollington
