= Clarence Mill =

Cotton spinning mill in Cheshire, England

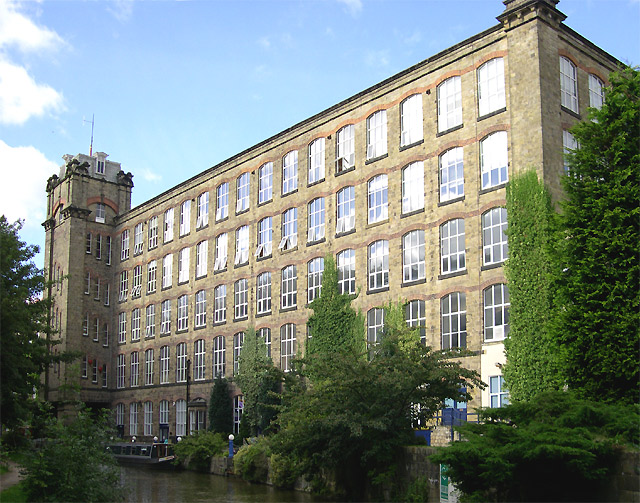
- The mill in 2007

- Location in Cheshire

Spinning (mule mill)
- Structural system: 1841 Fireproof ground floor (blowing room); 1854 Fireproof throughout 1877 Mill, Stotts 1871 patent double brick arch in rolled iron beams
- Location: Bollington, Cheshire, England
- Serving canal: Macclesfield Canal
- Serving railway: Manchester, Sheffield and Lincolnshire Railway 1872, North Staffordshire Railway; Marple to Macclesfield Branch
- Owner: Martin Swindell
- Further ownership: Swindells & Brooke George Swindells & Co (); Fine Cotton Spinners and Doublers Association Ltd (1898)
- Current tenants: Apartments
- Coordinates: 53.3008°N 2.1005°W

Construction
- Built: 1834, 1841, 1856, 1877
- Floor count: 5

Design team
- Architecture Firm: (1877 mill) A H Stott & Son

Power
- Date: 1841, 1877
- Engine maker: (1877) W & J Galloway & Sons
- Installed horse power (ihp): (1877)700

Equipment
- Date: 1877 & various
- Manufacturer: Asa Lees
- Cotton count: Fine for lace
- Mule Frames: 53000 spindles (1939); 27000 ring doublers(1939)

References
- Calladine & Fricker 1993, p. 107; Holden 1998, p. 218

Clarence Mill is a five-storey former cotton spinning mill in Bollington, Cheshire, in England. It was built between 1834 and 1877 for the Swindells family of Bollington. It was built alongside the Macclesfield Canal, which opened in 1831.

== Location ==
Clarence Mill was built alongside the Macclesfield Canal, on Clarence Road to the north of the village of Bollington. It is approximately 15 miles (24 km) south of Manchester by road.

== History ==
The Swindells family dominated cotton spinning in Bollington. The operated or owned Ingersley Vale Mill from 1821 and Rainow Mill from 1822, both until 1841. They were at the Higher and Lower Mill from 1832 until 1859 and at the Waterhouse Mill from 1841. They built the Clarence Mill with their partners the Brooke family in 1834, and extended it in 1841, 1854 and 1877. The Greg family from Quarry Bank Mill and later Reddish bought the Lower House Mill in 1832. The Swindells went on to build the Adelphi Mill in 1856.

== Architecture ==
The 1834 mill consisted of an engine house with detached chimney, a five-storey spinning mill and a two-storey 60m by 11m weaving shed. The weaving shed housed 320 looms arranged in rows of four across the building. These consisted of one loom 2.7 m wide and three 2.1 m wide with a central 0.9 m alley and two wall alleys of 0.4 m. The spinning mill housed twelve mules with 6000 spindles, a mixture of hand-operated mules and self-actors. Self-actors could not produce the finest counts at this time. The floor separation is 3.2 m. This mill was demolished to make way for the 1877 Stott mill.

In 1841 a further five-storey spinning mill was added, an identical weaving shed, a new boiler house and second chimney, and a gas retort. This was 20 bays long and built to house eight pairs of spinning mules on the third and fourth storey. It was of hammer-dressed sandstone with green and Welsh slate roof.

Another 15-bay spinning mill was added in 1854, with a door lintel inscribed "BROOKS SWINDELLS 1854". This mill was 16 m wide, allowing it to house state-of-the-art self acting mules with the maximum number of spindles. Two years later Adelphi Mill was built at 26 m, to house even larger mules.

The 1877, Oldham-style, spinning mill was five storeys high built on a basement with a hipped mansard roof. It was built of yellow sandstone with decorative courses of red Accrington brick. It had a floor separation of 4.1 m and was 16 bays long and 55 m and 40 m wide with a six-stage water tower and stair column on one corner. The other corners had clasping pilasters behind which were the urinals. This wide mill was designed using Stott 1871 patent for fireproof construction. The cast-iron columns did not support each longitudinal rolled-iron beam, but supported a capital that held a cross beam. It was placed in the centre of every second arch. Thus the span of 1.53 m allowed the floor placing of the columns to be at 3.2 m. This accommodated the longer and wider mules of the time. On each floor there were eight pairs of 1,050-spindle mules. The rigid box frame of columns, beams and cross beams was lighter and stronger than previous methods and barely need any load-bearing support from the exterior walls, so the windows could become larger allowing sufficient light to penetrate to the centre of the 40 m mill. The 1914 chimney was round, though there were two other detached chimneys from earlier phases.

=== Power ===
The 1877 Stott mill was powered by a pair of 700 hp W & J Galloway & Sons compound engine with a pair of 500 hp condensing beam engines using a Green's economiser on each. In 1835, they had calculated that they needed 32 hp to drive their 320 looms, 25 hp to drive their 6400 throstle spindles and 17 hp to drive their 8640 mule spindles – 74 hp in all. In 1841 they doubled the capacity of the mill and bought an extra two 40 hp engines.

=== Equipment ===
The 1877 Stott mill used Asa Lees spinning mules.

== Former usage ==
Clarence Mill was used for spinning finer counts of Sea Island cotton, for lace.

=== Owners ===
The Swindells, and to a lesser extent the Gregs, dominated the mid-century textile industry in Bollington. Martins Swindells' father, Francis (1763–1823), ran away from his Disley home in 1779, and became successful in London. He returned to Stockport where he and his brother became cotton manufacturers. Martin (1763–1823) ran many of the Bollington mills, and moved to Pott Hall, Pott Shrigley, to be closer to the business in 1830. He was a proprietor of the Macclesfield Canal, which opened in 1831, and built Clarence Mill alongside it in 1834. He was totally dependent on the canal to move in his raw cotton and coal, and to take away his finished cloth. From the start, Clarence Mill was a combined mill doing the spinning, weaving and finishing. His daughter Annie married Joseph Brookes. On his death his son Martin (1814–1880) succeeded him and formed a partnership with Joseph Brookes and they just ran Clarence Mill – though later Martin and his brother George built the Adelphi Mill. These mills were privately financed. The Swindells did not build tied cottages for their workers, but were generous benefactors of the local Methodist church. Joint stock companies that limited the capital at risk appeared in East Cheshire around 1866, when Samuel Greg and Company was formed. Brookes Swindells and Company Ltd was formed in 1876 and this enabled the financing of the 1877 expansion. 12000 £10 shares were floated but the company was not successful; this was blamed on managers not having the same incentive to succeed. While the Lancashire Cotton industry prospered until 1926, 1877 was the turning point in Bollington. The mill was now taken over by George Swindells and Co, and in 1898 became part of the Fine Cotton Spinners and Doublers Association Ltd that had been pioneered by Horrocks of Preston in 1887. Swindells specialised to survive and like Thomas Oliver and Son concentrated on spinning extremely fine cotton counts for lace and muslins, and in 1940 was spinning 'Sylex', a cotton yarn so fine it was comparable to silk. The Cotton Spinning Industry Act (1936) encouraged the Fine Cotton Spinners and Doublers Association to diversify, and Clarence Mill started to spin silk, while the Adelphi went over to silk completely, having 25000 silk-twisting spindles. At Quarry Bank Mill, the Gregs abandoned spinning in 1894, and installed 465 looms and 109 Northrops; Quarry Bank Mill continues today as a textile museum. The textile industry finished in Cheshire in the mid-1970s, though Clarence Mill and Adelphi Mill have survived: today they contain offices and Clarence Mill houses the Bollington Civic Trust Heritage Centre, now known as Bollington Discovery Centre.

=== Related structures ===
Limefield house was built for Joseph Brooke c. 1830. Grade II Listed.

Rock Bank house was built for Martin Swindell c. 1840. Grade II Listed.

Clarence Mill footbridge over the Macclesfield Canal was built in 2009. When planning permission was granted for the mill to be converted into apartments, a Section 106 agreement required the sum of £30,000 to be set aside to build a footbridge.

== Current usage ==
Today, the Clarence Mill houses a mix of businesses including a cafe called Café Waterside, a gallery called Northern Makes, an upholstery shop, a bicycle repair shop, and the Bollington Discovery Centre, a heritage museum focused on the local history of the area; essentially serving as a commercial space with a focus on local businesses and a heritage aspect within the building itself.

There are also apartments within the building too.

== See also ==
- Textile manufacturing
- Listed buildings in Bollington
