= James Cragg =

English cricketer

Personal information
- Full name: James Stanley Cragg
- Born: 18 October 1886; Stockport, Cheshire, England
- Died: 27 July 1979 (aged 92); Manchester, England
- Batting: Right-handed
- Relatives: Richard Cragg (grandson)

Domestic team information
- Years: Team
- 1912–1923: Cheshire
- 1908: Lancashire

Career statistics
Competition	First-class
Matches	1
Runs scored	10
Batting average	5.00
100s/50s	–/–
Top score	9
Balls bowled
Wickets
Bowling average
5 wickets in innings
10 wickets in match
Best bowling
Catches/stumpings
- Source: Cricinfo, 18 September 2012

James Stanley Cragg (18 October 1886 – 27 July 1979) was an English cricketer. Cragg was a right-handed batsman. He was born at Stockport, Cheshire.

== Professional career ==
Cragg made a single first-class appearance for Lancashire against Worcestershire at New Road, Worcester, in the 1908 County Championship. Lancashire won the toss and elected to bat first, making 217 all out, with Cragg opening the batting and scoring a single run before he was dismissed by Robert Burrows.

Worcestershire then made 362 all out in their first-innings, to which Lancashire responded to in their second-innings by making 378 all out, with Cragg this time batting at number six, from where he scored 9 runs before he was dismissed by Ted Arnold. Worcestershire reached their target of 233 with nine wickets to spare. This was his only major appearance for Lancashire. He later joined Cheshire, making his debut for the county in the 1912 Minor Counties Championship against Northumberland.

He made three further appearances for the county in that season, before returning to play for it after World War I. He made a single Minor Counties Championship appearance in 1920 against Glamorgan, before making a single appearance the following season against the Lancashire Second XI. His final appearance came in 1923 against the same opposition.

== Death ==
He died at Manchester, on 27 July 1979.
