= List of textile mills in Cheshire =

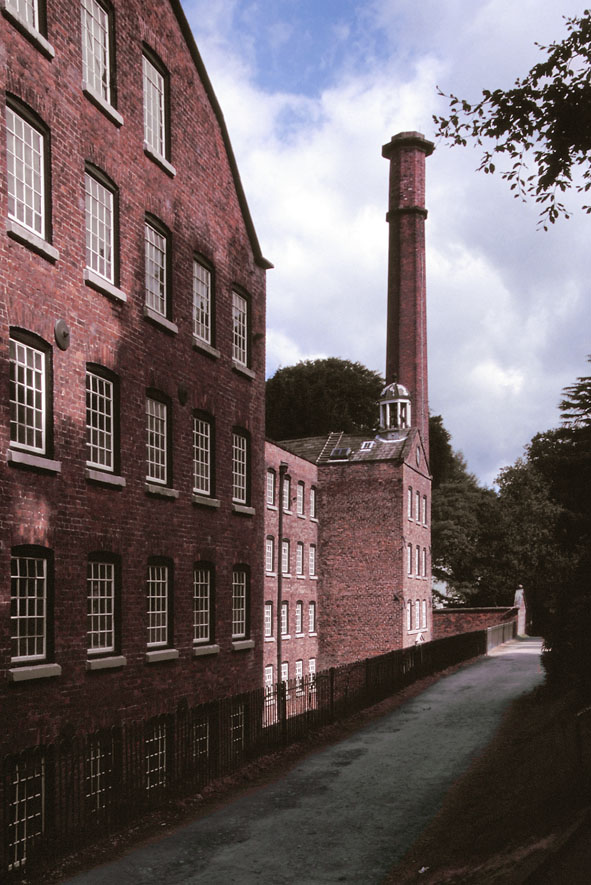
Quarry Bank Mill

This is a list of the silk, cotton and other textile mills in Cheshire, England. The first mills were built in the 1760s, in Styal by Samuel Greg using the Arkwright system and were powered by the water of the River Bollin. There were significant early cotton mills; Cheshire was an important centre of the silk industry. Parts of Cheshire have been subsumed into Stockport and Tameside.

== River Bollin ==
=== Styal ===
Name	Architect	Location	Built	Demolished	Served (Years)
Quarry Bank Mill		SJ834830 53°20′38″N 2°15′04″W	1784	Standing	175
	Notes: This is one of the best preserved textile mills of the Industrial Revolution and is now a museum of the cotton industry. It has been designated by English Heritage as a Grade II* listed building. The mill was founded by Samuel Greg in 1784 in the village of Styal on the River Bollin. Its original iron water wheel was designed by Thomas Hewes and built between 1816 and 1820. The over head shafts above the machines were attached to the water wheel by a belt. When the water wheel turned, the motion moved the belt and powered the machine.				

=== Macclesfield ===
Name	Architect	Location	Built	Demolished	Served (Years)
Albert Mill		SJ 9224 7399 53°15′46″N 2°07′04″W	1840		186
	Notes: This mill was erected by the Brocklehursts when they diversified into silk spinning and power weaving.				
Albion Mill		London Road SJ919729 53°15′11″N 2°07′23″W			
	Notes:				
Alma Mill		Crompton Road SJ 9106 7357 53°15′33″N 2°08′08″W			
	Notes:				
Alma Mill		Pickford St. 53°15′27″N 2°07′17″W			
	Notes:				
Arbourhay Street Mill		SJ 9220 7403 53°15′48″N 2°07′06″W	1811–31		
	Notes: Pedimented Mill				
Athey Street Mill		SJ 9126 7347 53°15′30″N 2°07′57″W			
Bank Street Works		SJ 9200 7315 53°15′19″N 2°07′17″W			
Bank Top Mill		SJ 9223 7319 53°15′21″N 2°07′04″W			
Barn Street Mill		unsited			
Bollinside Mill		SJ 9197 7331 53°15′24″N 2°07′18″W			
Bridge Street Mill		SJ 9142 7334 53°15′25″N 2°07′48″W	1811–31		
	Notes: Pedimented Mill				
Brook Mill		53°15′21″N 2°07′08″W			
Brookside Mill		SJ 9200 7332 53°15′24″N 2°07′17″W			
	Notes:				
Brook Street Mills		SJ 9220 7328 53°15′23″N 2°07′06″W			
	Notes:				
Brown Street Mill		Brown St SJ 9145 7311 53°15′18″N 2°07′47″W			
	1206884Notes:				
Brunswick Mill		Pickford St 53°15′28″N 2°07′30″W			
	Notes:				
Buckley Street Mill		SJ 9152 7305 53°15′16″N 2°07′43″W			
	Notes:				
Byron House		London Road SJ919729 53°14′55″N 2°07′17″W			
	Notes:				
Catherine Street Mill		SJ 9152 7305 53°15′16″N 2°07′43″W			
Chapel Mill		53°15′20″N 2°07′18″W			
	Notes:				
Charles Street Mill		SJ 9165 7334 53°15′25″N 2°07′36″W			
19 Charles Street		SJ 916 734 53°15′29″N 2°07′37″W			
Charlotte Street		SJ 9185 7336 53°15′26″N 2°07′25″W			
Chestergate Mill		SJ9135 7362 53°15′34″N 2°07′52″W			
Clough Mill		SJ 9212 7306 53°15′16″N 2°07′11″W			
Commercial Road Mill		SJ 9195 7377 53°15′39″N 2°07′20″W			
Commercial Road/Queen Street Mill		SJ9195 7377 53°15′39″N 2°07′20″W			
Commongate Mill		SJ 9210 7364 53°15′35″N 2°07′12″W			
Croft Mill		SJ 9153 7353 53°15′31″N 2°07′42″W			
Crompton Road Mill		SJ911736 53°15′32″N 2°08′06″W			
	Notes:				
Cuckstool Pit Hill Mill		SJ 920 736 53°15′32″N 2°07′16″W			
Dale Street Mill		SJ 9230 7349 53°15′30″N 2°07′01″W			
Davenport Street Silk Machinery Factory Mill		SJ 9205 7345 53°15′29″N 2°07′14″W			
Depot Mill		SJ 9176 7334 53°15′25″N 2°07′30″W			
Dog Lane Mill		SJ 9165 7368 53°15′36″N 2°07′36″W			
Duke Street Mill		SJ 9173 7331 53°15′24″N 2°07′31″W			
11 Duke Street		SJ 916 734 53°15′29″N 2°07′37″W			
Elizabeth Street Mill		SJ9152 7332 53°15′24″N 2°07′43″W			
	Notes:				
Exchange Mill		SJ916 735 53°15′29″N 2°07′37″W			
Fud Shop		SJ9205 7394 53°15′45″N 2°07′14″W			
George Street Mill		SJ919729 53°15′11″N 2°07′23″W			
	Notes:				
George Street New Mill		SJ9195 7336 53°15′26″N 2°07′20″W			
	Notes:				
Goodall Street Mill		SJ 9228 7326 53°15′23″N 2°07′02″W			
Gosling's, Mill		Pickford Street, SJ9180 7342 53°15′28″N 2°07′28″W			
Great King Street Mill		SJ9150 7357 53°15′33″N 2°07′44″W			
Green Street Mill		SJ9208 7343 53°15′28″N 2°07′13″W			
Grosvenor Street Mills		SJ 913 738 53°15′40″N 2°07′55″W			
Gutters Mill		SJ9183 7373 53°15′38″N 2°07′26″W			
Henderson Street Mill		SJ9135 7338 53°15′27″N 2°07′52″W			
	Notes:				
Hibel Road Mill		SJ9205 7398 53°15′46″N 2°07′14″W			
Hines Factory		SJ920 730 53°15′14″N 2°07′16″W			
Hope Mill A & B		SJ 9157 7327 53°15′23″N 2°07′40″W			
Hurdsfield Road Mills		SJ9220 7403 53°15′48″N 2°07′06″W			
Johnson's Mill		unsited			
Jordangate Mill		unsited			
Kershaw		53°15′28″N 2°07′53″W			
	Notes:				
King Edward Street Mill		SJ9142 7382 53°15′41″N 2°07′48″W			
	Notes:				
30a King Edward Street		SJ 9154 7383 53°15′41″N 2°07′42″W			
King Street Mill		SJ9202 7379 53°15′40″N 2°07′16″W			
Knight's Mill		SJ922 731 53°15′18″N 2°07′05″W			
	Notes:				
Knight Street Mill		53°15′18″N 2°07′05″W			
	Notes:				
Lansdowne Street Mills		SJ9220 7403 53°15′48″N 2°07′06″W			
Little Street Mill		SJ9148 7304 53°15′15″N 2°07′45″W			
London Road Mills		SJ 920 724 53°14′56″N 2°07′16″W			
	Notes:				
Lowe Street Mill		SJ9194 7304 53°15′15″N 2°07′20″W			
Lower Beech Mill		unsited			
Lower Exchange Street B & F Mill		SJ9179 7347 53°15′30″N 2°07′28″W			
Lower Heyes Mill		SJ9194 7425 53°15′55″N 2°07′20″W			
Mill Street Mill		unsited			
Newgate Mill		SJ916 734 53°15′29″N 2°07′37″W			
Oxford Road Mill		SJ909735 53°15′29″N 2°08′17″W			
	Notes:				
Paradise Mills		SJ918732 53°15′22″N 2°07′26″W	1860	Standing	166
	Notes: Built around 1860. The mill was operated by Cartwright and Sheldon silk weavers from 1912 until 1981. It is now a museum displaying mill life in the 1930s, and 26 Jacquard Looms.				
Paradise Street Garret Loom Shops		53°15′23″N 2°07′46″W			
	Notes: This is a row of terraced houses each with a loom shop in the garret. Families used to enter the garret through a trap door				
Park Green Mill		SJ919732 53°15′22″N 2°07′23″W			
	Notes:				
Park Lane Mill		53°15′22″N 2°07′31″W	1811–31		
	Notes: Pedimented Mill+				
Park Mill		SJ9165 7279 53°15′08″N 2°07′36″W	1852		174
	Notes: Pedimented Mill				
Parr Street Shirt Mill		SJ9113 7349 53°15′30″N 2°08′04″W			
Peel Street Mill		SJ9170 7273 53°15′05″N 2°07′33″W			
Pickford Street Mills		Pickford St. 53°15′27″N 2°07′21″W			
	Notes: Including Pickford Street 'Á' Mill, Pickford Street 'B' Mill, Pickford Street Mill, Pickford Street New Mill 'B',				
Pioneer Mill		SJ 9188 7336 53°15′26″N 2°07′24″W			
Pleasant Street Mill		SJ 9259 7425 53°15′55″N 2°06′45″W			
Pool Street Mill		SJ 9204 7289 53°15′11″N 2°07′15″W			
Progress Mill		53°15′20″N 2°07′28″W			
Regency Mill		Chester Road, 53°15′35″N 2°08′16″W	1821–31		
	Notes: Four storey pedimented Mill, aka Regency Mill. It was a steam-powered integrated mill including dyeing. The original occupiers were Hapgood and Parker. The steam engine produced 12hp. The main block is 37.5 x 8.00m., the floor separation being 3.00 m.				
Rowbotham's Mill		SJ9203 7394 53°15′45″N 2°07′15″W			
Royal Button Mill		SJ 9194 7270 53°15′05″N 2°07′20″W			
	Notes: Pedimented Mill				
Royal Court Mill		53°15′25″N 2°07′19″W			
	Notes:				
Royal Depot Mills		SJ 9176 7334 53°15′25″N 2°07′30″W	1744		282
	Notes: 1744 Charles Roe built this mill in 1744 specifically to house Italian throwing machines which could produce organzine. Lombes patent on this device had expired in 1732, Logwood Mill in Stockport (then Cheshire) was built that year and Royal Button Mill was the second constructed in Cheshire.				
Royal George Mills		SJ9134 7378 53°15′39″N 2°07′53″W			
Royal Silk Warehouse		SJ9188 7375 53°15′39″N 2°07′24″W			
	Notes: Extended and converted to a Travelodge Budget Hotel				
Ryle Street Mill		SJ9209 7348 53°15′30″N 2°07′12″W			
St George's Street Mill		SJ9193 7285 53°15′09″N 2°07′21″W			
3 St Georges St		SJ 9180 7310 53°15′17″N 2°07′28″W			
Samuel Street Mill		SJ9173 7326 53°15′23″N 2°07′31″W			
Short Street Mill		SJ9184 7365 53°15′35″N 2°07′26″W			
5 Short St		SJ 9184 7365 53°15′35″N 2°07′26″W			
Silk Street Mill		SJ916 734 53°15′29″N 2°07′37″W			
Smales Mill		??53°15′26″N 2°07′24″W			
	Notes:				
Soho Mill		SJ922 728 53°15′07″N 2°07′05″W			
Spring Gardens Mill		SJ916 745 53°16′01″N 2°07′37″W			
Stanley Street Mill		SJ9159 7373 53°15′38″N 2°07′39″W			
Sunderland Street Mill	Owner; Pearson Family	SJ 9192 7348 53°15′30″N 2°07′21″W			
47 Sunderland St		SJ 9189 7310 53°15′17″N 2°07′23″W			
Sunderland Street 'Slipper' Mill		SJ 9192 7352 53°15′31″N 2°07′21″W			
Sunnyside Mill		SJ 9192 7352 53°15′31″N 2°07′21″W			
Sutton Mill		SJ 9198 7276 53°15′06″N 2°07′18″W			
	Notes:				
Thorp Street Gas Mill		SJ 9198 7387 53°15′42″N 2°07′18″W	1827	reduced in height in 1977	150
	Notes: Pedimented Mill				
Thorp Street Leather Mill		SJ 9194 7395 53°15′45″N 2°07′20″W			
Thorp Street Stoneley's Mill		SJ 9196 7389 53°15′43″N 2°07′19″W			
Townley Street Mill		53°15′25″N 2°07′24″W			
	Notes:				
Union Mill		Elizabeth Street. 53°15′21″N 2°07′46″W	1811–31		
	Notes: Pedimented Mill- location uncertain, as the name is used by several mills. +				
Union Street Mill		53°15′24″N 2°07′41″W	1890		
	Notes: Now a carpet warehouse, brick built on a grit-stone base+				
Victoria		Hursfield, 53°15′15″N 2°07′15″W	1830–40,1880–1890		
Victoria Mills		SJ 9205 7300 53°15′14″N 2°07′14″W	1823	Standing	203
	Notes: Victoria Mills, Cross Street, Windmill Street. Built for Winkworth and Proctor. The central block was from 1823, the big mill was 1837, and to the left of the chimney is the 1870 mill.				
Vincent Street Mill		SJ 9167 7315 53°15′19″N 2°07′35″W			
Vincent Street New Mill		SJ 9311 9162 53°25′17″N 2°06′18″W			
Wardle Street Mill		53°15′21″N 2°07′31″W	1811–31		
	Notes: Pedimented Mill+				
Waterloo Street Mill		SJ 919 737 53°15′36″N 2°07′23″W			
Waters Green (Hadfields) Mill		SJ 9202 7379 53°15′40″N 2°07′16″W			
Waters Green		53°15′33″N 2°07′23″W			
	Notes: Including: Waters Green Mill, Waters Green Mill 'A', Waters Green Mill 'B', Waters Green New Mill. Pedimented Mill				
Waterside Mill		SJ 921 731 53°15′18″N 2°07′12″W			
Wellington Mill		SJ 918 735 53°15′29″N 2°07′26″W			
Whiston Street Mill		SJ9118 7338 53°15′27″N 2°08′01″W			
Whitening Croft Mill		SJ 9304 7383 53°15′41″N 2°06′21″W			
Wilshaw Mill		SJ920724 53°14′56″N 2°07′16″W			
Wood Street Mill		SJ 9175 7337 53°15′26″N 2°07′30″W			
	Notes:				

== River Dean ==
=== Bollington ===
The Swindells family dominated cotton spinning in Bollington. They operated or owned Ingersley Vale Mill from 1821, Rainow Mill from 1822 both until 1841. They built the Clarence Mill with their partners the Brooke family in 1834, and extended it in 1841, 1854 and 1877. Thomas Oliver & Sons were at the Higher and Lower Mill from 1832 until 1859 and at the Waterhouse Mill from 1841. The Greg family from Quarry Bank Mill and later Reddish leased the Lower House Mill in 1832. The Swindells went on to build the Adelphi Mill in 1856.

Name	Architect	Location	Built	Demolished	Served (Years)
Adelphi Mill		SJ930773 53°17′35″N 2°06′22″W			
	1242941Notes: Adelphi Mill was constructed c. 1868 by Martin Swindells, a local cotton spinner who also owned Clarence Mill in Bollington, he built The Adelphi Mill for his two sons, hence the name 'Adelphi', which is Greek for brothers. It is now converted to offices.Adelphi Mill				
Clarence Mill		Clarence Brow SJ934782 53°18′04″N 2°06′00″W			
	1138958Notes: The Swindells family built the Clarence Mill with their partners the Brooke family in 1834, and extended it in 1841, 1854 and 1877.				
Defiance Mill		SJ9373 7798 53°17′55″N 2°05′44″W			
	Notes: The mill stands and is now in residential use.				
Higher Mill		SJ939776 53°17′42″N 2°05′35″W			
Lower Mill		SJ938777 53°17′46″N 2°05′38″W			
Lowerhouse Mill		SJ922777 53°17′46″N 2°07′05″W	1818		208
	1138987Notes: Built in 1818 for George Antrobus and leased in 1832 to Samuel Greg, who added the steam engine house c.1835. The mill is still in industrial use manufacturing coated papers.				
Oak Bank Print Works		SJ9380 7790 53°17′53″N 2°05′40″W			
Sowcar Mill		SJ9425 7803 53°17′57″N 2°05′16″W			
Turner Heath Mill		SJ928 768 53°17′17″N 2°06′32″W			
Waterhouse Mill		SJ9293 7785 53°17′51″N 2°06′27″W	1791	1962	169
	Notes: The Firm of "Thomas Oliver & Sons" began, in what was known as "The Bollington Mills" i.e. the "Higher Mill" formerly a Brewery, and the "Lower Mill" afterwards a paper mill. These were leased from Mr Harrop of Stockport, and Mr Creswick of Sheffield, both solicitors. Waterhouse Mill was built in 1790 by Peter Lomas, and acquired by the Olivers through marriage to Mary Lomas. It took water by a leat from the River Dean weir to a mill pond which drove a 23 ft waterwheel, the water passed through a sough (culvert) back into river at the Garden Street bridge.. The first mill burnt down in 1799 and was rebuilt in 1800 and enlarged in 1838. The mills started with jennies, then by 1799 were ordering mules with 216 spindles. The firm produced the finest cotton counts by 1860, they were spinning 220s, and by 1886 420s. In this year ring doubling was introduced. Power was initially by water but a supplementary beam engine was added- and these were replaced in 1906 by a Musgraves horizontal. In 1898 Thomas Oliver & Sons became a part of The Fine Spinners & Doublers Association which was set up to enable cotton mills to trade collectively and benefit from the increased scale. They owned the trademark Happy Valley, and during the First World War made fabric for aeroplane wings and before the second war the thread used for the sports clothes of the England Cricket Team during an Ashes tour to Australia.				

=== Rainow ===
Name	Architect	Location	Built	Demolished	Served (Years)
Brookhouse Clough Mill		SJ 9476 7512			
Brookhouse Mill		SJ 9461 7523			
Cow Lane Mill		SJ 9457 7580			
Gin Clough Mill		SJ958764 53°17′06″N 2°03′50″W			
	1136715Notes: Water-powered mill built in 1794 probably to house spinning jennies. It was financed in 1807 with a loan from the Macclesfield silk manufacturer, John Brocklehurst. And expanded again in 1820.				
Hough Hole Mill		SJ944766 53°17′10″N 2°05′06″W			
Ingersley Vale Works		SJ942744 53°16′01″N 2°05′17″W			
	Notes: A cotton spinning mill in 1792 was water powered. The lodge was enlarged, creating Clough Pool in 1803 by Edward Collier. This powered two waterwheels placed above each other. An 18hp steam engine was also present. The mill changed ownership in 1811 and was damaged by fire in 1819. The buildings on the site at this time included a spinning block, owner's house, a warehouse, a smithy and a apprentices house for paupers. The mill was rebuilt by August 1821 by Thomas Gaskell of Ingersley Hall who became a partner with Martin Swindells. By 1826, there were 330 power looms. The Swindells took full control of the site in 1830. In 1842 when James Leigh took over and cotton spinning ceased. The buildings were converted to printing calico, the wheelhouse was rebuilt and a single 56 feet (17 m) diameter wheel was installed, the second largest in Britain. By 1874, the mill had converted to a dyeworks. A J King ran a bleachworks between 1878 and 1929. The first floor of the spinning mill was removed and in 1895, the water wheel was converted to drive a dynamo and all the processes were powered by electric motors. In the later 20th century, the site was sold to Slater, Harrison & Co. and used as letterpress and litho printworks. A fire in November 1999 destroyed the roof and floors of the original mill building and it is currently under restoration.				
Ingersley Hall Mill ??					
Lowerhouse Mill		SJ 9538 7656			
Millbrook Mill		SJ 9489 7575			
Rainow Mill		SJ914775 53°17′38″N 2°07′48″W			
	Notes: Founded by Martin Swindells and John and Thomas Fernley in 1822.				
Springbank Mill		SJ 9451 7518			
Tower Hill Mill		SJ946758 53°16′44″N 2°04′55″W			
Waulk Mill ??					

== River Dane ==
=== Congleton ===
Congleton had England's third oldest silk-throwing mill and spun both cotton and silk. Its prosperity depended on tariffs imposed on imported silk. When the tariffs were removed in the 1860s, the empty mills moved over to fustian cutting. A limited silk ribbon weaving industry survived into the 20th century, and woven labels were still being produced to the 1990s. Many mills survive, as industrial or units.

Name	Architect	Location	Built	Demolished	Served (Years)
Albany Mill		SJ8614625553°09′36″N 2°12′31″W			
Albert Mill		SJ8644630553°09′52″N 2°12′15″W		standing	
Bank Mill		SJ8689634353°10′04″N 2°11′51″W		standing	
Bath Vale Mill		SJ873633 53°10′01″N 2°11′28″W			
	Notes: Conder & Company				
Booth Street Mill		SJ8543629553°09′49″N 2°13′10″W			
Booth Street Mill (2)		SJ8544629853°09′49″N 2°13′09″W			
Bridge Mill		SJ8578633153°10′00″N 2°12′51″W			
	Notes: Built for fustian, used later for paper, printed-circuit boards and a carpet warehouse.				
Bridge Street Mill		SJ8578628753°09′46″N 2°12′51″W			
Bromley Road Mill		SJ8651630553°09′52″N 2°12′12″W			
Brook Mills		SJ8583631353°09′54″N 2°12′48″W			
	Notes: aka Solly's Mill, Bossons' Mill, Reade and Company Silk Spinners. Brook Mills and the Stonehouse Green Mill formed a group on the Howty Brook as it approached the River Dane. They came into joint ownership in 1852. Brook Mills started as a cotton spinning and silk throwing and weaving site in the late 18th Century. The five storey building, constructed in 1835, was used for Jacquard weaving. Stonehouse Green Mill was used for short-silk and cotton spinning, but by 1853 the buildings were used for long-silk spinning. The Reade family was established as cotton manufacturers in Congleton by the end of the 18th century. George Reade d 1837 moved into silk spinning early in the 19th century; George Reade and Son, silk men and silk throwsters, are recorded in Pigot's Directory of 1822. By 1833, the Company's business was described as silk spinners, at Stonehouse Green. In 1834, 3 of his sons established the business of Reade Brothers and Co, silk throwsters and manufacturers of silk goods, also at Stonehouse Green. By 1846 the business was described as silk spinning and working of waste silks. Folkspeare used the mill for tie manufacture from 1941. By 1850 the Reade family ceased to be involved in the business and the name of the firm was changed to Reade and Co in 1852. National Archives. WH Bossons Ltd occupied and then owned all of the Brook Mills buildings from 1949 to 1997 to manufacture plaster cast figures which were exported all over the world. The smaller and earlier of the two mill buildings lost its historic importance when converted into apartments. The larger 1835 mill was badly neglected for many years, and was eventually demolished leaving only the unique 'drop-shute' toilet to stand as a reminder of this historic building.				
Brookside Mill		SJ858632 53°09′58″N 2°12′50″W		demolished	
	Notes: See:Brook Mills				
Canal Street Mill		SJ8652621253°09′22″N 2°12′11″W			
Cross Street Mill		SJ8573630853°09′53″N 2°12′54″W			
	Notes: A silk throwing mill converted to fustian cutting then used as a cinema, and a garage.				
Dane Mill		SJ 8540 6340 53°10′08″N 2°13′37″W			
	Notes: Bought by the Pearsons in 1830.				
Dane Mill (Slate's)		SJ8565632153°09′57″N 2°12′58″W			
Danebridge Mill		SJ8586623853°09′30″N 2°12′46″W			
	Notes: Now demolished. The first mill was described in 1831: All that excellent silk mill the property of James Pattison Esq., called New Mill situate on South side of the Bridge over the River Dane in Congleton aforesaid with the engine house adjoining thereto and a capital steam engine of 8 horse power. A part of this mill 48' 9¨ long by 27'4" wide is five storeys in height and other parts of the respective lengths of 31'3¨ by 23' 3¨ and 23' 2¨ by 21' wide are three storeys in height. There is also a building adjoining and connecting with the mill of 3 storeys in height and measuring 26' 6" long by 17' 9" wide. The second mill had a larger footprint but was only 3 storeys. It was owned by Dennis Bradwell from c1850-1875. The mill was from 1890, a fustian cutting mill, and remained so up to 1934. The mill, however, was also occupied by Condura, a subsidiary company of Conlowe Ltd a limited liability company in 1930 (Congleton Chronicle 1932). The company known for 'Judy Frocks' occupied part of the mill, and initially employed around thirty people which grew to 100 people. By 1958, Conlowe companies were subsidiaries of the English Sewing Cotton Company,				
Daneside Mill		SJ8575632553°09′58″N 2°12′53″W		1910	
	Notes: Cotton, silk-throwing, silk-spinning and fustian cutting.				
Dane Street Mill		SJ8535631253°09′54″N 2°13′14″W			
Dane Row Mills??		SJ 896657 53°11′17″N 2°09′25″W			
Dane Valley Mill		SJ 86737 63802 53°10′16″N 2°11′59″W			
Dane in Shaw Mill		SJ883620 53°09′18″N 2°10′34″W	1784		242
	Notes: aka Martin's Mill. Symmetrical eighteen bay four storey mill, with pediment over centre two bays, internal waterwheel, clock face in pediment. Mill lodge in front. Built to spin cotton after Arkwright's water frame patent lapsed.				
Davenshaw Mill		Buglawton, SJ86606340 53°10′07″N 2°12′05″W			
Eaton Bank Mill		SJ86746386 53°10′18″N 2°11′59″W			
Edward Mill		SJ8646630553°09′52″N 2°12′14″W			
Elizabeth Mill		SJ8627630353°09′51″N 2°12′24″W			
	Notes: See Victoria Mill				
Fair Mill		Worrall Street SJ8597630853°09′53″N 2°12′41″W	1870	Standing	156
	Notes: Used for Fustian in the 1890s, and then for cardboard box manufacture- now a Medical practice. This two-storey building was typical of a fustian mill 8m wide by 49m with a clear uncluttered floor. The boards were 100mm thick. The roof was supported by a king post. The windows are wide with segmented brick arches.				
Flint Mill		Buglawton SJ8668637653°10′10″N 2°12′12″W			
	Notes: See Higher Washford Mill				
Forge Mill		SJ8490636053°10′09″N 2°13′38″W			
	Notes: Run by Peter Wild until 1952 when the firm downsized and moved to Leek.				
Foundry Mill		SJ862630 53°09′50″N 2°12′29″W			
Havannah St Mills		Eaton SJ 896657 53°11′17″N 2°09′25″W			
	Notes:				
Highbank Mill		SJ8627628153°09′44″N 2°12′24″W			
Higher Washford Mill		Buglawton SJ 8642 6357 53°10′10″N 2°12′12″W		standing	
	Notes: The central part, called the Flint Mill was built as a corn mill, then used as a silk mill (c 1828) before working commercially as a flint mill from c1864 until 1958. Dating from the late 18th century, and extended in early and mid nineteenth century, it contains with late 19th and earlier twentieth machinery that was driven by a breast shot cast-iron bucket waterwheel of 18 feet (5.5 m) diameter. Listed Building NGR: SJ8652563642 The power from the wheel was taken by shafts to the upper floors and to two adjacent textile mills.				
Kinsey Street Mill		SJ8605630153°09′50″N 2°12′36″W			
Lower Park Street Mill		SJ8614630153°09′50″N 2°12′32″W			
Lower Spragg Street Mill		SJ8630630053°09′50″N 2°12′23″W			
Meadow Mill		SJ860631 53°09′54″N 2°12′40″W			
	Notes: Built in 1864 for silk-throwing, Shephard's then used it for fustian cutting, then was used by Edgar Hallet & Co for making uniform braid. It is now residential.				
Moody Street Mill		SJ8587626653°09′39″N 2°12′46″W			
Old Mill		SJ859632 53°10′00″N 2°12′42″W	1750	2003	246
	Notes: Old Mill was an early silk mill established in the 1753. It used an internal water wheel to power Italian silk throwing machines. It was notable for its size, and for the involvement of James Brindley in its construction. The mill was extended and a beam engine added c.1830, but it was partially demolished in 1939. When, in 2003 the remaining structures were demolished a full archaeological survey was done. The first silk mill which is the largest and most conspicuous structure in Congleton, is built of brick, with a pediment containing the dialplate of a clock in the centre. It is 240 feet long, 24 feet wide and 48 feet high, consisting of five storeys, and is lighted by 390 windows: 1822. Eleven circular throwing machines were housed on the ground floor with winding machines above.In 1771 it employed 600. This was extended by another 17 bays in 1830. The Pearsons bought the mill from the Patinsons in 1830. In 1935 it suffered from subsidence, and Roldane Mill was built for some of the equipment. In 1939, the top three storeys were removed. It continued in use until 1996. It was demolished in 2003.				
Park Mill		SJ8625629653°09′49″N 2°12′26″W	1825		201
	Notes: Erected speculatively by 1825 by Charles Townley a builder. The design was the standard format at that time. It had 3 storeys with 15 bays.				
Park Street Mill		SJ862629 53°09′47″N 2°12′29″W			
Pool Bank Mill		SJ891629 53°09′47″N 2°09′50″W			
Primrose Vale Mill		SJ8717624153°09′31″N 2°11′36″W			
Prospect Mill		SJ8521629153°09′47″N 2°13′22″W			
Providence Mill		SJ8577632253°09′57″N 2°12′51″W	1913	standing	67
	Notes: Fustian cutting mill built in 1913, named because it had 13 steps and 13 windows but it would have tempted providence to change it. It was used later to manufacture children's clothing. It was used to print Bingo cards, became derelict in 2003 and has been converted to housing.				
Riverside Mill		SJ8595631153°09′54″N 2°12′42″W			
	Notes: Built in 1890 for James Collinge, fustian cutter. In 1906 Ansiamio used it to manufacture cigars. Later from the 1950s, it was used for garment manufacture.				
Roldane Mill		SJ8592634553°10′00″N 2°12′45″W			
	Notes: Built in 1934 adjacent to Old Mill for making up of knitted garments. The site is being developed for sheltered housing in 2012.				
Royle Street Mill 1		SJ85726327 53°10′05″N 2°12′54″W			
	Notes: 3 storey mill built by Thomas Vaudrey, used for silk and faustian. It was steam powered from 1826, and later reduced to two storeys and used as a snooker hall.				
Royle Street Mill 2		SJ85796335 53°10′05″N 2°12′54″W			
Salford Mill		Milk St SJ857634 53°10′05″N 2°12′54″W			
	1130470Notes: Built as a silk mill for Nathaniel Barton, and used as a fustian mill by Edward Knapper and others. It now houses Jantex Furnishings.				
Shepherd Mills		SJ8608630853°09′53″N 2°12′35″W	1890		136
	Notes: aka Perseverance Mill. This was built as a fustian mill and was used for shirt manufacture between 1906 and 1959, and for pyjamas from 1960 to 1998.				
Shop Lane Mill		SJ8650625053°09′34″N 2°12′12″W			
Silk Street Mill		SJ8549659553°11′25″N 2°13′07″W			
Silver Springs Mills		SJ89562753°09′40″N 2°09′29″W			
Spindle Street Mill		SJ8634629953°09′50″N 2°12′21″W			
Spragg Street Mill		SJ8632629553°09′49″N 2°12′22″W			
Stonehouse Green Mill		SJ8579 6301 53°09′50″N 2°12′50″W	1780s		
	Notes: Brook Mill and the Stone House Green Mill formed a group on the Howty Brook approached the River Dane. They came into joint ownership in 1852 Brook Mill started as silk throwing and weaving site, Stone House Green Mill was built to spin cotton after Arkwright's water frame patent lapsed and was used for both short-silk and cotton spinning, but by 1853 they were used for long-silk spinning. See: Brook Mills				
Sunnyside Mill		SJ8620625453°09′35″N 2°12′28″W			
Swan Bank Mill		SJ8541631153°09′54″N 2°13′11″W		1876	
	Notes: A stream driven mill employing 400. Destroyed in 1876				
Square Mill		SJ8591631153°09′54″N 2°12′44″W			
Thomas Street Mill		SJ8641 631153°09′54″N 2°12′17″W			
Throstles Nest Mill		SJ8664 635853°10′09″N 2°12′05″W			
Timbersbrook Mill		SJ896627 53°09′40″N 2°09′25″W			
Vale Mill		SJ8576 6270 53°09′40″N 2°12′52″W			
Victoria Mill		SJ8627 630353°09′51″N 2°12′24″W	1822	standing	165
	Notes: Built by John Hall, a silk-throwster in 1822.Berisford started here in 1872. Run by Berisfords, along with the neighbouring Century Mill weaving sheds, Elizabeth Mill.In 1987 it was turned over to retail.				
Victoria Street Mill		SJ85862953°09′47″N 2°12′50″W			
Wallworth Bank Mill		SJ8632627353°09′41″N 2°12′22″W			
Washford Mill		SJ8642635753°10′09″N 2°12′17″W			
Westfield Mill		SJ8522628453°09′45″N 2°13′21″W			
Worrall Street Mill		SJ861631 53°09′54″N 2°12′32″W			

== Kettleshulme ==
Name	Architect	Location	Built	Demolished	Served (Years)
Lumbhole Mill		SJ 9882 8038 53°19′13″N 2°01′09″W			
	Notes: The mill was built in 1797 and heightened in 1815 then destroyed by fire in 1822 and rebuilt. It was powered by a cast-iron suspension 7.6m diameter by 1.7m water wheel working in conjunction with a beam engine. The current combination dates from c 1835, though a 10 hp engine was in place in 1816, when Lumbhole mill was being used for silk manufacture by George Brocklehurst. Later it converted to cotton and was known for the production of candlewick by the Sheldon family. The mill was four-storey, 30 yards (27 m) by 11 yards (10 m), it was built from Millstone Grit and had a Queen Post Truss roof				

== Knutsford ==
Name	Architect	Location	Built	Demolished	Served (Years)
Silk Street Mill		SJ752 787 53.3047°N 2.3736°W			

== Warrington ==
Name	Architect	Location	Built	Demolished	Served (Years)
Cockhedge Mill		SJ609884 53°23′28″N 2°35′20″W	1831		195
	Notes: Cockhedge Mill was a large combined mill (spinning, calico weaving and dying) owned by Armitage and Rigby Ltd (1888). The buildings were commenced in late 1831, but a large fire on 18 June 1872 caused a rebuild. The article about the fire in the Illustrated London News. It was then a five-storey building employing 900 persons. The report said there were 14,000 throstle spindles and 21,000 mule spindles. The steam engine and 6,000 spindles were saved, and 420 people lost their jobs.				
Ashmore 1982, p. 66

== Prestbury ==
Name	Architect	Location	Built	Demolished	Served (Years)
Butley Mill		SJ89977453°23′28″N 2°35′20″W			

== See also ==
- List of mills in Longdendale and Glossopdale
- List of mills in Stockport
- Silk industry of Cheshire

== Bibliography ==
- Ashmore, Owen (1982). The industrial archaeology of North-west England. Manchester University Press. ISBN 0-7190-0820-4.
- Calladine, Anthony; Fricker, Jean (1993). East Cheshire Textile Mills. London: Royal Commission on Historical Monuments of England. ISBN 1-873592-13-2.
- Stephens, W. B. (1970). History of Congleton: Published to Celebrate the 700th Anniversary of the Granting of the Charter to the Town. Manchester University Press. ISBN 0-7190-1245-7.
