= Kerridge =

Village in Cheshire, England

Coordinates: 53.290°N 2.098°W

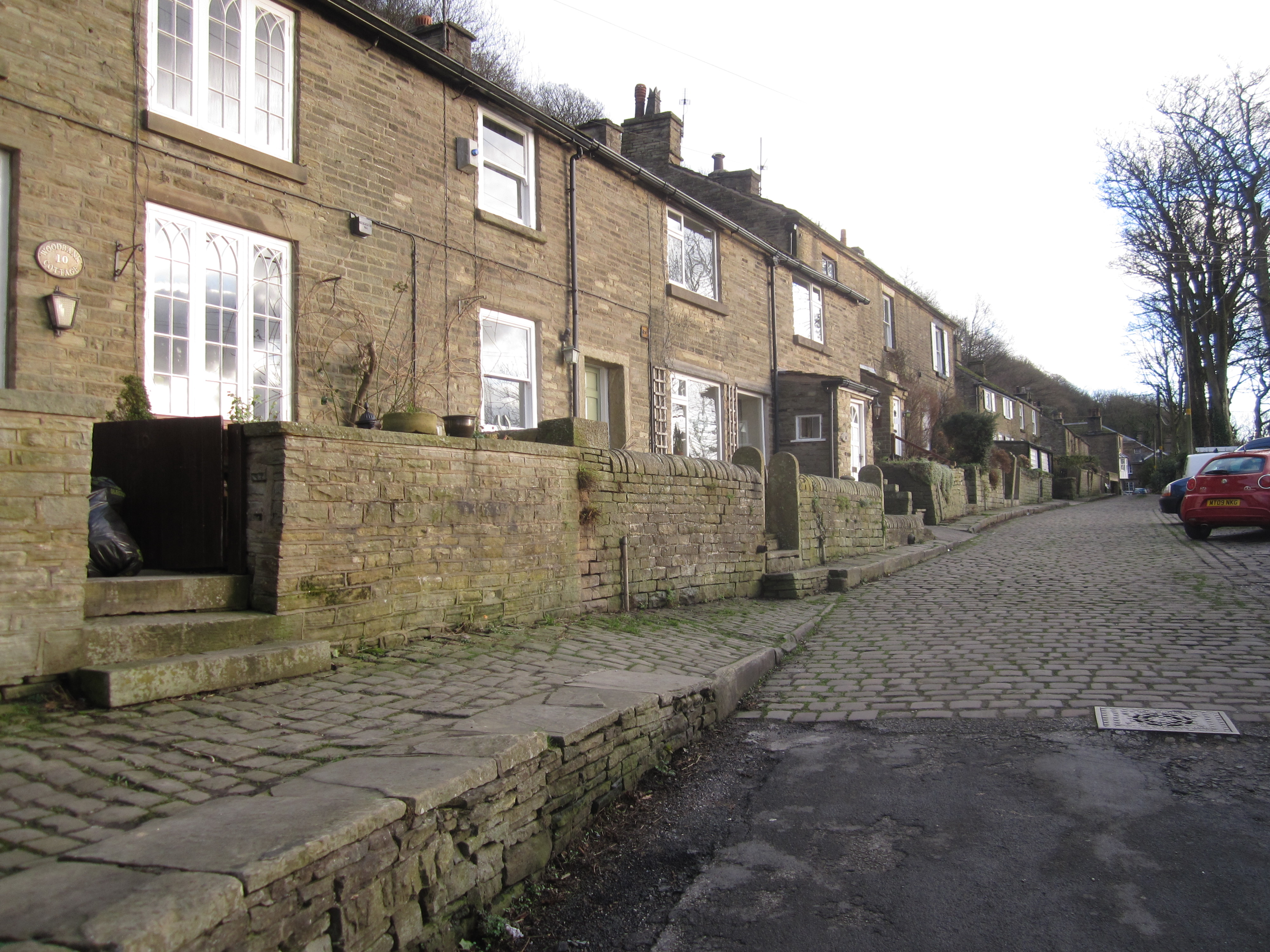
- Cottages on Higher Lane, Kerridge in 2020

- Location within Cheshire
- Civil parish: Bollington
- Unitary authority: Cheshire East
- Ceremonial county: Cheshire
- Region: North West
- Country: England
- Sovereign state: United Kingdom

Kerridge is a village in the civil parish of Bollington, in the Cheshire East district, in the ceremonial county of Cheshire, England. Kerridge borders the neighbouring village and civil parish of Rainow.

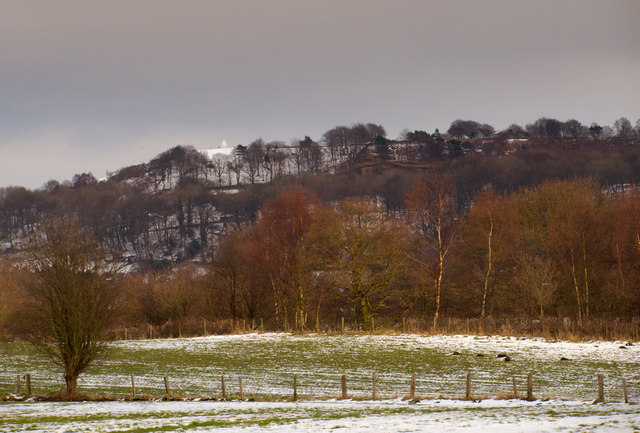
Kerridge Ridge and White Nancy in 2009

It gives its name to Kerridge Ridge – one of the western foothills of the Pennines – by which it stands. It is overlooked by the local landmark of White Nancy. The local industries were quarrying and cotton mills, of which remnants remain.

On 29 February 1912, the Macclesfield Canal at Kerridge burst its banks, flooding several nearby streets.

The area served by one pub, Bulls Head, which is owned by Robinsons Brewery.

== History ==
Kerridge itself comes from 'key ridge', and was known in Old English as 'Gaeg Hrycg'.

Kerridge became a civil parish in 1894, being formed from the rural part of Bollington, On 30 September 1900 the parish was abolished and merged with Bollington.
