= St Oswald's Church, Bollington =

Coordinates: 53.2920°N 2.1190°W

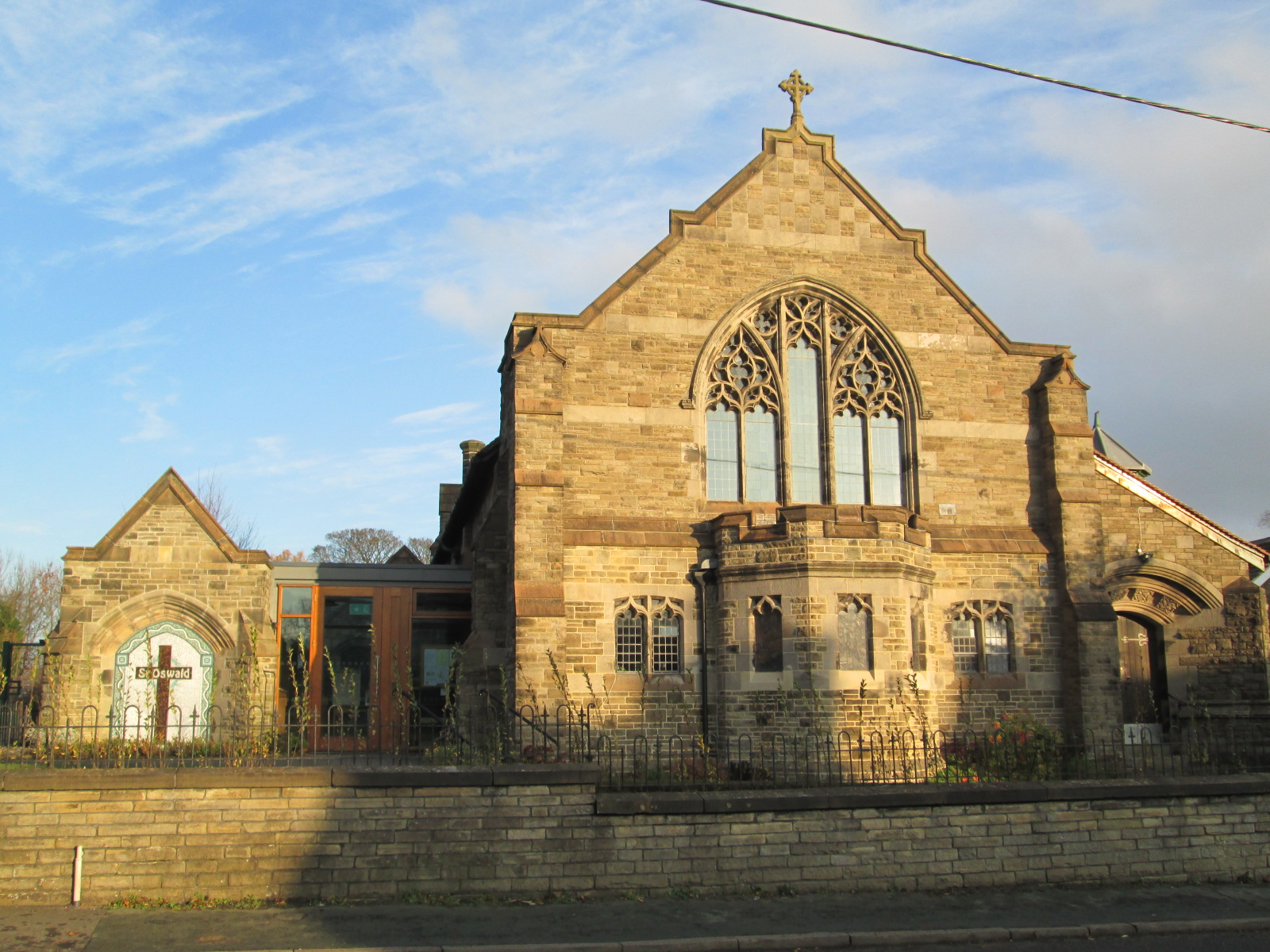

- Location in Cheshire
- OS grid reference: SJ 922 772
- Location: Bollington Cross, Bollington, Cheshire
- Country: England
- Denomination: Anglican Modern Catholic

History
- Status: Parish church
- Dedication: Saint Oswald
- Consecrated: 22 October 1908

Architecture
- Functional status: Active
- Heritage designation: Grade II
- Designated: 9 December 1983
- Architect: F. P. Oakley
- Architectural type: Church
- Style: Gothic Revival
- Groundbreaking: 1907
- Completed: 1908

Specifications
- Materials: Sandstone, tiled roofs

Administration
- Province: York
- Diocese: Chester
- Archdeaconry: Macclesfield
- Deanery: Macclesfield
- Parish: Bollington

Clergy
- Vicar: Revd Nancy Goodrich

St Oswald's Church is in Bollington Cross, Bollington, Cheshire, England. It is an active Anglican parish church in the deanery of Macclesfield, the archdeaconry of Macclesfield, and the diocese of Chester. The church is recorded in the National Heritage List for England as a designated Grade II listed building.

== History ==
St Oswald's was built in 1907–08 to a design by F. P. Oakley, and consecrated on 22 October 1908. In the 2000s two local Anglican churches closed, the Church of St John the Baptist in 2003, and the mission church of Holy Trinity in 2010. Consequently, St Oswald's has become the parish church of Bollington.

== Architecture ==
The church is constructed in buff sandstone. It has a red tiled roof, stone copings, and there is a stone chimney rising from the vestry. Its architectural style is florid Decorated. The church is orientated north–south, and consists of a four-bay nave with a single-bay chancel in one range, an east aisle, and porches on the west side and at the southeast corner. The bays on the west wall of the nave are separated by buttresses, each bay containing a three-light window with reticulated tracery. At the south end is a castellated bow window for the baptistry, above which is a three light window. The aisle has three-light windows with trefoil heads in rectangular surrounds.

The interior of the church is lined in brick with stone bands. The four-bay arcade is carried on piers with a diamond cross-section. The nave has a hammerbeam roof, and the chancel a wagon roof. In the chancel is a turquoise mosaic floor. The glass in the windows is clear, other than a stained glass window by Heaton, Butler and Bayne dated 1912, and one by W. J. Pearce dated 1916. The two-manual organ dates from 1908, and was moved here in 1965, and installed by Charles Smethurst.

== See also ==
- Listed buildings in Bollington
