= Angie Lewin =

British printmaker (born 1963)

Angie Lewin (born 1963) is a British printmaker working in linocut, wood engraving, lithography and screen printing.

== Biography ==
Lewin was born in Bollington, Cheshire in 1963. She studied Fine Art Printmaking at the Central School of Art and Design, London between 1983 and 1986. That was followed by a year's part-time postgraduate printmaking at Camberwell School of Arts and Crafts, and then garden design at Capel Manor College. After working in London as an illustrator, Lewin studied horticulture and moved to Norfolk to return to printmaking. She lives in North East Scotland with her husband, Simon Lewin.

== Work ==
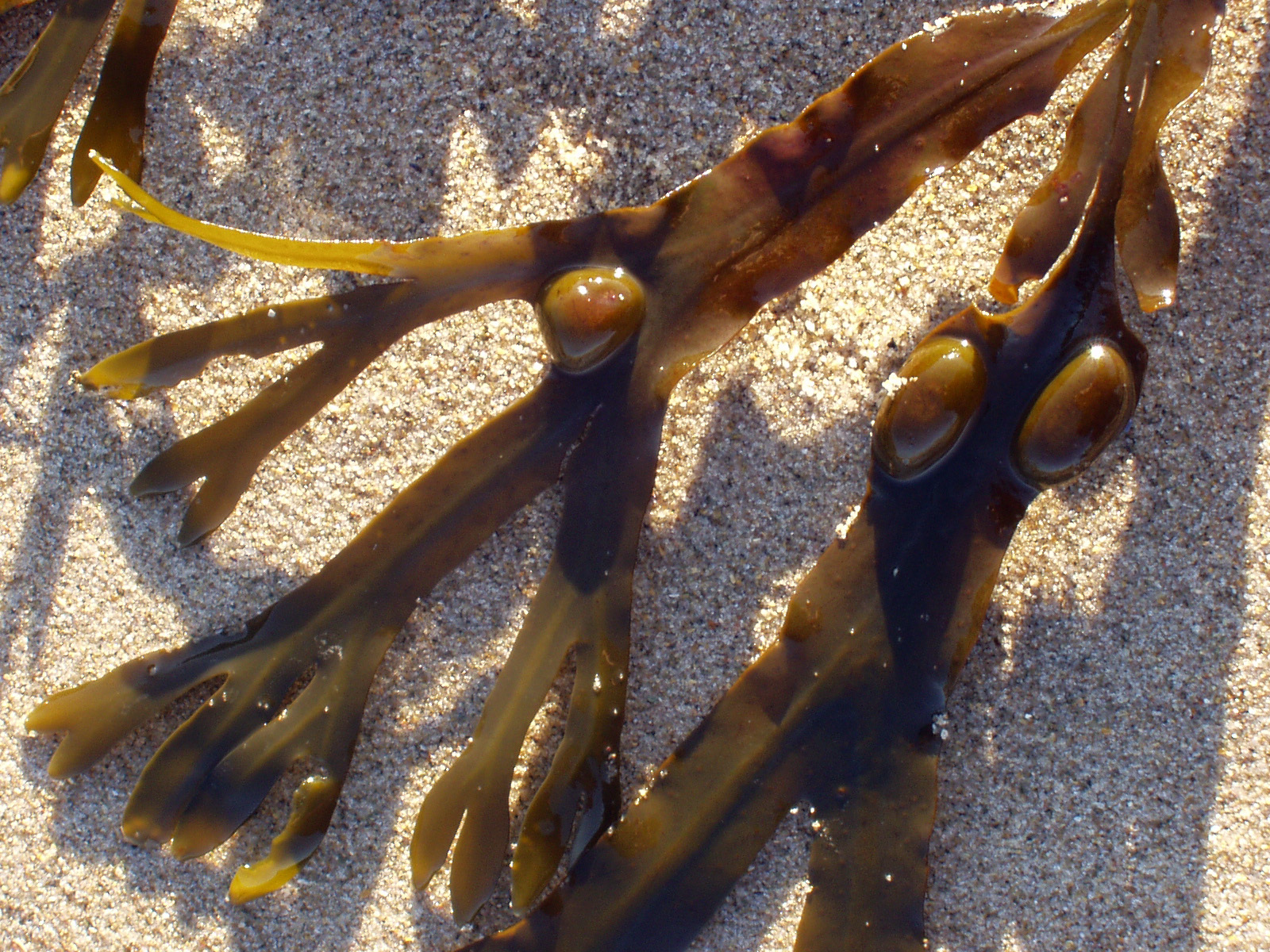
Lewin finds inspiration for her artwork in natural objects on the North Norfolk coast, like this bladder wrack.

Lewin is inspired by the hilltops and saltmarshes of the North Norfolk coast, and the Scottish Highlands. She depicts these contrasting environments and their native flora in wood engraving, linocut, silkscreen, lithography and collage. Lewin states that she has been influenced by the artist Edward Bawden.

As well as designing fabrics, wallpapers and stationery for the company she runs with her husband Simon, Lewin has completed commissions for Penguin, Conran Octopus and Picador. She has designed fabrics for Liberty's Autumn Winter 2010 collection, including the Winter Stem design used for Liberty's 2011 Comic Relief Shopper Bag.

Lewin has exhibited widely across Britain since 1986, including at the City Art Centre, Edinburgh, and at the Willis Museum and Sainsbury Gallery, Basingstoke.

== Honours and distinctions ==
Lewin was elected to the Royal Watercolour Society in 2016. She is a member of the Royal Society of Painter-Printmakers, The Society of Wood Engravers and The Art Workers' Guild.

== Bibliography ==
- Geddes-Brown, Leslie (2010). Angie Lewin: Plants and Places. Merrell. ISBN 978-1-85894-536-1. OCLC 587117547.
- Geddes-Brown, Leslie; Lewin, Angie (illustrator) (2009). Garden Wisdom. London: Merrell. ISBN 978-1-85894-462-3. OCLC 316043322.
