= Richard Cragg (cricketer) =

English cricketer

Personal information
- Full name: James Richard Allen Cragg
- Born: 28 October 1946 (age 80); Alderley Edge, Cheshire, England
- Batting: Right-handed
- Relatives: James Cragg (grandfather)

Domestic team information
- Years: Team
- 1970: Cambridge University
- 1966–1979: Cheshire

Career statistics
Competition	First-class
Matches	7
Runs scored	149
Batting average	11.46
100s/50s	0/1
Top score	55
Catches/stumpings	2/–
- Source: Cricinfo, 16 October 2018

James Richard Allen Cragg (born 28 October 1946) is a former English first-class cricketer.

Cragg was born at Alderley Edge in Cheshire in October 1946. He was educated nearby at King's School, Macclesfield. In 1966 he captained the MCC Schools team in its annual match against Combined Services at Lord's, and was named The Cricket Society's Young Cricketer of the Year.

Cragg's debut in minor counties cricket came for Cheshire in the 1966 Minor Counties Championship against Warwickshire Second XI at Macclesfield. Cragg later studied at Queens' College, Cambridge. He made his debut in first-class cricket for Cambridge University against Warwickshire at Fenner's in 1970. He played six more first-class matches for Cambridge University in 1970. His brief first-class span of seven matches saw him score 149 runs at an average of 11.46, with a highest score of 55. He continued to play minor counties cricket for Cheshire until 1979, making a total of 75 appearances in the Minor Counties Championship.

Cragg became an English teacher after graduating from Cambridge. Since the late 1950s, Cragg has maintained a close playing and voluntary administrative relationship with Bramhall Cricket Club. On 31 August 2019, Bramhall CC recognised this by naming their ground at Church Lane "The Richard Cragg Cricket Ground". His grandfather, James Cragg, was also a first-class cricketer and the president of Lancashire County Cricket Club.
