= White Nancy =

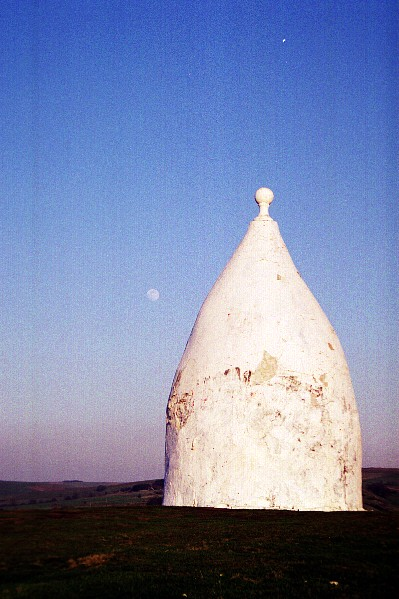
- White Nancy in 2005

- Location in Cheshire
- 53.29096°N 2.09235°W
- Location: Kerridge, Bollington, Cheshire, England
- OS grid reference: SJ 939 771

History
- Built: 1815
- Built for: Gaskell family

Site notes
- Elevation: 280.5 metres (920 ft)

Listed Building – Grade II
- Official name: White Nancy
- Designated: 17 March 1966
- Reference no.: 1138973

White Nancy is a structure at the top of Kerridge Hill, overlooking Bollington, Cheshire, England. Since 1966 it has been recorded in the National Heritage List for England (NHLE) as a designated Grade II listed building. Its profile forms the logo for the town of Bollington.

== History ==
White Nancy was built in 1817 by John Gaskell junior of North End Farm to commemorate the victory at the Battle of Waterloo. John Gaskell was a member of the Gaskell family who lived nearby at Ingersley Hall. It originally had an entrance to a single room which was furnished with stone benches and a central round stone table, but the entrance is now blocked. It has been described as a summer house or a folly. Locals supposedly told 1940s Army signallers working on Kerridge Hill that the landmark was named after the lead horse that had transported all materials for the building of White Nancy.

== Description ==
The structure is circular in plan with its shape described as that of a sugar loaf, and is surmounted with a ball finial. It is built in sandstone rubble which has been rendered and painted. It is about 18 feet (5 m) high. Stone paving has been laid around its base which is inscribed with the points of the compass.

== Painting and vandalism ==
Until at least 1925 the structure was unpainted. It has been painted in a number of different colours over the years, most commonly in white. In September 2005, vandals painted it partly in pink. In March 2009, it was repainted in white with the ball finial in black. In 2012 a Jubilee crown and the dates 1952–2012 were added to the north-west face and Olympic rings added to the south-east face. The green ring is in the form of a laurel wreath encircling a gold medal and the number 29 which was added later to mark Team GB's 29 gold medals. It has also been painted with a large red remembrance poppy and during the 1980s it was commonly painted at Christmas, decorated as a Christmas pudding or Father Christmas.

In 2015, in recognition of the reason for its construction, the structure was painted with a '200th Anniversary of the Battle of Waterloo' motif, and the silhouettes of soldiers in traditional military uniform from the time. In May 2016, it was returned to its traditional all white with a black finial.

In May 2017, by request of the mayor of Bollington, the worker bee symbol was painted onto the monument to express solidarity with the people of Manchester after the Manchester Arena bombing that month.

In March 2018, the face of Mark E. Smith of post-punk band the Fall was painted on White Nancy, together with the text "This Nation's Saving Grace". This was considered vandalism, and a Facebook group claimed responsibility.

During two separate incidents in May and June 2020, White Nancy was vandalised by conspiracy theorists, protesting against COVID-19 and 5G cellular network technology. The second incident was branded "racist" as it included a reference to the Ku Klux Klan (KKK).

In June 2024, White Nancy was wrapped in black plastic by local landfill closure protesters. In December 2024, it was vandalised again, the consequences lasting into 2025 despite cleanup efforts by volunteers at the time.

Bollington Town Council, which oversees the area, has claimed that a special kind of masonry paint is required every time that the White Nancy is vandalised.

== Visitor attraction ==
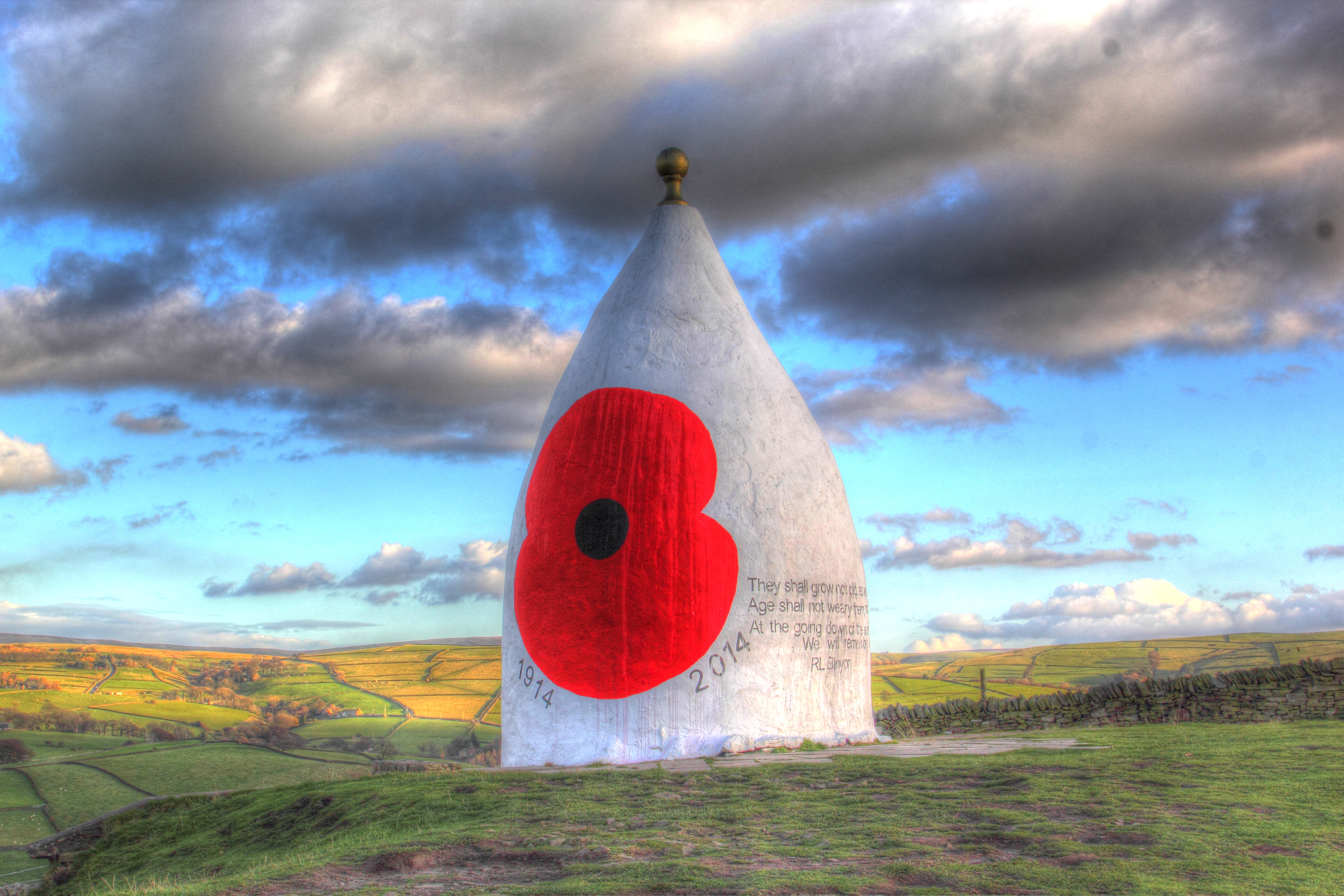
White Nancy painted with a remembrance poppy in 2014

White Nancy provides a focus on the ridge of Kerridge Hill and from it there are extensive views across the Cheshire Plain towards the mountains of North Wales to the west, the hills of Shropshire to the south and the Pennines to the north and east. White Nancy and the Kerridge Ridge are part of the 35-mile (56 km) Gritstone Trail, a long-distance footpath. The Peak District Boundary Walk also runs past the monument.

White Nancy has been acclaimed and has featured in countdowns of the best British follies identified by The Telegraph and by gardener, author and broadcaster Alan Titchmarsh.

== See also ==
- Listed buildings in Rainow
