= Tytherington School =

Location
- Manchester Road; Tytherington, Cheshire, SK10 2EE; England; 53°16′11″N 2°07′38″W

Information
- Type: Academy
- Motto: An ambitious school at the heart of the community
- Established: c. 1860s
- Local authority: Cheshire East (Independent)
- Department for Education URN: 140791 Tables
- Ofsted: Reports
- Chair of Governors: Edward Griffen
- Head: Emmanuel Botwe
- Gender: Coeducational, formerly all girls
- Age: 11 to 18
- Enrolment: 1,450
- Houses: Oak, Ash and Elm
- Colours: Maroon and Gold
- Website: tytheringtonschool.co.uk

Tytherington School is an academy in Macclesfield, Cheshire, England. The school has experienced a surge in popularity In the summer of 2016, under the new head, the school had record A-Level and GCSE results.

== History ==
The school traces its history back to an independent girls' school founded in the 1860s, but it was founded on its current site in the early 1950s, and became a mixed-sex school in the 1970s.

The school is split into year groups, (year 7 through to year 13), and houses. The houses are named Oak, Ash and Elm, in recognition of the traditional royal hunting woodlands in the Macclesfield area. The school also has a sixth form, Tytherington Sixth Form College.

Completely rebuilt in 1957, the school has been extended over the years including a £1 million Sports Hall sponsored by the National Lottery and multi-discipline technology block. The Learning Resource Centre (comprising library and ICT suite) and sixth form block have also been benefited from renovations. These improvements were part of a £3.1 million capital building programme that included a new 10 classroom block, called the Jubilee Block, that was completed in summer 2012, the project was paid for by Cheshire East Council. Before this, a new art block was built in 2006. Other renovations were also carried to existing blocks in the 2011–2012 academic year. Classroom renovations in the Learning Resource Centre were completed in April 2012, building a cafe for sixth form students, the new block opened at the start of the 2012–13 academic year.

During the 2014–15 academic year the school changed its name from Tytherington High School to Tytherington School to indicate the school's new status as an academy.
