= Gritstone Trail =

Long-distance footpath in England

Coordinates: 53.358°N 2.043°W

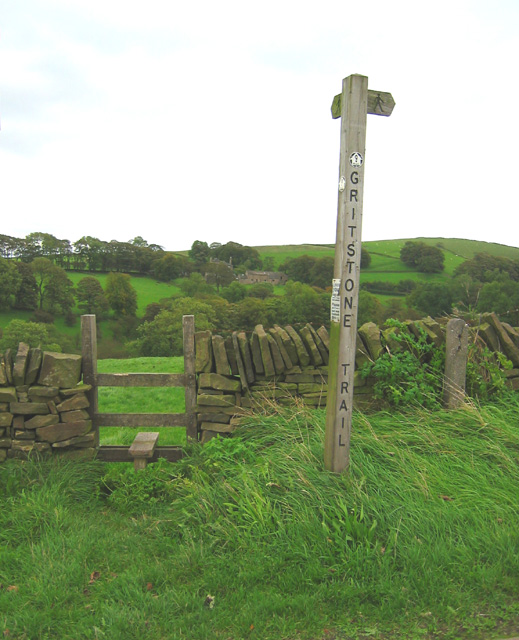
- Stile on the Gritstone Trail near Tegg's Nose
- Length: 35 mi (56 km)
- Location: Northern England
- Trailheads: Disley, Cheshire; Kidsgrove, Staffordshire
- Use: Hiking
- Highest point: Sponds Hill, 410 m (1,345 ft)
- Hazards: Stiles

The Gritstone Trail, or Cheshire Gritstone Trail, is a 35-mile (56 km) long-distance footpath in England which follows the most westerly hills of the Peak District from Disley Station to Mow Cop, and on via the Macclesfield Canal to Kidsgrove Station. Managed by Cheshire East (although partly in Staffordshire), the trail involves 5,900 feet (1,800 m) of ascent and is mainly outside the National Park. There are other routes in the Peak District referred to as a "Gritstone Trail" but they are less well established.

The trail connects the accessible and popular outdoor destinations of Lyme Park, White Nancy, Tegg's Nose and The Cloud, and the high sections of the trail are all notable for gritstone scenery and extensive views over the Cheshire Plain. Apart from the café at Tegg's Nose, there are no facilities on the route.

Most through hikers take three days (stopping at Macclesfield and Congleton) to complete the trail, traditionally (but for no particular reason) walked north to south, though the trail is more often used for shorter walks. The record in the annual Gritstone Grind (run south to north) is just under 5 hours.

Footpaths in Cheshire are marked with yellow discs indicating the direction of continuation, with Gritstone Trail Markers containing a footprint inscribed with a 'G'. There are also many wooden fingerposts with 'Gritstone Trail' engraved. An unofficial extension from Kidsgrove to the mainline railway station at Stoke-on-Trent, The Kidsgrove to Stoke Ridgeway, is available as a free ebook.

== See also ==
- List of recreational walks in Cheshire
