= Geology of Cheshire =

Geology of English county

The geology of Cheshire in England consists mainly of Triassic sandstones and mudstones. To the north west of Cheshire, these rocks are heavily faulted and the underlying Carboniferous Coal Measures are thrown up. Around the areas of Poynton and Macclesfield, the coal is close to the surface and was easily mined. Below the Coal Measures is the Millstone Grit, which appears towards the Derbyshire border on the flanks of the Peak District dome.

The Cheshire Basin is a major sedimentary basin which comprises the larger part of the county. This fault-bounded half-graben structure is bounded to the east and southeast by a series of faults of which the most significant is the Red Rock Fault. Numerous faults trend north–south through the basin, some of which help to define the series of hills which are known collectively as the Mid Cheshire Ridge. The basin was flooded on several occasions in the Permian and early Triassic periods resulting in the laying down of massive halite (salt) beds. These beds have been mined both by cavern working and hot water brine extraction for over 200 years, mainly in the area around Northwich. The collapse of some of these worked-out halite beds has given rise to some of Cheshire's noted features, the Cheshire Meres.

== Carboniferous ==
Rocks originating in the Carboniferous period are largely restricted to that part of the county to the east of the Red Rock Fault. They comprise mudstones, siltstones and sandstones of the Lower Coal Measures and of the Millstone Grit Group. A very small outcrop of Carboniferous Limestone formerly occurred near Astbury though this has largely been removed by quarrying.

Coal Measures strata also occurs in the Neston area though it is obscured by glacial till and estuarine alluvium. It represents the easternmost extent of the Flintshire Coalfield. An inlier of upper Carboniferous rocks occurs to the south of Chester though it too is obscured by superficial deposits.

Carboniferous strata underlies the entire Cheshire basin at depth.

== Permo–Triassic ==
The majority of the solid rocks of Cheshire are sedimentary rocks laid down during the Permian and Triassic periods. Both the east and west Cheshire Plains are immediately underlain by Triassic sandstones, siltstones and mudstones, although outcrops are restricted to those areas that are not covered by thick expanses of glacial till of glacio-fluvial sands and gravels, such as the Mid Cheshire Ridge and Alderley Edge.

Rocks of Permian age occur to the west of Chester and in restricted areas to the southeast and northeast of the city, although again largely obscured by superficial deposits.

== Jurassic ==
Small areas of the extreme south of the county are underlain by rocks of Jurassic age. Outcrops are very scarce as the thick cover of glacial till in this area largely obscures the underlying bedrock. The strata are assigned to the lowermost Jurassic Lias Group comprising mudstones and limestones.

== Quaternary ==
The larger part of the Cheshire Plain is covered by a thick mantle of glacial till and sands and gravels of glacio-fluvial origin. These deposits are the legacy of the over-riding of the area on several occasions by glacial ice during the past 2 million years. The present distribution of deposits and the landforms to which they give rise are largely the result of the last ice age, the Devensian which peaked around 22–20,000 years ago. Kettle holes caused by the in-situ melting of ice-blocks during deglaciation are a notable feature of the landscape. Many are now dry though others such as Hatchmere and Pettypool remain as locally significant waterbodies. These features constitute part of the inventory of the Cheshire meres though brine-related subsidence provides another mechanism for formation of some.

The morphology of both the Dee and Mersey estuaries is in large part owed to the passage of Irish Sea Ice southwestwards over the relatively soft sandstones of the area. These features have been termed iceways. There are also a number of tunnel valleys beneath modern river valleys and other parts of the plain, excavated by ice and meltwater. Striking examples underlie the lower and middle stretches of the Weaver valley and those of the Dee and Gowy near Chester.

A considerable number of small glacial meltwater channels have been identified along the Mid Cheshire Ridge such as that known as Urchin's Kitchen near Kelsall whilst larger examples occur along the edges of the Peak District. There are notable examples at Lyme Park and southwards to Bollington and again in the Bosley area, south of Macclesfield.

The floodplains of the majority of watercourses in the county are composed of alluvium which has accumulated in the post-glacial period. River terraces can be identified along some valleys such as those of the River Mersey and River Dane, reflecting changing base levels to which these rivers have been cutting down.

Peat deposits have accumulated in various of the kettle-holes, not least within Delamere Forest, and on parts of the high ground of the east of the county where thin soils and high rainfall have contributed to their formation.

== See also ==
- Geology of the United Kingdom
- Geology of Alderley Edge
