= Vernon Building Society (Poynton) Brass Band =

The Vernon Building Society (Poynton) Brass Band is a brass band from Poynton in Cheshire, England. As one of the North–West's premiere brass bands, Vernon Building Society (Poynton) Band is well known for its original and entertaining concert programmes, as well as being a prize–winner at contests throughout the country.

== History ==
Started within the Poynton coal mining community, the Vernon Building Society (Poynton) Band, as it is now known, was supported by the mine owners, the Vernon family. It is not known for certain when the band began, but records from 1832 stating that new uniforms had been purchased by Lady Vernon suggest that it has existed for well over 160 years.

Since 1988 the band has been proudly bearing the name of its sponsors the Vernon Building Society safeguarding the bands continued existence.

== Contesting honours ==
2020
North West Regional Championships (Championship Section) – TBC

2019
Dr Martin's Wainstones Cup – 2nd place overall and Best March
Spring Festival Senior Trophy – 1st Place
North West Regional Championships (Championship Section) – 10th Place

2018
Rochdale Contest (Championship/First) – 2nd Place
Spring Festival Senior Trophy – 5th Place
North West Regional Championships (Championship Section) – 4th Place

2017
North West Regional Championships (Championship Section) – 8th Place

2016
National Championship Of Great Britain (1st Section) – 2nd Place
Spring Festival Senior Cup – 12th Place
North West Regional Championships (1st Section) – 1st Place

2015
Rochdale Contest (Championship) – 3rd Place
Spring Festival Senior Trophy – 3rd Place
North West Regional Championships (Championship) – 13th Place

2014
Wychavon Entertainment Contest (Championship) – 2nd Place
Wychavon Entertainment Contest (1st Section) – 1st Place
Whit Friday – 3rd Prize (Upper Mossley)
North West Regional Championships (1st Section) – 4th Place
Butlins Mineworkers Open Brass Band Festival (1st Section) – 2nd Place

2013
Northern Open Brass Band Championships (Championship) – 2nd Place
Fleetwood Open Brass Band Championships (Championship) – 3rd Place
Whit Friday – 7th Overall in Tameside
Whit Friday – 1st Prize (Duckinfield)
Buxton Brass Band Festival (Championship Section) – 2nd Place
North West Regional Championships (1st Section) – 5th Place
Butlins Mineworkers Open Brass Band Festival (1st Section) – 17th Place

2012
Buxton Brass Band Festival (Championship/1st) – 3rd Prize
North West Regional Championships (Championship Section) – 10th Place

2011
Wychavon Festival of Brass (Championship Section) – 5th Place
Bolsover Brass Festival (Championship Section) – 7th Place
North West Regional Championships (Championship Section) – 9th Place

2010
Whit Friday – 12th Overall in Saddleworth
North West Regional Championships (1st Section) – 4th Place
Butlins Mineworkers Championships (1st Section) – 3rd Prize

2009
Bolsover Brass Festival (1st Section) – 1st Prize
Wychavon Festival of Brass (1st Section) – 1st Prize
Buxton Brass Band Festival (Championship/1st) – 2nd Prize
North West Regional Championships (1st Section) – 7th Place
Butlins Mineworkers Championships (1st Section) – 3rd Prize

== Musical director ==
Musical Director – Stig Maersk

Associate Conductor – Jess Tredrea

== Composer in residence ==
Darrol Barry

== Current principal players ==
- Principal Cornet: TBC
- Solo Euphonium: Sam Noden
- Soprano Cornet: Emily Williams
- Solo Trombone: Toby Marshall
- Solo Horn: Jilly Atwell
- Flugel Horn: Jess Tredrea
- Solo Baritone: Natsumi McDonald
- Principal Eb Bass: Tom Barnet
- Principal Percussion: David Johnson

== Discography ==
Album	Conductor
The Anson	Grenville Moore
Musical Reflections	Alan Lawton MBE
Individually Yours	Alan Lawton MBE
