= James Meunier =

English cricketer and footballer

Personal information
- Full name: James Brown Meunier
- Date of birth: 7 April 1885
- Place of birth: Poynton, England
- Date of death: 30 September 1957 (aged 72)
- Place of death: Loughborough, England
- Height: 5 ft 8 1/2 in (1.74 m)
- Position: Full back

Senior career*
Years	Team	Apps	(Gls)
–1903	Heaton Chapel		
1903–1904	Stockport County	0	(0)
1904–1906	Manchester City	0	(0)
1906–1908	Southport Central	31	(9)
1908–1912	Everton	5	(0)
1912–1914	Lincoln City	23	(0)
1914–1915	Coventry City	10	(0)
- Hyde United
1920	Macclesfield	1	(0)
- * Club domestic league appearances and goals

James Brown Meunier (1885 – 30 September 1957) was an English cricketer and footballer who played first-class cricket in two matches for Warwickshire in 1920 and association football for several clubs in the Football League.

== Sporting career ==
Meunier played football for a number of Football League and non-League clubs in the period before the First World War and appeared in Minor Counties cricket for Lincolnshire in 1914. After the war, he played twice for Warwickshire as a right-handed lower-order batsman and right-arm fast bowler, but he was given little opportunity to bowl in either match and his batting was not successful. He later played for Plymouth Cricket Club.

== Personal life ==
Meunier served as a corporal in the Royal Garrison Artillery during the First World War.

== Football career statistics ==
Appearances and goals by club, season and competition
Club	Season	League			FA Cup		Other		Total	
Club	Season	Division	Apps	Goals	Apps	Goals	Apps	Goals	Apps	Goals
Southport Central	1906–07	Lancashire Combination First Division	4	1	0	0	1 (Note: Appearance in Lancashire Senior Cup)	0	5	1
Southport Central	1907–08	Lancashire Combination First Division	27	8	3	0	1	1	31	9
Southport Central	Total		31	9	3	0	2	0	36	10
Everton	1910–11	First Division	4	0	0	0	―		4	0
Everton	1911–12	First Division	1	0	0	0	―		1	0
Everton	Total		5	0	0	0	―		5	0
Coventry City	1914–15	Southern League Second Division	10	0	1	0	―		11	0
Macclesfield	1919–20	Cheshire League	1	0	―		1 (Note: Appearance in Cheshire League Subsidiary Competition)	0	2	0
Career total			47	9	4	0	3	1	54	10
