= Poynton =

Town in Cheshire, England

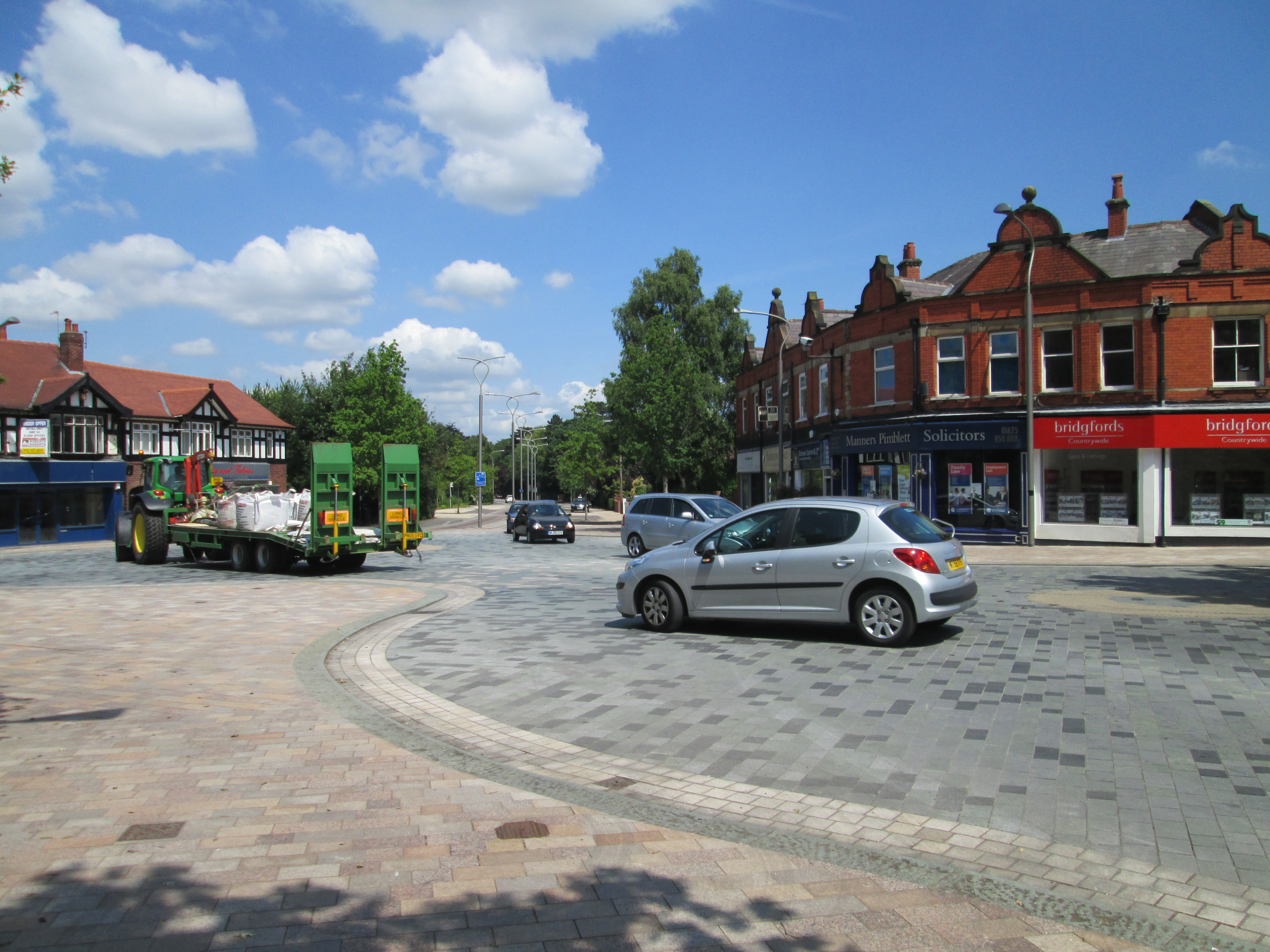
- Poynton shared space town centre, remodelled in 2011

- Location within Cheshire
- Area: 13.1 km^{2} (5.1 sq mi)
- Population: 14,260 (2011 census)
  - Density: 1,089/km^{2} (2,820/sq mi)
- OS grid reference: SJ925835
  - London: 152 mi (245 km)
- Civil parish: Poynton with Worth
- Unitary authority: Cheshire East
- Ceremonial county: Cheshire
- Region: North West
- Country: England
- Sovereign state: United Kingdom
- Post town: STOCKPORT
- Postcode district: SK12
- Dialling code: 01625
- Police: Cheshire
- Fire: Cheshire
- Ambulance: North West
- UK Parliament: Macclesfield

Poynton is a town in the civil parish of Poynton-with-Worth, in the Cheshire East district and the ceremonial county of Cheshire, England; from 1974 to 2009 it was in Macclesfield district. It is located on the easternmost fringe of the Cheshire Plain, 11 miles (18 km) south-east of Manchester, 7 miles (11 km) north of Macclesfield and 5 miles (8 km) south of Stockport.

The first mention of the manor of Poynton was in 1289. Coal was mined in Poynton from the 16th century and the collieries, under the ownership of the Lords Vernon from 1832 until their closure in 1935, were the largest in Cheshire. Consequent urbanisation and socioeconomic development necessitated better transport links; these came with the completion of the Macclesfield Canal through Poynton in 1831, the arrival of the Manchester and Birmingham Railway in 1845 and the Macclesfield, Bollington and Marple Railway in 1869. In the late 20th century, Poynton became a commuter town for Manchester. Since 1945, the population has nearly trebled to 14,260 in 2011.

== History ==
The name Poynton derives from the Old English pofaingtūn meaning 'settlement connected with Pofa'.

The settlement does not appear in the Domesday Book of 1086. The first mention of the manor of Poynton occurred in the 13th century when it was held under the Earl of Chester by the Poutrells family and then by the de Stockeports, lords of Stockport. It was part of the barony of Stockport. Past spellings include Ponynton and Poynington. The Warren family held the manor from 1382, beginning with Sir John de Warren, who was a son of Sir Edward de Warren and his wife Cicely de Eton of Poynton and Stockport. This family held the manor until 1801, when Sir George Warren, the last surviving male, died. He was succeeded by his daughter, Lady Warren Bulkeley. She died childless in 1826 when she left the estate to Frances Maria Warren (then Lady Vernon) daughter of Sir John Borlase Warren, 1st Baronet. The Lords Vernon held the estate until the final sale in 1920.

Coal was found outcropping to the east of Towers Road, which corresponds to the line of the Red Rock Fault at the surface. The earliest record to be found is a lease dated 28 February 1589, which talks of the "Coal pit at Wourthe lately occupied by George Finche". This could be worked on the surface then by shallow shafts, and later by deeper shafts with waterwheels or steam engines operating pumps and winding gear. In the late 18th century, the Warrens of Poynton co-operated with the Leghs of Lyme to work the Cannel and Sheepwash seams at Norbury Hollow. Initially, the mines were pumped using waterwheels driven by the Norbury Brook; atmospheric steam engines were then used and then condensing engines thus allowing deeper pits to be sunk. Output in 1789 was over 23,586 tonnes (26,000 tons), rising to a production of 221,056 tonnes (243,673 tons) in 1859, an amount believed unlikely to have been surpassed. The Poynton Collieries were substantial, and the coal rights were held by the Warren family who leased them the Wrights and the Claytons. The canal, and new roads and railway lines, were used to remove the coal. (Note: In Cheshire and Lancashire, mine was a word meaning seam, a pit was a shaft and a collection of shafts was a colliery.) In 1826, the estate passed to George John Venables Vernon, 4th Lord Vernon, who decided in 1832 to manage the mines himself. In 1856 it was estimated that there was a reserve of 15,163,027 tons, which would supply 245,000 tons for 61 years. This was to be supplied by the Park Round Pit and the Park Oval Pit, both working the Four Foot and Five Foot Seam, and the Anson Pit and the Nelson Pit, which were working the Accommodation Seam. The pits had good transport links to their principal markets, cotton mills around Manchester. With the Lancashire Cotton Famine in 1861, and the subsequent recession, the price of coal collapsed, and the output dropped 112,840 tons, leading to worker redundancies. A new shaft, the Lawrance Pit, was sunk at Park in 1885, raising the output to 216,362 tons and paying for itself within a year. However the costs were rising and the closure of the Norbury Pits resulted in a constant ingress of water. In 1926 production was down to 80,146 tons. The 1926 General strike lasted for 17 weeks in Poynton and the men went back to work as the collieries would have closed because of the cost of pumping. The collieries closed on 30 August 1935; 250 men were made redundant. Eighty were offered jobs in the Kent coalfield and some secured employment with Avro at Woodford. The Anson Colliery is now the site of the Anson Engine Museum; all other shafts have been capped and Park Pit has been levelled.

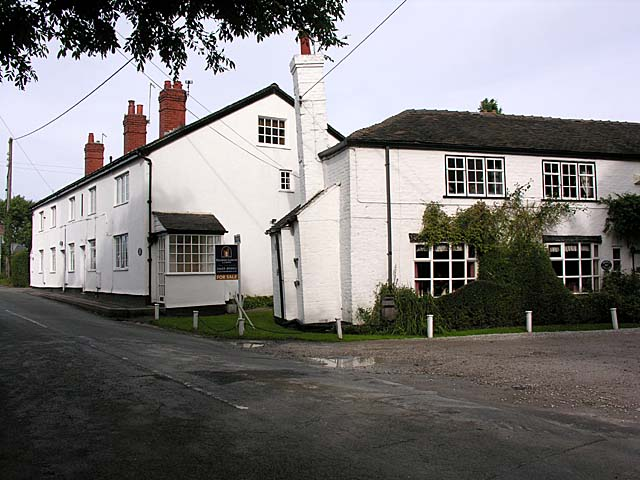
Cottages originally built for miners at the bottom of the Coppice in Poynton

The Macclesfield Canal was originally proposed in 1765 but construction did not start until 1826 because of opposition from outside parties. The canal was designed by Thomas Telford and completed in 1831. Sir George Warren was a promoter of the extension of the turnpike road from Manchester by way of Hazel Grove to Sandon, Staffordshire, where it joined what is now the A51 road. The Manchester and Birmingham Railway opened a line through Poynton in 1845, which now forms part of the London–Manchester main line. The Macclesfield, Bollington and Marple Railway opened in 1869 with stations at Higher Poynton and Middlewood; it closed in 1970, and the line is now a footpath called the Middlewood Way.

In the late 18th century, the Pickford family developed their family business of waggoners on the London-to-Manchester route with The Birches Farm at Poynton as its headquarters. The business thrived and they relocated to London in 1823. Pickfords is today one of the best-known removal firms in the United Kingdom.

From the 1870s, private house-building gathered pace and gradually Poynton became a commuter town for workers in the Manchester conurbation. Since the Second World War, several housing estates have been built by both the local authorities and private developers.

The population has risen from 5,000 to almost 15,000 since 1945.

== Governance ==
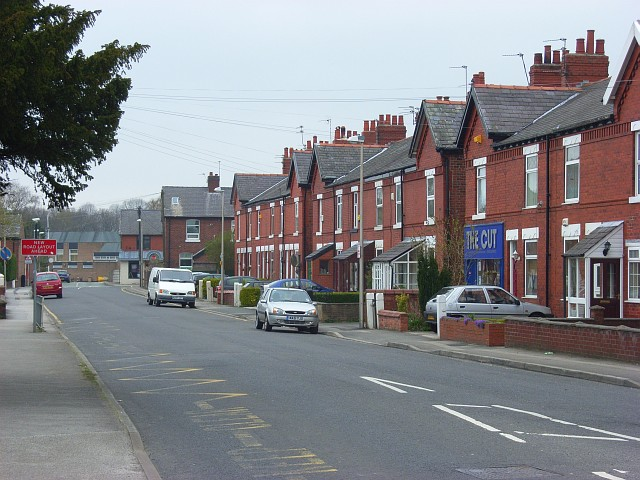
Terraced housing on Bulkeley Road, Poynton

From 1974 until the 2009 structural changes to local government in England, Poynton was administered by three tiers of local government: the parish council of Poynton-with-Worth, Macclesfield Borough Council and Cheshire County Council. Poynton-with-Worth (a civil parish) was made up of three electoral wards and was created in 1880 by uniting the hitherto separate civil parishes of Poynton and Worth. In 2009 the Parish Council resolved to become a Town Council and elect a Mayor, creating Poynton with Worth Town Council.

Cheshire East Council took over the responsibilities of the borough council and the county council on 1 April 2009.

Poynton is represented on Cheshire East Council in two two-member electoral wards, Poynton West and Pott Shrigley and Poynton East and Adlington, by four councillors, all members of the Conservative Party. Poynton is in the Macclesfield Constituency of the United Kingdom Parliament, which was represented by Conservative MPs from 1918 to 2024 but is currently represented by Labour Party MP Tim Roca.

Poynton was formerly a township and chapelry in the parish of Prestbury, in 1866 Poynton became a separate civil parish, in 1880 the parish was abolished.

== Geography ==
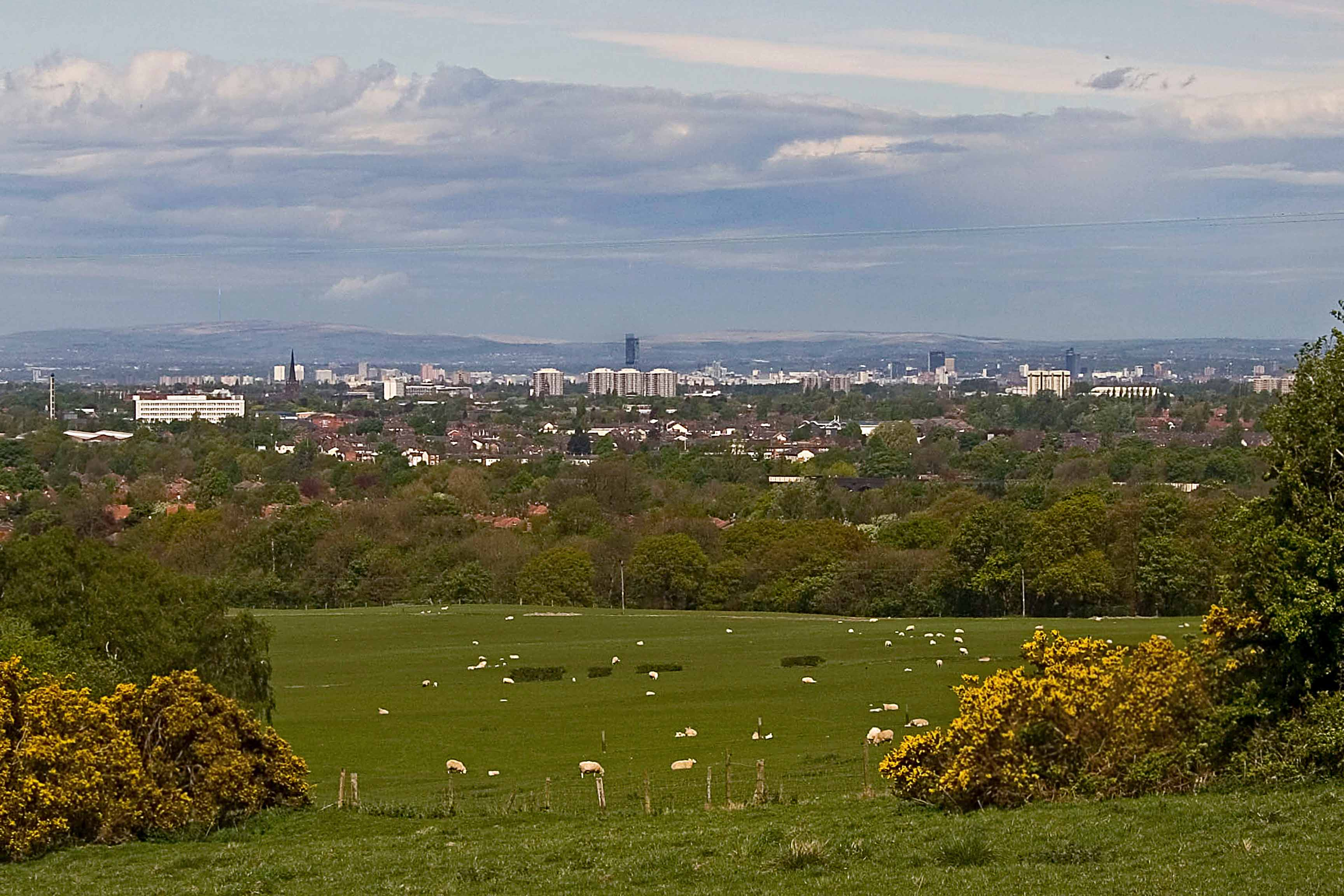
Manchester city centre, 11 miles (18 km) from Poynton

Poynton is located at SJ925835 53°20′53″N 2°06′50″W, between the Norbury Brook and the Poynton Brook at the easternmost limit of the Cheshire Plain. The land is between 88 metres (289 ft) and 190 metres (620 ft) above sea level. The town is approximately 17 kilometres (11 mi) SSE of Manchester, 8 kilometres (5.0 mi) from Manchester Airport, 15 kilometres (9.3 mi) from junction 5 of the M56 motorway and 10 kilometres (6.2 mi) from junction 3 of the M60 motorway. The west of the parish is predominantly residential, buffered from Hazel Grove and Bramhall by the North Cheshire Green Belt. To the south of the town are two business parks but here and to the east it is rural in nature, bounding on the former deer park of Lyme Hall. The A6 trunk road passes to the north of the parish, and the Macclesfield Canal runs north–south along the 155 metres (509 ft) contour to the east of the parish.

The town straddles the Red Rock Fault. Its 200-metre (660 ft) downthrow to the west brings the Permo–Triassic sandstones and mudstones of the Cheshire Plain up against the Millstone Grit and shales of the Peak District. To the immediate east of the fault are the coal measures of the Carboniferous period which, unlike those in the Lancashire Coalfield, are missing the top layers. Outcrops of the Middle Coal Measures are present here. Coal from these strata, particularly the Four Foot Mine (or seam), the Five Foot Mine and the Accommodation Mine, was mined in the 19th and early 20th centuries. The lower ground, including most of Poynton, is covered by glacial till left by the retreating ice sheet at the close of the last ice age.

Woodford Aerodrome was to the west and was owned by BAE Systems and had a Met Office weather station. Woodford's weather station recorded a temperature of −17.6 °C (0.3 °F) on 8 January 2010, during the Winter of 2009–10 in Great Britain and Ireland. The area has now been developed for housing.

=== Climate ===
Climate data for Woodford (88 m elevation) 1981–2010
Month	Jan	Feb	Mar	Apr	May	Jun	Jul	Aug	Sep	Oct	Nov	Dec	Year
Mean daily maximum °C (°F)	6.9 (44.4)	7.2 (45.0)	9.7 (49.5)	12.3 (54.1)	15.9 (60.6)	18.4 (65.1)	20.2 (68.4)	20.1 (68.2)	17.4 (63.3)	13.5 (56.3)	9.6 (49.3)	7.1 (44.8)	13.2 (55.8)
Mean daily minimum °C (°F)	0.8 (33.4)	1.0 (33.8)	2.4 (36.3)	3.6 (38.5)	6.7 (44.1)	9.0 (48.2)	11.7 (53.1)	11.3 (52.3)	9.2 (48.6)	6.7 (44.1)	3.0 (37.4)	0.6 (33.1)	5.5 (41.9)
Average rainfall mm (inches)	81.5 (3.21)	51.5 (2.03)	58.6 (2.31)	61.4 (2.42)	54.8 (2.16)	64.5 (2.54)	67.3 (2.65)	79.4 (3.13)	79.6 (3.13)	98.8 (3.89)	79.9 (3.15)	89.8 (3.54)	867.1 (34.14)
Average rainy days (≥ 1.0 mm)	15.8	11.0	12.8	11.8	10.9	9.7	11.7	12.8	12.1	14.4	14.4	14.4	151.7
Mean monthly sunshine hours	43.8	69.8	97.7	137.1	185.9	163.7	171.7	161.6	133.3	89.7	63.7	54.6	1,372.6
Source: Met Office

== Demography ==
At the time of the 2011 census, the population of the parish of Poynton with Worth was 14,260. The ethnic grouping of Poynton was 98% white, 1.1% Asian, 0.5% Mixed Race, 0.1% Black/African/Caribbean and 0.2% other groups. Religious division was 70.4% Christian, 21.5% no religion, 0.3% Muslim and 0.2% other religions. 59.7% of residents aged over 16 were married.

== Culture and community ==
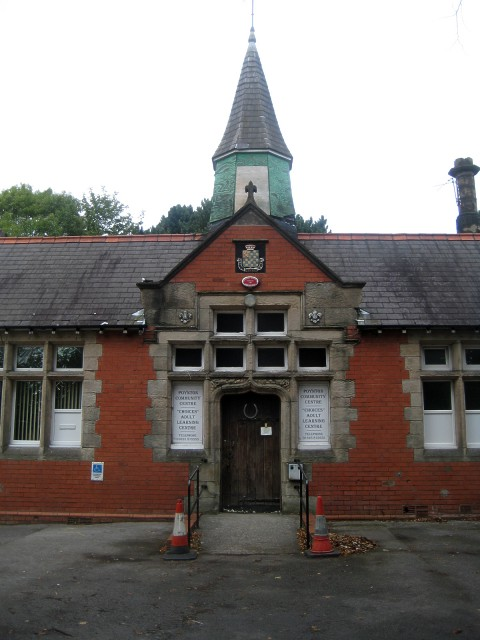
Poynton Community Centre

Poynton Co-op was founded in 1862, staying independent until February 1992. There were many Friendly Societies, Burial Clubs, Workmen's Club and the Miners' Union. The Methodist Chapel was established in 1847 followed by the Baptists and Primitive Methodists chapels; together with St George's Church they were the social centres of the village. Lord Vernon opened the first school in 1838 which was extended as the number of children attending it grew, and this building is now used as the Poynton Youth and Community Centre.

The Poynton Show is held every August bank holiday weekend. It started in 1885, as an agricultural show, and has grown in size; 35,000 people visited the show in 1970. It offers a range of events in the main arena such as stunt riding and aerobatics, a fairground, exhibitions and competitive events.

The St George's Singers is large choral society founded in 1956. The choir has strong links with the Royal Northern College of Music and Chetham's School of Music. It has sung in Helsinki, Tallinn, Kraków, Budapest and Érd; more locally the choir's annual Singing Day regularly attracts over 200 singers to learn and perform choral music. The Vernon Building Society (Poynton) Brass Band first started within the Poynton coal-mining community and was supported by the mine owners, the Vernon family. Records from 1832 stating that new uniforms had been purchased by Lady Vernon suggest that it has existed for over 160 years.

Poynton has two Anglican churches: St Martin's, Higher Poynton, and St George's, which occupies a prominent position in the town centre. St George's church dates from 1859 and is in the Victorian Gothic style; the steeple was added in 1884. The two churches have active congregations and run services, youth groups and a children's group.

Poynton is twinned with Érd in Hungary. Since 2016, it has also been twinned with Haybes in France.

== Landmarks ==
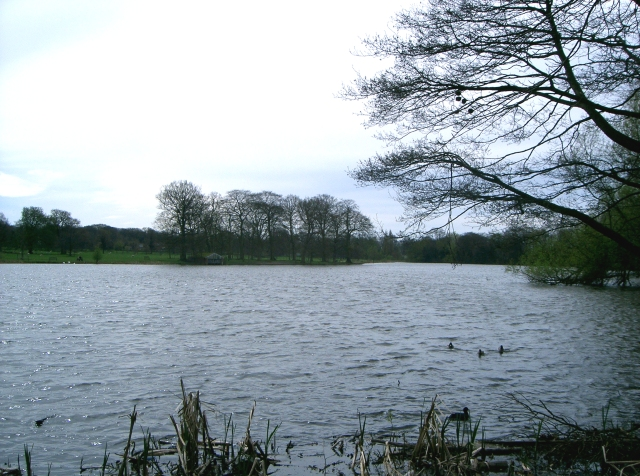
Poynton Pool

Sir George Warren bought the Worth estate in 1792. Worth Hall, now redeveloped as flats, was originally the home of the Downes family of Worth; it lies within Davenport Golf Club. Several halls were built in Poynton Park, each one then demolished to make way for a new hall. The final hall, Poynton Towers, was demolished in the 1930s. The ornamental lake, known locally as Poynton Pool, was created in the 1760s by Sir George Warren, who dammed a tributary of Poynton Brook as part of his landscaping of the park. The dam itself served as the foundation for the turnpike.

Poynton Coppice is a designated local nature reserve. Other landmarks include St George's Church, with the town's war memorial in its churchyard, Park Colliery and Anson Pit.

== Transport ==
=== Waterways ===
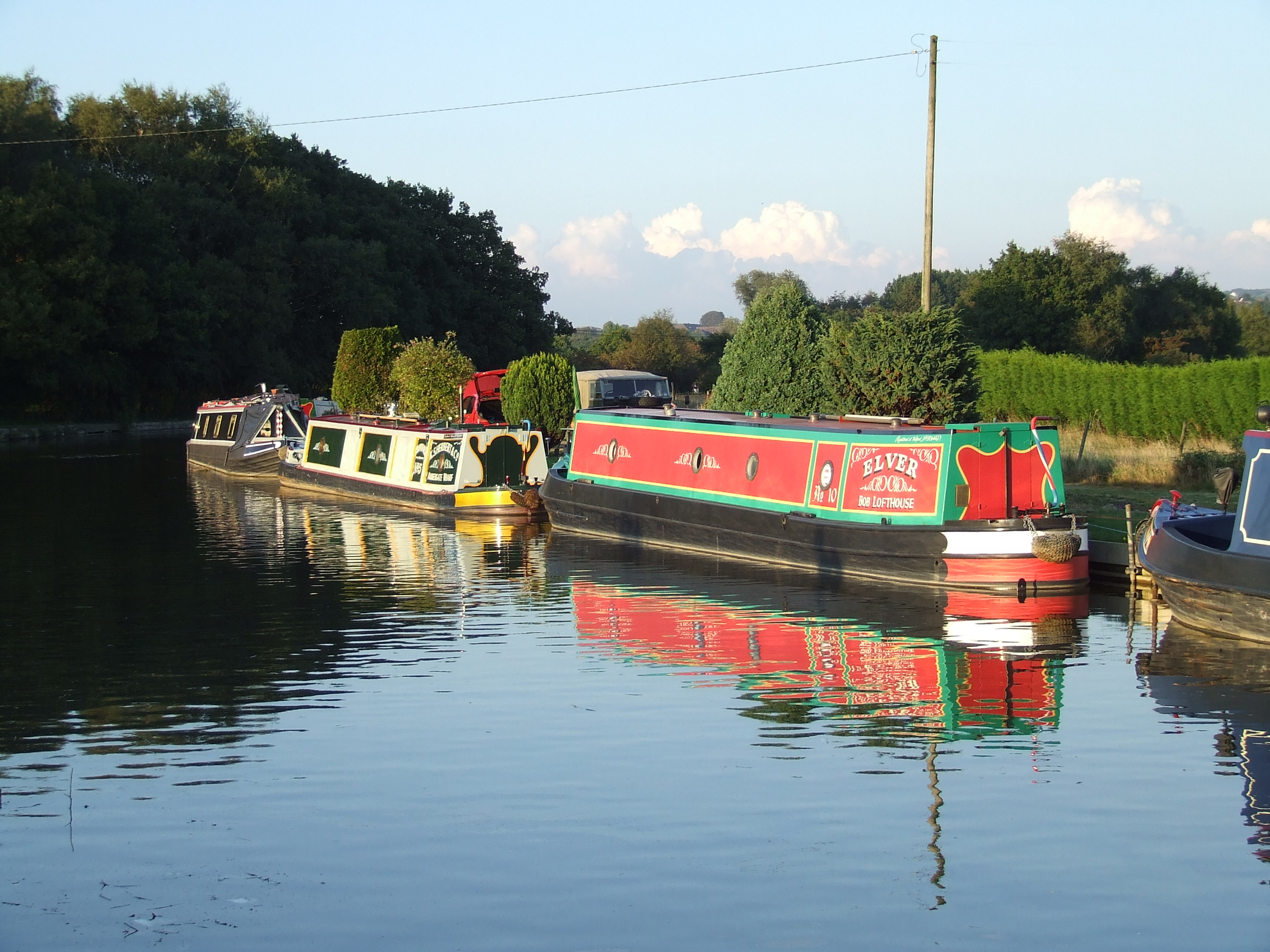
Narrowboats on the Macclesfield Canal in Higher Poynton

The Macclesfield Canal, a canal with only one flight of locks, was first proposed in 1765, but was not commenced until 1826. Completed in 1831, it joins the Peak Forest Canal in Marple with the Trent and Mersey Canal near Kidsgrove and forms a part of the Cheshire Ring. The route was chosen so it could pass close to the Poynton Colleries to transport coal to Macclesfield for the steam engines and c5,000 houses. It shortened the canal journey from Manchester to London by 25 miles (40 km) and allowed easy carriage of coal to the cotton mills at Dukinfield.

=== Railway ===
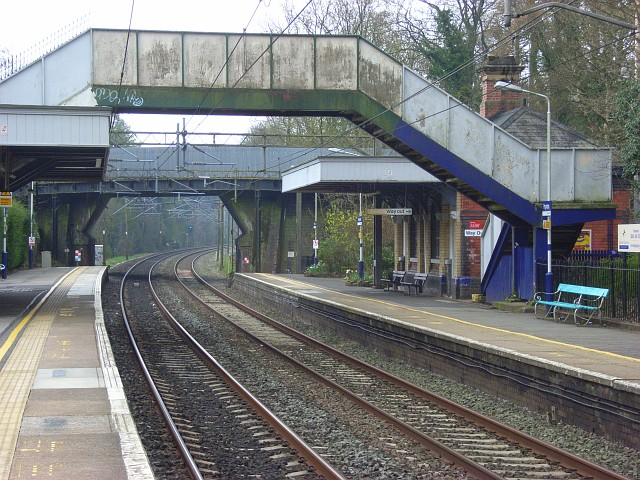
Poynton railway station in 2008

The Manchester & Birmingham Railway opened a line through Poynton in 1845, which now forms a spur of the West Coast Main Line between London Euston and Manchester Picadilly. Poynton railway station is served by northbound trains to Stockport and Manchester Piccadilly, and southbound to Macclesfield and Stoke-on-Trent. Services are operated by Northern Trains; they run generally hourly trains in both directions, with additional trains at peak times and fewer on Sundays.

The Macclesfield, Bollington and Marple Railway was opened in 1869, with stations at Higher Poynton and Middlewood. This line was closed in January 1970 and was later converted into a shared-use path called the Middlewood Way, which was opened in 1985 by David Bellamy.

=== Roads ===
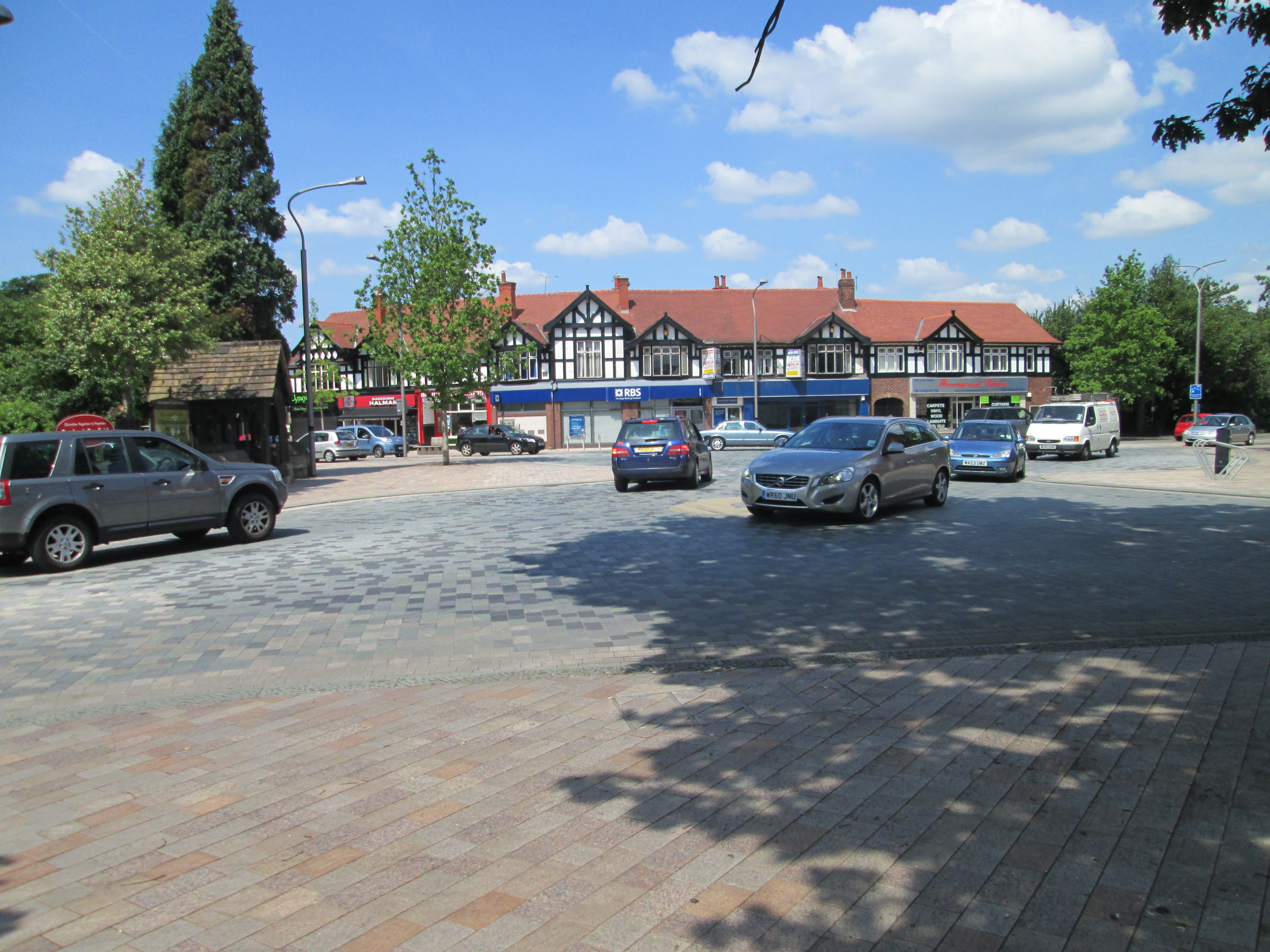
Shared space roundabout in the centre of Poynton, new in 2011

Poynton lies to the south of the A6 road. This was the favoured London to Manchester route in the Late Middle Ages, as it avoided the wetter land of the Cheshire Plain. This is shown in John Ogilby's road atlas of 1675. It was improved by the formation of a turnpike trust in 1724. In 1760, Sir George Warren, the Leghs of Adlington and James Pickford promoted a new turnpike through Poynton with Worth from Hazel Grove to Sandon in Staffordshire on the A51 road; this provided a link to Macclesfield. It is now known as the A523 or locally as the London Road. Later, the A5149 Chester Road, provided a link to Wilmslow. The town is within 5 miles of the M60 motorway at Stockport and M56 motorway at Manchester Airport.

==== Shared Space ====
In December 2011, the village road network was reconstructed at the junction of Chester Road/Park Lane and London Road, creating the first double roundel for a high-traffic intersection. Similar to a roundabout, the new junction reduces the four-lane approaches to two lanes, allowing pedestrians to cross quickly and safely allowing the elimination of traffic signals. Multiple coloured and textured cobbles separate traffic from pedestrian areas; however, it functions as a shared space, allowing pedestrians to cross anywhere that feels safe. According to the town, businesses have seen increased foot traffic and congestion has been considerably lessened. The total cost was £4m.

=== Buses ===
Cheshire East Council is responsible for co-ordinating public transport. It runs an Integrated Transport Service based in Crewe. Poynton with Worth parish council was one of the Cheshire parishes that were part of Selnec PTE, created by the Transport Act 1968, but was not included in Greater Manchester when it was formed on 1 April 1974 by the Local Government Act 1972. As a result, special ticketing arrangements are in place within the parish.

The 391/392 bus services, operated by Belle Vue Coaches, run between Stockport and Macclesfield every two hours in each direction on Mondays to Saturdays.

== Media ==
Local news and television programmes are provided by BBC North West and ITV Granada. Television signals are received from the Winter Hill TV transmitter.

The town is served by these local radio stations:

- BBC Radio Manchester
- Heart North West
- Smooth North West
- Greatest Hits Radio Manchester & The North West
- Canalside Radio, a community-based station broadcast from Macclesfield.

The Poynton Post and regional Manchester Evening News are the town's local newspapers.

== Education ==
Education in Poynton is now run by Cheshire East Council; it was formerly run by Cheshire County Council. Given the proximity to the border, some parents choose to have their children educated in Stockport.

There are 5 primary schools and Poynton High School. After secondary school, young residents can attend Poynton High School's sixth form or colleges nearby such as Aquinas College, Marple College or Macclesfield College.

== Notable people ==
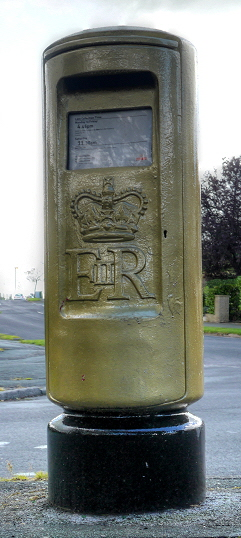
The post box outside Poynton High School was painted gold in honour of ex-pupil Sarah Storey winning four gold medals at the 2012 Summer Paralympics.

- Leslie Wood (1920–1994), artist and illustrator, lived in Poynton
- Joyce Scott (born 1938), an Australian oil painter and ceramicist, migrated to Adelaide, in 1951.
- Alan Beith (born 1943 in Poynton), Lib Dem MP for Berwick-upon-Tweed 1973–2015
- Stephen Oake (1963 in Poynton – 2003), a police officer who was murdered while attempting to arrest a suspected terrorist
- Graham Evans, Baron Evans of Rainow (born 1963 in Poynton), MP for Weaver Vale in Cheshire 2010–2017, Member of House of Lords since 2022
- Luis Troyano (1971–2020), The Great British Bake Off finalist in 2014, lived in Poynton
- Reuben Singh (born 1976 in Poynton), entrepreneur, known in the mid-1990s for his Miss Attitude retail chain
- Andrew Stephenson (born 1981), a former British Conservative Party politician, MP for Pendle from 2010 to 2024, went to Poynton High School

=== Sport ===
- James Meunier (1885 in Poynton – 1957), played first-class cricket and association football for several Football League teams
- Jimmy Murphy (1910–1989), footballer, played 204 games for West Bromwich Albion F.C. & 15 for Wales; moved to Poynton after retiring.
- Dame Sarah Storey (born 1977), road and track racing cyclist, former swimmer, multiple gold medal winner at the Paralympic Games and twice British national track champion
- Sophie Thornhill (born 1996), a visually impaired English racing cyclist who competes in para-cycling tandem track events
- Edward Francis (born 1999), footballer who has played over 150 games

== See also ==
- Listed buildings in Poynton with Worth

== Bibliography ==
- Shercliff, W.H.; D.A. Kitching and J.M .Ryan (1983). Poynton A Coalmining Village; social history, transport and industry 1700–1939. W.H.Shercliff. ISBN 0-9508761-0-0.
