= Reuben Singh =

Britain businessman (born 1976)

- Born: September 20, 1976 (age 49); Poynton, Cheshire, United Kingdom
- Occupation: Businessman
- Years active: 1995 - present
- Known for: Alleging to be one of the youngest self-made millionaires
- Website: www.ishercapital.com and www.alldaypa.co.uk

Reuben Singh (born 20 September 1976) is a British businessman, and the CEO of contact centre company alldayPA and private equity firm Isher Capital. He rose to prominence in the mid-1990s for his Miss Attitude retail chain. He has held many public appointments and was invited by the then Prime Minister Tony Blair to serve on a government advisory panel on small businesses, and on the Competitiveness Council.

Singh served on a seven-man government task force which was asked to review and then report on the Department of Culture, Media, and Sport. He was appointed to the DTIs Competitiveness Council and the Small Business Council by the government. He is also an advocate for the National Living Wage., however AllDayPA and associated companies pay below the living wage, frequently paying minimum wage depending on age bracket.

== Education ==
Singh studied English, business studies, politics and general studies A-levels after doing his GCSEs.

In 2004, he received an honorary doctorate from Guru Nanak Dev University for his contribution to entrepreneurship.

== Career ==
Reuben Singh was born into a wealthy family who ran a large importing business, Sabco, and had business interests in Canada. They came to England in the 1970s and had a family home in Poynton, a village in Cheshire.

His first business, Miss Attitude, was a retail chain which sold girls' accessories and opened in 1995 in the Manchester Arndale Centre. Within a few years, there were more than 100 Miss Attitude shops across the UK. He sold the business in 1999 for an undisclosed price while at university. Reports in the British press initially suggested a sum that ranged wildly between £1 and £22m. Due to the deal being subject to a confidentiality agreement, the actual sum remains unknown.

=== alldayPA ===
Singh launched alldayPA, a contact centre company, in 2000. The company's financial statements recorded increased profits year on year (between 2004 and 2011) and Singh began to build up partnerships with multinational companies such as TMobile and MBNA credit card. The company was estimated to be valued at around the £85 million mark.

Singh remained on the management team of the company until he was declared bankrupt in October 2007 on the petition of Bank of Scotland, in a dispute over a loan he had personally guaranteed (a case that lasted from 2004 until 2007). He was automatically discharged from bankruptcy after one year, as is standard procedure in the UK, in October 2008. He was then reappointed as CEO a few years later.

Singh has since overseen a £15m investment in new technology at the company, and in 2017 saw the largest number of calls answered for its clients in a 12-month period - over 20 million. In 2015 alldayPA moved into a 300-seat call centre in Salford Quays, promising the creation of a further 200 jobs.

Singh further expanded the digital footprint of alldayPA in 2016 and launched an app, investing £250,000. It allows tracking of incoming calls, monitoring of usage cost data and receiving notifications of inbound messages easily.

The company currently has over 24,000 clients is regarded as a specialist in call answering and business support and a key investor in Salford.

In 2021 as Group CEO Singh led a merger of the contact centre company valuing the Group at around £300m

=== Isher Capital ===
Singh is CEO of Isher Capital, a boutique private equity firm launched in 2014 and based in London and Manchester.

In 2018, Isher Capital announced a £20m investment into acquiring smaller contact centres across the UK to push Isher Capital's current contact centre portfolio which is to create and secure 1,500 jobs.

== Philanthropy ==
His charitable work has included supporting the Prince's Trust working with young entrepreneurs and supporting interfaith partnerships in the UK.

In 2015, he launched the Reuben Singh Scholarship to support young people in higher education to work on their business ideas while studying. It was made open to any UK undergraduate who showed business endeavours or entrepreneurial spirit.

== Recognition ==
On 26 January 2003, The World Economic Forum honoured him as one of the "Global Leaders of Tomorrow" (GLT) in Davos. On 13 October 2003 his portrait was included in the UK National Portrait Gallery in a photograph taken by Trevor Ray Hart in December 1999. In 2003 the MIT Boston Technology Review Magazine voted him one of the World's top Innovators. In May 2005 he was invited to Dubai by His Royal Highness Sheikh Mohammed Bin Rashid Al Maktoum the Dubai Crown Prince to address an audience of over 1000 business leaders and entrepreneurs.

He was entered into the 1998 Guinness Book of Records as the world's youngest self-made millionaire and also featured at joint 7th in the 2002 Sunday Times 'Rich List'.

== Financial issues ==
In 2002, an article in the Manchester Evening News – followed a few days later by an article in the Financial Mail – called him little more than a fantasist and that his wealth and business success was considerably less than he claimed. It also revealed that the buyer of Miss Attitude, American financier Gary Klesch, claimed to have bought the debt-laden business for £1.

Singh himself told Sathnam Sanghera of the Financial Times that, "these stories are just rumours based on jealousy and are a total misrepresentation", adding that a confidentiality clause prohibited him from discussing the matter. He then suffered somewhat of a backlash from the media. The Manchester Evening News, which had previously printed positive stories about Singh, began to run negative pieces and sought to expose any discrepancies in his affairs. The paper alleged that he had used the press to his advantage, using inaccurate reports about his business prowess to further inflate his reputation as a successful entrepreneur.

Labour MP Graham Stringer called for tighter regulations after Singh was able to gain a position on a Government advisory panel without any prior checks.

Another company set up by Singh, a health food company called Robson & Steinberg, folded after less than a year of trading, with debts of £250,000.

In 2002 questions were raised about what Singh called the 'Reuben Singh Group of Companies.' According to Singh, these were 12 trading entities dealing in currency trading, property, retail and construction. However a search in the Britain, Companies House listed only two British companies with any net assets of £1000 and £100. The other five British companies that Singh was listed as the director had never filed any accounts but the concern was raised on a £2.64m payment that Singh paid overseas from one of the companies.

Further problems arose in relation to a multimillion-pound overdraft which Singh had guaranteed. In 2004, he was sued by the Royal Bank of Scotland, with judge Michael Kershaw QC ordering Singh to pay the bank £1,229,966 for an overdraft and their legal costs. The judge commented, "(The banker) was, I think, to some extent a victim of Mr Singh's personality as well as Mr Singh's lies." However in 2009 Timothy Fancourt QC rose questions on this decision and "it being considered widely wrong" in relation to personal guarantee given by Singh for the company debt in the 2004 case.
