= Poynton Town Council =

UK local authority for the town of Poynton, Cheshire, England

- Whole council elected every four years
- Council Logo

Type
- Type: Town Council

History
- Founded: 1880

Leadership
- Town Mayor: Hayley Whitaker
- Deputy Mayor: Peter Oakes
- Town Clerk: Haf Barlow

Structure
- Seats: 14 councillors
- Conservative: 14 / 14

Elections
- Last election: 2023
- Next election: 2027

Website
- www.poyntontowncouncil.gov.uk

Poynton with Worth Town Council is the town council for the Cheshire Market Town of Poynton. Formerly known as Poynton with Worth Parish Council, the Council resolved in 2009 to become a Town Council.

On 10 January 2020, the town council was recognized by the NHS Cheshire Clinical Commissioning Group (CCG) and awarded NHS Bronze Self Care Award at a celebration ceremony held at Poynton Civic Hall. The award is part of a programme promoting the benefits of self care throughout local communities.
