= Mercia Mudstone Group =

Group of Triassic rocks in the United Kingdom

- Stratigraphic range: Anisian-Rhaetian
- Type: Group
- Unit of: New Red Sandstone Supergroup
- Sub-units: Stratigraphy
- Underlies: Penarth Group
- Overlies: Sherwood Sandstone Group
- Thickness: over 1,350 m (4,430 ft)

Lithology
- Primary: Mudstone
- Other: Siltstone, sandstone, halite, anhydrite

Location
- Coordinates: 52°18′19″N 1°41′47″W
- Region: Scotland, England, Wales
- Country: United Kingdom

Type section
- Named for: Mercia
- Map of Mercia Mudstone Group's outcrop (Triassic) in Wales and southwest England

The Mercia Mudstone Group is a middle to late Triassic lithostratigraphic group (a sequence of rock strata) which is widespread in Britain, especially in the English Midlands—the name is derived from the ancient kingdom of Mercia which corresponds to that area. It is frequently encountered in older literature as the Keuper Marl or Keuper Marl Series.

The Mercia Mudstone Group is now divided into five formations recognised and mappable across its entire outcrop and subcrop. The formations are a mix of mudstones, siltstones, sandstones and halites. Historically this sequence of rocks has been subdivided in different ways with different names in each of the basinal areas in which it is found. Increasing knowledge of the sequences and the more recent development of seamless electronic mapping by the British Geological Survey (BGS) necessitated a reappraisal of these divisions. A report published by BGS in 2008 recommended the abandonment of previous divisions and naming schemes in favour of a simpler approach which, having now been adopted, is set out below.

- Blue Anchor Formation
- Branscombe Mudstone Formation
- Arden Sandstone Formation
- Sidmouth Mudstone Formation
- Tarporley Siltstone Formation

Older schemes will remain in maps and literature well into the future, providing a source of potential confusion. An example might be the Arden Sandstone Formation which previously enjoyed lower status as a member and also higher status as a group.

== Distribution ==
The group crops out widely across England, representing deposition within numerous Triassic basins, some of which are physically connected at depth. From the south there is an almost continuous outcrop from the Wessex Basin of east Devon, Somerset and Dorset, through the Bristol/South Wales area and the Worcester and Knowle Basins into the English Midlands and including the Needwood Basin of Staffordshire. Northwards the outcrop splits either side of the Pennines where deposition took place across the East Midlands Shelf of Nottinghamshire and through Yorkshire to the North Sea coast at Hartlepool. A western arm includes the Stafford and Cheshire basins, West Lancashire and the Carlisle Basin—the latter are connected at depth beneath the Irish Sea. The group is most thickly developed within the Cheshire Basin (which also extends southwards into north Shropshire) where it attains a thickness in excess of 1,350 m.

== Stratigraphy ==
=== Blue Anchor Formation ===
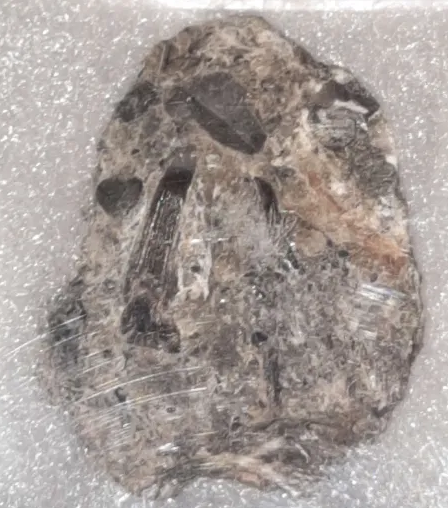
A reptile tooth and a fish tooth from the Blue Anchor Formation, Somerset

The formation is named from the village of Blue Anchor on the coast of west Somerset. It consists largely of green to grey mudstones and siltstones (which gave rise to the earlier name of this sequence, the Tea-green Marls) and varies from around 5 m to 67 m in thickness. Though common to all other areas, the Blue Anchor Formation is absent through erosion in the Stafford Basin and in Lancashire. It is of late Norian to early Rhaetian age. It is overlain by the Westbury Formation of the Penarth Group which represents widespread inundation of the Triassic basins as global sea levels rose.

=== Branscombe Mudstone Formation ===
The formation consists of red-brown mudstones and siltstones in which gypsum/anhydrite occurs as beds, veins and nodules. It was formerly known as the 'Brooks Mill Mudstone Formation' in the Cheshire Basin (and named from a location near Nantwich), as the 'Cropwell Bishop Formation' on the 'East Midlands Shelf' and as the 'Twyning Mudstone Formation' in the Worcester and Knowle basins. It is equivalent to the 'Triton Formation' of the southern North Sea. The Branscombe Mudstone Formation, which is named from Branscombe on the east Devon coast, is of Norian age, i.e. 216–204 mya.

=== Arden Sandstone Formation ===
The formation is named after the Forest of Arden in Warwickshire. The Arden Sandstone is dated to the Late Carnian, and has a noticeable shift in character compares to formations above and below it. It consists of a 2 m to 24 m thickness of mudstones, siltstones and sandstones with occasional pebble beds. It generally has a more greenish grey colour than the formations above and below it though it is not readily distinguishable within the sequence in Cheshire. It has locally yielded fossils suggestive of a marine-influenced environment. The Arden Sandstone is known as North Curry Sandstone which is used as a building material in Somerset, and is also known as the Dunscombe Mudstone formation in Devon, where it composed of halites and purple claystones.

=== Sidmouth Mudstone Formation ===
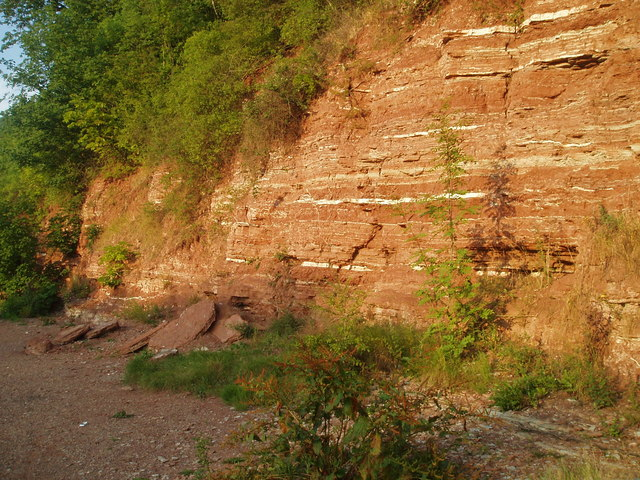
Sidmouth Mudstone formation at Gunthorpe

The formation includes several members which formerly enjoyed 'formation' status. This sequence was formerly known as the Eldersfield Mudstone Formation in the Worcester and Knowle basins and as the (combined) Edwalton, Gunthorpe and Radcliffe formations on the East Midlands Shelf. In the Cheshire Basin it supersedes the former Bollin Mudstone, Northwich Halite, Wych Mudstone, Byley Mudstone and Wilkesley Halite formations, each of which is now accorded 'member' status. It is of Anisian through Ladinian to Carnian age.

==== Wilkesley Halite member ====
Formerly known as the Upper Keuper Saliferous Beds and as the Wilkesley Halite Formation (named from the Cheshire hamlet of Wilkesley), this member is Ladinian to Carnian in age.

==== Wych Mudstone member ====
Formerly known as (the upper part of) the Middle Keuper Marl and as the Wych Mudstone Formation (named from the Wych Brook on the Cheshire/Flintshire/Shropshire border), this member is Anisian to Ladinian in age.

==== Byley Mudstone member ====
Formerly known as (the lower part of) the Middle Keuper Marl and as the Byley Mudstone Formation (named from the Cheshire village of Byley), this member is Anisian in age.

==== Northwich Halite member ====
Formerly known as the Lower Keuper Saliferous Beds and as the Northwich Halite Formation (named from the town of Northwich), this member is Anisian in age.

==== Bollin Mudstone member ====
Formerly known as the Lower Keuper Marl, lower mudstone and also as the Bollin Mudstone Formation (named from the River Bollin in east Cheshire), this member is (?Scythian to) Anisian in age.

In West Cumbria, the Sidmouth Mudstone Formation is divided thus:

==== Singleton Mudstone member ====
Formerly known as the Singleton Mudstone Formation (named from the Lancashire village of Singleton), this member is Early Triassic to Anisian in age.

==== Kirkham Mudstone member ====
Formerly known as the Kirkham Mudstone Formation (named from the small Lancashire town of Kirkham), this member is Anisian to Ladinian in age.

==== Preesall Halite member ====
Formerly known as the Preesall Salt (named from the Lancashire village of Preesall), this member is Anisian to Ladinian in age.

=== Tarporley Siltstone Formation ===
The Tarporley Siltstone Formation (named from the Cheshire village of Tarporley) is Anisian in age and comprises siltstones, mudstones and sandstones. The thickness of the sequence varies from 20 m in parts of the East Midlands to around 220m in the Cheshire Basin. It is encountered in older literature under various guises but commonly as the Keuper Waterstones or simply Waterstones.

These rocks feature prominently along the Mid Cheshire Ridge where they form the summits of such hills as Eddisbury Hill and the Old Pale and the high ground around Tarporley and Utkinton together with small tracts of hilly country around Runcorn and Warrington. The Malpas Sandstone Member is distinguished within this formation.

== See also ==
- Geology of Cheshire
