= St George's Church, Poynton =

Coordinates: 53.3491°N 2.1232°W

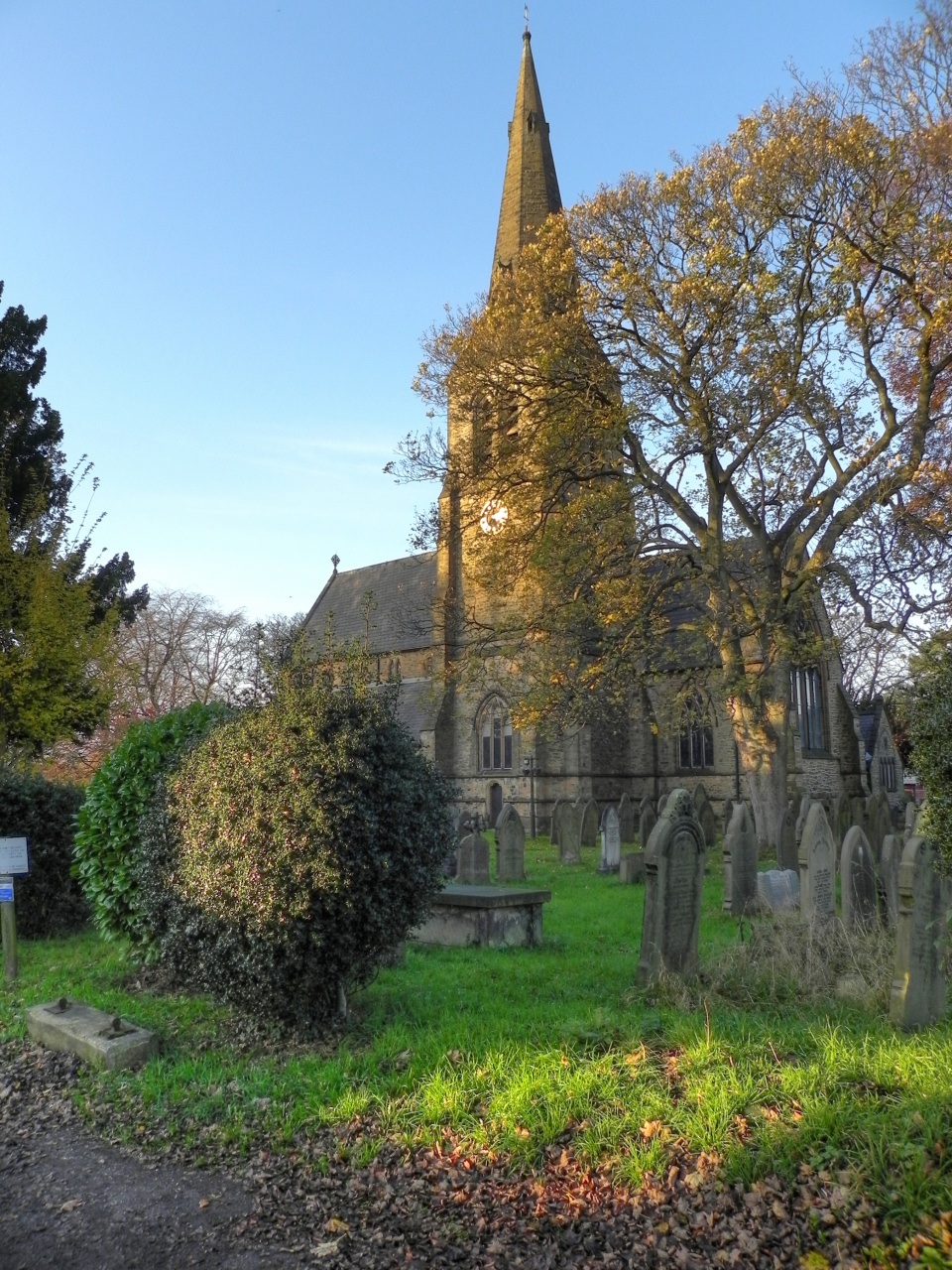
- St George's Church, Poynton

- Location in Cheshire
- OS grid reference: SJ 919 836
- Location: Poynton, Cheshire
- Country: England
- Denomination: Anglican
- Website: St George, Poynton

History
- Status: Parish church
- Dedication: Saint George
- Consecrated: February 1859

Architecture
- Functional status: Active
- Heritage designation: Grade II
- Designated: 17 November 1983
- Architect(s): J. S. Crowther; J. Medland Taylor and Henry Taylor (steeple)

Specifications
- Materials: Stone, slate roofs

Administration
- Province: York
- Diocese: Chester
- Archdeaconry: Macclesfield
- Deanery: Cheadle
- Parish: St George, Poynton

Clergy
- Vicar: Revd Matthew Swires-Hennessy

St George's Church stands in the centre of the town of Poynton, Cheshire, England. It is an active Anglican parish church in the deanery of Cheadle, the archdeaconry of Macclesfield, and the diocese of Chester. The church is recorded in the National Heritage List for England as a designated Grade II listed building. It is the tallest building in Poynton.

== History ==
The original church in the town was a chapel-of-ease to St Peter’s, Prestbury, and was in existence by 1312. The present church was built in 1858–59 on a site nearer to the town centre to a design by J. S. Crowther. It was consecrated in February 1859 by the Bishop of Chester. It became a separate parish in its own right in 1871. The steeple, designed by J. Medland Taylor and Henry Taylor, was added in 1884–85. In 1998 the interior of the church was re-ordered.

== Architecture ==
=== Exterior ===
St George's is constructed in yellow rubble stone from the Hig Lane quarry, and has dressings in stone from Lyme Handley. It is roofed in slate. The plan consists of a nave with a six-bay clerestory, north and south five-bay aisles, a south porch, a chancel, and a steeple at the southeast corner. The tower has buttresses and an octagonal stair turret, and is surmounted by a broached spire with lucarnes. In the top stage are double louvred bell openings. Along the sides of the aisles are two-light windows, and along the clerestory are alternate two-light and circular windows. At the west end of the nave are two narrow lancet windows, above which is a sexfoil rose window. The east window has four lights containing Geometric tracery.

=== Interior ===
Inside the church is a three-bay arcade carried on octagonal piers. In the chancel are a stone sedilia and piscina. The stained glass in the east and southeast windows is by O'Connor (probably Arthur). At the east end of the north aisle is a window dating from about 1866 by John Adam Heaton. A window in the southwest of the church dating from about 1935 was designed by Edwin Wright, and commemorates the Mothers' Union. The two-manual organ was built in 1972 by Smethurst of Manchester, replacing a three-manual 19th-century organ by Nicholson and Lord that had been rebuilt by Austin Jones of Pendleton in 1925. There is a ring of six bells, all cast in 1887 by John Taylor & Co of Loughborough. There is a further, unused, bell dating from 1835 by Thomas Mears II at the Whitechapel Bell Foundry.

== External features ==
The churchyard contains Poynton’s War Memorial Cross and the war graves of ten British service personnel, three from World War I and seven from World War II.

== See also ==
- Listed buildings in Poynton with Worth
- List of works by J. S. Crowther
