= Wem–Bridgemere–Red Rock Fault System =

Seismic fault zone of England

The Wem–Bridgemere–Red Rock Fault System is a complex zone of intersecting faults which defines the south-eastern boundary of the Cheshire Basin, a deep sedimentary basin in the northwest of England and extending south into the northern Midlands. It includes the Red Rock Fault, Bridgemere Fault and Wem Fault and reaches from Shropshire through eastern Cheshire to southeast Lancashire.

At Norbury Brook, Poynton, on the border of Cheshire and Greater Manchester, the Millstone Grit of the Pennines makes a 200 metres (660 ft) downfall to be covered to the west by the glacial tills of the Cheshire Plain, formed by the retreating ice age glaciers. To the east of the fault there are the coal measures of the Carboniferous period, which unlike those in the Lancashire Coalfield are missing the top layers. Here there are outcrops of the Middle Coal Measures. Coal from these strata, particularly the Four Foot mine (or seam), the Five Foot mine and the Accommodation mine was extracted in the nineteenth and early twentieth century.

The two masses are still moving and regularly generate small earthquakes usually less than 3.0 on the Richter scale along its length. In 2002, there was a swarm of over 110 earthquakes felt in Manchester, close to the fault, over a period of a few months. The strongest was 3.9, on Thursday, 24 October 2002 at 08:25 GMT.

== Bibliography ==
Brenchley, P. J.; Peter Franklin Rawson (2006). The geology of England and Wales. Geological Society. ISBN 1-86239-200-5.
