= Listed buildings in Poynton with Worth =

Poynton with Worth is a civil parish in Cheshire East, England. It contains 19 buildings that are recorded in the National Heritage List for England as designated listed buildings, all of which are at Grade II. This grade is the lowest of the three gradings given to listed buildings and is applied to "buildings of national importance and special interest". The parish contains the town of Poynton and surrounding countryside. The listed buildings include houses, farmhouses, two milestones, a guide post, a former generator house, a bridge over the Macclesfield Canal, an ice house, and a boundary stone.

Name and location	Photograph	Date	Notes
Lostock Hall Farmhouse; 53.34861°N 2.13871°W	—	Late 16th century	Originally a timber-framed farmhouse, it was extended and encased in brick, which is rendered, in the 19th century. It has a Kerridge stone-slate roof, is in two storeys, and has a front of three bays, with two added later on the right. There are two sash windows, the other windows being casements. Inside, the timber-framing is almost intact.
Brook House Farmhouse; 53.34749°N 2.11254°W	—	17th century	The house was extended in the 19th century. The original section is timber-framed on a sandstone base, its infill being partly in brick and partly plastered. The rest of the house is in rendered brick, and it has a Kerridge stone-slate roof. The windows are 20th-century casements.
Dog Hill Green; 53.35803°N 2.13689°W		17th century	This originated as a timber-framed farmhouse and it was altered and extended in the 19th century with rebuilding of the walls. It in brick on a sandstone plinth, and has a Kerridge stone-slate roof. The house has a rectangular plan, it is in two storeys, and has a four-bay front. The windows are horizontally sliding sashes.
Haybrook; 53.35378°N 2.13941°W		17th century	A farmhouse that was rewalled and extended in the 19th century. It is in brick, partly rendered and partly painted, and has a Kerridge stone-slate roof. The house has a rectangular plan, and is in two storeys. On the front are horizontally sliding sash windows and casement windows.
Worth Hall; 53.35178°N 2.09733°W	—	17th century	Originally a farmhouse, later converted into three flats. It is in sandstone and has a Kerridge stone-slate roof. The building is in two storeys, and has a west front of three bays. The windows are mullioned and some contain sashes.
Ice house 53.35543°N 2.10748°W		c. 1758	An ante-chamber was added to the ice house in the 19th century. The original part is in brick, and the ante-chamber is in sandstone. The entrance passage is badly damaged. The ante-chamber has a barrel vaulted roof and contains preparation benches. The ice house is also a scheduled monument.
Waterloo; 53.34453°N 2.10272°W	—	1815	This originated as a beam engine house, and was converted into a domestic house in about 1850. It is rendered, and has a Welsh slate roof. On the front are three gables at the ends of parallel ranges, the left in one storey, and the others are in two storeys. The central gable contains a datestone, and the gables have decoratively painted bargeboards. The windows are sashes.
Worth Clough; 53.34946°N 2.10082°W		1815	A terrace of 14 houses built for the 7th Viscount Bulkeley. They are in painted brick with tiled roofs, and were altered in the 19th and 20th centuries. The cottages are in two storeys, and each has a two-bay front. The central three bays are gabled and contain a plaque with the date. The windows are casements.
Milestone, London Road North; 53.36089°N 2.11602°W	—	1824 (probable)	The milestone consists of a rectangular sandstone stone with a semicircular head. It carries a cast iron plaque inscribed with the distances in miles to London, Macclesfield and Stockport.
Milestone, London Road South; 53.34769°N 2.12311°W		1824 (probable)	The plaque is original; the stone was replaced in the late 20th century. The stone is lancet-shaped sandstone, and the plaque is inscribed with the distances in miles to London, Macclesfield and Stockport.
50 London Road North; 53.35260°N 2.11941°W		Early 19th century	A lodge in roughcast brick on a sandstone plinth with a pyramidal Welsh slate roof. It has a square plan, is in two storeys, and has a three-bay entrance front. A band runs between the storeys. In the lower storey, the central bay has a semicircular arch containing a doorway. On each side of this is a rectangular window with a round window above. In the upper storey is a central casement window.
Bridge No. 14; 53.34965°N 2.08104°W		c. 1830	An accommodation bridge over the Macclesfield Canal, for which the engineer was William Crosley. It has a pair of sandstone piers with square pilasters at each end, with slots carrying a wooden roadway.
Southside and Rose Cottage; 53.35315°N 2.10737°W	—	1846	Originating as colliery offices and a cottage, the building was later converted into two houses. They are built in brick with sandstone dressings and have a Welsh slate roof. The former offices have an L-shaped plan, are in a single storey, and have a six-bay front. The windows have semicircular heads. The cottage is in two storeys, and has a symmetrical three-bay front. The windows are sashes.
44 and 46 London Road North; 53.35216°N 2.11972°W		1854	Originating as a newsroom and library, the building was converted into two cottages, and two dormers were added in 1909. It is in brick on a sandstone plinth, with sandstone dressings and a Welsh slate roof. The cottages are in 1½ storeys, and they have a six-bay front. The outer bays are single storey lean-tos, and the middle two bays contain a projecting gabled porch. The windows are casements. All the gables and eaves contain decorated woodwork, with finials on the gables.
Boundary stone 53.36526°N 2.09357°W		1857	The boundary stone is on Norbury Hollow Bridge, and was re-set in 1928. It consists of a sandstone block set in the parapet of the bridge and it carries an inscription.
St George's Church; 53.34912°N 2.12311°W		1858–59	The church was designed by J. S. Crowther in 13th-century style, and the steeple was completed in 1884–85. It is built in stone and has a slate roof. The church consists of a nave with a clerestory, aisles, a south porch, a chancel and a steeple at the southeast corner. The steeple comprises a tower with a staircase turret and a broach spire with lucarnes. At the west end are two lancet windows and a rose window. The east window contains Geometric tracery.
Generator House, Barlowfold; 53.36138°N 2.12074°W	—	c. 1890	The generator house was built to supply electricity for Barlowfold. It is constructed in pre-cast concrete sections. The building is in a single storey, it is symmetrical, has a two-bay front, and contains iron casement windows. Inside is a turbine electric generator.
Guide post 53.34930°N 2.12225°W		1897	The guide post is combined with a fountain and a lamp standard, and was built to celebrate Queen Victoria's Diamond Jubilee. It is in cast iron and has a square base and a moulded plinth with fountains on three sides and a plaque on the fourth. Around the plinth are bowls and basins. On the plinth stands a fluted column supporting four lamps.
War Memorial; 53.34909°N 2.12273°W		1920	The war memorial is in the churchyard of St George's Church. It is in granite and consists of a Latin cross with decorative scrollwork. The cross stands on a tall octagonal shaft rising from a square plinth on a base of three steps. There are inscriptions on the plinth and the names of those lost in the first World War, and on the steps of the base are tablets with further inscriptions and the names of those lost in the Second World War. Around the memorial is a kerbed enclosure.

== See also ==
- Listed buildings in Hazel Grove and Bramhall
- Listed buildings in Marple, Greater Manchester
- Listed buildings in Pott Shrigley
- Listed buildings in Adlington
