= Cheshire Plain =

English plain

Coordinates: 53°12′N 2°28′W

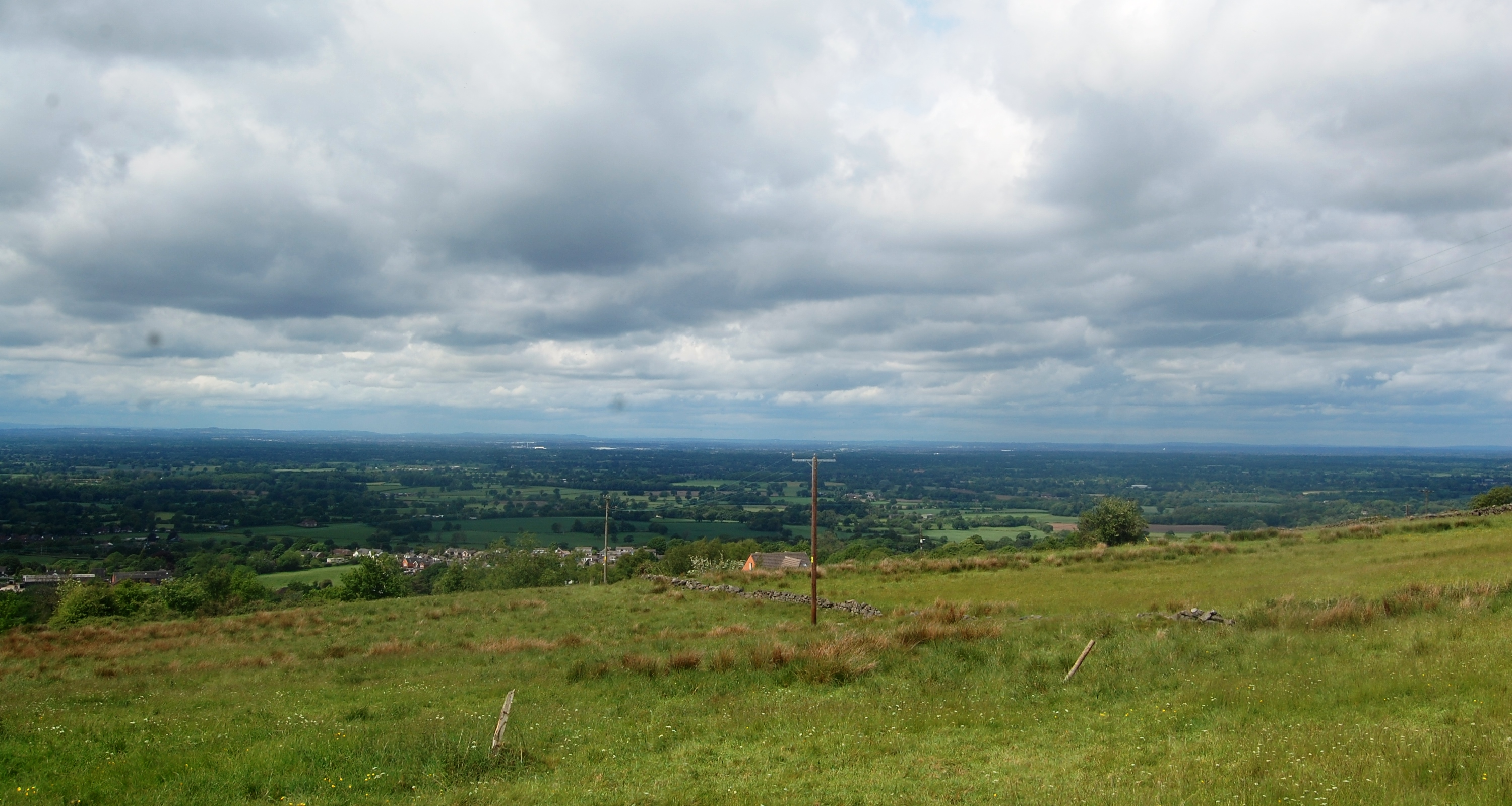
Cheshire Plain from Mow Cop

The Cheshire Plain is a relatively flat expanse of lowland within the county of Cheshire in North West England but extending south into Shropshire. It extends from the Mersey Valley in the north to the Shropshire Hills in the south, bounded by the hills of North Wales to the west and the foothills of the Pennines to the north-east. The Wirral Peninsula lies to the north-west whilst the plain merges with the South Lancashire Plain in the embayment occupied by Manchester to the north. In detail, the plain comprises two areas with distinct characters, the one to the west of the Mid Cheshire Ridge and the other, larger part, to its east.

The plain is the surface expression of the Cheshire Basin, a deep sedimentary basin that extends north into Lancashire and south into Shropshire. It assumed its current form as the ice-sheets of the last glacial period melted away between 20,000 and 15,000 years ago leaving behind a thick cover of glacial till and extensive tracts of glacio-fluvial sand and gravel.

The primary agricultural use of the Cheshire Plain is dairy farming, creating the general appearance of enclosed hedgerow fields.

Meteorologists use the term Cheshire Gap when referring to the lowlands of the Cheshire Plain, providing as they do a passage between the Clwydian Hills, in Wales on the one hand and the Peak District and South Pennines on the other. Weather systems are often guided down this "gap", penetrating much further inland than elsewhere along the coast of the Irish Sea.

== See also ==
- Geology of Cheshire
- Geology of Alderley Edge
