= Cheshire Basin =

Sedimentary basin in England

The Cheshire Basin is a late Palaeozoic and Mesozoic sedimentary basin extending under most of the county of Cheshire in northwest England. It extends northwards into the Manchester area and south into Shropshire. The basin possesses something of the character of a half-graben as its deepest extent is along its eastern and southeastern margins, where it is well defined by a series of sub-parallel faults, most important of which is the Red Rock Fault. These faults divide the basin from the older Carboniferous rocks of the Peak District and the North Staffordshire Coalfield.

In terms of its architecture, the basin is sometimes considered to be divided into two sub-basins: the more southerly Wem–Audlem Sub-basin and the Sandbach–Knutsford Sub-basin to its northeast.

The basin fill is mainly Permian and Triassic sandstones and mudstones, but it also incorporates economically important halite beds. The sequences referred to the Sherwood Sandstone Group and the overlying Mercia Mudstone Group are the thickest in England. An isolated outlier of Jurassic rocks occurs within the basin at Prees in north Shropshire.

The basin is just one part of a wider complex of basins that includes the Worcester Basin, the Stafford Basin and the East Irish Sea Basin. These basins developed while the crust of this region was experiencing east–west tension during the Permian period. It is traversed by a series of largely north–south aligned normal faults, some of which help to define the Mid Cheshire Ridge and Alderley Edge, two upstanding areas within the Cheshire Plain.

== Tectonics ==
The Permo-Triassic rocks of the Cheshire Basin are heavily faulted. The longer axis of the basin trends towards the NNE, being flanked on the west by the Carboniferous rocks of north Wales and to the east by the Pennine foothills. The dips in the Permo-Triassic rocks reflect the steady swing of the beds round the north-east edge rim of the Cheshire basin, except to the north of Alderley Edge, where a gentle anticlinal fold centred on Wilmslow plunges westward and is intersected by a number of north–south tension faults.

Crustal extension controls the tectonic accommodation space available for sediments in rift settings and may be defined by the structural and depositional geometry of sedimentary successions observed on seismic data and the rate of subsidence through time as represented by the accommodation of sediment. The characteristic features of each are dependent on three variables: the time taken for deposition; the interplay between tectonics and eustasy and the lithology (thus facies) of the succession observed. The Sherwood Sandstone Group has been considered to represent a syn-rift phase of fluvial deposition throughout Europe, with the overlying Mercia Mudstone Group interpreted as the succeeding phase of deposition in an evaporitic seaway during post-rift thermal subsidence. More recently, however, there has been the recognition that it is the Mercia Mudstone Group which is seen to thicken markedly into faults imaged on seismic data rather than the Sherwood Sandstone Group. This work demonstrates the Mercia Mudstone Group to be a syn-rift phase of deposition, with the fine grained nature of the sedimentary record at this time controlled by the prevailing arid climate. Such conditions were not conducive to the large-scale and rapid movement of sediments from the hinterlands raised by relative footwall uplift, thus the sediments are fine grained. The minor thickening of the Sherwood Sandstone Group into faults is interpreted to be a combination of minor extension in the early Triassic superimposed on thermal subsidence inherited from the important regional phase of extension in the early Permian. Analysis of the timing of fault growth indicates a larger proportion of fault-controlled, synsedimentary movement occurred during the mid-to-late Triassic (Mercia Mudstones) rather than the early Triassic (Sherwood).

=== Post-Triassic folding ===
Using techniques of seismic sequence stratigraphy the English Permo-Triassic megasequence can be divided into three sequences bounded at the top and base by local or regional unconformities. Construction of a seismic sequence stratigraphy allows the examination of the interaction of tectonics and sedimentation. On this basis the Cheshire Basin can be divided roughly into two areas: a westerly area close to the western basin margin and an easterly area nearer to the Carboniferous Wem/Red Rock Fault. The Red Rock Fault – really a group of faults – is the name given locally to one which happens to throw Carboniferous and Permo-Triassic rocks together. It runs north–south, a trend followed by the Kirkleyditch and the Alderley faults. Seismic interpretation shows that deposition in the western area was essentially post-rift, resulting in packages of parallel reflectors on seismic data.

The movements (Wem–Red Rock Fault) which in late Carboniferous times initiated the Rossendale Anticline and the Pennine uplift were repeated later probably during the Alpine of Tertiary age, but the major fold of this date resulted in the Cheshire Basin as it is today, in which the Permo-Trias is preserved.

== See also ==
- Geology of Alderley Edge
