= Geology of Alderley Edge =

Hill in Cheshire, United Kingdom

Coordinates: 53.298°N 2.212°W

Alderley Edge
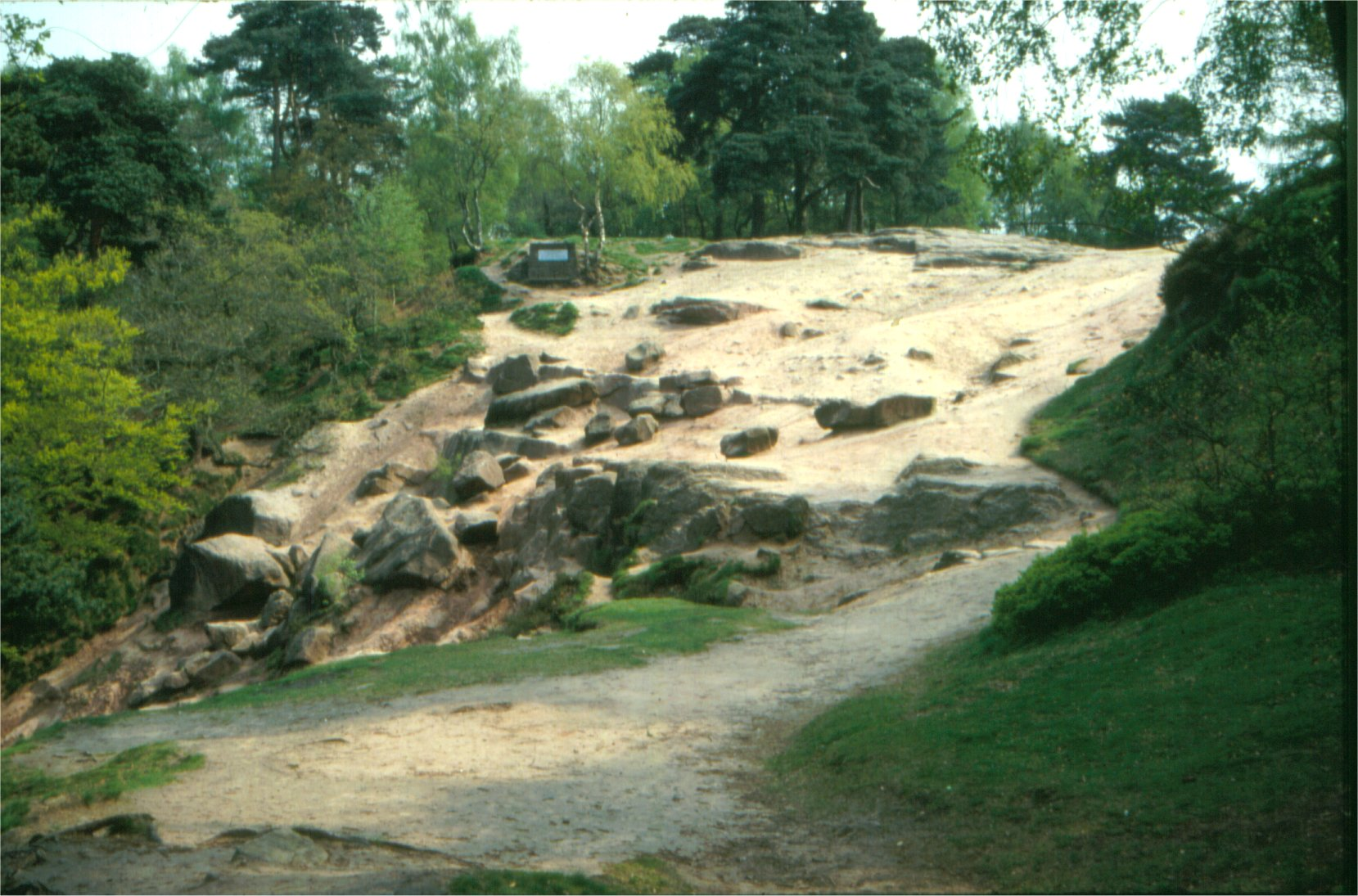
- Stormy Point

Highest point
- Elevation: 183 m (600 ft)

Geography
- Location: Cheshire, England
- OS grid: SJ870760
- Topo map: OS Landranger 118

One of the classic locations for the study of Triassic sandstones in the UK is at Alderley Edge in Cheshire. Numerous scientists from the early 19th century up to the present day have studied the area and it is a popular field site for universities around the UK.

The sandstones also provide important insights into the nature of continental natural gas and petroleum reservoirs.

== Nomenclature ==
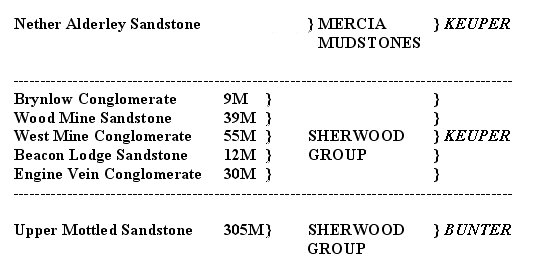
Correlation of beds and formations

The nomenclature of the English Triassic was rewritten in the 1980s and many of the previous names were changed. The classic terms 'Bunter' and 'Keuper' have now been abandoned, and the formations now recognized in the UK Triassic sequences, constitute three major stratigraphic units:

- the Sherwood Sandstone Group (arenaceous siliciclastic) (equivalent to the Bunter and lower Keuper)
- the Mercia Mudstone Group (argillaceous, halitic) (equivalent to the Keuper Marl)
- the Penarth Group (not seen at Alderley).

In order to maintain an understanding of earlier work, the older names with appropriate cross references are used in places.

== History ==
The geology of Alderley Edge has fascinated people from all walks of life, scientists, miners and tourists for hundreds of years. In 1811 Bakewell described it thus:

"The hill is evidently of alluvial formation, being composed chiefly of gravel and soft white and reddish sandstone, – the white is intermixed with rounded quartz pebbles, the red with particle of mica. In some parts the red and white sandstone assume a nearly stratified appearance, in others the red stone intersects the white in very thin seams, branching in various directions. In the white sandstone are found various ores of lead as small portions of galena and in the same granular state intermixed with sandstone. In other places particles of blue and brown were collected in nodules of various sizes and imbedded along with pebbles in the sand rock like currants in a pudding."

In 1882, Ormerod in his book The History of Cheshire describes it as follows:

"Alderley Edge is an abrupt and elevated ridge, formerly the site of a beacon, which bears the appearance of having been detached by some great convulsion of nature from the range of the Macclesfield hills. Near the summit cobalt ore, lead and copper have been got in small quantities. The sides are varied with cultivated land, wood and rock; and the entire mass presents a striking object to all the surrounding district over which it commands a most extensive prospect."

== Regional setting ==
The Alderley sandstones are classic redbed deposits, a distinctive sedimentary facies traditionally associated with non-marine depositional environments such as alluvial floodplains and arid deserts. They form part of the Cheshire Basin and the Edge is one of the classic onshore localities in the UK for their study.

They also provide important insights to the nature and evolution of deformation in continental clastic natural gas and petroleum reservoirs, such as those of the Rotliegend in the Southern North Sea Gas Basin and of the Sherwood Sandstone Group in the adjacent East Irish Sea Basin. Analogues for cemented cataclastic faults, which can compartmentalise reservoirs, are well displayed by the arrays of deformation bands within the Alderley outcrops.

=== Permo–Triassic horizon ===
By the start of the Triassic period, around 252 million years ago, the Zechstein Sea of the Permian period had retreated and the climate had become a little wetter giving a gentle transition making the Permian-Triassic boundary uncertain in northern England as there are no fossil horizons or facies changes that make a definitive separation possible as there in continental Europe. The horizon however is characterised by a succession of red marls (calcareous mudstones) deposited on coastal flats, followed by the Sherwood Sandstone (formerly Bunter Sandstone). The 'British Isles' were not islands, but had an intra-continental position within Pangea. The area that now constitutes Great Britain was drifting northwards as Pangea rotated, was at a latitude of 10° – 20° north, equivalent to the latitude of the present day Sahara desert. Erosion of the then recently uplifted landmass formed Aeolian deposits in the southern and central parts of the country. This iron-rich silica sandstone was both oxidised and reworked to give it its red colouration and its name, "New Red Sandstone". British deposits of the era consist of these red beds, alluvial, fluvial and lake deposits, with some shallow-water marine and evaporite deposits. These Permo-Triassic outcrops can be seen on either side of the Pennines and in Devon. Within the main central England basin (Staffordshire and Cheshire), the deposits are dominated by pebbly sandstones and conglomerates (Chester Pebble Beds, Wilmslow and Wildmoor Sandstones), which have been interpreted as the deposits of a fluvial system running within well-confined channels. The Sherwood Sandstone Group comprises a series of conglomerates, coarse sandstones and mudstones. The Chester pebble beds to the south of Alderley represent material deposited in alluvial fan or braided river system. The finer sediments of the Wilmslow and Helsby Sandstone to the west of Alderley represent alluvial deposits of low sinuosity channels. The Alderley area represents the midpoint between the full braided river system and the lower energy area. Minor aeolian dunes and channel infill deposits in the Wilmslow Sandstones indicate an inter channel area or seasonal drying of some of the minor river channels.

=== Lower Triassic ===
The Sherwood Sandstone Group can be broadly divided into an upper (previously Keuper) and a lower (previously Bunter) unit, at the level of a widely recognized intra-Sherwood Sandstone disconformity perhaps within the uppermost Lower Triassic This disconformity separates two quite distinct environmental systems. This disconformity is widely assumed to be equivalent to the Hardegsen disconformity of the central European/Southern North Sea Basin, although the age of this disconformity is not constrained as it is in Europe by biostratigraphical indicators

Below the intra-Sherwood Sandstone disconformity these deposits are dominated by evidence of a major braided river system, this river system responsible for transporting the sand and gravel to the Alderley area was named by Wills (1970) the Budleighensis River, after Budleigh Salterton in Devon, where its existence was first established.

Within the western onshore basins there are several clues indicating that the river flowed in a northerly direction. Within the Alderley conglomerates, there are well rounded liver coloured quartzite pebbles from a source found only in the Variscan mountains of Brittany, France. Some pebbles contain microfossils of marine animals (Lingula lesueuri and Orthis budleighensis) which can be traced to the same source area in the Armorican Massif.

Pebbles of Carboniferous limestone and reworked earlier Triassic sandstones indicate their source as being from the South Derbyshire area and the Clent Formation south of Birmingham respectively. There is further evidence from the distribution of the pebbles themselves, the average size of the stones on the southern margin of the basin is noticeably larger than that to the north, which is consistent with a flow of water from the south.

The river system flowed northwards through the Wessex Basin, the Worcester Basin, the various midland basins and on into the East Irish Sea Basin just to the north west of the Alderley area. A second branch probably flowed eastwards into the southern North Sea. This Budleighensis river system is evident by a series of sandstones with generally northwards directed palaeocurrents, which can be traced along a south to north line along the central parts of Britain.

Indications are that it probably had large seasonal changes in discharge, evident by cross-bedded sandstones deposited at stages of lower flow, although whilst the flow was seasonal, it is perhaps doubtful if this system was ephemeral in nature for there is relatively little evidence of any large-scale aeolian sandstones in the basinal settings of the Midlands. It is clear that more locally sourced material such as carboniferous limestone and reworked earlier Triassic sandstone from the Clent Formation just south of Birmingham were also important components of the river systems as they flowed northwards giving some indication of the relief of the basin margins.

Towards the end of the Triassic, the sea level once again rose and periodic flooding caused by high spring tides and strong on-shore winds led to the formation of on shore saline lagoons or sabkha environments. Intense evaporation from these lagoons resulted in the precipitation of a carbonate-sulphate complex and the thick halite beds as seen to the south west of Alderley in Northwich where the salt is mined commercially. It was in this type of environment that the Mercia Mudstone Group (formerly Keuper Marl) was deposited.

The sequence of formations in the Sherwood and Mercia mudstone groups in this region illustrates clearly the upward transition from continental fluvial to deltaic and littoral marine and ultimately to the hypersaline lake epeiric sea environment of the Mercia Mudstone group.

== Alderley Sandstones ==
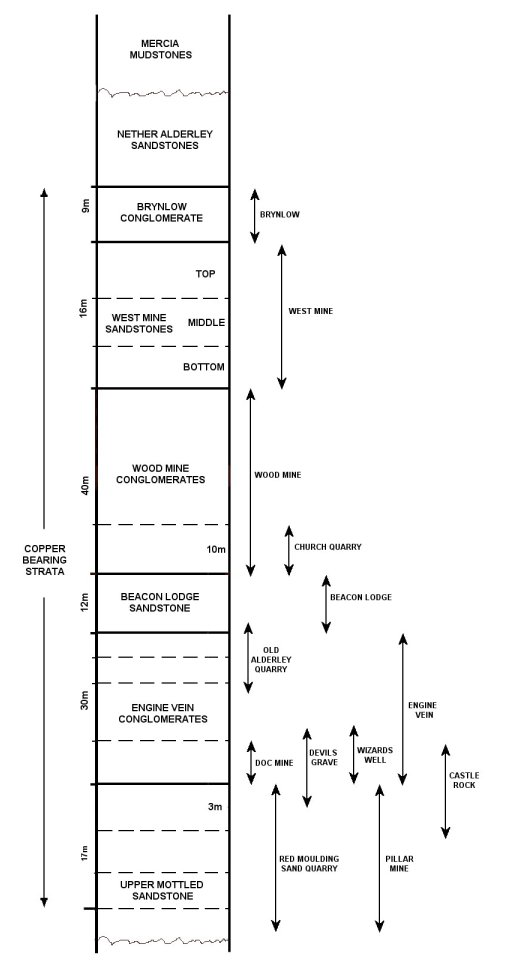
Stratigraphic column and locations seen at Alderley

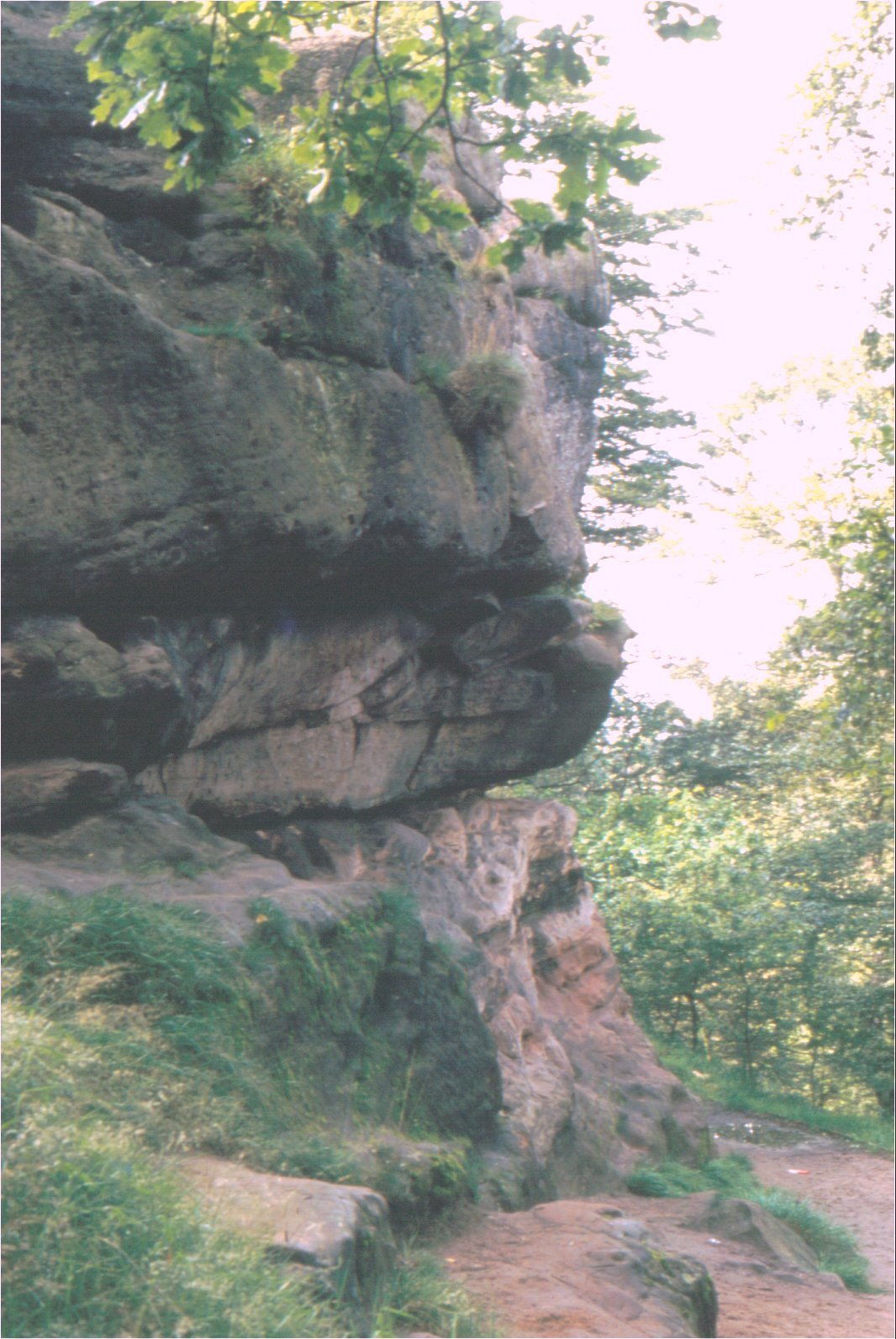
Castle Rock: showing the Engine Vein Conglomerate resting on the Wilmslow Sandstone

The upper division (ex-Keuper) follows the lower (ex-Bunter) unconformably. The upper is very thick and in Cheshire reaches a thickness of about 1250 m, locally conglomeritic, but consists mainly of fine water lain sandstones.

Interest in the area took off with vigour in the mid-19th century with the first real efforts made to quantify the strata of the country using the new mapping methods that geologists like William Smith had pioneered. The economical value of the area in those times lead to a detailed examination of Alderley. Boreholes starting to be used for geological logging and research whereas previously they had been used simply for wells with no real interest taken in the actual geological make up of the rock below. In 1894, a borehole was sunk to 280 ft below surface and the strata recorded in a scientific manner. This borehole, the Isaac Massey (NGR SK 84237819) was the first serious attempt to understand the geology of the area. The area has since been subject of much more detailed research and still provides many clues to basin formation and mineralization processes. The original borehole was crude by today’s standards but it gave an overview of the strata below the Alderley area.

Now the Wilmslow Formation (part of the Sherwood Sandstone Group), the lower Triassic was previously a threefold division, the Lower Mottled Sandstone, The Pebble Beds and the Upper Mottled Sandstone (only the later is seen at Alderley), which merged into the Conglomerates of the upper Triassic. The Upper Mottled Sandstone – now the lower Wilmslow Member – is a medium- to coarse-grained friable false-bedded sandstone with abrupt colour changes from bright red to white. It is composed mainly of rounded grains but sub-angular grains also occur. Normally the rock lacks coherence and weathers into sand down to 6 m and even unweathered rock can be crushed to sand easily. However, near faults, ghost crystals of baryte make the sandstone harder and resistant.

=== Lower sandstones ===
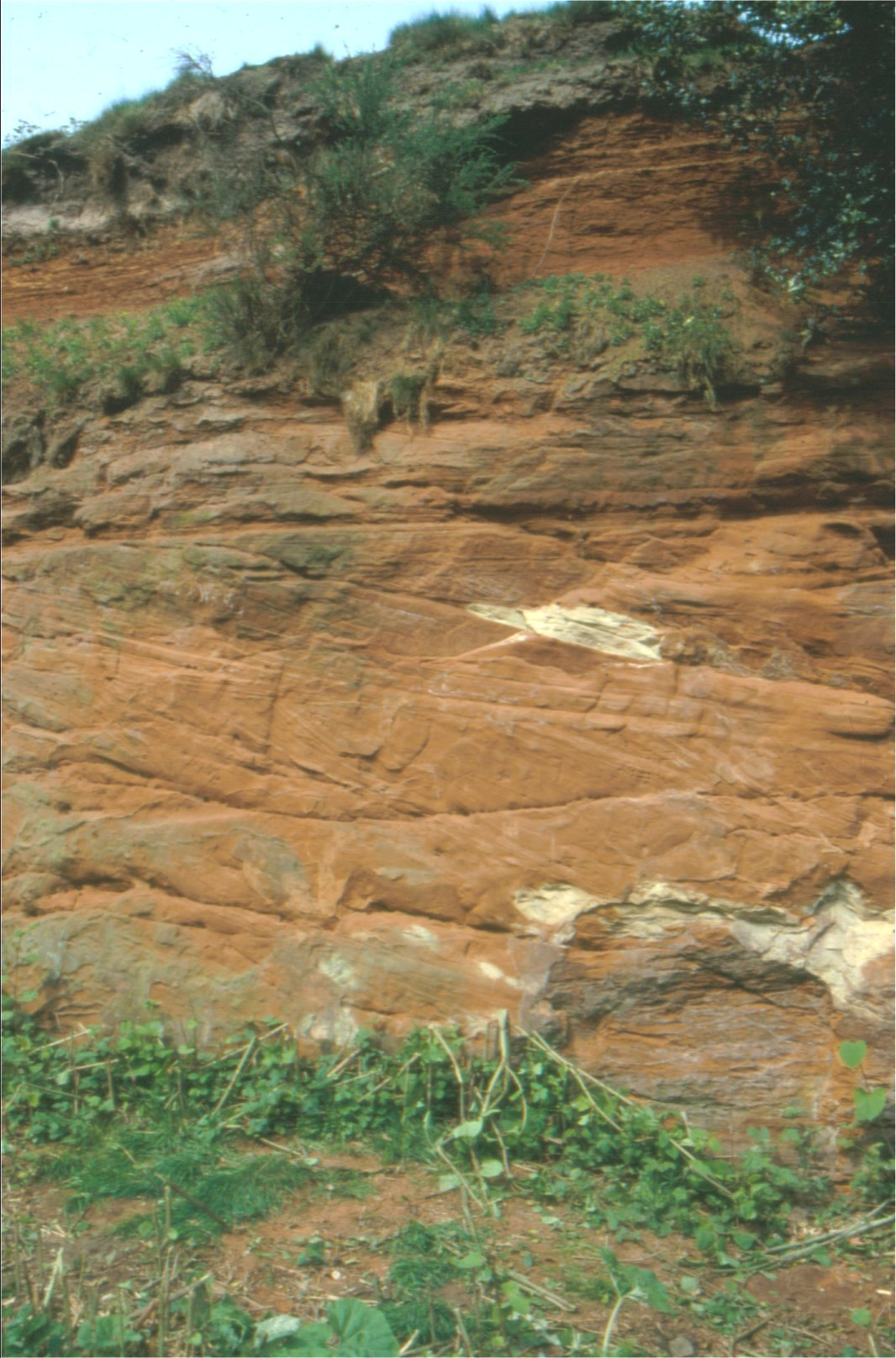
Structure in the Red Moulding Sand

The lower sandstone (Upper Mottled Sandstone) has a full thickness of 305 m generally a reddy brown colour with some white patches, which give it its name, these patches are often associated with organic nuclei. The sandstone has two distinct types, a bright dark red known as the Moulding Sand and mottled paler sandstone. The Moulding Sand is so called after its use in the foundry industry for making the casting moulds. Resting on top is a conglomerate, which attains thickness of 30 m; it is the Engine Vein Conglomerate. These conglomerates are made up of angular grained sands which were laid down in cyclic sequences. This sequence is an upward fining sequence of three or four cycles.

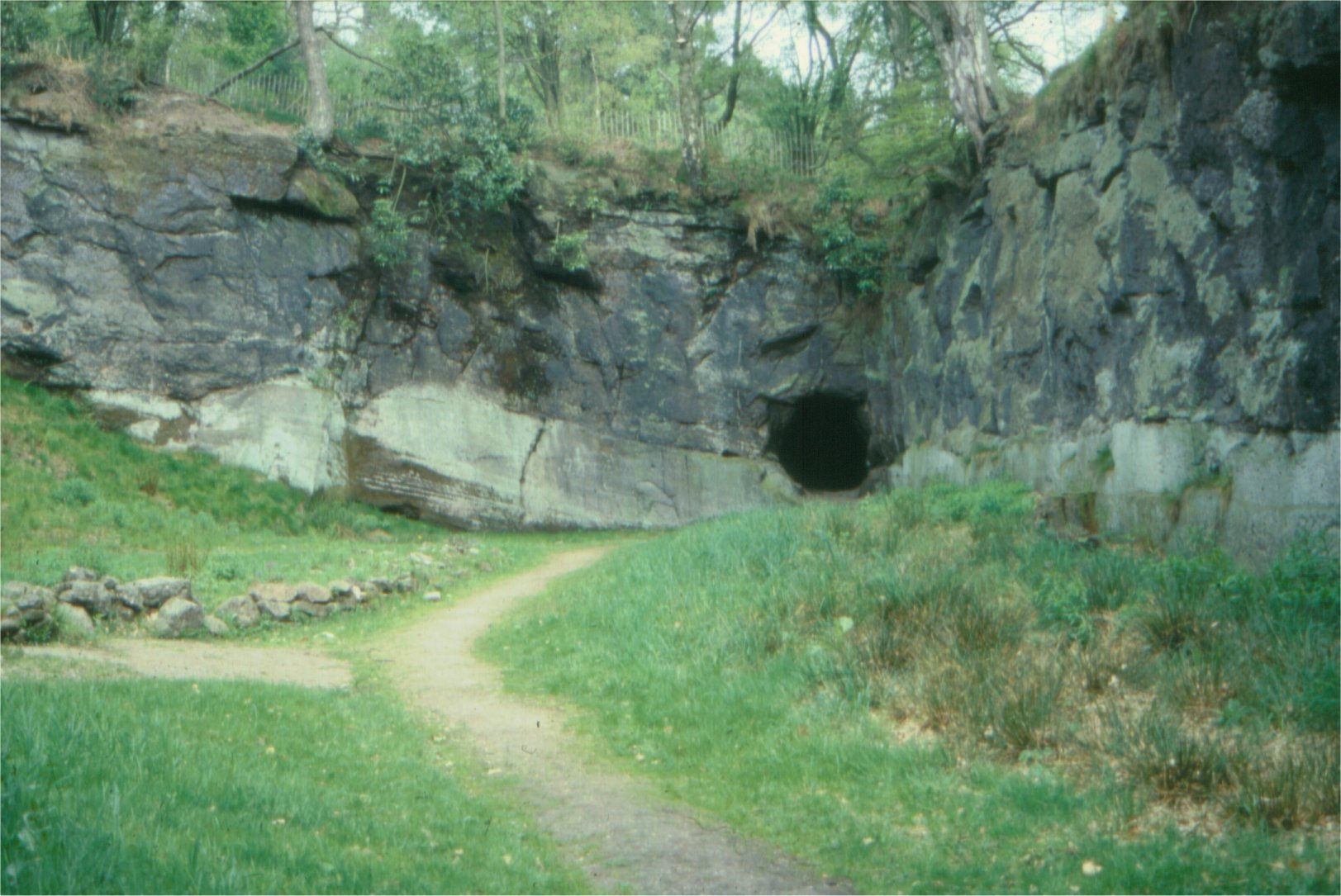
Wood Mine Conglomerate at Church Quarry

Three other main beds are seen at Alderley Edge:

- Friable mottled sandstone similar to the Upper Mottled Sandstone, the Beacon Lodge Sandstone which attains a thickness of 12 m and can be seen at Beacon Lodge resting above the conglomerates.
- A conglomerate which overlies the Brynlow and is seen by the site of the old mines and is thus called the West Mine Conglomerate. There are ten upward fining cycles in this rock and it has a thickness of 40 m.
- A creamy white sandstone, which lacks the pebbly beds and is upward fining; it overlies the West Mine Conglomerate and is seen in outcrops at Brynlow. This is the Wood Mine Sandstone it has a thickness of 16 m.

Two other minor beds are seen to the southeast of these areas a single cycle conglomerate/sandstone/marl of 9 m thickness known as the Brynlow conglomerate and a final bed that overlies the Brynlow Conglomerate and is named the Nether Alderley Sandstone. On top of the Nether Alderley Sandstone lie the Mercia Mudstones which attain a thickness of 300 m, but these are only seen on the lower plains, it is in these beds that the halite lies.

Mottling in the red blocky mudstone is of two main types,

- A light red or greyish green coloured irregular sandstone, the lithology of which is different from the main unit. The boundary between this and the main unit is not clear-cut and it is suggested that they are caused by the incorporation of the material whilst the whole was semi-liquid. The incorporated grey owes its colour to the same cause as the grey bands (Not yet fully explained but indications are that the origin was included organic material)
- The second includes the "fish eyes" which occur throughout the marls in the red mudstones. These are small spherical regions in which the iron oxide colouration has been discharged about a centre. A minute speck is usually found in the middle. The colour has been attributed to the decay of small specks of organic matter but recent work suggests that a radioactive centre may be responsible. Other examples of this secondary change of colour from red to greenish-grey are seen along joint planes where the altered zone may only be a fraction of a millimetre thick and sometimes on the cheeks of a gypsum vein.

The ferruginous colour pigmenting is finely disseminated over the surface of individual grains and accounts for a very small percentage of the rock. It is thought that where the rock is grey or grey green either from primary or secondary causes, the oxide has been chemically removed during deposition and thus unmasking the true colour of the minerals in the sediment. The active principle is still unknown.

=== Conglomerate ===
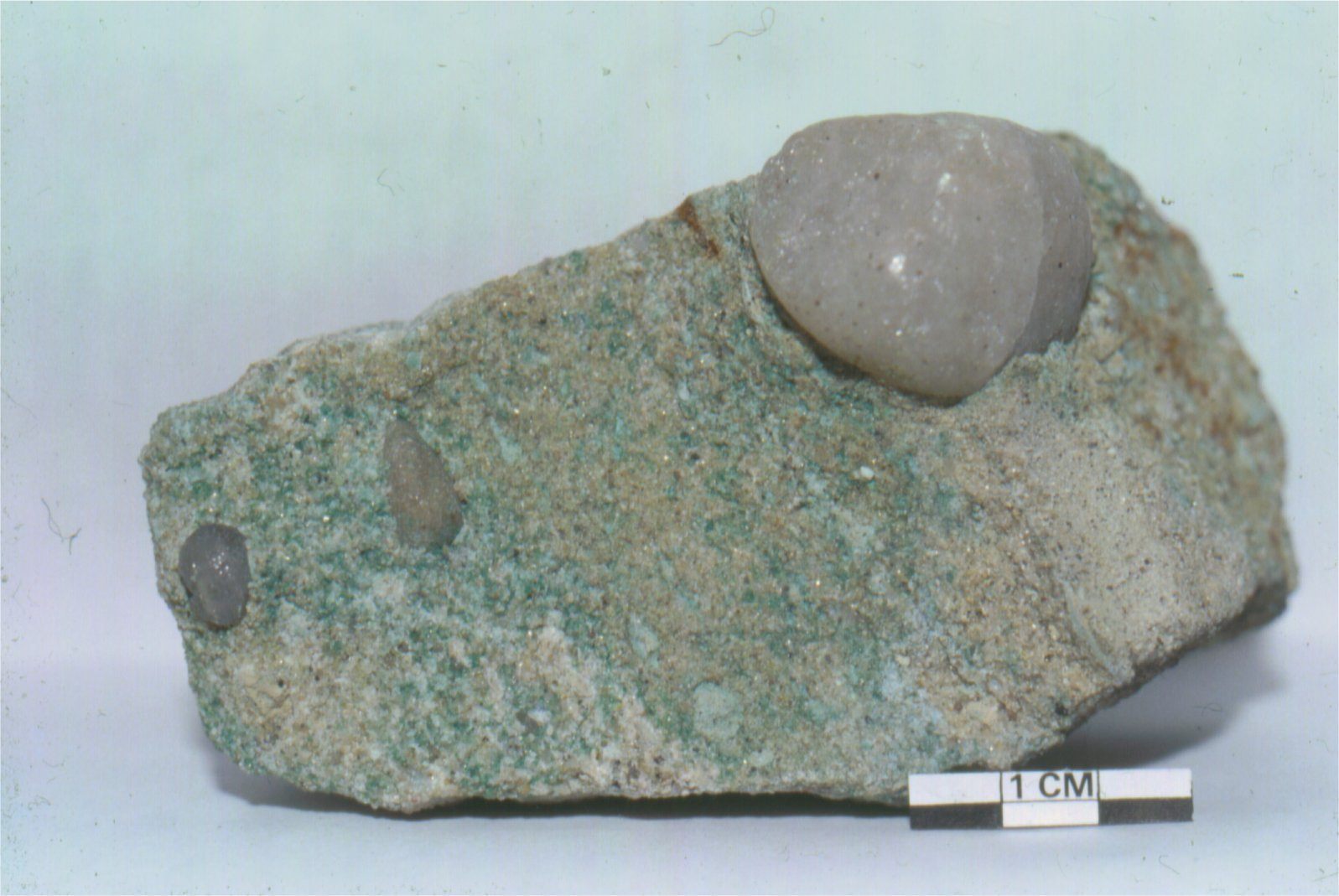
Sample of typical conglomerate showing pebbles of Variscan origin

The majority of the lower Triassic clastic sediments originated from a Variscan source area in northern France with minor local input. Some Alderley Edge conglomerates, consist of material originating from the Pennine block to the east. Breccias with clasts of local origin, are well developed on the edges of the basin and are interpreted as gravel fans at the mouths of wadis emerging from mountainous areas bordering the depositional basin. Others show long distance river transport by a powerful river system originating in the Armorican Massif. The basal conglomerates are made up of hard sandstone which contains angular grains. At Alderley Edge the junction is quite sharp it could be regarded as an unconformity. However interdigitation is found as if to testify against an unconformity. Mappable beds showing all the characteristics of the Upper Mottled Sandstone are found between the two basal beds of the conglomerates.

The conglomerate is typically a medium to fine grained brown to buff sandstone consisting of angular to sub angular grains with scattered flakes of mica; it makes a good building stone. Conglomerates occur in the basal part of the sequence and shale bands that are micaceous occur in the highest beds. Viewed regionally, the conglomerates appear to be impersistent. Near the southern end of the district where the ground is not covered by drift three conglomerates can be mapped. The bottom and most important is mostly pebbles – quartz and quartzites with occasional grits and rarely some igneous. These are set in a medium to coarse grained sand matrix. the pebbles can be up to 100 mm long.

The upper parts of the district is characterised by massive posts of medium to fine sandstone up to 6 m thick separated by chocolate coloured shales which are micaceous. The pots are well bedded and often quarried for building only occasionally are they false bedded.

The basal conglomerate is cut into sections by the faults and can be traced in a general eastwards direction from the village to the hill top 3 km away. It is about 20 m thick and broken into crags along the upper part of the edge. It dips west – southwest at an angle of 8° – 14°.

=== Marl ===
Generally the same sedimentary types are present in the marls as are in the waterstones but with less arenaceous and more argillaceous material. An irregular rhythm is discernible, each sedimentary cycle is well developed and have banded or stippled beds at the base. It is in this banded stratum that features such as sun cracks are found. Ripple marks are less common but they are evidence of deposition in shallow water. Pitting sometimes found has been linked to rain pitting but may have occurred during the de-gassing of the marls during drying out. The banded strata which may be red or grey pass up into blocky unstratified mudstones (broken up and allowed to resettle before consolidation).

== Post-Triassic folding ==
The major faults at Alderley are almost certainly of Tertiary age, their formation following closely a folding episode of the Cheshire Basin. The two major faults, both normal, are the Alderley and Kirkleyditch.

- Kirkley Ditch fault – The Keuper sandstone conglomerates dipping WSW at, and to the south of Kirkley Ditch, are clearly detached by a fault from the country to the west underlain by Upper Mottled Sandstone and from the main mass of Keuper conglomerate capping Alderley Edge. A break in gravity gradient near Kirkley Ditch [87307848] supports the inferred position of this fault. To the north and south its line must be conjectural and it is shown as having a roughly north-south trend.*
- Alderley Fault – The original map by Hull and Green showed a normal junction between the lower Keuper Sandstones of Alderley and the marl to the south west. A borehole driven in 1894 at Alderley Edge [NGR SK 84237819] proved Waterstones indicated the intervention of a fault between this position and the Keuper Sandstone to the east. North and south its line must be conjectural. The Edge Fault is visible on the north-east part of the escarpment where it separates the conglomerate on the north from the soft red mottled Upper Mottled Sandstone on the south.

== Resources ==
The red freestone of the Keuper building stone is familiar in buildings and bridges throughout North and West Cheshire. It is easily quarried and yields large free standing blocks and though soft at the time of quarrying, it has quality of hardening on exposure to the weather. The building stone represents a particular lithology of medium grained massive sandstones within the Keuper Sandstone and may not always lie at precisely the same horizon. It seems likely that the rock quarried in the northern part of the district is the lateral equivalent in part at any rate to the conglomerates of Alderley Edge which die out northwards. There are no working quarries of any importance today, but there are many old quarries around the area.

=== Sand and gravel ===
The widespread deposits of middle sands have been extensively worked around the Cheshire area for building purposes, they vary from clean sharp sand to somewhat loamy deposits with layers of clay. Whilst never quarried in any great quantity at Alderley, the Upper Mottled Sandstone in the main is incoherent enough to be quarried for sand and there are large reserves available at the foot of the Edge escarpment near the Hough.

The Red Sand (moulding sand) seen at Alderley Edge was used extensively for the purpose of constructing the moulds for the foundries in nearby Macclesfield during the late 19th and early 20th centuries.

=== Copper ore ===
Arthur Russell who did much of the early work on the Edge geology, mainly in relation to the mining activities said, "It is impossible to give even a rough estimate [of how much ore is available, it can] be said with certainty that the walls of the chambers and drives would yield some tens of thousands of tons of ore averaging 1.3% of copper. ... A more definite statement cannot be made since the ore is exposed on the sides of the workings only and has not been "blocked out", the system in the past having been to follow the richest ... impregnation while leaving the poorer rock standing". This statement is as true today as when written the distributions of the ore bodies and the fine dissemination makes accurate quantitative analysis difficult. The dissemination would on its own make the working of the ore economically unviable anyway. Further to the economics are the facts that most of the area is owned by the National Trust and it is designated by Government as a SSSI (Site of Special and Scientific Interest) for its geological value

=== Baryte ===
Baryte has varied usage and is a valuable mineral. Much of the sandstone at Alderley is barytic; there is presently no commercial potential as it would be too costly to extract the baryte from the sandstone.

== Fossils ==
The environment at the time was not conducive to life so few fossils are found. Occasional minute crustaceans of the genus Euestheria have been found in the marl lenses within the sandstone.

A few kilometres to the west and further over towards the Triassic outcrops of the Wirral, where conditions were drier, footprints and track ways of insects and small vertebrates, including Rhynchosaur and Chirotherium, have been identified.

== See also ==
- Alderley Edge Mines

== General references ==
- Aikin, J (1795). A Description of the Country from Thirty to Forty Miles around Manchester. Reprinted by David and Charles, Newton Abbott, 1968.
- Greenwood, H W. (1919). "The Trias of the Macclesfield District". Proceedings Liverpool Geological Society (12): 325–338.
- Macchi, L. (1990). "A Field Guide to the Continental Permo-Triassic Rocks of Cumbria and Northwest Cheshire". Liverpool Geological Society, Liverpool.
- Taylor, B; Price R; Trotter F (1963). "The geology of the Country around Stockport and Knutsford". Memoir of the Geological Survey GB: 20–22.
- Thompson, D. B. (1970). "The Area Around Manchester – Alderley Edge". Geologists Association Guide (7): 39–51.
- Warrington, G. (1980). "Alderley Edge Mining District". Amateur Geologist: 4–13.
