= Shrigley =

Shrigley may refer to:

Places

- Shrigley, County Down, Northern Ireland
- Pott Shrigley, a small village and civil parish in Cheshire, England
  - location of Shrigley Hall

People

- David Shrigley (born 1968), British artist
- Elsie Shrigley (1899–1978), English vegan activist
- Gordon Shrigley (born 1964), British architect
- Patricia Shrigley, British video artist

Other

- Shrigley abduction, an attempted forced marriage between an heiress and Edward Gibbon Wakefield
- Shrigley and Hunt, a manufacturer of stained glass windows
