= Robert Carr (rugby union) =

England international rugby union player & British Army officer

- Full name: Robert Stanley Leonard Carr
- Born: 11 July 1917 Backlow, England
- Died: 7 September 1979 (aged 62) Macclesfield, England
- School: Cranleigh School
- Notable relative: Leonard Haigh (uncle)

Rugby union career
- Position: Wing
International career
Years	Team	Apps	(Points)
1939	England	3	(0)

Lieutenant Robert Stanley Leonard Carr MC (11 July 1917 – 7 September 1979) was a British Army officer and England international rugby union player of the 1930s.

Hailing from Altrincham, Carr had rugby genes on both sides of his family. His maternal uncle, Leonard Haigh, was an England front-rower, while his father played for Manchester as a wing three-quarter.

Carr was educated at Cranleigh School, where he set multiple athletics records, for the 220-yards, quarter-mile and high-jump. A three-quarter, Carr gained captaincy honours with the England public schoolboys team.

During the late 1930s, Carr was a regular in the Manchester side and played occasionally for Old Cranleighans. He gained his England call up in 1939, playing on the wing in three Home Nations fixtures, before war intervened.

Carr served with the Manchester Regiment, attached to the King's African Rifles, in World War II. He was awarded a Military Cross for his actions during the Battle of Culqualber, when he volunteered to lead a group of four Askaris to capture several enemy positions, resulting in the surrender of 40 Italian soldiers.

== See also ==
- List of England national rugby union players
