= Adlington Hall =

Country house in Cheshire, England

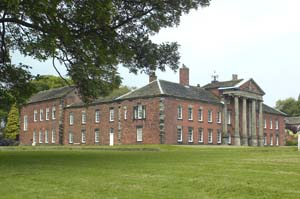
- Adlington Hall from the southwest

- Location in Cheshire
- 53.3209°N 2.1446°W
- Location: Adlington, Cheshire, England
- OS grid reference: SJ 905 805

History
- Built: 1480–1505
- Built for: Thomas Legh
- Rebuilt: 18th century 1928

Site notes
- Area: 160 acres (65 ha)
- Architect(s): Charles Legh (?) (18th century); Hubert Worthington (1928 reconstruction)

Listed Building – Grade I
- Designated: 25 July 1952
- Reference no.: 1234130

Adlington Hall is a country house near Adlington, Cheshire. The oldest part of the existing building, the Great Hall, was constructed between 1480 and 1505; the east wing was added in 1581. The Legh family has lived in the hall and in previous buildings on the same site since the early 14th century. After the house was occupied by Parliamentary forces during the Civil War, changes were made to the north wing, including encasing the Great Hall in brick, inserting windows, and installing an organ in the Great Hall. In the 18th century the house was inherited by Charles Legh who organised a series of major changes. These included building a new west wing, which incorporated a ballroom, and a south wing with a large portico. It is possible that Charles Legh himself was the architect for these additions. He also played a large part in planning and designing the gardens, woodland and parkland, which included a number of buildings of various types, including a bridge known as the Chinese Bridge that carried a summerhouse.

The hall was reconstructed and reduced in size in 1928. The work included demolition of much of the west wing, building a screen wall to fill the gap, and removing parts of the south wing. During the 19th and early 20th centuries the gardens, parkland and woodland became overgrown, and the condition of some of the buildings in them deteriorated. From the middle of the 20th century, work has been undertaken to restore some of the parkland and its buildings, and to create new formal gardens near the hall.

Adlington Hall is recorded in the National Heritage List for England as a designated Grade I listed building. The stable block has been converted for modern uses; part of it is listed at Grade II*, and the rest is at Grade II. The grounds contain eleven Grade II listed buildings, and the grounds themselves have been designated at Grade II* on the National Register of Historic Parks and Gardens. The hall is open to the public for visits and guided tours, and parts of the building can be hired for weddings and social functions.

== History ==
The first known building on the site was a Saxon hunting lodge for Earl Edwin. After the Norman conquest the estate was given to Hugh Lupus, and it remained in the possession of the Norman earls until 1221, when it passed to the Crown. Henry III granted the manor to Hugh de Corona. Hugh's son Thomas, who had no children, granted it to his sister Ellen, who married John de Legh of Booth in the early 14th century during the reign of Edward II, after which it became the ancestral home of the Leghs of Adlington. Originally the hall consisted of timber-framed buildings on three or four sides of a courtyard surrounded by a moat. The Great Hall, on the north side of the courtyard, was built between 1480 and 1505 for Thomas Legh I. The east wing and porch were added for Thomas Legh III in 1581. During the Civil War the hall was held by Colonel Thomas Legh for the Royalists but was taken twice, in 1642 and in 1644, by the Parliamentary forces. The hall was returned to the Leghs in 1656, and the north front was restored in 1660. Between 1665 and 1670 the north wing was rebuilt for Thomas Legh IV. Windows were inserted and along with the Great Hall, excluding the porch, it was encased in brick.

The estate was inherited in 1739 by Charles Legh, who embarked on a major programme of reconstruction, transforming the hall "from a medium-sized Tudor house into a large Georgian manor". He built a new west wing, which contained a dining room, a drawing room, a library, and a ballroom, the last occupying the whole length of the first floor. He then rebuilt the south wing, connecting it with the new west wing and the older Tudor east wing. At each end of the south wing was a pavilion with a canted bay on its south front. The west pavilion contained the southern end of the ballroom, and the east pavilion housed a chapel. During this time the stable block and other buildings were constructed in the grounds. The architect responsible for this work is unknown, although it has been suggested that the design was by Charles himself. A major reconstruction took place in 1928 under the direction of the architect Hubert Worthington. Much of the west wing was demolished, removing the ballroom but retaining the drawing and dining rooms. To avoid leaving a gap exposing the courtyard, Worthington filled it with a screen wall containing a corridor linking the west and south wings. He decorated this with quoins, cornices and sash windows. The projecting pavilions at the ends of the south front were also demolished. During the Second World War, parts of the Hall were used as a Services maternity ward run by St. Mary's Hospital. In the 1960s the stable block was converted into mews flats. Between 2004 and 2009 the east wing was restored.

== Architecture ==
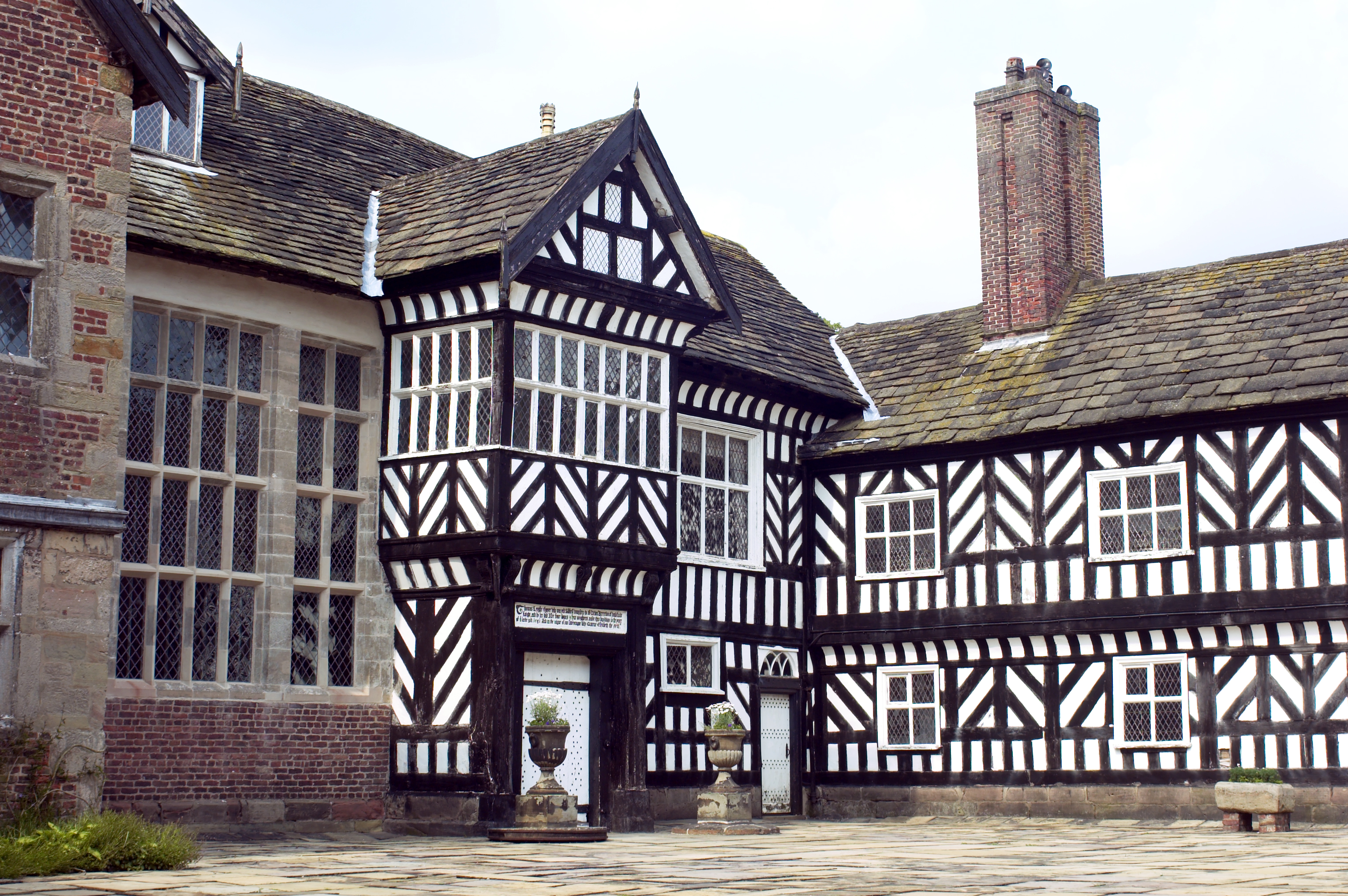
Northeast corner of the courtyard

=== Exterior ===
The plan of the hall consists of four ranges or wings arranged as a quadrangle around a courtyard, and comprises a mixture of architectural styles. The north and east wings are in 15th- and 16th-century black-and-white timber framing, and the south and west wings are in brick dating from the middle of the 18th century. The north front is in brick with stone quoins enclosing the timber-framing. It is irregular, in two or three storeys with six gables. It contains a mixture of 12- and 16-pane sash windows, and two Venetian windows. On the courtyard side is a two-storey timber-framed porch bearing a long inscription dated 1581. The east wing is timber-framed, with close studding, on a rubble stone plinth. It contains mullioned and transomed windows, a small oriel window, and 12- and 16-pane sash windows. There is also a two-storey staircase turret. The south wing is in Flemish bond brick with sandstone dressings. It is symmetrical, in two and three storeys, and 13 bays. It is set on a low stone plinth, and has rusticated quoins. In the centre is a portico rising to the full height of the building. This consists of four plain Ionic columns each of which is carried on an octagonal pedestal. It has a frieze bearing the inscription "CHARLES & HESTER LEGH 1757", and its pediment contains the Legh arms. Behind the portico are two round-arched windows and a round-arched door on the ground floor, over which is a window with a Palladian pediment. On each side of the portico are 12-pane sash windows under flat rusticated heads. Only the left and right ends of the west wing are still present, and they are joined by a screen wall. Inside the courtyard, on the south and west sides, is a cloister.

=== Interior ===
The major part of the north wing is occupied by the medieval Great Hall. This has a hammer-beam roof, with carvings of angels that were added at a later date. The roof is plastered, but has been painted in such a way that it appears to be panelled. At the end that would have originally been occupied by the high table is "the finest canopy in the county", according to the authors of the Buildings of England series. This is "a rare wooden version of the cloths of estate hung over the high table in the Middle Ages to give splendour to the appearance of the Lord of the manor". It consists of five tiers of panels, divided by oak ribs into 60 compartments, each of which is painted with the arms of Cheshire families. At the intersections of the ribs, instead of bosses, there are carved letters spelling out an inscription including the date 1505. At one time the scheme may have been greater, as an account dated 1611 records a display of over 180 coats of arms. Under the canopy is a mural of Hector and Andromache. The side walls contain murals depicting the history of Troy. The latter had been painted over until they were revealed in 1859, when the family were playing with a shuttlecock and damaged the overlying plaster. The other end of the hall is supported by a spere^{[A]} truss formed by two giant oak trunks, carved into an octagonal shape and covered in panels. Within the spere truss is an organ (see below). To the sides of the organ are murals depicting, on one side Arabella Hunt, and on the other Saint Cecilia playing a harp. Below the murals were the doors to the buttery and pantry. Both doors are now blocked, replaced by panels carved with animals and foliage. Also in the Great Hall is a fireplace decorated with the head of Apollo.

In the west wing are the surviving rooms from Charles Legh's extension, the dining room on the ground floor and the drawing room above it. Both rooms are panelled and decorated in Classical style, with pediments over the doors and chimneypieces. The dining room is the simpler of the two, and contains a white marble fireplace that has been dated to 1742. The fireplace in the drawing room is also in white marble but is more elaborate, carved with scrolls, garlands, and a profile of Minerva. This room also contains giant Corinthian pilasters. Above its doors are wood-carvings in the style of William Kent, depicting the heads of Bacchus, Ceres, Flora, and Neptune. The rooms in the south wing include family sitting rooms decorated with Rococo style ceilings, and Gothic and Chinoiserie motifs. Also in the rooms of this wing are items moved from the demolished parts of the west wing. The east wing contains service rooms.

== Organ ==
The organ was installed in the Great Hall in the late 17th century. There is some dispute in respect of the precise date of installation and the builder. It was probably built in about 1670, and has been attributed to Bernard "Father" Smith, but "no conclusive evidence has come to light either to substantiate or to dismiss this theory". It has two manuals, no pedals, and fourteen speaking stops. It includes three 17th-century reed stops, which is a rarity for the time. The organ was "remade" in about 1680 by Christian Smith, and rebuilt in 1741–42 by Glyn and Parker. In 1958–59 it was restored by Noel Mander, at which time it had been derelict for a century or more. The organ has a "very fine Renaissance case", in two tiers. In the lower tier are the two manual keyboards over which is a row of pipes. The upper tier consists of five panels containing pipes, which are flanked by Corinthian pilasters. Over the top is a large curved hood containing gilded statues of putti playing trumpets, and a coat of arms celebrating the marriage of John Legh to Isabella Robartes in 1693. The hall's website states it is "without doubt England's most important surviving instrument from the late 17th century". It has been awarded a Historic Organ Certificate. The organ was filmed and recorded for the documentary The Elusive English Organ.

The composer Handel was a friend of the Legh family and played the organ in 1741 or 1742. He also composed the music for a hunting song, the words of which had been written by Charles Legh. There is a tradition that Handel composed The Harmonious Blacksmith at the hall, but it is not possible to confirm this.

== Grounds ==
The hall is surrounded by a landscape park and woodland, covering in total about 160 acres (65 ha). In addition to the buildings in the grounds, Charles Legh played a large part in designing the layout of the gardens in the 18th century. Over the years parts of the grounds have become overgrown, and the condition of the buildings has deteriorated. Since the 1950s work has been carried out to improve the grounds, and to develop parts of the gardens in a more modern style. To the north of the house a rose garden has been created and, beyond that a yew maze.

To the southeast of the hall is the stable block which partly surrounds a courtyard. It has a south front of nine bays, the middle three of which project forwards and have a pediment carried on four large Doric pilasters. The block originally had a cupola, but this has been removed. A formal garden has been built between the east wing and the stable block. Standing in this garden is a lead statue of a reclining, naked male figure, said to be Father Tiber, the river god. This formerly stood in the wilderness garden. On the wall behind the statue are two carved unicorn heads, the emblem of the Legh family. These formerly stood on pillars at the eastern entrance to the grounds. The statues have been designated as a Grade II listed building. A Grade II building is one that is "nationally important and of special interest". To the south of the formal garden is a stone statue of Napoleon carved by George Turner and dated 1837. To the west of the hall is a ha-ha in rubble sandstone dating from the 18th century. It was built to act as a barrier between the west side of the garden and the deer park beyond it, and is listed Grade II. Immediately to the south of the hall is a circular lawn, in the centre of which is a sundial that probably dates from about 1825. Constructed in ashlar buff sandstone and standing on a pair of circular steps, it consists of an octagonal base with a partly fluted baluster supporting an octagonal moulded capstone. The capstone carries a copper plate inscribed with Roman numerals and the initials "TL", and has a simple triangular gnomon. The sundial is also listed Grade II.

Leading south from the lawn is a walk known as the Lime Avenue, which is entered through gates dated 1688. The gates are in wrought iron and the piers in ashlar buff gritstone; these are again listed Grade II. The avenue leads to another Grade II listed building, a structure known as the Shell House, so-called because its interior is decorated with shells and coloured mirrors. It is a single-storey cottage constructed in red brick with buff sandstone dressings. The roof is in stone-slate and the chimney is brick. The wall is in brick with a stone coping. In front of Shell Cottage another sundial, also listed Grade II. This was probably built in the early 18th century for John Legh, and moved to its present position in the middle of that century. It is thought that the pillar on which it stands was originally a Saxon cross base. The octagonal copper plate is inscribed with Roman numerals, the longitude of Adlington, and John Legh's initials. To the front of the Shell House is another walk, known as the Yew Walk. At the back and side of the house is a rockery.

To the south and west of the Shell House is a wooded area known as the Wilderness, through which runs the River Dean (or Dene). Many of the winding paths created by Charles Legh in the Wilderness are now overgrown, and some of the buildings are in a poor condition, or have collapsed into ruin. One building still in good condition is the Tig House, a small square pavilion overlooking the river, an early example of a building in the Chinoiserie style. It is constructed in red brick and partly clad in black and white timber framing. It has a stone-slate pyramidal roof with a wooden finial, and is listed Grade II. Near to this is a bridge known as the Chinese Bridge crossing the river, but the summerhouse which once stood on the bridge is no longer present. Another structure in the Wilderness is the Temple of Diana. This is a circular temple with a dome constructed in ashlar buff sandstone. It stands on a stylobate which supports six Doric columns and an entablature. The structure is listed Grade II. This appears to be in good condition, but in the early 2000s was said to be suffering from damp. Other buildings known as the Rathouse and the Hermitage, have been damaged by falling trees. At the north entrance to the grounds is a pair of gate piers that are listed Grade II. The piers are in rusticated ashlar sandstone and are surmounted by ball finials. The gates are iron and are similar to those at the end of the lime avenue. At the other end of the grounds, at the site of the former south approach, is a pair of sandstone gate piers dating from the middle of the 18th century. They originally carried the carved unicorn heads that are now in the formal garden, and were left isolated when the route of the turnpike road was moved. They are listed Grade II.

== Present day ==
Adlington Hall stands in open countryside to the west of the village of Adlington, Cheshire, England. It was designated a Grade I listed building on 25 July 1952. Grade I listing means that the building is acknowledged to be "of exceptional interest, sometimes considered to be internationally important". The hall was privately owned by the Leigh family, who lived in the hall, and was sold in 2023 with 1,921 acres, the guide price having been £30 million. It is open to the public and for guided tours for groups at advertised times.

The Great Hall and the Hunting Lodge are available to be hired for weddings and social functions. The south wing of the stable block has been converted into eight flats and is known as The Mews. It has been designated as a Grade II* listed building. Grade II* listing applies to "particularly important buildings of more than special interest". The east wing is listed Grade II and has been converted into two flats and tea rooms. The landscape park has been registered at Grade II* in the National Register of Historic Parks and Gardens. Designation as Grade II* on the Register means that the site is "particularly important, of more than special interest".

In 1984 the Hall was used as the location for Stoke Moran, home of Dr Grimesby Roylott, for the episode "The Speckled Band" (1984) of the Granada TV series Sherlock Holmes. In 1986 it was used again in the series for the "Abbey Grange" episode.

== See also ==
- Grade I listed buildings in Cheshire
- Listed buildings in Adlington, Cheshire

== Notes ==
^{A} A spere is a fixed structure at the lower end of a great hall, screening it from the screens passage behind it.
