= Listed buildings in Bollington =

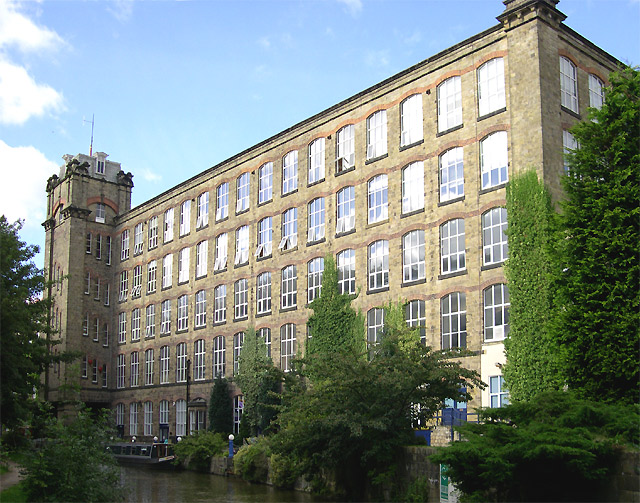
Clarence Mill, a former cotton mill

Bollington is a civil parish in Cheshire East, England. It contains 66 listed buildings that are recorded in the National Heritage List for England, all of which are at Grade II. This grade is the lowest of the three gradings given to listed buildings and is applied to "buildings of national importance and special interest". In the parish is the town of Bollington, which is surrounded by countryside leading up to the foothills of the Pennines on the east. To the south of the town is the long Kerridge Hill, which has been a source of industry, with coal mining on its east side and quarrying on the west side. These quarries are the source of Kerridge stone-slate, which is used to roof many of the houses in the locality.

The parish was rural before the arrival of industry, and the oldest listed buildings are houses or cottages, and farms with related structures, which date back as far as the 16th century. There is one surviving listed structure related to coal mining, a chimney. In the 18th and 19th centuries, the major industry in the town was cotton spinning, and in 1830 the Macclesfield Canal was built, passing through the town on a large embankment. There are nine listed structures relating to the canal, namely three bridges, three milestones, a distance stone, two aqueducts, and a dock complex. The mills are no longer processing cotton, but three surviving mills that have been converted into other uses are listed: Clarence Mill, Adelphi Mill and Lowerhouse Mill. The mills brought wealth to their owners, and this is reflected in their building large houses with associated structures, some of which are listed. The other listed buildings are the sort of buildings to be found in any town, such as public houses and churches.

Name and location	Photograph	Date	Notes
Bollington Hall Farmhouse; 53.29519°N 2.10977°W	—	16th century	The former farmhouse has a timber-framed core. It was altered in the 17th and again in the 20th century. Its exterior is in sandstone, and has a roof in Kerridge stone-slate with a stone ridge. The house has an L-shaped plan, is in two storeys, and has a three-bay front. The right gable end contains a massive stone chimney. The windows are casements.
Cold Arbour Farmhouse; 53.28329°N 2.11991°W	—	16th century	Additions were made in the 17th century, and alterations in the 18th century, converting it into a house. It is built in sandstone, and has a roof in Kerridge stone-slate with a stone ridge. The house has an L-shaped plan, is in two storeys, and has a three-bay north front. The windows are casements. Inside the house is exposed timber-framing.
Barn, Cold Arbour Farm; 53.28330°N 2.11985°W	—	16th century	Additions were made to the barn in the 17th century, and there were alterations in the 19th and 20th centuries. It is built in sandstone, and has a roof in Kerridge stone-slate with a stone ridge. Before the additions, the building has a rectangular four-bay plan. Its features include a cart opening, windows, square pitch holes, and ventilation slots.
9 Moss Brow; 53.29241°N 2.11790°W	—	Early 17th century	The house originated as a farmhouse, and was altered in the 20th century. It is built in sandstone, has stone-coped gables, and a roof in Kerridge stone-slate with a stone ridge. On one of the gables is a ball finial. The house has a rectangular plan, and is at right-angles to the road. It is in two storeys, and has casement windows. Inside is exposed timber-framing.
Barley Grange; 53.29167°N 2.12024°W	—	Early 17th century	This has a timber-framed core. It was originally a farmhouse and a farm building, with later alterations and additions. It is built in sandstone, and has a roof in Kerridge stone-slate with a stone ridge. The house has a rectangular plan, is in 2½ storeys, and has a six-bay front. Some windows are mullioned, other are sashes or casements. To the left of the house are a 19th-century stable and a former steam-driven electric generator house.
Hollin Old Hall; 53.29447°N 2.09963°W	—	Early 17th century	This was built as a hall, then used as a farmhouse, and subsequently converted for use as a house. It was expanded in the middle of the 18th century, and further extended and remodelled in about 1870. It is constructed in sandstone, and has a roof in Kerridge stone-slate with a stone ridge. The house is in two storeys with cellars, and has a three-bay front. On the front are two gables, and the house is mainly in Jacobean style. The windows are mullioned or mullioned and transomed. Inside the house is a large inglenook fireplace.
Orchard House; 53.29202°N 2.11827°W	—	Early 17th century	Orchard House originated as a farmhouse. It is built in sandstone and has a Welsh slate roof. The house is in 2½ storeys, and has a three-bay front. The outer bays contain two-storey caned bay windows. Above these are half-dormers with coped gables and ball finials. Over the central doorway is a two-light window. The windows are mullioned.
Briar Cottage; 53.28501°N 2.12088°W		1630	This was initially two cottages, later converted into one house. It is built in sandstone, and has a roof in Kerridge stone-slate with a stone ridge. The house is in two storeys, and has a three-bay front, the two right bays projecting slightly forward. The windows are mullioned.
58 Grimshaw Lane; 53.29350°N 2.10185°W	—	17th century	Originating as a farmhouse, alterations and additions were made in the 19th, converting it into a house. It is built in sandstone, and has a roof in Kerridge stone-slate with a stone ridge. The house is in two storeys, and has a two-bay front. The windows are casements.
Corner Shop; 53.29197°N 2.11796°W	—	17th century	This was originally a house, later converted into a house and a shop. Alterations wee carried out in the mid-19th century. The building is constructed in sandstone, and has a roof in Kerridge stone-slate with a stone ridge. It is in two storeys, and has a three-bay front. The outer bays have gabled half-dormers. The windows are casements, and the door is on the left side.
Heywood's; 53.29175°N 2.11762°W	—	17th century	This originated as a farmhouse and a barn. The barn was built in the 18th century, and both parts were altered in the 19th century, forming two adjoining houses. They are constructed in sandstone, and have a roof in Kerridge stone-slate with a stone ridge. The houses are in two storeys, and each has a three-bay front. The windows are casements, and both houses have gabled half-dormers. There is evidence of timber-framing in the interior walls of the former farmhouse.
Lowerhouse Mill Cottage and The Mews; 53.29565°N 2.11647°W	—	17th century	Originally a farmhouse and a barn, the building has been converted into two houses. They are constructed in sandstone, and have a roof in Kerridge stone-slate with a stone ridge. On the south front are two gabled half-dormers and a three-light window. There is internal evidence that the building has a timber-framed core.
11 Moss Brow; 53.29245°N 2.11790°W	—	Late 17th century	The building originated as part of a farmhouse, and was altered in the 19th and 20th centuries. It is constructed in sandstone with roofs of Kerridge stone-slate. The house is in two storeys, and has two gables on the front. In the ground floor are bow windows, and above are three-light casement windows. At the rear are two two-light mullioned windows.
Turner Heath; 53.28816°N 2.12056°W	—	Early 18th century	The house was rebuilt in about 1780. It is constructed in brick, and has a Kerridge stone-slate roof with a stone ridge. The rear wall is in sandstone. The house is in three storeys, and has a three-bay front. At the top of the building is a fluted frieze under a projecting cornice. The doorway is flanked by ionic columns, and the windows are sashes.
16–22 Queen Street; 53.29870°N 2.09596°W	—	18th century	A curving row of four cottages that were altered in the 20th century, two of which project forward. They are constructed in sandstone with roofs of Kerridge stone-slate. The windows are casements.
Moss Cottage; 53.29276°N 2.11834°W	—	18th century	The building was originally a barn or stables, and was later converted into a house. It is built in sandstone, and has a Kerridge stone-slate roof with a stone ridge. The house has a long rectangular plan, is in two storeys, and has a three-bay front. The central bay projects slightly forward under a plain pediment with a circular window. The other windows are casements.
Parish boundary stone 53.31279°N 2.09575°W	—	18th century	The stone stands on the boundary of the parishes of Bollington and Pott Shrigley. It is a rectangular sandstone block, carved with the letters "B" (for Bollington) and "S" (for Pott Shrigley).
Parish boundary stone 53.31263°N 2.09594°W	—	18th century	The stone stands on the boundary of the parishes of Bollington and Pott Shrigley. It is a rectangular sandstone block with a shaped curved top. The stone is carved with the letters "B" (for Bollington) and "S" (for Pott Shrigley), and an Ordnance Survey benchmark.
Parish boundary stone 53.30350°N 2.08673°W	—	18th century	The stone stands on the boundary of the parishes of Bollington and Pott Shrigley. It is a rectangular sandstone block with a shaped curved top, is half-buried, and is carved with the letters "B" (for Bollington) and "S" (for Pott Shrigley).
Cock and Pheasant Inn; 53.29133°N 2.12123°W		1753	The public house originated as a house, and was altered in the 19th century. It is built in brick, and has a Kerridge stone-slate roof with a stone ridge. The public house has a double-pile plan, is in two storeys, and has a three-bay front. In the centre is a gabled porch. The windows are sashes.
38 Oak Lane; 53.28829°N 2.09786°W	—	Late 18th century	Originally two houses, this has been converted into a single dwelling. It is built in sandstone with a Kerridge stone-slate roof. The house is in two storeys, and has a five-bay front. There are doorways in the second and fourth bays. The windows are mullioned, and there is a later dormer.
Kiln; 53.28126°N 2.09159°W		Late 18th century (probable)	The kiln was used in the manufacture of potash or lime. It is built in sandstone, and is bottle-shaped. There is a rectangular hole leading into it in the roadside wall, and the kiln is set into the hillside.
50 and 52 Bollington Road; 53.29098°N 2.12111°W	—	Late 18th to early 19th century	A pair of cottages built in sandstone with a Kerridge stone-slate roof. They are in two storeys, and have a symmetrical five-bay front. The windows are casements. In the centre are three doorways, the central one giving access to the rear of the cottages.
Parish boundary stone 53.31215°N 2.09376°W	—	18th–19th century	The boundary stone consists of a square stone pillar carved with the letter "S" (for Shrigley).
Parish boundary stone 53.30772°N 2.08810°W	—	18th–19th century	The boundary stone consists of a square flat-topped stone pillar with an irregular base. It is carved with the letter "S" (for Shrigley).
Parish boundary stone 53.30782°N 2.08774°W	—	18th–19th century	The boundary stone consists of a square flat-topped stone pillar with an irregular base. It is carved with the letters "B" (for Bollington) and "S" (for Shrigley).
Parish Boundary Stone; 53.29359°N 2.09151°W	—	18th–19th century	The stone marks the boundaries of three parishes, and is in sandstone. The lower part, which is buried in the ground has vertical sides, and the upper part is slightly sloping with a semicircular head. The stone is inscribed with "B" (for Bollington), "K" (for Kerridge), and "R" (for Rainow).
Lowerhouse Mill; 53.29603°N 2.11805°W	—	1811	Originally a cotton mill, this was later used as a paperworks. It was built for George Antrobus, and taken over in 1832 by Samuel Greg, who extended it. The original part of the mill is built in sandstone, with an asbestos roof. It is in four storeys, and has a symmetrical 23-bay east front. In the centre of this is a projecting staircase tower with two clock faces. To the right of the main block is a two-storey, former water turbine house, and to the left is a two-storey, four-bay engine house.
Heath House; 53.28822°N 2.12058°W	—	c. 1820	The house was originally an addition to the adjacent house, and was later extended. It is built in brick, and has a Kerridge stone-slate roof with a stone ridge. The house has an L-shaped plan, is in two storeys, and has a three-bay front. The left bay contains a curved two-storey bay window. The central bay has a semicircular doorcase with a fanlight, and the right bay projects forward by two bays. At the rear of the house is a two-storey bay window. The windows are sashes. Inside the house is a fireplace moved from Eaton Hall, Cheshire, when it was demolished.
Stables and coach house, 101 Bollington Road; 53.28849°N 2.12063°W	—	c. 1820	The stables and coach house are built in brick, and have a Kerridge stone-slate roof with a stone ridge. They form an L-shaped plan. The building contains semicircular-headed windows, a coach entrance with a segmental arch, and a round pitch hole.
1, 1A, 3, 5, and 5A Beeston Brow; 53.29862°N 2.09781°W	—	Early 19th century	The building originated as three houses with weaving lofts, later converted into a row of five houses. They are constructed in sandstone, and have a Kerridge stone-slate roof with a stone ridge. The building has a rectangular plan, is in three storeys, and has a six-bay front. The windows are casements.
Boundary stone 53.29777°N 2.08756°W	—	Early 19th century	The boundary stone consists of a sandstone block with a semicircular head at the base of a drystone wall. It is carved with the letter "B", which is now worn.
Chimney; 53.29983°N 2.09483°W	—	Early 19th century	The mill chimney is constructed in sandstone. It is octagonal with a castellated balcony on a moulded cornice. A flue leads down from the chimney to the former Oak Bank Mill.
Parish boundary stone 53.29782°N 2.11716°W	—	Early 19th century	The boundary stone consists of a square sandstone pillar with an irregular base and a domed top. It is carved with the letter "B" for Bollington.
Parish boundary stone 53.29790°N 2.11707°W	—	Early 19th century	The boundary stone consists of a square sandstone pillar with an irregular base and a domed top. It is carved with the letter "B" for Bollington.
Parish boundary stone 53.29851°N 2.08812°W	—	Early 19th century	The stone stands on the boundary of the parishes of Bollington and Rainow. It is a block of sandstone with a semicircular head, carved with the letters "B" (for Bollington) and "R" (for Rainow).
Estate boundary stone 53.28838°N 2.09127°W		1830	The stone marks the boundary of an estate. It is an ashlar sandstone block set into a dry stone wall. It is carved with the letters "T" and "G".
10 and 12 Bollington Road; 53.29181°N 2.11801°W	—	c. 1830	This consists of a house and an attached business property. The house is in brick with sandstone dressings and a Welsh slate roof. It is in two storeys and has a three-bay front. In the first bay is a round-headed doorcase and a fanlight. The business property to the left is lower and stuccoed, and is also in two storeys with a three bay front. Other than one 20th-century window, all the windows are sashes. The railings along the front of the buildings are included in the listing.
Grimshaw Lane Aqueduct; 53.29303°N 2.10659°W		c. 1830	The aqueduct carries the Macclesfield Canal over Grimshaw Lane. It was designed by William Crosley, and is constructed in sandstone. The aqueduct is barrel vaulted with horseshoe-shaped arches at each end. Above the west arch is parapet and a single-storey building with four openings and an entrance from the towpath.
Palmerston Street Aqueduct; 53.29806°N 2.10065°W		c. 1830	The aqueduct carries the Macclesfield Canal over Palmerston Street. It was designed by William Crosley, and is constructed in sandstone. The aqueduct is barrel vaulted with horseshoe-shaped arches at each end. There are curving wing walls ending in square pilasters.
Canal bridge number 27; 53.29745°N 2.10162°W		c. 1830	The bridge carries Hurst Lane over the Macclesfield Canal. It was designed by William Crosley, and is constructed in sandstone. The bridge consists of single elliptical horseshoe arch, and has a plain parapet with round coping. It ends in square pilasters with capstones.
Canal bridge number 28; 53.29008°N 2.10590°W		c. 1830	The bridge crossing the Macclesfield Canal was designed by William Crosley. It is constructed in sandstone. The bridge consists of single elliptical horseshoe arch, and has a plain parapet with stone coping. It ends in square pilasters, and has a flight of steps leading up from the towpath.
Canal bridge number 29; 53.28488°N 2.10847°W		c. 1830	This is a roving bridge that carries the towpath and Clarke Lane over the Macclesfield Canal. It was designed by William Crosley, and is constructed in sandstone. It consists of a single horseshoe arch, has a plain parapet, and ends in square pilasters.
Canal docks 53.28787°N 2.10457°W		c. 1830	These consist of a wet dock and a dry dock built to serve a tramway from the Endon quarry to the Macclesfield Canal. The docks are built in sandstone, and each has a rectangular plan. The sides of the dry dock are canted down to a drain. The dock narrows at the west end towards the sluice dividing the docks.
Canal milestone 53.28359°N 2.11079°W		c. 1830	The milestone stands by the Macclesfield Canal. It is in sandstone and is inscribed with the distances in miles to Hall Green and Marple.
Canal milestone 53.29596°N 2.10497°W		c. 1830	The milestone stands by the Macclesfield Canal. It is in millstone grit and is inscribed with the distances in miles to Hall Green and Marple. The milestone is approximately midway between the Grimshaw Lane aqueduct and bridge number 27.
Distance stone 53.29854°N 2.10056°W		c. 1830	The distance stone stands by the towpath of the Macclesfield Canal. It is a rectangular slab of sandstone inscribed with "1/2" on the south face and (possibly) "1/4" on the north face.
Limefield House; 53.30016°N 2.09714°W	—	c. 1830	The Georgian-style house is built in sandstone, with a pyramidal Welsh slate roof surmounted by a central chimney. It has a square plan with a rear extension, is in two storeys, and has a symmetrical three-bay south front. There is a Tuscan porch and a fanlight. At the corners of the house are clasping square pilasters, and the windows are sashes.
Stables and coach house, Limefield House; 53.30016°N 2.09714°W	—	c. 1830	The stables and coach house are built in sandstone, with a Welsh slate roof. They have an L-shaped plan, are in two storeys, and have an eight-bay west front. The surrounds of the openings are rusticated. There are two coach house entrances in the west front, and on the west and south fronts are semicircular-headed openings in the lower storey, and circular openings in the upper storey.
St John the Baptist's Church; 53.2970°N 2.0930°W		1832–84	This was a commissioners' Church designed by William Hayley and Thomas Brown. It is built in sandstone with a Welsh slate roof. The church consists of a nave, a chancel, a vestry and a west tower. The body of the church and the tower are embattled. The church was declared redundant in 2006.
Clarence Mill; 53.3003°N 2.1002°W		1834	The cotton mill was built for the Swindells family, and was extended in 1841, 1854 and 1877. It is constructed in sandstone with a slate roof, and has a tall brick chimney. It is in five storeys, and extends for 51 bays along the Macclesfield Canal. To the left is a projecting six-stage water tower with a hipped Mansard roof, and to the right is a single-storey two-bay engine house.
Stables and coach house, Endon Hall; 53.28545°N 2.09804°W	—	c. 1835	The stables and coach house are built in sandstone, and have Kerridge stone-slate roofs with a stone ridge. They form a courtyard plan, are in two storeys, and have a symmetrical five-bay front. In the centre of this is a coach entrance with a two-tier dovecote and clock above. Also on the roof is an open wooden bellcote with a copper dome and a weathervane. The parapet is castellated. On the courtyard front are cart openings and circular pitch holes.
39A Palmerston Street; 53.29815°N 2.09478°W	—	c. 1840	This was originally a house, later converted into a shop and an office. It is built in sandstone and has a hipped Welsh slate roof. The building is in two storeys, and has a symmetrical three-bay front. There is a central doorway with a semicircular head and a fanlight. The windows are sashes.
Ice House, Endon Hall; 53.28508°N 2.09791°W	—	c. 1840	The ice house is constructed in sandstone. It is entered by a flight of steps, and consists of a low segmental vault with two large troughs.
Turret Cottages; 53.28487°N 2.09362°W	—	c. 1840	This building originally consisted of two cottages and a smithy, which were later converted into a row of three cottages. They are built in sandstone and have a Kerridge stone-slate roof. They form a rectangular plan, are in two storeys and have a front of four bays. The windows are casements. Running along the front of the building is an embattled parapet.
Carterbench House; 53.2997°N 2.0994°W	—	1843	This was built as Rock Bank House for a mill owner, and has since had various uses. It is in Tudor style, and is constructed in sandstone with a Welsh slate roof. The house has a T-shaped plan, is in 2½ storeys, and has a four-bay south front. The first and second bays project forward under gables with mullioned and transomed windows, and there is a casement window above. In the second bay is a large projecting porch, and a doorcase with a four-centred arch.
Lord Clyde Inn; 53.28507°N 2.11584°W		1843	Originating as two weavers' cottages, this has been converted into a public house. It has a front in sandstone, with the rest of the building in brick. The roof is in Kerridge stone-slate, with a stone ridge. The building is in three storeys, with symmetrical four-bay fronts. On the entrance front are two central entrances, one of which is blocked, and two bow windows. The middle storey contains sash windows, and in the top storey are weaving left casement windows. There are also weaving left windows at the rear, these being horizontal sliding sashes.
Chimney; 53.28612°N 2.09395°W		Mid-19th century	The chimney was built to provide ventilation for a coal mine. It is constructed in sandstone, and consists of an octagonal base, with a circular chimney that contains four false loopholes. At the top is a projecting cornice and a castellated parapet.
2–14 High Street, 1–5 Mill Cottages and workshop 53.29756°N 2.09579°W	—	c. 1850	This is a group of buildings forming a complete yard layout. They are constructed in sandstone with Kerridge stone-slate and Welsh slate roofs. The west range, facing High Street, consists of a warehouse, two shops, and a cottage. The south range is formed by a terrace of five two-storey cottages, and a workshop complex.
Endon Lodge; 53.28361°N 2.10286°W		c. 1850	This was the lodge to Endon Hall that was extended in the 20th century and used as a house. It is built in sandstone and has a pyramidal Welsh slate roof with a red tile ridge. The house has a hexagonal plan, is in two storeys, and has a castellated parapet. The windows are casements.
Adelphi Mill; 53.2920°N 2.1069°W		1856	The former cotton mill was built for the Swindells family, and was extended in 1875. It is constructed in sandstone with a multi-valley slate roof. The building is in six storeys, and has a west front of 30 bays. At the northeast corner is a square tower with octagonal turrets on the corners. To the north of the building is the square base of a chimney that has been demolished. Also to the north are more buildings, including an engine house, a boiler house, a cotton store, and a smithy.
The Owlhurst; 53.29740°N 2.09184°W	—	c. 1865	This originated as a flour mill, and was used later as a joinery workshop. It is built in sandstone, and has a Kerridge stone-slate roof. The building is in three storeys, and has a three-bay front. In the centre is a cart entrance with an elliptical head. The windows are sashes.
Hollin Hall Hotel; 53.2919°N 2.1004°W		c. 1870	Originally Hollin Hall, the building has been converted into a hotel. It is constructed in sandstone with Welsh slate roofs, and is in a mixture of Tudor and Jacobean styles. The hotel is in two storeys, and has a four-bay entrance front. The left bay consists of a four-stage octagonal castellated tower, and the right bay has two-storey canted bay windows. The third bay projects forward, and contains a doorway, a canted castellated oriel window, and a shaped gabled.
Methodist Church; 53.29773°N 2.10521°W		1886	The church was designed by William Waddington in the style of the 13th century. It is constructed in sandstone, and has a Welsh slate roof with a red tile ridge. It consists of a five-bay nave, and has a northwest tower with a broach spire.
Vicarage; 53.29978°N 2.08856°W	—	1898	The vicarage was designed by Ernest Newton, and contains some Tudor features. It is built in sandstone with a Kerridge stone-slate roof. The vicarage has a rectangular plan, and is in two storeys with an attic. The windows are mullioned or mullioned and transomed.
St Oswald's Church; 53.29201°N 2.11903°W		1907–08	The church was designed by F. P. Oakley in Decorated style. It is built in sandstone and has a red tiled roof. It is orientated north–south, and consists of a nave, an east aisle, a chancel, and two porches. The nave has a hammerbeam roof, and the chancel has a wagon roof.
Kerridge war memorial 53.28679°N 2.10015°W	—	1919	The war memorial stands in a memorial garden and is in Kerridge sandstone. It consists of a cross with a tapering shaft standing on a stepped tapering plinth on three steps. The plinth has a chamfered step and corners, and on each face is an inscribed panel, which include the names of those lost in both World Wars.
Bollington war memorial 53.29796°N 2.09933°W	—	1920	The war memorial stands in a memorial garden and is in red and buff sandstone. It consists of a cross with a wheel head. On the shaft is Celtic tracery, on the cross arms are carvings of patron saints, and on the top is a tiled roof. The cross stands on a chamfered plinth that is carved on the front with an inscription and a laurel wreath. Elsewhere on the plinth are the names of those who died in the two world wars. The plinth stands on five steps.
Holly Bush public house 53.29825°N 2.09722°W		c. 1935	A public house rebuilt to replace a smaller one on the site. It is in Tudor Revival style, and has two storeys. The lower storey is in brick with stone dressings, and the upper storey has applied timber-work with rendered panels; the roof is slated. The front has three bays with a central Tudor arched doorway. At the rear is an L-shaped service wing, and the public house incorporates a former cottage.

== See also ==
- Listed buildings in Adlington
- Listed buildings in Pott Shrigley
- Listed buildings in Rainow
- Listed buildings in Higher Hurdsfield
- Listed buildings in Macclesfield
- Listed buildings in Prestbury
