= Leonard Haigh =

England international rugby union player

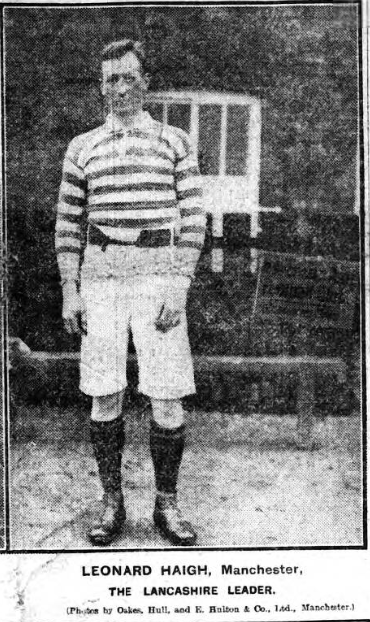
- Born: 19 October 1880
- Died: 6 August 1916 (aged 35)

Rugby union career
Amateur team(s)
Years	Team	Apps	(Points)
1911	Barbarians	2	
Senior career
Years	Team	Apps	(Points)
- Manchester
Provincial / State sides
Years	Team	Apps	(Points)
	Lancashire	18	
International career
Years	Team	Apps	(Points)
1910–1911	England	7	
- Military career
- Burial place: St Christopher's Church, Pott Shrigley; 53.3098°N 2.0847°W
- Allegiance: United Kingdom
- Branch: British Army
- Service years: 1914–1916
- Rank: Private
- Unit: Army Service Corps

Leonard Haigh (19 October 1880 – 6 August 1916) was an English rugby player. He won seven caps for England between 1910 and 1911, and also represented Manchester and Lancashire.

He enlisted with the Army Service Corps at the start of the First World War, and died of pneumonia, which he contracted while on a training exercise. He is buried in Pott Shrigley cemetery.

== Early life and family ==
Leonard Haigh was born on 19 October 1880 in Prestwich, Lancashire, the son of Charles Henry Haigh and Alice Clara Haigh. He attended Sandringham House School in Southport, where he played football and cricket.

He was married in 1912 to Eudora Mason, and they had two sons, John Guy Leonard Haigh and Geoffrey Patrick Haigh.

== Rugby career ==
Haigh took up rugby late in life, playing for Manchester Rugby Club. From there, he earned selection for Lancashire on eighteen occasions, including the match on 25 November 1908 against Australia, then on tour in Britain. He gained his first cap for England at the age of 30, against Wales on 15 January 1910, in the host nation's first match at Twickenham. In the last of the trials matches before the game, Haigh was selected for the Rest against England, and was on the winning side, with England's forwards especially marked out for criticism. The 10–19 defeat caused problems for the selectors, who delayed announcing the team to face Wales. When they did, two days later, Haigh was included in the line up, and on the day, England, who had lost the previous five encounters, beat the Welsh 11–6. He kept his place in the team for the match against Ireland, on 12 February, with the England selectors keeping the same team, with the exception of Mobbs replacing Poulton. After missing the game against France, he played in the match against Scotland on 19 March, but only after another player withdrew from the team.

In 1911, Haigh played in every game of the Five Nations Championship. The selectors at first excluded him from the England side, announced 29 November 1910 for the trials match against the South on 10 December. However, on 3 December, he "shone" in the County Championships match for Lancashire against Cumberland, although on the losing side. For the second trial, on 17 December, Haigh was selected for the North, and although England won the game 23–13 in heavy rain, the North's forwards "were smart... playing particularly well in the loose". "Forward", in the Welsh Evening Express, did not think highly of the England pack, and thought it "imperative that Berry, Griffith and Haigh be included in the national side." Haigh was the only one of the three to be included in the England side for the third trial against the Rest on 7 January.

He was invited to play for the Barbarians in two matches, against Penarth on 14 April 1911, and the following day against Cardiff, in their Easter tour of Wales.

=== International appearances ===
Opposition	Score	Result	Date	Venue	Ref(s)
Wales	11–6	Won	15 January 1910	Twickenham	
Ireland	0–0	Draw	12 February 1910	Twickenham	
Scotland	5–14	Won	19 March 1910	Inverleith	
Wales	15–11	Lost	21 January 1911	Swansea	
France	37–0	Won	28 January 1911	Twickenham	
Ireland	3–0	Lost	11 February 1911	Lansdowne Road	
Scotland	13–8	Won	18 March 1911	Twickenham	

== Military service ==
Haigh joined the Army Service Corps as an Officer Cadet at the start of the First World War. At the time, motor vehicles were beginning to replace horses as a means of transport. Haigh was a motor enthusiast and his mechanical knowledge was of particular value to the Army. He was, therefore, not sent to the front line. He died on 6 August 1916 of pneumonia, which he had contracted during a training exercise. He is buried in the cemetery of St Christopher's Church, Pott Shrigley.

== See also ==
- List of international rugby union players killed in action during the First World War
