= Limefield =

Country house in Bollington, Cheshire, England

Coordinates: 53.30017°N 2.09715°W

Limefield is a house standing to the north of Bollington, Cheshire, England. It was built in about 1830 for Joseph Brook. It is constructed in ashlar brown sandstone, and has a pyramidal roof of Welsh slate with a large stone central chimney. Its plan is square, with an extension to the rear. The house has two storeys, with a symmetrical three-bay front. It is recorded in the National Heritage List for England as a designated Grade II listed building. Its stables and coach house are also listed at Grade II.

== See also ==
- Listed buildings in Bollington
