= Listed buildings in Adlington, Cheshire =

Adlington is a civil parish in Cheshire East, England. It contains 50 buildings that are recorded in the National Heritage List for England as designated listed buildings. Of these, one is listed at Grade I, the highest grade, two are listed at Grade II*, the middle grade, and the others are at Grade II. The major building in the parish is Adlington Hall; the hall and 15 associated structures are listed. Running through the parish is the Macclesfield Canal; eight bridges crossing the canal and three with structures are listed. Apart from the village of Adlington and the grounds of Adlington Hall, the parish is rural, and most of the other listed buildings are houses, cottages, farmhouses and farm buildings. The other listed buildings are a public house, a milestone, and a boundary stone.

== Key ==
Grade	Criteria
I	Buildings of exceptional interest, sometimes considered to be internationally important
II*	Particularly important buildings of more than special interest
II	Buildings of national importance and special interest

== Buildings ==
Name and location	Photograph	Date	Notes	Grade
Adlington Hall; 53.3209°N 2.1446°W		15th century	A large manor house with a quadrangular plan. The north and east ranges are timber-framed, and the rest of the building, dating from the mid-18th century, is in brick with a Neoclassical south front. In 1928 the house was reduced in size by Hubert Worthington, who built a screen wall to fill the gap in the west wing.	I
Brook House Farmhouse; 53.31285°N 2.14495°W	—	16th century	The farmhouse was extended and altered in the 17th century. It is built partly in sandstone and partly in rendered brick, with a Kerridge stone-slate roof. The farmhouse has an L-shaped plan, and contains mullioned windows. The earliest part was timber-framed, and there is internal evidence of this with 1½ pairs of full crucks.	II
Styperson Park Cottage; 53.31795°N 2.10402°W	—	16th century (probable)	A cottage and a shippon, altered in the 17th century and later. It is built in sandstone and has a Kerridge stone-slate roof. At the right gable end is a massive stepped stone chimney. The building is in two storeys, and has a five-bay south front. The windows are casements, and in the shippon is a square pitch hole.	II
Mill House Farmhouse and Cottage; 53.30790°N 2.14063°W	—	1603	This originated as a dower house, which was later converted into a farmhouse and a house. It is timber-framed with brick and plaster infill, and has a Kerridge stone-slate roof. The building is in an E-shaped plan with a two-storey north front. To the rear the walls have been partly replaced in brick and stone. The windows are mullioned and transomed.	II*
Penny Loaves; 53.31238°N 2.13731°W	—	Early 17th century	This originated as the Pole farmhouse, was later converted into a bakehouse and alehouse, then into a house. It is built in rendered stone with a Kerridge stone-slate roof. At first it was a U-shaped building, the ranges of which were later joined. The house is in two storeys, and has a three-bay front. The outer bays are gabled with a small porch between. The windows are casements. Inside, the partitions are timber-framed.	II
Woodlands; 53.33244°N 2.10728°W	—	Early 17th century	Originally a farmhouse, it was later extended and altered and used as a house. The earliest portion is timber-framed, the additions are in stone, then in brick. The house has a Kerridge stone-slate roof, is in an L-shaped plan, and has two storeys. The newer parts are painted in black-and-white to resemble timber-framing.	II
Corn barn, Green Farm; 53.30500°N 2.12065°W		17th century	The barn (now converted into a dwelling) is built in brick on a sandstone plinth, and has an asbestos roof. There is a large central cart entrance with lozenge-shaped ventilation holes on each side. On the right side of the barn is a cart shed. Inside is a timber-framed and brick nogged partition wall.	II
East gates and gate piers, Adlington Hall; 53.32064°N 2.13755°W		17th century	Standing at the eastern approach to the hall, this consists of six gate piers, wing walls, and gates. The outer two piers date from the 17th century, the rest from the mid-19th century. All the piers are in sandstone, the outer piers carrying an urn with a flame. There are railings on the wing walls, and the other piers are simple. In the centre is a pair of carriage gates, and between the other piers are smaller gates.	II
Greenacres and Windle Hey; 53.33608°N 2.13127°W	—	17th century	This originated as Hope Green Farmhouse, but has been divided into two houses. Greenacres is in stuccoed brick with a three-bay front. Windle Hey stands behind, and is in two attached ranges. The roofs are in Kerridge stone-slate, and the windows are sashes.	II
Higher Doles Farmhouse; 53.31084°N 2.11264°W		17th century	The farmhouse is built in sandstone with a tiled roof, and has an H-shaped plan. The north front is in three bays. The left bay has 2½ storeys, projects forward under a gable, and contains mullioned windows. The centre bay is in one storey, and has a two-light sliding-sash window. The right bay has two storeys with 20th-century openings.	II
Lower Pedleyhill Farmhouse; 53.32765°N 2.11065°W	—	17th century	Originally a farmhouse, it was altered in the 18th and 20th centuries into a house. The building is in sandstone with a Kerridge stone-slate roof. It is in two storeys and has a three-bay front. The middle and right bays are original, a buttress separating them from the later left bay. The windows are horizontal-sliding sashes.	II
Walnut Cottage; 53.32534°N 2.11200°W	—	17th century	Now two houses in an L-shaped plan, the original cottage is partly timber-framed and partly in brick, forming the south wing. The east wing dates from 1751, and is brick with two storeys and a three-bay front. The roofs are in Kerridge stone-slate. The windows are casements, and in the south wing is a dormer.	II
Yew Tree Cottage; 53.32722°N 2.11038°W	—	17th century	The cottage is partly timber-framed, with additions made in brick in the 19th century. It has a Kerridge stone-slate roof. The cottage has an L-shaped plan, is in two storeys, and has a three-bay front. There is a central porch, and it contains casement windows.	II
North gates and gate piers, Adlington Hall; 53.32209°N 2.14285°W	—	Late 17th century	The gates and gate piers stand at the northern approach to the hall. The gate piers are in rusticated sandstone and carry ball finials. Between them is a pair of iron gates, the right gate having a small gate within it. Behind the gates are cast iron posts for holding the gates back.	II
Wards End Old Farm; 53.33769°N 2.10879°W	—	Late 17th century	Originally a farmhouse, later used as a house, it is in sandstone with a Kerridge stone-slate roof. It has a rectangular plan, is in two storeys, and has a three-bay front. The windows are mullioned. Inside the house are timber-framed partitions with wattle and daub infill.	II
Winterfold Farmhouse and barn 53.31070°N 2.10585°W	—	Late 17th century	The farmhouse with attached barn was altered in the 19th century. It is built in sandstone and has a Kerridge stone-slate roof. It is a long rectangular building in two storeys with a three-bay front. The windows are casements.	II
Gates to Wilderness garden, Adlington Hall; 53.31985°N 2.14449°W	—	1688	The gate piers are in gritstone. They are rusticated, stand on moulded plinths, and have flat-topped caps. Between them is a pair of wrought iron gates. The right gate contains a smaller gate, and the left gate is inscribed with the date and initials.	II
Maubern Hall; 53.31800°N 2.11714°W		c. 1700	The building originated as a farmhouse and, following alterations, was converted into a house. It is built in brick on a sandstone plinth, and has a Kerridge stone-slate roof. The house is in 2½ storeys, and has a symmetrical seven-bay front. Above the central five bays is a triangular gable. Apart from two mullioned windows, the others are sashes. In the gable is a blocked elliptical light. Above the doorway is a broken segmental pediment. A single-storey wing to the right contains some timber-framing.	II
Holly Cottage; 53.32777°N 2.10514°W	—	Late 17th to early 18th century	The cottage is in sandstone with a Kerridge stone-slate roof, and was extended in the 20th century. It has a long rectangular plan, is in two storeys, and has a four-bay front. The windows are mullioned.	II
White Hall Farmhouse; 53.30640°N 2.12251°W		Early 18th century	The farmhouse was altered in the early 19th century. It is built in sandstone with a Kerridge stone-slate roof. The farmhouse has a rectangular plan, is in two storeys, and has a three-bay front. The windows are sashes under stone lintels.	II
Sundial near Shell Cottage, Adlington Hall; 53.31924°N 2.14379°W	—	Early 18th century (probable)	The sundial is in sandstone. It consists of a barrel-shaped pillar on a square base with a low domed top. It carries an octagonal copper plate and a pierced triangular gnomon. The plate is inscribed with Roman numerals, the longitude, and initials. It is thought that the pillar was originally a Saxon cross base.	II
Adlington Hall Mews; 53.32077°N 2.14341°W	—	1749	Originally the stables and the coach house, they were converted in 1971–74 into eight flats. They are in brick with stone dressings and a Kerridge stone-slate roof. The building is in two storeys, and has a symmetrical nine-bay front. The central three bays project forward under a triangular pediment and contain large Doric pilasters.	II*
Gate piers, Adlington Hall; 53.31818°N 2.14057°W	—	Mid-18th century	A pair of gate piers in sandstone. Each pier has a slightly tapering square body on a tall plinth with a moulded cap. They stood at the south approach to the stable block, but were isolated when the turnpike road was moved in 1801.	II
Shell Cottage, Adlington Hall; 53.31912°N 2.14372°W	—	Mid-18th century	Standing in the Wilderness garden, the cottage is in brick with stone dressings and a stone-slate roof. It is in a single storey, and has a symmetrical three-bay gabled front. The windows are sashes. The room inside the cottage has three of its walls decorated with shells, pebbles and mirrors. The wall leading from the cottage to the kitchen garden is included in the listing.	II
Statue and carved heads Adlington Hall; 53.32111°N 2.14389°W	—	Mid-18th century	These were formerly in the Wilderness garden, and later moved to a position between the house and the stable block. The statue is in lead on a stone plinth, and depicts a naked bearded male figure, tipping over an urn. Behind, in the wall, are the former capstones of two sandstone gate piers bearing carved unicorns' heads.	II
Temple of Diana, Adlington Hall; 53.31704°N 2.14445°W	—	Mid-18th century	Standing in the Wilderness garden, this consists of a domed Doric rotunda in sandstone with a felt roof. Six columns support an entablature, and on the summit of the dome is a golden crescent finial.	II
Tig House, Adlington Hall; 53.31852°N 2.14384°W		Mid-18th century	A square summerhouse in the Wilderness garden, it is in brick and partly painted black and white to resemble timber-framing, and with Chinese-style decoration. It has a stone-slate pyramidal roof with a wooden finial. Inside is a large square stone table.	II
Ha-ha wall, Adlington Hall; 53.32069°N 2.14499°W	—	18th century	The ha-ha retaining wall is in sandstone and runs on the east side of the ditch. At intervals there are projecting stones that act as steps, and in the centre is a causeway with a wooden gate.	II
Green Farmhouse; 53.30553°N 2.12124°W		1770	A brick farmhouse on a stone plinth with a Kerridge stone-slate roof. It has a double-pile plan, is in two storeys, and has a symmetrical three-bay front. The windows are casements.	II
Legh Arms public house 53.32073°N 2.13456°W		Late 18th century	The public house has been modernised. It is in rendered brick with stone dressings and has a Welsh slate roof. The public house is in 2½ storeys, and has a symmetrical three-bay front. The central bay projects slightly forward, and contains a semicircular-headed doorcase. The lower two storeys contain sash windows, and the windows in the top floor are casements.	II
Adlington Hall Mews; 53.32107°N 2.14334°W	—	1817	Originating as stables and hay lofts, they were converted into two flats and a tea room in 1974. They are in brick on a sandstone plinth with a Kerridge stone-slate roof, and form an L-shaped plan. In the north range are stone arches, blocked elliptical pitch holes, and the lines of ventilation holes in a diamond pattern.	II
Milestone; 53.33445°N 2.13192°W	—	c. 1820	The milestone stands on the Stockport to Macclesfield turnpike road. It is in sandstone with a shaped top, and carries a plate inscribed with the distances to London, Stockport, and Macclesfield.	II
Barn, Lower Pedleyhill Farm; 53.32794°N 2.11088°W	—	Early 19th century	The barn is in brick with sandstone dressings and a Welsh slate roof. It has a rectangular plan, and contains a cart entrance, an entrance to a coach house, and three doors to shippons.	II
Boundary stone 53.29798°N 2.11709°W	—	Early 19th century	The stone marks a parish boundary and consists of a square sandstone pillar with a domed top. The letter "B" is inscribed on the south face.	II
Street Lane Farmhouse; 53.33328°N 2.13227°W	—	Early 19th century	A former toll house, later used as a farmhouse. It is in rendered brick with a hipped Welsh slate roof. The house is in two storeys with a three-bay front. The central bay projects forward and contains a rectangular stone doorcase. The windows are casements.	II
Sundial in front lawn, Adlington Hall; 53.32053°N 2.14440°W	—	c. 1825 (probable)	The sundial stands in the centre of the lawn, and is in sandstone. It consists of a partly fluted baluster on an octagonal base standing on a pair of circular steps. On the top is an octagonal capstone with a copper plate and a triangular gnomon. The plate is inscribed with Roman numerals and initials.	II
Canal bridge number 18; 53.33101°N 2.09525°W		c. 1830	A bridge designed by William Crosley carrying Wood Lane East over the Macclesfield Canal. It is built in sandstone and consists of a horseshoe elliptical arch. The bridge has a plain parapet with rounded coping, and ends in square pilasters.	II
Canal bridge number 19; 53.32583°N 2.09702°W		c. 1830	A bridge designed by William Crosley carrying Schoolfold Lane over the Macclesfield Canal. It is built in sandstone and consists of a horseshoe elliptical arch. The bridge has a plain parapet with rounded coping, and ends in square pilasters.	II
Canal bridge number 20; 53.32005°N 2.10283°W		c. 1830	A bridge designed by William Crosley carrying Springbank Lane over the Macclesfield Canal. It is built in sandstone and consists of a horseshoe elliptical arch. The bridge has a plain parapet with rounded coping, and ends in square pilasters.	II
Canal bridge number 21; 53.31826°N 2.10728°W		c. 1830	A bridge designed by William Crosley carrying Brookledge Lane over the Macclesfield Canal. It is built in sandstone and consists of a horseshoe elliptical arch. The bridge has a plain parapet with rounded coping, and ends in square pilasters.	II
Canal bridge number 22; 53.31450°N 2.10846°W		c. 1830	An accommodation bridge over the Macclesfield Canal designed by William Crosley. It is built in sandstone and consists of a horseshoe elliptical arch. The bridge has a plain parapet with rounded coping, and ends in square pilasters.	II
Canal bridge number 23; 53.31084°N 2.10965°W		c. 1830	An accommodation bridge over the Macclesfield Canal designed by William Crosley. It is built in sandstone and consists of a horseshoe elliptical arch. The bridge has a plain parapet with rounded coping, and ends in square pilasters.	II
Canal bridge number 25; 53.30692°N 2.11036°W		c. 1830	A bridge designed by William Crosley carrying Holehouse Lane over the Macclesfield Canal. It is built in sandstone and consists of a horseshoe elliptical arch. The bridge has a plain parapet with rounded coping, and ends in square pilasters. There are steps on the southwest face.	II
Canal bridge number 26; 53.30256°N 2.10547°W		c. 1830	A bridge designed by William Crosley carrying Sugar Lane at an acute angle over the Macclesfield Canal. It is built in sandstone and consists of a horseshoe elliptical arch. The bridge has a plain parapet with rounded coping, and ends in square pilasters. There is a ramp on the southwest corner.	II
Canal distance marker 53.30143°N 2.10326°W		c. 1830	This a shaped block of sandstone on the towpath of the Macclesfield Canal. It is inscribed on one face with "3/1", and on the other with "1/2".	II
Milepost; 53.30675°N 2.11041°W		c. 1830	This consists of a rectangular sandstone block with a shaped top on the towpath of the Macclesfield Canal. It is inscribed with distances, but the locations were erased during the Second World War.	II
Statue of Napoleon, Adlington Hall; 53.32094°N 2.14425°W	—	1837	The statue of Napoleon is in sandstone, and depicts him standing with his hand in his tunic. It stands on a block with an inscription, which includes the date of presentation and the name of the sculptor. The statue was originally at the north front of the house, and was moved to its present position in 1929.	II
Canal fence posts 53.32112°N 2.10085°W		c. 1840	A row of at least 73 fence posts along the outside edge of the towpath of the Macclesfield Canal between bridges number 19 and 20. They are in sandstone and each post is pierced by two railing slots. The posts are evenly placed, although some are missing.	II
Barn, Redbrook Farm; 53.32160°N 2.13077°W	—	1846	The barn originally incorporated a coach house. It is built in sandstone with a Welsh slate roof. In the east front is an almost-central cart entrance under an archway with an inscribed lintel. To the right of this is another entrance, above which are three pitch holes. In the left end is the entrance to the coach house.	II
East Lodge, Adlington Hall; 53.32052°N 2.13771°W	—	Mid-19th century	The lodge is built in brick on a stone plinth with sandstone dressings and a Welsh slate roof. It is in Jacobean style, is in one storey, and has a three-bay front. In the central bay is a porch above which is a triangular gable with ball and obelisk finials. The right bay contains a canted bay window. The windows are sashes.	II

== See also ==
- Listed buildings in Hazel Grove and Bramhall
- Listed buildings in Poynton with Worth
- Listed buildings in Pott Shrigley
- Listed buildings in Bollington
- Listed buildings in Prestbury
