= Daniel Moult =

Daniel Moult (born 1973) is a concert organist, educator and animateur, ensemble player and presenter of films about music.

== Education ==
Daniel Moult was born in Manchester. He attended Manchester Grammar School and St John's College, Oxford, where he was organ scholar. While at Oxford he became a Fellow of the Royal College of Organists winning three of the top prizes, and was jointly awarded the University of Oxford's John Betts Organ Scholarship. He studied as a post-graduate at the Conservatorium van Amsterdam, where his teacher was Jacques van Oortmerssen.

== Career ==
Daniel Moult is Head of Organ at the Birmingham Conservatoire, where he leads an organ department in the UK, with regular trips to Europe and visits from international organists, and new facilities including a purpose built organ studio and £3 million worth of new instruments. He is a trustee of the Royal College of Organists, for which he also examines, and he teaches in London through the RCO Academy.

He was organist and assistant director of music at Coventry Cathedral from 1995 to 2002. He has performed concerts throughout the UK, as well as in Europe, Australia and Asia, and has been a soloist with orchestras such as Kammerorchester Basel, the Czech National Symphony Orchestra, Capella Cracoviensis and the English String Orchestra. He works frequently as an accompanist for choirs such as the choir of St Peter's Church, Eaton Square. In 2010 he toured Switzerland and France with the Kammerorchester Basel as the soloist in Handel's F Major Organ Concerto, Opus 4, and he recorded the B-flat Major Organ Concerto, Opus 4, with the London Early Opera Orchestra for the CD "Handel at Vauxhall", released on Signum Classics. He has been artist in residence at Sydney Grammar School and performs in Australia most years.

Past positions include teaching at the Royal College of Music Junior Department. He has published several editions, including the Easy Bach Album and Easy Handel Album with Bärenreiter and the Complete Church Organist, volumes 1 and 2, with RSCM Publications. His articles on performance practice and performance-related topics have appeared in various music journals.

=== Broadcast and film work ===
Daniel Moult has performed for many broadcasts on BBC Radio 2, Radio 3, Radio 4 and BBC Television, including numerous broadcasts of Songs of Praise and Choral Evensong.

Daniel Moult co-wrote and presented the documentary The Elusive English Organ, a film that traced the development of the English organ from 1550 to 1830, discovering why so few pre-1830 English organs survive and to what extent it is possible to perform repertoire written during this period on instruments from the composers’ times. Locations included Lanvellec, Ploujean, Adlington Hall, St Botolph's Aldgate and St James, Bermondsey. This film was produced by Fugue State Films and released in 2010 on DVD with an accompanying CD with recordings by Daniel Moult of music by William Byrd, Thomas Tomkins, John Blow, Henry Purcell, George Frideric Handel, John Stanley and Samuel Wesley. At the time of its release it was reviewed in The Organists' Review as follows: “This is eloquently articulated, well-paced playing, which reaches far. Moult’s performance of Purcell’s Double Organ Voluntary in D minor is lovely in its maturity and flexibility.”

His second film was Virtuoso! Music for Organ. He performed a programme of virtuosic works by Marcel Dupre, Franz Schmidt, Jehan Alain, Jean Langlais, Maurice Durufle as well as works by contemporary composers Ad Wammes, Graeme Koehne and Andries van Rossem. This was recorded on the organ of Bridlington Priory and released in 2010. Choir and Organ Magazine reviewed it, writing: “To the lay observer, he risks making it all look deceptively easy; but this is a DVD that serious students of the organ will want to revisit for an object lesson in the unfussy performance of some fiendishly difficult repertoire.” Gramophone magazine reviewed it as "a thrilling production...allowing one to marvel even more at Moult's exhilarating musicianship".

He is currently developing "The Imperial English Organ", a follow-up to The Elusive English Organ, which follows the story of the English organ and its repertoire from Handel to the present day, and tells the history of England from the point of view of the pipe organ from the Eighteenth to Twenty-First centuries.

== Discography ==
Partial discography:

- The Elusive English Organ (Fugue State Films)
- Virtuoso! Music for Organ (Fugue State Films)
- Handel: Athalia (Sony BMG) organ concerto soloist with Basel Kammer Orchester and Paul Goodwin.
- Out of the Stillness (RSCM) Millennium Youth Choir conducted by David Ogden with Daniel Moult, organ.
- Arundel Restored (Regent) Daniel Moult, organ, plays the newly restored Hill organ of Arundel Cathedral.
- Handel at Vauxhall (Signum) organ concerto soloist with London Early Opera Orchestra and Bridget Cunningham.
