= Bollington Methodist Church =

Coordinates: 53.2977°N 2.1052°W

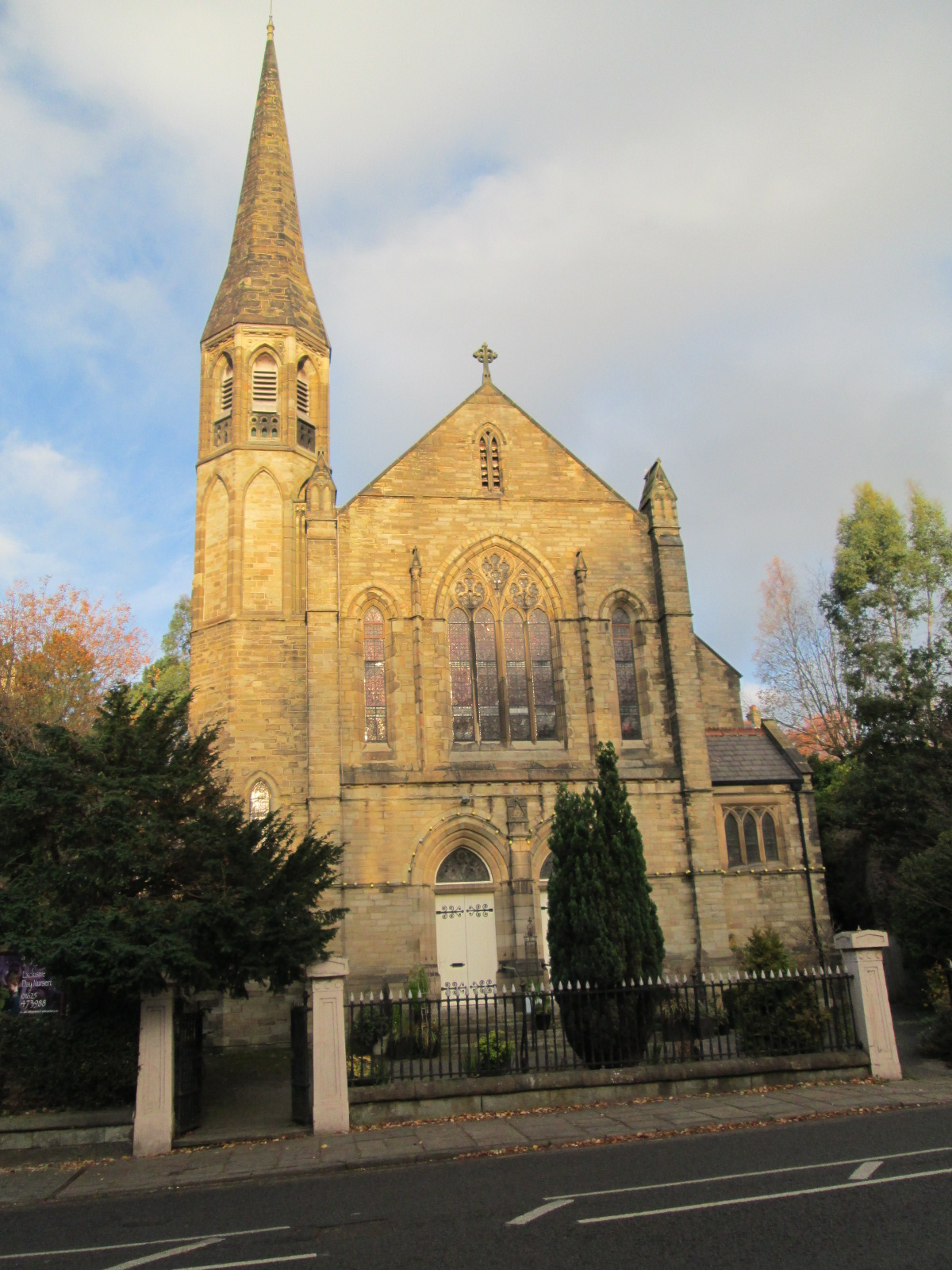
- The building in 2018

- Location in Cheshire
- OS grid reference: SJ 931 779
- Location: Wellington Road, Bollington, Cheshire
- Country: England
- Denomination: Methodist

Architecture
- Functional status: Preserved
- Heritage designation: Grade II
- Designated: 9 December 1983
- Architect: William Waddington
- Architectural type: Church
- Style: Gothic Revival
- Completed: 1886

Specifications
- Materials: Sandstone, slate roof

Bollington Methodist Church is located on Wellington Road in Bollington, Cheshire, England. The church is recorded in the National Heritage List for England (NHLE) as a designated Grade II listed building.

== History ==
The church was built in 1886, and designed by the Manchester architect William Waddington. Internal alterations were carried out in 1959.

In 2012 worship ceased, and the building was sold. In 2016 the lower floor was converted into a childcare centre.

== Architecture ==
Constructed in buff ashlar sandstone, the church has a Welsh slate roof with a tiled ridge. Its architectural style is that of the 13th century. It consists of a five-bay nave with a southwest steeple, and is aligned almost north–south. On the south, the entrance front has four steps leading to twin-lancet doorways. Over these is a four-light window containing Geometric tracery, flanked by lancet windows. The hexagonal tower has four stages with louvred bell openings at the top stage. It is surmounted by a broach spire. Along the sides of the church are mullioned and transomed lancet windows. Inside the church is a south gallery. Some of the windows contain stained glass.

== See also ==
- Listed buildings in Bollington
