= Listed buildings in Pott Shrigley =

Pott Shrigley is a civil parish in Cheshire East, England. It contains 19 buildings that are recorded in the National Heritage List for England as designated listed buildings. Of these, one is listed at Grade I, the highest grade, one is listed at Grade II*, the middle grade, and the others are at Grade II. Apart from the village of Pott Shrigley, the parish is almost entirely rural. Most of the listed buildings are farmhouses and farm buildings, houses and cottages. Parts of the Macclesfield Canal run through the parish, and the listed buildings associated with this are a bridge, an aqueduct, and fence posts. The other listed structures are a church and churchyard cross, a school, a hotel and leisure centre, a telephone kiosk, and a parish boundary stone.

== Key ==
Grade	Criteria
I	Buildings of exceptional interest, sometimes considered to be internationally important
II*	Particularly important buildings of more than special interest
II	Buildings of national importance and special interest

== Buildings ==
Name and location	Photograph	Date	Notes	Grade
Cross; 53.30968°N 2.08462°W	—	Medieval (probable)	A preaching cross in the churchyard of St Christopher's Church. The base consists of two large square stone blocks, probably dating form the medieval era. Standing on this is a tall octagonal shaft with a cross-piece probably added in the late 18th or early 19th century. The cross is also a scheduled monument.	II
St Christopher's Church; 53.30977°N 2.08483°W		15th century	The church is built in sandstone and has a stone-slate roof. It consists of a nave, a small south porch, aisles, a chancel and a west tower with a clock, battlemented parapet and pinnacles. Inside the church are box pews.	I
Farm buildings, Redacre Hall; 53.33056°N 2.08482°W	—	16th century	The farm buildings form three sides of a courtyard. The barn in the west range dates from the 16th century. It was refurbished, and the other buildings were added, in the early 19th century. The barn is partly timber-framed and partly in sandstone with a Kerridge stone-slate roof. It is in three bays and was originally in two storeys. It contains entrances, pitch holes, and ventilation slots.	II
Pott Hall; 53.30889°N 2.08253°W	—	Late 16th century	This originated as a timber-framed farmhouse with an L-shaped plan. The walls were later replaced in sandstone, the house was remodelled in the 18th century, and in the following century two wings were added. It has a Kerridge stone-state roof, it is in three storeys, and has a front of three bays. The windows are mullioned and transomed, and contain casements. Inside the house some timber-framing remains.	II
Cophurst and Cophurst Knot; 53.32275°N 2.08569°W	—	Late 17th century	Originally a farmhouse, then three cottages, later converted into two houses. The building is in stone with a Kerridge stone-state roof, it is in two storeys, and has a long rectangular plan. The door has a massive lintel. There is one stone window that has lost its mullion, two horizontal sliding sash windows, the rest being wooden 20th-century casements.	II
Parish boundary stone 53.30350°N 2.08673°W	—	18th century	The stone stands on the boundary of the parishes of Bollington and Pott Shrigley. It is a rectangular sandstone block with a shaped curved top, is half-buried, and is carved with the letters "B" (for Bollington) and "S" (for Pott Shrigley).	II
The Croft; 53.31015°N 2.08469°W	—	Mid-18th century	The house is built in stone, and has been painted to simulate timber framing. The roof is in Kerridge stone-state, the house is in two storeys, and it has a three bay front. The doorway has a semicircular head and a recessed porch. The windows are casements. To the right is a 19th-century single-bay extension.	II
Sherrowbooth; 53.30560°N 2.06273°W	—	1770	A sandstone farmhouse with a Kerridge stone=slate roof. It has a double pile plan, is in two storeys, and has a symmetrical three-bay front. The doorcase has square pilasters, and a shaped lintel with a false keystone. The windows are 20th-century casements. Above the door is a datestone.	II
Shrigley Hall; 53.31513°N 2.08763°W		c. 1825	Originating as a country house, it later became a missionary college, and then a hotel. It is in Regency style, and is constructed in sandstone with slate roofs. The building is in two storeys, and has a symmetrical eleven–bay front. The central three bays project forward, and contain a portico with four Ionic columns and a pediment with a frieze. The doorway has an architrave and a rectangular fanlight. The windows are sashes.	II*
Birchencliff Farmhouse and farm buildings 53.32161°N 2.07886°W	—	Early 19th century	This was built as a model farm and some of the farm buildings have been converted for domestic use. The complex consists of a farmhouse and two courtyards of farm buildings, all in sandstone with Kerridge stone-slate roofs. The farmhouse is in two storeys, it has an L-shaped plan, a symmetrical three-bay front, and contains sash windows.	II
Church Cottages; 53.30944°N 2.08439°W	—	Early 19th century	A pair of sandstone cottages with Kerridge stone-slate roofs. They are in two storeys, and each cottage has a two-bay front. The windows have pointed heads, and containing casements with Gothick tracery above. The doors have plain lintels.	II
Pott Hall Farmhouse; 53.30951°N 2.08400°W	—	Early 19th century	The former farmhouse is built in sandstone with a Kerridge stone-slate roof. It is in two storeys, and has a symmetrical front of three bays. The windows and doorway have pointed heads, the windows containing casements with Gothick tracery above. Over the door is a fanlight.	II
Aqueduct; 53.33544°N 2.08225°W		c. 1830	The aqueduct carries the Macclesfield Canal over Shrigley Road, the engineer being William Crosley. It is built in sandstone and consists of a single segmental arch, with curving revetment walls. There are stone steps on the northwest side.	II
Bridge No. 17; 53.33532°N 2.08394°W		c. 1830	An accommodation bridge over the Macclesfield Canal, for which the engineer was William Crosley. It has a pair of sandstone piers with square pilasters at each end, with slots carrying a wooden roadway. At the northeast corner is a cobbled ramp down to the towpath.	II
Canal fence posts 53.32112°N 2.10085°W		c. 1840	A row of at least 73 fence posts along the outside edge of the towpath of the Macclesfield Canal between bridges number 19 and 20. They are in sandstone and each post is pierced by two railing slots. The posts are evenly placed, although some are missing.	II
Green Close Farmhouse; 53.32998°N 2.07602°W	—	Mid-19th century	A combined farmhouse and farm building, in sandstone with a tiled roof. The building has a double pile plan, it is in two storeys, and has a symmetrical three-bay front. The front is gabled with plain bargeboards, and the windows are 20th-century casements. To the right is a cart entrance and doors into shippons, with square pitch holes above.	II
School; 53.30991°N 2.08414°W		c. 1861	The school was restored and extended in 1967. It is built in sandstone with a Kerridge stone-slate roof, and the original part has a double pile plan. The school is in a single storey with a basement, and the road front has two bays. In the basement are three-light mullioned windows, and in the storey above the windows are sashes.	II
Chapel, Shrigley Hall; 53.31473°N 2.08731°W		1933–38	The chapel was designed by Philip Tilden for the Salesian Order. It is built in sandstone and has a slate roof. It consists of a central octagonal lantern, from which arise four principal arms and four subsidiary ones. It has been converted into a leisure suite for the hotel.	II
Telephone kiosk 53.30970°N 2.08419°W	—	1935	A K6 type telephone kiosk, designed by Giles Gilbert Scott. Constructed in cast iron with a square plan and a dome, it has three unperforated crowns in the top panels.	II

== See also ==
- Listed buildings in Poynton with Worth
- Listed buildings in Lyme Handley
- Listed buildings in Rainow
- Listed buildings in Bollington
- Listed buildings in Adlington, Cheshire
