= Hollin Old Hall =

Country house in Bollington, Cheshire, England

Coordinates: 53.29447°N 2.09963°W

Hollin Old Hall is a house in Bollington, Cheshire, England. The oldest part of the house dates from the seventeenth century. In the middle of the eighteenth century the roof was raised, and an addition was made to the rear of the house for Richard Broster. It was remodelled and expanded in about 1870 for the Ascoli family. The building has since been divided into two houses. It is constructed in coursed buff sandstone rubble, with a Kerridge stone-slate roof, a stone ridge, and stone chimneys. The house is in two storeys over a barrel-roofed cellar. The main front has three bays with nineteenth-century four-light windows, and two gables, each with a two-light window. Elsewhere the house is in Jacobean style, with windows that are mullioned and transomed, or just mullioned. In the cellar is a large slab inscribed "This must stand here forever, Richard Broster 1757". The house is recorded in the National Heritage List for England as a designated Grade II listed building.

== See also ==
- Listed buildings in Bollington
