= Bob Cooke (cricketer) =

English cricketer (born 1943)

Personal information
- Full name: Robert Michael Oliver Cooke
- Born: 3 September 1943 (age 83); Adlington, Cheshire, England
- Batting: Left-handed
- Bowling: Leg break googly
- Role: Occasional wicket-keeper

Domestic team information
- Years: Team
- 1978: Minor Counties East
- 1976–1984: Cheshire
- 1973–1975: Essex
- 1972–1979: Minor Counties North
- 1972–1976: Minor Counties
- 1969–1972: Cheshire

Career statistics
Competition	First-class	List A
Matches	42	46
Runs scored	1,450	645
Batting average	22.30	15.73
100s/50s	2/4	–/4
Top score	139	83
Balls bowled	264	251
Wickets	4	–
Bowling average	46.00	–
5 wickets in innings	–	–
10 wickets in match	–	–
Best bowling	2/55	–
Catches/stumpings	25/–	13/–
- Source: Cricinfo, 2 December 2011

Robert Michael Oliver Cooke (born 3 September 1943) is a former English cricketer. Cooke was a left-handed batsman who bowled leg break googly. He was born at Adlington, Cheshire.
