= Shrigley Hall =

Country house in Cheshire, England

Coordinates: 53.31520°N 2.08760°W

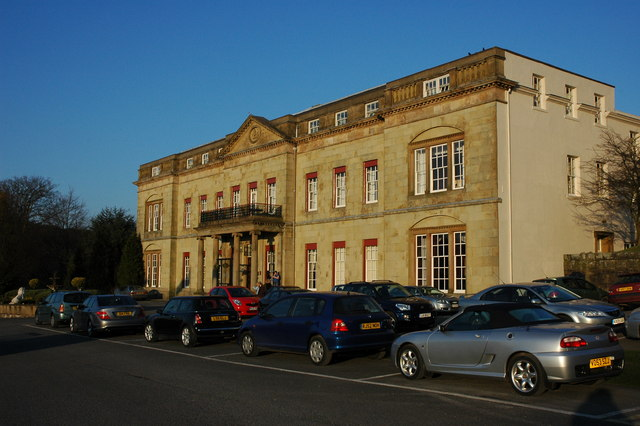
Shrigley Hall

Shrigley Hall is a former country house standing to the northwest of the village of Pott Shrigley, Cheshire, England. It has since been used as a school, when a chapel was added, and later as a hotel and country club operated by The Hotel Collection.

== History ==
The hall was built in about 1825 for William Turner, a Blackburn mill owner and Member of Parliament. The architect was Thomas Emmet senior from Preston. During the 20th century the building was used as a school by the religious institute of the Salesians of Don Bosco, who in 1936 added a chapel to the south of the house, dedicating it to Saint John Bosco. This was designed by the Arts and Crafts architect Philip Tilden. An attic was added to the house in the middle of the 20th century. In 1989 the house and church were converted into a hotel and country club.

== Architecture ==
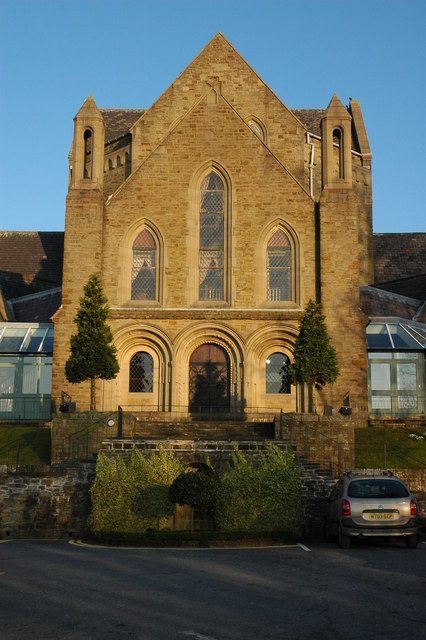
The chapel dates from 1936

=== House ===
This is designed in Regency style, and constructed in ashlar brown sandstone with slate roofs. The house has two storeys and an attic, with a symmetrical entrance front of eleven bays. The central three bays and the bays at each end project forward slightly. At the centre, five steps lead up to a portico with four Ionic columns supporting a pediment with a plain frieze. In the pediment is a medallion containing a lion and a cross. The windows are sashes, those in the end bays having three lights; elsewhere they have single lights. The doorway has a curved architrave, over which is a rectangular fanlight. To the rear of the house are two wings in rubble stone, the one on the left having three storeys, and the one on the right two storeys. Originally the entrance hall was open internally to a dome and a skylight, and it contained an Imperial staircase. The staircase has been removed and a floor inserted. The interior contains "good Neoclassical plasterwork". The house is recorded in the National Heritage List for England as a designated Grade II* listed building.

=== Chapel ===
Designed by Philip Tilden and built between 1936 and 1938, the chapel is constructed in sandstone rubble with a slate roof. Its plan consists of an octagonal nave with a transept at each cardinal point, and a chancel. Radiating outwards between the transepts are small chapels. The ground floor includes Romanesque features including round-headed arches, and above them there are lancet windows. Over the nave is a domical vault. The chapel contains paired round-headed sedilia on each side. Tilden painted the Stations of the Cross and the altarpiece, but with the conversion of the building into a hotel, the fittings have been removed. The chapel is designated as a Grade II listed building.

== See also ==
- Grade II* listed buildings in Cheshire East
- Listed buildings in Pott Shrigley
