= Endon Hall =

Country house in Cheshire, England

Coordinates: 53.28539°N 2.09729°W

Endon Hall is a country house to the south of Bollington and to the west of Kerridge Hill in Cheshire, England. It was built for William Clayton who developed a quarry nearby. Building of the house started in the 1830s, and it was enlarged in the 1850s. Associated with the house are two structures recorded in the National Heritage List for England (NHLE) as designated Grade II listed buildings. In the farm to the east of the house are stables, built at the same time as the house. They are constructed in coursed buff sandstone rubble with ashlar dressings, and have Kerridge stone-slate roofs. The stables are in two storeys, with a courtyard plan. They have a symmetrical front of five bays, with the central and end bays stepped slightly forward. In the centre bay is a coach entrance. The parapet is castellated. On the roof is a two-tier dovecote with a clock in the upper tier. Also on the roof is a hexagonal wooden open bellcote with a copper-domed roof and a weather vane. In the garden to the south of the house is a sandstone icehouse, built in about 1840.

== See also ==
- Listed buildings in Bollington
