= St Christopher's Church, Pott Shrigley =

Coordinates: 53.3098°N 2.0847°W

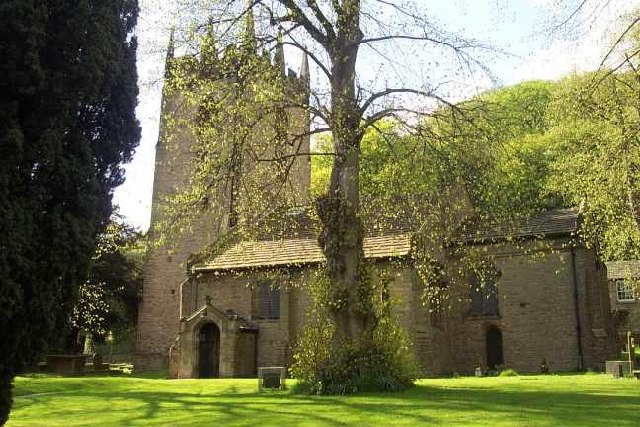
- St Christopher's Church, Pott Shrigley, from the southeast

- Location in Cheshire
- OS grid reference: SJ 945 792
- Location: Pott Shrigley, Cheshire
- Country: England
- Denomination: Anglican
- Website: St Christopher, Pott Shrigley

History
- Status: Parish church
- Dedication: Saint Christopher

Architecture
- Functional status: Active
- Heritage designation: Grade I
- Designated: 14 April 1967
- Architectural type: Church
- Style: Gothic

Specifications
- Materials: Sandstone, stone-slate roof

Administration
- Province: York
- Diocese: Chester
- Archdeaconry: Macclesfield
- Deanery: Macclesfield
- Parish: St Christopher, Pott Shrigley

Clergy
- Priest: Rev David Swales

St Christopher's Church is in the small village of Pott Shrigley, Cheshire, England. The church is recorded in the National Heritage List for England as a designated Grade I listed building. It is an active Anglican parish church in the diocese of Chester, the archdeaconry of Macclesfield and the deanery of Macclesfield.

== History ==
The church was originally a chapel of ease for the parish of Prestbury. It was probably founded in the late 14th century and completed in its present form with the building of the Downes chantry chapel. The east window was restored in 1872.

== Architecture ==
=== Exterior ===
The plan consists of a west tower, a short nave of two bays, wide north and south aisles and a chancel. The tower is relatively large for the size of the church, with battlements and pinnacles and a four-faced clock dated 1809 made by Thomas Schofield of Manchester. The roofs of the nave and chancel are original and in good condition; the nave roof is camber beam in type and a dormer window has been added to it at a later date. The roofs of the aisles were plastered over in early Georgian times. The style of the architecture is almost entirely Perpendicular.

=== Interior ===
Some of the box pews were moved from St James' Church, Gawsworth when that church was restored in the 19th century. A holy table in the north aisle is dated 1695, and the altar rails are also from an early date. The font is of grey marble and probably dates from the late 18th century. Two sanctuary chairs date from the late 17th century. The Royal arms of George III are placed over the chancel arch. The monuments are mainly to the Downes and Lowther families. One of these, dated 1798 is by John Bacon, and another, dated 1840 is by A. Gatley. The east window contains much original glass despite the 1872 restoration by Clayton and Bell.

There is a ring of six bells. The two earliest date from around 1499 and are thought to be by Robert Crouch; a bell dated 1607 is by Henry Oldfield II and another dated 1796 is by Edward Arnold. The newest bells were cast in 1986 by Eijsbouts. The parish registers for baptisms begin in 1629; burials and marriages were added in 1685. The churchwardens' accounts start in 1833.

== External features ==
In the churchyard is an ancient preaching cross, the base consisting of two large square blocks which are probably medieval. The tall octagonal shaft and cross piece were possibly added when the cross was repaired in the late 18th or early 19th century. The cross is listed at Grade II, and is a scheduled monument.

== Bells ==
The original bells are a ring of three by Robert Crowch, each bearing his mark and the three leopard badge of the Plantagenets. They are reported to date from 1439, in the reign of Henry VI, but the tenor was recast in 1607 by Henry Oldfield of Birmingham, and Crouch's marks have been lost. Inscriptions in English Black letter are as follows:

Treble: "Sancte Xstophere ora pro nobis" – St. Christopher pray for us 2nd: "Nomen Magdalene gerit campana melodie" – In the name of Magdalene make a joyous ring.

== See also ==
- Grade I listed buildings in Cheshire East
- Grade I listed churches in Cheshire
- Listed buildings in Pott Shrigley
