= Adlington, Cheshire =

Village in Cheshire, England

Coordinates: 53.319°N 2.133°W

Adlington
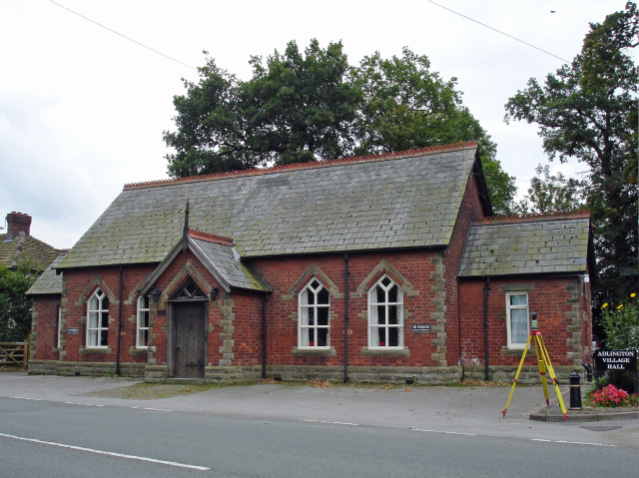
- Adlington village hall

- Location within Cheshire
- Population: 1,081
- OS grid reference: SJ912803
- Civil parish: Adlington
- Unitary authority: Cheshire East
- Ceremonial county: Cheshire
- Region: North West
- Country: England
- Sovereign state: United Kingdom
- Post town: MACCLESFIELD
- Postcode district: SK10
- Dialling code: 01625
- Police: Cheshire
- Fire: Cheshire
- Ambulance: North West
- UK Parliament: Macclesfield

Adlington is a village and civil parish in the unitary authority of Cheshire East and the ceremonial county of Cheshire, England. It was known as Eduluintune in the Domesday Book. According to the 2001 census the civil parish had a population of 1,081 people across 401 households. There is a mixed, non-denominational primary school in the village.

== History ==
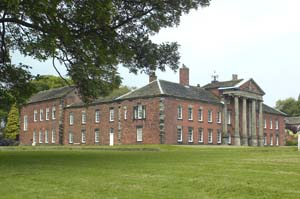
Adlington Hall

Adlington was a chapelry and township in Prestbury ancient parish. It became a separate civil parish in 1866 and had slight changes to its civil parish boundaries in 1936. It was in Hamestan hundred, which later became Macclesfield Hundred and, later still, was assigned to be part of Macclesfield Poor Law Union and Rural Sanitary District. When Macclesfield Rural District council was established in 1894, Adlington became a civil parish within it. In 1974, local government reorganisation led to it becoming part of the Borough of Macclesfield, which in turn was succeeded by Cheshire East Council in 2009.

Adlington Hall, dating from at least the end of the 13th century, is located at the western end of the village.

Adlington made the news in January 2008, when a delivery vehicle shed 18 tonnes of mango chutney onto the road through the village. A spokesman for F Swain and Sons, the company which owns the lorry, said: "It was just one of those things."

== Adlington New Town proposal ==
Adlington was identified as a site for a potential new town in 2025. Belport, a London-based international investment and asset management company, acquired the 1,900-acre (770 ha) Adlington estate from Camilla Legh, a member of the family who had occupied Adlington Hall for 700 years, in 2023 for £25 million. Belport specialises in investment in the rural market with a view "to maximise capital and income returns". Belport submitted a bid to the New Towns Taskforce for a new town at Adlington in 2025 and the proposal was included on the shortlist of twelve proposed new towns published by the taskforce in September 2025. Belport already owns 82% of the land associated with the new town proposal. Belport have a delivery partner for the proposed new town, Revcap, a London-based equity investment company, who describe themselves as having “a private equity approach to value creation with best in class institutional investment disciplines and prudent leverage policies to seek superior risk adjusted returns in its core plus investments”.

The proposal has been met with significant opposition in the local area, including from the local Labour MP, Tim Roca. In December 2025, Cheshire East local authority voted unanimously (70–0) against the planned new town development. Several public protests from local residents have been held near to the proposed development. In evidence to the House of Lords Built Environment Committee, Niall Bolger (non executive Director of Belport) admitted that there was no consultation with residents or the wider local community before the new towns bid was submitted. The proposed site is largely a greenfield site with over 1,000 hectares (2,500 acres) of greenbelt land. The current proposals are for up to 20,000 new homes (roughly 47,000 population) to be added to the area. This will create a new town with a similar population to nearby Macclesfield.

In March 2026 the government revealed that it had decided Adlington would not be expanded to become a new town. In a statement, the government said Adlington and other areas would not be taken forward as new towns, but were "deemed to be credible development opportunities and may continue to be supported through existing housing programmes".

== Governance ==
Adlington Parish Council, which administers the civil parish, is made up of ten parish councillors and one parish clerk. The parish council sits each month, and at these meetings, the two borough and single county councillor will also often attend.

== Transport ==
Adlington railway station is a stop on the Stafford to Manchester branch of the West Coast Main Line. It is served by Northern Trains services between Manchester Piccadilly, Stockport, Macclesfield and Stoke-on-Trent.

== Notable people ==
- Bob Cooke (born 1943), a former English cricketer, played 42 first class matches
- Martin Edwards (born 1945), former chairman of Manchester United F.C. from 1980 until 2002.
- Sir Carol Mather (1919–2006), British soldier and MP for Esher 1970-1987.

== See also ==
- Listed buildings in Adlington, Cheshire
