= Holly Bush, Bollington =

Pub in Bollington, Cheshire, England

Coordinates: 53.29795°N 2.09722°W

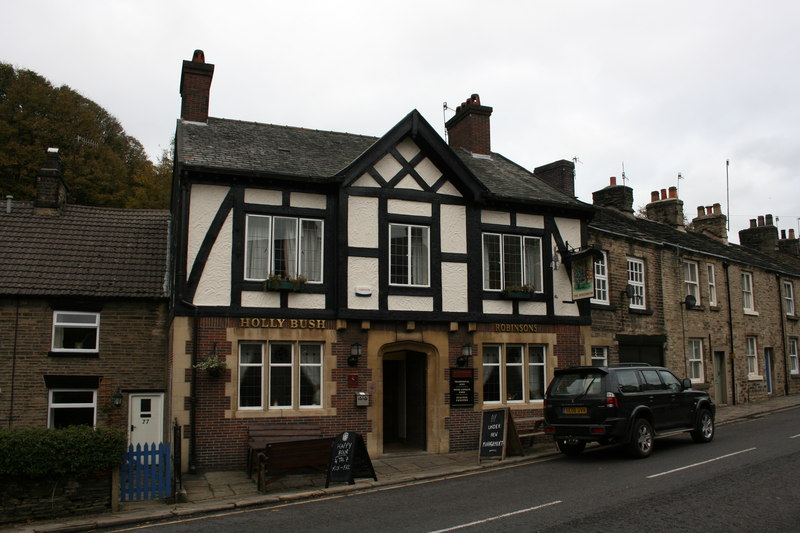
The Holly Bush in 2012

The Holly Bush is a public house at 75 Palmerston Street in Bollington, Macclesfield, Cheshire, England. It is recorded in the National Heritage List for England (NHLE) as a designated Grade II listed building.

The public house is included in the National Inventory of Historic Pub Interiors by the Campaign for Real Ale (CAMRA). It was built in about 1935 and is a rare example of an almost intact "Brewer's Tudor" style pub from this period.

== See also ==
- Listed buildings in Bollington
