= Gordon Shrigley =

British architect (born 1964)

Gordon Shrigley (born 1964) is a British architect. His work is primarily concerned with materiality, the language of drawing and artists' book publishing. In 2004 Shrigley founded the artists’ bookwork project Marmalade, Publishers of Visual Theory, which in 2007 expanded into Filmarmalade a DVD publisher of artists' film and video works. Filmarmalade has published work by artists, including two works by Karen Mirza and Brad Butler, with screenings at the BFI and the Arnolfini, Bristol.

== Life and work ==
Shrigley studied at Bournville College of Art, Birmingham; the University of Birmingham; the Polytechnic of Central London, the University of Westminster and the Slade School of Fine Art, London.

== Built Works ==
Since 2007 he has designed a number of architectural Projects, which include: Project for a mid terrace building, 274 Bethnal Green Road, Bethnal Green, London, completed 2011. Project for a mid terrace conversion, facade retention and roof extension, 184-186 Brick Lane, Spitalfields, London, completed 2015. Project for an end of terrace building, 49-51 Raven Row, Whitechapel, London, completed 2016. Project for a mid terrace building, 276 Bethnal Green Road, Bethnal Green, London, completed 2017. Project for a mid terrace, three storey roof extension, 1A Mentmore Terrace, London, completed 2018 and Project for a minor Siedlung, 30 Upminster Road, Rainham, London, due to complete autumn 2018.

== Exhibitions ==
Solo exhibitions include the Centre for Contemporary Art, Sacramento; IMT Gallery, London, and Schloss Solitude Galerie, Stuttgart. Group exhibitions include the Musée d'art Moderne, Saint-Etienne, France, Staatsgalerie Stuttgart, Germany, Centre for Drawing Research, London, Fruehsorge Contemporary Drawings, Berlin and the Centre For New Music, San Francisco

== Collections ==
A selection of his architectural drawings are held at The Staatsgalerie drawing and print collection, Stuttgart, Germany, the Academy Schloss Solitude archive collection, Stuttgart, Germany, the Musée d'art Moderne, Saint-Etienne, France, the Ludwigsburg State Archives, Germany and a number of private collections.

== Projects ==
In the 2015 general election, he founded the political party Campaign and stood as a prospective MP in his local Hackney South and Shoreditch constituency.
