= Arabella Hunt =

English musician (1662–1705)

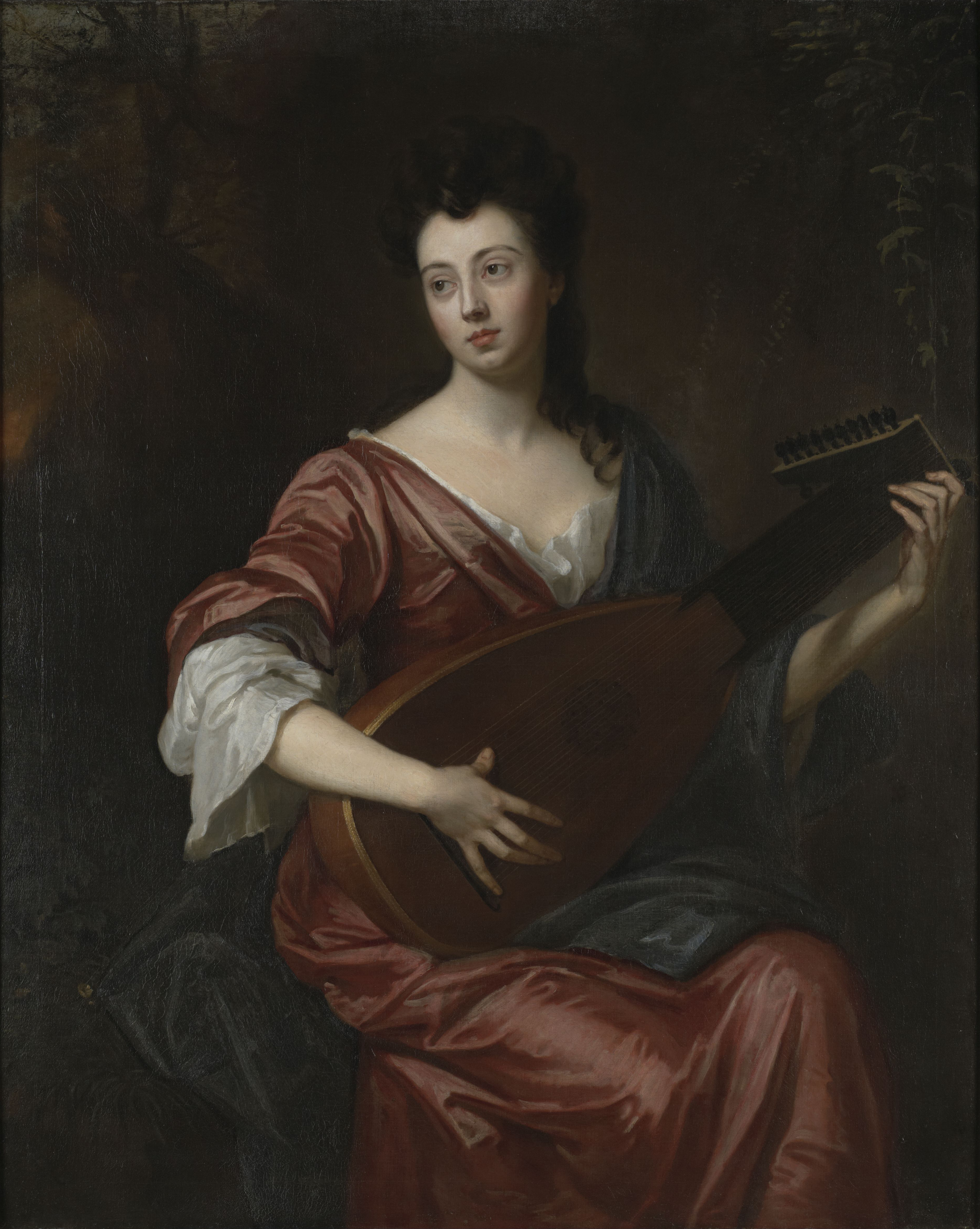
Arabella Hunt

Arabella Hunt (27 February 1662 – 26 December 1705) was an English soprano and lutenist who was celebrated for the beauty of her singing voice.

== Early life ==
Arabella Hunt was born in London on 27 February 1662 to Richard and Elizabeth Hunt. She sang at court and is recorded to have performed a part in the court masque "Calisto, or the Chaste Nymph" by John Crowne in 1675. In 1678 or 1679, her father died, and as the only surviving child (two siblings died in childhood), she inherited a house at Upton in Buckinghamshire.

== Marriage ==
On 12 September 1680 Hunt married James Howard at St Marylebone Parish Church, and the couple moved into her mother's house at the Haymarket. However, after six months of living together Hunt left her husband, and instituted a case against him at the consistory court in London, seeking to annul the marriage on the grounds that Howard was not in fact a man, but was actually a woman called Amy Poulter (née Gomeldon). Moreover, at the time of their marriage, Poulter was already married to a man called Arthur Poulter, who had only died recently. Hunt further claimed that her 'husband' was an hermaphrodite, but when Howard/Poulter was examined by five midwives appointed as the jury in the case it was found that she was a biologically ordinary woman.

The marriage was eventually annulled on 15 December 1682, on the basis that two women could not legally marry each other. Both women were now free to remarry, but Poulter died very shortly afterwards, and Hunt remained unmarried for the rest of her life.

== Career ==
For many years, Hunt was employed at the royal court as a singer and lutenist. She was well thought of by Queen Mary II, and taught singing to Princess Anne. Later Queen Mary gave her an annual pension of £100.

John Hawkins tells with great detail how the queen, after listening to some of Henry Purcell's music performed by Hunt, John Gostling, and the composer, abruptly asked her to sing a popular Scottish ballad, Cold and Raw, which she did, accompanying herself on the lute. Purcell, according to Hawkins, was "not a little nettled" by the queen's preference, and when he composed a birthday ode for Queen Mary in 1692 he used Cold and Raw as the repeated bass line for the "May her blest example" movement.

Hunt's voice was said by a contemporary to be like the pipe of a bullfinch; she was also credited with an "exquisite hand on the lute". She was admired and respected by the best wits of the time; John Blow and Purcell wrote difficult music for her; John Hughes, the poet, was her friend; William Congreve wrote a long irregular ode on "Mrs. Arabella Hunt singing", and after her death penned an epigram under a portrait of her sitting on a bank singing. The painting was by Godfrey Kneller. There are mezzotints by Smith (1706) and Charles Grignion the Elder; and Hawkins gives a vignette in his History. In an ode, On the Excellency of Mrs Hunt's Voice, and Manner of Singing, composed in 1700, John Blow declared that "she reigns alone, is Queen of Musick by the People's choice".

== Death ==
Hunt died, aged 43, at home in London on 26 December 1705.
