= Pott Shrigley =

Village in Cheshire, England

Coordinates: 53.309°N 2.084°W

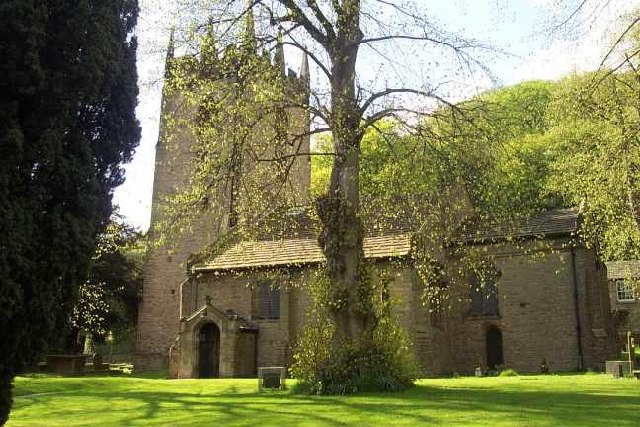
- St Christopher's Church, Pott Shrigley

- Location within Cheshire
- Population: 220
- OS grid reference: SJ944791
- Civil parish: Pott Shrigley
- Unitary authority: Cheshire East
- Ceremonial county: Cheshire
- Region: North West
- Country: England
- Sovereign state: United Kingdom
- Post town: MACCLESFIELD
- Postcode district: SK10
- Dialling code: 01625
- Police: Cheshire
- Fire: Cheshire
- Ambulance: North West
- UK Parliament: Macclesfield

Pott Shrigley is a small village and civil parish in the unitary authority of Cheshire East and the ceremonial county of Cheshire, England. According to the 2001 census, the civil parish and village has a population of 289. The nearest town is Bollington to the southwest.

The village has a Church of England primary school with around 22 pupils. The school was founded in 1492 and celebrated its 500th anniversary in 1992. The Village Hall is owned and run by an independent charity. The majority of the village hall provides the accommodation for the school, whilst the church makes regular use of the village hall in the evening and at weekends. The Village Hall Social Club organises various social and fundraising events during the year, operates a members' bar, and has recently established a monthly community cinema.

Sir John de Shriggeley (died after 1405), a leading statesman and judge in late fourteenth century Ireland, who held office as Lord Chief Justice of Ireland, was the son of another John de Shriggeley, a Cheshire man who is thought to have taken his name from his birthplace, Pott Shrigley, and later moved to Ireland.

== Shrigley Hall ==
The village is most notable for Shrigley Hall a Grade II* listed building), It was originally a private residence of the Downes family of Shrigley & Worth for almost 500 years until the early 19th century.

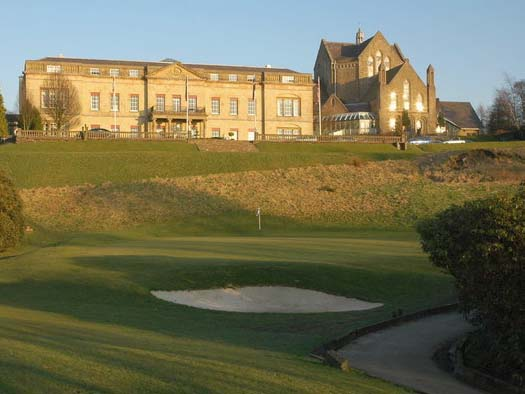
Shrigley Hall in 2008

In 1929 the hall and 260 acres (105 ha) of grounds were purchased by the Catholic Salesian order to become the Salesian Missionary College. Some 2,000 boys were educated there by 1986 when the college closed due to growing running costs, falling vocations and decreasing missionary work. In 1989 the hall was converted into a country club with an 18-hole golf course, leisure centre and a restaurant.

== See also ==
- Listed buildings in Pott Shrigley
