= List of schools in Stockport =

This is a list of schools in the Metropolitan Borough of Stockport in the English county of Greater Manchester.

== State-funded schools ==
=== Primary schools ===
- Abingdon Primary School, Reddish
- Adswood Primary School, Adswood
- Alexandra Park Primary School, Edgeley
- All Saints CE Primary School, Heaton Norris
- All Saints CE Primary School, Marple
- Arden Primary School, Bredbury
- Banks Lane Infant School, Offerton
- Banks Lane Junior School, Offerton
- Bolshaw Primary School, Heald Green
- Bradshaw Hall Primary School, Cheadle Hulme
- Bredbury Green Primary School, Romiley
- Bredbury St Marks CE Primary School, Bredbury
- Bridge Hall Primary School, Adswood
- Broadstone Hall Primary School, Heaton Chapel
- Brookside Primary School, High Lane
- Cale Green Primary School, Shaw Heath
- Cheadle RC Infant School, Cheadle Hulme
- Cheadle RC Junior School, Cheadle Hulme
- Cheadle Heath Primary School, Cheadle Heath
- Cheadle Hulme Primary School, Cheadle Hulme
- Cheadle Primary School, Cheadle
- Dial Park Primary School, Offerton
- Didsbury Road Primary School, Heaton Mersey
- Etchells Primary School, Heald Green
- Fairway Primary School, Offerton
- Gatley Primary School, Gatley
- Great Moor Infant School, Great Moor
- Great Moor Junior School, Great Moor
- Greave Primary School, Woodley
- Hazel Grove Primary School, Hazel Grove
- High Lane Primary School, High Lane
- Hursthead Infant School, Cheadle Hulme
- Hursthead Junior School, Cheadle Hulme
- Ladybridge Primary School, Cheadle
- Ladybrook Primary School, Bramhall
- Lane End Primary School, Cheadle Hulme
- Lark Hill Primary School, Edgeley
- Ludworth Primary School, Marple Bridge
- Lum Head Primary School, Gatley
- Meadowbank Primary School, Cheadle
- Mellor Primary School, Mellor
- Mersey Vale Primary School, Heaton Mersey
- Moorfield Primary School, Hazel Grove
- Moss Hey Primary School, Bramhall
- Nevill Road Infant School, Bramhall
- Nevill Road Junior School, Bramhall
- Norbury Hall Primary School, Hazel Grove
- Norris Bank Primary School, Heaton Norris
- North Cheshire Jewish Primary School, Heald Green
- Oak Tree Primary School, Cheadle Hulme
- Our Lady's RC Primary School, Edgeley
- Outwood Primary School, Heald Green
- Pownall Green Primary School, Bramhall
- Prospect Vale Primary School, Heald Green
- Queensgate Primary School, Bramhall
- Romiley Primary School, Romiley
- Rose Hill Primary School, Marple
- St Ambrose RC Primary School, Adswood
- St Bernadette's RC Primary School, Brinnington
- St Christopher's RC Primary School, Romiley
- St Elisabeth's CE Primary School, Reddish
- St George's CE Primary School, Heaviley
- St John's CE Primary School, Heaton Mersey
- St Joseph's RC Primary School, Reddish
- St Joseph's RC Primary School, Stockport
- St Mary's CE Primary School, South Reddish
- St Mary's RC Academy, Marple Bridge
- St Mary's RC Primary School, Heaton Norris
- St Matthew's CE Primary School, Edgeley
- St Paul's CE Primary School, Brinnington
- St Peter's RC Primary School, Hazel Grove
- St Philip's RC Primary School, Offerton
- St Simon's RC Primary School, Hazel Grove
- St Thomas' CE Primary School, Heaton Chapel
- St Thomas' CE Primary School, Stockport
- St Winifred's RC Primary School, Heaton Mersey
- Thorn Grove Primary School, Cheadle Hulme
- Tithe Barn Primary School, Heaton Mersey
- Torkington Primary School, Hazel Grove
- Vale View Primary School, North Reddish
- Vernon Park Primary School, Stockport
- Warren Wood Primary School, Offerton
- Westmorland Primary School, Brinnington
- Whitehill Primary School, Heaton Norris
- Woodford Primary School, Woodford
- Woodley Primary School, Woodley

=== Secondary schools ===
- Bramhall High School, Bramhall
- Cheadle Hulme High School, Cheadle Hulme
- Harrytown Catholic High School, Romiley
- Hazel Grove High School, Hazel Grove
- The Kingsway School, Cheadle
- Laurus Cheadle Hulme, Cheadle Hulme
- Marple Hall School, Marple
- Priestnall School, Heaton Mersey
- Reddish Vale High School, Reddish
- St Anne's RC Voluntary Academy, Heaton Chapel
- St James' RC High School, Cheadle Hulme
- Stockport Academy, Cheadle Heath
- Stockport School, Heaviley
- Werneth School, Romiley

=== Special and alternative schools ===
- Castle Hill High School, Offerton
- Heaton School, Heaton Moor
- Highfields College, Brinnington
- Lisburne School, Offerton
- Moat House, Heaton Norris
- Oakgrove School, Heald Green
- The Pendlebury Centre, Cheadle Heath
- Valley School, Bramhall
- Windlehurst School, Marple

=== Further education ===
- Aquinas College, Heaviley
- Marple Sixth Form College, Marple
- Stockport College, Stockport
- The Cheadle College, Cheadle Hulme

== Independent schools ==
=== Primary and preparatory schools ===
- Brabyns Preparatory School, Marple
- Greenbank School, Cheadle Hulme
- Lady Barn House School, Cheadle
- Stella Maris School, Heaton Mersey

=== Senior and all-through schools ===
- Cheadle Hulme School, Cheadle Hulme
- Covenant Christian School, Heaton Moor
- Hulme Hall Grammar School, Shaw Heath
- Stockport Grammar School, Heaviley

=== Special and alternative schools ===
- Acorns School, Marple
- Ashcroft School, Cheadle
- Bridge House School, Bredbury
- Broadstones School, Reddish
- Inscape House School, Cheadle
- North West Priory School, Cheadle
- Penarth Group School, Hazel Grove
- Progress Schools, Stockport
- Reddish Hall School, Reddish
- Royal School Manchester, Cheadle Hulme
- Willow House, Cheadle
