= Cheadle Royal =

Cheadle Royal may refer to:

- Cheadle Royal Hospital, Wilmslow Road, Cheadle, Stockport
- Cheadle Royal also describes the district of Cheadle containing the hospital, shopping centre, neighbouring residential areas and related business parks.
