= Listed buildings in Cheadle and Gatley =

Cheadle and Gatley are towns in the Metropolitan Borough of Stockport, Greater Manchester, England. The towns, together with the areas of Cheadle Hulme and Heald Green, contain 37 listed buildings that are recorded in the National Heritage List for England. Of these, one is listed at Grade I, the highest of the three grades, two are at Grade II*, the middle grade, and the others are at Grade II, the lowest grade. The area is largely residential, most of the listed buildings are houses and associated structures, and the other listed buildings include churches and items in churchyards, a public house, two hospitals, a school, a railway viaduct, a memorial fountain, and four war memorials.

== Key ==
Grade	Criteria
I	Buildings of exceptional interest, sometimes considered to be internationally important
II*	Particularly important buildings of more than special interest
II	Buildings of national importance and special interest

== Buildings ==
Name and location	Photograph	Date	Notes	Grade
Sundial; 53.39442°N 2.21723°W		Medieval	The sundial, converted from a cross shaft, is in the churchyard of St Mary's Church. It has a large shaped base and a square shaft with chamfered corners. On the top is a copper dial and an ornate gnomon.	II
Cross; 53.39406°N 2.21760°W		Late 14th to 15th century	The cross is in the churchyard of St Mary's Church and is in red sandstone. The cross consists of a square shaft with chamfered corners on a moulded base. On each face is a niche with a hood mould, and on the base is a copper commemorative plate dated 1873.	II
St Mary's Church, Cheadle; 53.39420°N 2.21754°W		16th century	The church was rebuilt and restored in 1859–62, and restored again in 1878–80 by J. Medland Taylor. It is in stone with a stone-slate roof, and is in Perpendicular style. The church consists of a nave with a clerestory, north and south aisles with chapels, a south porch, a chancel with a north vestry, and a west tower. The tower has three stages, diagonal buttresses, a clock face, and an embattled parapet with gargoyles. The porch has crocketed pinnacles and the doorway has a Tudor arched head.	I
1 Higham Street; 53.37091°N 2.19211°W	—	17th century	A timber framed house on a stone plinth with a stone-slate roof. There are two storeys, two bays, and a lean-to on the right. The windows are replacement casements, and inside the house are timber framed partitions.	II
Depleach Hall; 53.39180°N 2.21629°W	—	17th century	Originally a tithe barn, later used for other purposes, it is cruck framed on a sandstone plinth, with rendered walls and a slate roof. There is one storey and three bays. The gables have ornate pierced bargeboards, and inside are two closed cruck trusses.	II
Hulme Hall; 53.37157°N 2.19286°W	—	17th century	Originally a timber framed house on a stone plinth, it was restored and considerably extended in brick in the 19th century. It has slate roofs and two storeys. The original part has a jettied upper floor and gables, and the gables have bargeboards and finials. Some of the windows are mullioned and transomed, and others are replacements.	II
Stanley Hall; 53.35807°N 2.20966°W	—	1662	A farmhouse, later a private house, timber framed on a stone plinth with a slate roof. It has three bays, and had two storeys with a floor later removed. The doorway has a moulded surround and a dated lintel. Some of the windows are casements, and others are mullioned with moulded surrounds.	II
Manor House; 53.39581°N 2.21323°W		1664	A timber framed house on a brick plinth with a slate roof, and a brick extension. There are two storeys, two bays, and a single storey rear extension. The gable is jettied. Inside the house are timber framed partitions, an inglenook and a bressumer.	II
Moseley Old Hall; 53.39681°N 2.20568°W		1666	A timber framed house on a stone plinth with a tile roof, it has two storeys. and three bays consisting of a hall and cross-wings, all with gables. The windows are mullioned, those on the ground floor being replacements. To the left of the middle bay is a porch and a doorway with a moulded surround. Inside the house are an inglenook and a bressumer.	II*
John Millington public house 53.37414°N 2.18564°W		Late 17th century	A house, later used for other purposes, now a public house, it is in brick with stone dressings, a band, quoins and a stone-slate roof. There are two storeys with attics, and fronts of three and two bays. The entrance is in the gable end, and this is flanked by mullioned windows. The right front contains a bay window, a casement window, a mullioned and transomed window, and a dormer window.	II
South View; 53.38192°N 2.21965°W	—	Late 17th or early 18th century	A house and weaver's cottage, extended by four bays in the 19th century and by another four bays in the 20th century, and since used for other purposes. It is in brick with a slate roof and has two storeys and a basement. Most of the windows are mullioned, some were workshop windows, and some have been blocked. On the front are 19th-century canted bay windows, one with two storeys and the other with one.	II
Cheadle Wood Farmhouse; 53.40343°N 2.21171°W	—	Mid-18th century	A brick farmhouse with a stone-slate roof, it has three storeys, four bays, and a later rear wing. There is a recessed porch in the left gable end, and most of the windows are 20th-century casements.	II
Gatley Hall; 53.39420°N 2.23387°W	—	Mid-18th century	A brick house with stone dressings, a dentilled eaves cornice, and a hipped slate roof. There are two storeys, a double-depth plan, four bays, and a three-bay rear wing. The doorway has ¾ columns, an open pediment and a fanlight. The windows on the front are sashes, at the rear is an arched stair window, and the rear wing contains casement windows.	II
Ladybridge Farmhouse; 53.38056°N 2.18546°W	—	1764	The farmhouse is in brick, partly rendered and partly tile-hung, with a stone-slate roof. It has two storeys, two bays, and a lean-to on the left. The doorway has a segmental arch and a keystone. The windows are mullioned and transomed, they contain casements and have keystones.	II
Belmont; 53.38460°N 2.21368°W	—	Late 18th century	The house, which has been extended, is in stuccoed brick on a plinth, with vermiculated quoins, a modillion eaves cornice and a slate roof. There are two storeys, the main block has a symmetrical front of five bays, flanked by pavilion bays with triangular pediments, and with a former service wing to the west. In the centre is a doorway with a moulded architrave, an arched fanlight, and a keystone, over which is a small semicircular balcony. This is flanked by full-height bow windows, and the other windows are sashes.	II
George and Dragon Hotel; 53.39511°N 2.21328°W		Late 18th century	A public house in rendered brick on a stone plinth, with a bracketed eaves cornice and a slate roof. There are three storeys and five bays. In the first bay is a carriage entry with a segmental arch and a keystone. The fourth bay contains a doorway with paired Ionic columns and a canopy, and in the fifth bay is a canted bay window. The other windows are sashes, and at the rear is a round-headed stair window.	II
Giffin Farmhouse; 53.36308°N 2.21571°W	—	Late 18th century	A brick farmhouse with a 20th-century tile roof, two storeys, three bays, and lean-to extensions on the left and at the rear. The middle bay projects lightly, and contains a round-arched recessed porch with impost blocks and a keystone. The windows are sashes with keystones.	II
Hawbank House; 53.39551°N 2.21347°W		Late 18th century	A house that was considerably extended in 1984 and used as offices. It is in brick on a stone plinth, with stone dressings, a modillion eaves cornice, and a hipped slate roof. There are two storeys, an entrance of three bays flanked by three-bay wings. The middle bay projects slightly and is pedimented. It contains a doorway with side panels and a semi-elliptical radial fanlight. The windows are sashes.	II
Crosier family chest tomb 53.39433°N 2.21754°W		1780	The chest tomb to the memory of members of the Crozier family is in the churchyard of St Mary's Church. It is in stone and consists of an inscribed slab with canted corners on diagonally set scrolls standing on a plinth.	II
Hartdale House; 53.39771°N 2.21941°W	—	Early 19th century	A house, later offices, in brick on a stone plinth, with a modillioned eaves cornice and a hipped slate roof. It has two storeys, three bays, and a later two-bay wing to the left. The doorway is recessed, with fluted Ionic ¾ columns, and a radial fanlight, and the windows are sashes.	II
Milestone, Daylesford Road; 53.38401°N 2.21510°W	—	Early 19th century	The milestone is in sandstone with a brick support at the base. It consists of a triangular shaft with "Cheadle" on the top and on the side are inscribed the distances in miles to St Anne's Square, Manchester and to Wilmslow.	II
Newlands House; 53.39594°N 2.21250°W		Early 19th century	A brick house on a stone plinth, with an eaves cornice and a hipped slate roof. There are two storeys and three bays, with later extensions at the rear. The central doorway is recessed with a semi-elliptical arch and a radial fanlight, and the windows are sashes.	II
Seven Arches railway viaduct 53.38100°N 2.18284°W		1842	The viaduct was built by the Manchester and Birmingham Railway to carry its line over the valley of the Micker Brook. It is in brick with stone dressings and consists of seven semicircular arches on square piers. The viaduct has a springing band and a parapet with a band and coping.	II
Abney Hall; 53.39974°N 2.21266°W		1847	A large country house, later offices, the original part being in Neo-Norman style, with substantial alterations and extensions in 1849 and 1893 in Tudor Revival style. The house has an irregular plan, and is in brick with sandstone dressings and a slate roof. It is mainly in two storeys with attics, and the 1894 extension has a single storey and five bays. The doorway has a decorative Neo-Norman portal, above which is arcading, a Neo-Norman niche, and a coped gable. This is flanked by bays with mullioned and transomed windows, hood moulds, niches, and coped gables with pinnacles. At the rear are seven gables, bay windows of different types, a two-storey bow window, gargoyles and weathervanes.	II*
Cheadle Royal Hospital, main wing 53.37493°N 2.22096°W	—	1848–49	The hospital was designed by Richard Lane in Jacobean style. It is in red brick with sandstone dressings and Welsh slate roofs. Originally it had an E-shaped plan, and was later extended at the rear to form courtyards. The entrance front is symmetrical with a central block of three storeys with a basement, three bays, and a Tudor arched entrance. This is flanked by three-storey wings with 14 bays each, some with canted bay windows, and some with gables. The rear cross-wing has shaped gables, and includes an archway with an oriel window above and a cupola. Behind the entrance block is a chapel.	II
Walls of walled garden, Abney Hall; 53.40088°N 2.21168°W	—	1850s	The walls enclose the four sides of the garden, they are about 4 metres (13 ft) tall, and are in brick with buttresses and stone coping. The northwest gateway has a four-centred arch, a gabled clock tower, mullioned windows, coped parapets, and an ornate finial. Each of the other three gateways has a four-centred arch, buttresses, and a coped gable. At a corner is an octagonal ventilation shaft with a Gothic pinnacle.	II
Cheadle Hulme School; 53.36851°N 2.19604°W		1869	The school was extended in 1899, in 1903 and later in the 20th century. It is in red brick with sandstone dressings, decoration in moulded red and blue brick, and a Welsh slate roof. There are two storeys with attics and basements, and a front of 21 bays. The entrance is approached by a double flight of steps, it has an arched doorway, and above is an oriel window. In the flanking bays are three-bay sections that are projecting and gabled, and there is a five-stage tower with a slender spire.	II
Barnes Hospital; 53.39720°N 2.22352°W		1871–75	A convalescent hospital, later extended, it is in French Gothic style. The hospital is built in red brick with dressings in stone, blue brick, and terracotta, and roofs in Welsh slate with decorative ridge tiles. It has a cruciform plan, and is mainly in two storeys. In the centre is an office block, with accommodation for patients and services in the wings. There is a four-stage tower with angle buttresses, clock faces, and a two-stage lantern surmounted by a crown.	II
3 High Street; 53.39510°N 2.21344°W		Late 19th century	Originally a café and baker's shop, it was remodelled in Art Deco style in the 1930s. It is in stuccoed brick, it has a tile-hung gable with bargeboards, and a slate roof. On the ground floor is a shop front, and on the upper floor is a canted oriel window, both in Art Deco style. Inside there are café rooms, also in Art Deco style.	II
St James' Church, Gatley; 53.39108°N 2.23721°W		1880–81	The church was designed by J. Medland and Harry Taylor, and the choir vestry was added in 1904–05. It is in speckled brick with dressings in red brick, and has roofs of green and grey slate. The church consists of a nave with a west polygonal apsidal baptistry, a canted chancel with north and south vestries, and a southwest tower. The tower incorporates a porch, and has three stages, an external staircase, and a saddleback roof containing a gabled dormer.	II
Conservatory at Cringle; 53.38286°N 2.21767°W	—	1882	The conservatory is in glass on a brick plinth and with a timber structure. It has a T-shaped plan: in the canted stem of the T is a semicircular-headed doorway with colonnettes and a keystone. The head of the T has five bays separated by pilasters and contains leaded lights, some painted. There is a timber eaves cornice, a decorative clerestory, and a pierced ridge board with terminating finials.	II
Lychgate; 53.39424°N 2.21690°W		1883	The lychgate is at the entrance to the churchyard of St Mary's Church. It has an ashlar plinth, a timber frame, and a stone-slate roof. There are three timber posts on each side, and an inscribed wall plate. The gates have vertical battens and cast iron hinges and spikes.	II
Ockleston Memorial Fountain; 53.39514°N 2.21079°W		1889	A drinking fountain with an octagonal sandstone trough and a small drinking bowl with a gablet. From this rises a circular column in polished granite with a decorative base and capital, carrying an inscription and heraldic shields. On the top is a cast iron weathervane.	II
Cheadle Hulme war memorial 53.37199°N 2.18205°W		1921	The war memorial stands near a road junction. It consists of an inscribed granite plinth, a sandstone square tapering shaft surmounted by a cross. On two sides of the shaft are bronze plaques depicting a serviceman in battledress.	II
Gatley war memorial 53.39280°N 2.23504°W		1921	The war memorial stands at a road junction. It is in ashlar stone, and consists of a two-stage tapering square shaft on a plinth. The lower stage has a dentilled cornice, and in the upper stage are clock faces with hood moulds.	II
Cheadle war memorial 53.37148°N 2.21284°W		1920s (probable)	The war memorial is in white granite and has a chamfered plinth and a pedestal. On this stands a rough-hewn rock-faced column in the shape of an obelisk. On the pedestal are bronze plaques with inscriptions and the names of the military personnel lost in both World Wars, and the names of civilians killed in air raids in the town during the Second World War. The memorial is surrounded by a fence of granite posts and chains.	II
Long Lane war memorial 53.37148°N 2.21646°W		1920s (probable)	The war memorial consists of seven blocks of sandstone, diminishing in size to form an obelisk. The two lowest blocks form a plinth. and the block below the top has a carved wreath. The blocks below carry inscriptions and the names of those lost in the two World Wars. The obelisk is flanked by low brick walls with sandstone slabs on the sides and top; these contain wreaths and dates.	II
