= George and Dragon, Cheadle =

Listed pub in Greater Manchester, England

George and Dragon
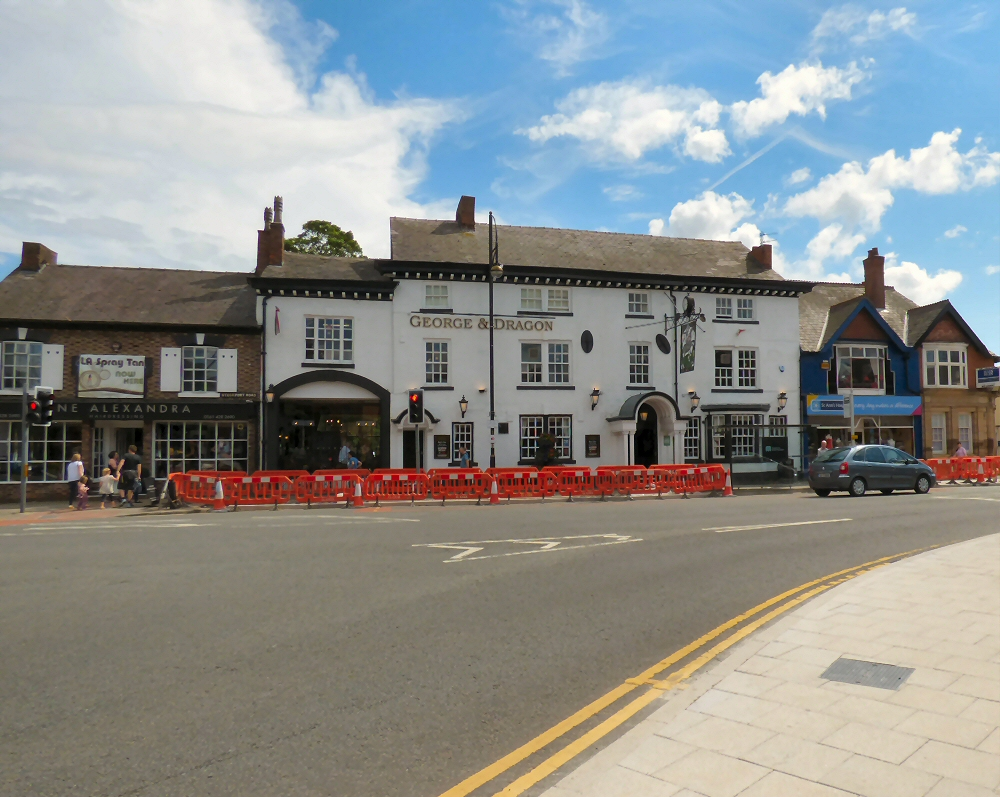
- The pub in 2015

- Location within Greater Manchester
- Alternative names: George and Dragon Hotel

General information
- Type: Public house
- Location: 1 High Street, Cheadle, Greater Manchester, England
- Coordinates: 53.3951°N 2.2132°W
- Year built: Late 18th century
- Renovated: 2014
- Owner: Amber Taverns

Design and construction
- Designations

Listed Building – Grade II
- Official name: George and Dragon Hotel
- Designated: 11 October 1985
- Reference no.: 1241728

Website
- Official website

The George and Dragon is a Grade II listed public house on High Street in Cheadle, a suburban village within the Metropolitan Borough of Stockport, Greater Manchester, England. Built in the late 18th century, it has had various ownerships and associations over time, including a period linked with Greenall's. After a five‑year closure, it reopened in September 2014 following refurbishment by Amber Taverns, who continue to own the freehold.

== History ==
The building was constructed in the late 18th century, according to its official listing. The 1922 Ordnance Survey map shows the building as a hotel without a name, while the 1936 edition records it as a public house. On 11 October 1985, the George and Dragon was designated a Grade II listed building.

According to the Campaign for Real Ale (CAMRA), the pub was formerly associated with Greenall's, although their records do not indicate when this period of ownership took place. The building reopened in September 2014 after a five‑year closure, having undergone a wide‑ranging renovation by Amber Taverns, who remain the freehold owners.

== Architecture ==
=== Exterior ===
The building is finished in painted roughcast over brick and has a slate roof. It has five bays and three storeys, with a carriage entrance occupying the first bay. The front stands on a stone base and has a deep, bracketed eaves line from the late 19th century, along with a steep roof. The carriage entrance is set beneath an arched opening with a keystone, and there is a three‑part sash window directly above it. The main doorway is in the fourth bay and is sheltered by a late 19th‑century canopy supported by paired Ionic columns. The fifth bay contains a canted bay window.

Elsewhere on the front, the window pattern alternates between single and paired sashes, giving a total of seven single windows and five paired ones; two of the paired examples lack glazing bars. The windows on the lower two floors have keystones formed of three parts. The rear has been heavily altered but still includes a tall, round‑headed stair window. The interior has also been extensively changed.

=== Interior ===
The former carriage entrance has been brought into the main interior and enclosed with glazing at the front and back. The bar is positioned centrally, with the area to the right used mainly for standing drinkers.

== See also ==
- Listed buildings in Cheadle and Gatley
- Listed pubs in Greater Manchester
