= Cheadle Hulme =

Suburb of Stockport, Greater Manchester, England

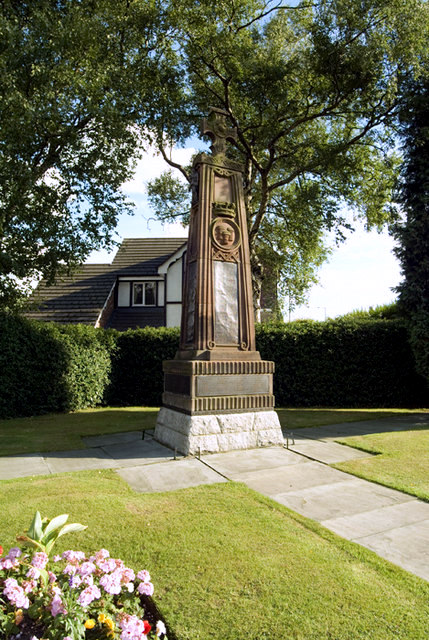
- The cenotaph, on the corner of Ravenoak Road and Manor Road in 2005

- Location within the United Kingdom
- Area: 8.37 km^{2} (3.23 sq mi)
- Population: 26,479 (2011)
  - Density: 3,164/km^{2} (8,190/sq mi)
- OS grid reference: SJ872870
  - London: 157 mi (253 km) SE
- Metropolitan borough: Stockport
- Metropolitan county: Greater Manchester
- Country: England
- Sovereign state: United Kingdom
- Post town: CHEADLE
- Postcode district: SK8
- Dialling code: 0161
- UK Parliament: Cheadle

Cheadle Hulme (/ˌtʃiːdəl ˈhjuːm/) is a suburb in the Metropolitan Borough of Stockport, Greater Manchester, England. It lies in the historic county of Cheshire, 2 miles (3.2 km) south-west of Stockport and 8 miles (12.9 km) south-east of Manchester. In 2011, it had a population of 26,479. The suburb has good transport links, with its own railway station and is in close proximity to Manchester Airport, the M60 motorway and the A34 road.

Evidence of Bronze Age, Roman and Anglo-Saxon activity, including coins, jewellery and axes, have been discovered locally. The area was first mentioned in the Domesday Book of 1086 when it was a large estate which included neighbouring Cheadle. In the early 14th century, it was split into southern and northern parts at about the future locations of Cheadle Hulme and Cheadle respectively. The area was acquired by the Moseley family in the 17th century and became known as Cheadle Moseley. Unlike many English villages, it did not grow around a church; instead it formed from several hamlets, many of which retain their names as neighbourhoods within Cheadle Hulme. In the late 19th century, Cheadle Hulme was united with Cheadle, Gatley and other neighbouring places to form the urban district of Cheadle and Gatley. This district was abolished in 1974 and Cheadle Hulme became a part of the Metropolitan Borough of Stockport.

== History ==
=== Early history ===
The Domesday Book provides the earliest mention of the area, where it is recorded as "Cedde", Celtic for "wood". Local archaeological finds include Bronze Age axes discovered in Cheadle. Evidence of Roman occupation includes coins and jewellery, which were found in 1972, and the modern-day Cheadle Road, originally known as Street Lane, may be of Roman origin. A stone cross dedicated to the Anglo-Saxon St Chad, uncovered in 1873, indicates Anglo-Saxon activity. The cross was found in an area called "Chad Hill", on the banks of Micker Brook near its confluence with the River Mersey; this area became "Chedle". Suggestions for the origin of the name include the words cedde, and leigh or leah, in Old English meaning "clearing", forming the modern day "Cheadle". "Hulme" may have been derived from the Old Norse word for "water meadow" or "island in the fen".

According to the Domesday Book in 1086, the modern-day Cheadle and Cheadle Hulme were a single large estate. Valued at £20, it was described as "large and important" and "a wood three leagues (Note: About 9 miles (14 km).) long and half as broad". One of the earliest owners of the property was the Earl of Chester. It was held by a Gamel, a free Saxon, under Hugh d'Avranches, 1st Earl of Chester, and later became the property of the de Chedle family, who took their name from the land they owned. By June 1294, Geoffrey de Chedle was Lord of the manor. Geoffrey's descendant Robert (or Roger) died in the early 1320s, leaving the estate to his wife Matilda who held it until her death in 1326. As there were no male heirs the manor, which was now worth £30 per annum, was divided between her daughters, Clemence and Agnes. Clemence inherited the southern half (which would later become the modern-day Cheadle Hulme), and Agnes inherited the northern half (latterly Cheadle). The two areas became known as "Chedle Holme" and "Chedle Bulkeley" respectively. Shortly afterwards the Chedle Holme estate was divided and the part where Hulme Hall is now situated became known as "Holme", and held by the Vernons. The estates were reunified on the death of the last of the Vernons in 1476.

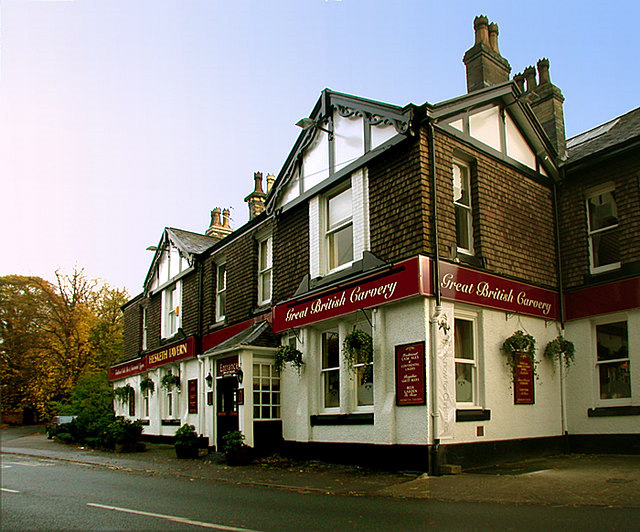
The Hesketh Tavern, on Hulme Hall Road, was a public house. It was built on the site of another pub, the Horse & Jockey, in 1864 and named after the family who once owned the manor.

The only daughter of Clemence and William de Bagulegh, Isabel de Bagulegh, succeeded her parents as owner of the manor, and married Sir Thomas Danyers. Danyers was rewarded for his efforts in the crusades through an annual payment from the King of 40 marks, as well as the gift of Lyme Hall. His daughter Margaret continued to receive payments after his death.

The first John Savage succeeded Margaret and nine more followed him. The tenth died young, so the estate passed to his brother, Thomas Savage. In 1626, Charles I created the title of Viscount Savage for him. On his death, the estate passed to his daughter Joan, who later married John Paulet, 5th Marquess of Winchester. Joan died during childbirth at the age of 23 and the estate passed to the Marquess. The Marquess practised Catholicism, and in 1643 the estate was confiscated due to persecution of Catholics in the English Civil War.

Following this, the estate was acquired by the Moseley family of Manchester and became known as Cheadle Moseley. Anne Moseley was the last of this family to hold the manor, as her husband could not afford to keep it following her death. It was purchased by John Davenport, who bequeathed it to the Bamford family when he died childless in 1760. After the last Bamford died without male issue in 1806, the estate passed to Robert Hesketh who took the name Bamford-Hesketh; it is from this family that the Hesketh Tavern public house in Cheadle Hulme got its name. The last person to hold the manor was Winifred, Countess of Dundonald, one of Bamford-Hesketh's descendants.

=== Modern history ===
Prior to 1868, Cheadle Moseley was a township within the ancient parish of Cheadle. Its population more than doubled during the first half of the 19th century, rising from 971 in 1801 to 2,319 in 1851. Cheadle Moseley became a civil parish in 1868. In 1879, it was merged with neighbouring Cheadle Bulkeley to form the civil parish of Cheadle. Cheadle parish went on to become part of the newly formed Cheadle and Gatley district in 1894. The name "Cheadle Moseley" continued to be used for the area, appearing on tithes and deeds until the 20th century. In 1974, the Cheadle and Gatley district was abolished and Cheadle Hulme became part of the Metropolitan Borough of Stockport.

RAF Handforth was a large and important storage facility that contributed directly to the war effort. The site stretched from the centre of Handforth, through Cheadle Hulme and onwards to Woodford. The industrial estate in Adlington Park in Poynton was a dispersed site of RAF Handforth. Cheadle Hulme itself escaped being badly damaged, but its villagers knew the extent of the war, mainly due to the large and visible presence of the RAF and could hear the sounds of air-raids on Manchester.

Cheadle Hulme did not grow around a church like many English villages, but instead grew from several hamlets that existed in the area. Many of the names of these hamlets still appear in the names of areas, including Smithy Green, Lane End, Gill Bent and Grove Lane. Some of the many farms, such as Orish Mere and Hursthead Farms, which covered the area also retain their names in schools that were built in their place.

The area was struck by an F1/T2 tornado on 23 November 1981, as part of the record-breaking nationwide tornado outbreak on that day.

== Governance ==
Cheadle Hulme was historically part of the ancient parish of Cheadle within the historic county boundaries of Cheshire. It formed the township of Cheadle Moseley. Following the Municipal Corporations Act 1835, part of Cheadle Moseley was amalgamated into the Municipal Borough of Stockport. Cheadle Moseley became a separate civil parish in 1866, but in 1879 it was united with the neighbouring civil parish of Cheadle Bulkeley to form the civil parish of Cheadle.

Established in 1886, Cheadle Hulme's first local authority was the Cheadle and Gatley local board of health, a regulatory body responsible for standards of hygiene and sanitation for the area of Stockport Etchells township and the part of Cheadle township outside the Municipal Borough of Stockport. The board of health was also part of Stockport poor law union. In 1888, the board was divided into four wards: Adswood, Cheadle, Cheadle Hulme and Gatley. Under the Local Government Act 1894 the area of the local board became Cheadle and Gatley Urban District.

There were exchanges of land with the neighbouring urban districts of Wilmslow and Handforth in 1901, and the wards were restructured again, splitting Cheadle Hulme into north and south, and merging in Adswood. Due to the fast-paced growth of the district, the wards were again restructured in 1930, with the addition of Heald Green. In 1940, the current wards of Adswood, Cheadle East, Cheadle West, Cheadle Hulme North, Cheadle Hulme South, Gatley and Heald Green were established. Under the Local Government Act 1972, the Cheadle and Gatley Urban District was abolished, and Cheadle Hulme has, since 1 April 1974, formed an unparished area of the Metropolitan Borough of Stockport within the metropolitan county of Greater Manchester.

Since 1950, Cheadle Hulme has been part of the Cheadle parliamentary constituency. It has been represented by Liberal Democrat Tom Morrison since 2024.

== Geography ==
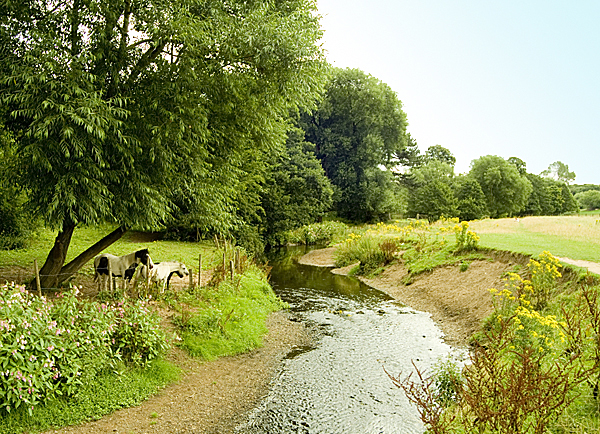
The Micker Brook, running through fields behind the Ramillies estate in 2005

At 53.376°N 2.188°W, Cheadle Hulme is in the south of Greater Manchester. Stockport Metropolitan Borough straddles the Cheshire Plain and the Pennines, and Cheadle Hulme is in the west of the borough on the Cheshire Plain. The area lies in the Ladybrook Valley next to the Micker Brook, a tributary of the river Mersey which flows north–west from Poynton through Bramhall and Cheadle Hulme, joining the Mersey in Stockport.

The majority of buildings in the area are houses from the 20th century, but there are a few buildings, landmarks and objects that date from the 16th century, in addition to Bramall Hall which dates from the 14th century. In particular, there are many Victorian buildings in several places across the area. The local drift geology is mostly glacial boulder clay, as well as glacial sands and gravel. For many years the clay has been used for making bricks and tiles.

Cheadle Hulme's climate is generally temperate, like the rest of Greater Manchester. The mean highest and lowest temperatures of 13.2 °C (55.8 °F) and 6.4 °C (43.5 °F) are slightly above the average for England, while the annual rainfall of 806.6 millimetres (31.76 in) and average hours (1,394.5 hours) of sunshine are respectively above and below the national averages.

== Demography ==
Cheadle Hulme compared
2011 UK census	Cheadle Hulme (Note: Cheadle Hulme is split into two areas for censuses, Cheadle Hulme North and Cheadle Hulme South. The figures below before 2011 account for both areas. From 2011 the numbers are based on the data for the Cheadle Hulme Built-up area sub division as published by the Office for National Statistics. The data for this area do not match the combined total for the Cheadle North and South wards as the boundaries for this sub-division are slightly different.)	Stockport (borough)	England
Total population	24,362	283,275	53,012,456
White	91.6%	92.1%	85.4%
Asian	5.5%	4.9%	7.8%
Mixed	1.5%	1.8%	2.3%
Black	0.6%	0.7%	3.5%
Other	0.8%	0.6%	1.0%

According to the Office for National Statistics, Cheadle Hulme had a population of 24,362 at the 2011 census. The population density was 4,152 inhabitants per square kilometre (10,754/sq mi), with a 100–95.3 female-to-male ratio. Of those aged over 16, 25.0% were single (never married or registered a same-sex civil partnership), 58.1% married and 0.1% in a registered same-sex civil partnership Cheadle Hulme's 9,962 households included 26.1% one-person, 42.9% Married or same-sex civil partnership couples living together, 6.2% were co-habiting couples and 8.3% single parents with children. Of those aged 16–74, 13.1% had no academic qualifications.

About 66.6% of Cheadle Hulme's residents reported themselves as being Christian, 3.4% Muslim, 1.2% Hindu, 0.6% Jewish, 0.3% Buddhist and 0.1% Sikh. The census recorded 21.1% as having no religion, 0.4% had an alternative religion and 6.3% did not state their religion.

Population growth in Cheadle Moseley (from 1664 to 1971)
Year	1664	1801	1811	1821	1831	1841	1851	1861	1871	1891	1901	1911	1921	1931	1939	1951	1961	1971
Population	390	971	1,296	1,534	1,946	2,288	2,319	2,329	2,612	8,252	7,916	9,913	11,036	18,473	32,245	31,511	45,621	60,807
Urban District 1981–1971

Population growth in Cheadle and Gatley (including Cheadle Hulme) from 1891 to 2001
Year	1981	1991	2001
Population	59,828	58,457	57,507
Urban Subdivision 1981–2001

Population growth in Cheadle Hulme (north and south) from 2011
Year	2011
Population	24,362
• Cheadle Hulme Built-up area sub division 2011

== Economy ==
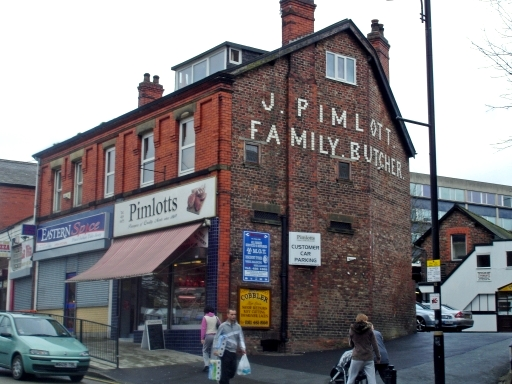
Pimlott's butcher shop in 2007, on Station Road. It was established in 1869 and is one of the family-run businesses in the area.

For many years, Cheadle Hulme was rural countryside, made up of woods, open land and farms. The local population was made up of farmers and peasants, living in small cottages and working the land under the tenancy of the Lord of the manor. Most families kept animals for food, grew their own crops, and probably bought and sold produce at Stockport market. Water was obtained from local wells and ponds, and sometimes the Micker Brook.

Local silk weaving became a large part of everyday life. The work took place in domestic cottages in a room known as a "loomshop", and the woven silk was transported to firms in Macclesfield 8 miles (13 km) away. Silk-weaving remained commonplace in the area until the early 20th century, when the process became industrialised. Other industries in the area included a corn mill, which collapsed some time during the First World War, located next to the Micker Brook; cotton weaving; and brickworks, one located where the fire station is and one near to the railway station. A coal wharf was situated opposite the railway station and supplied the area with coal.

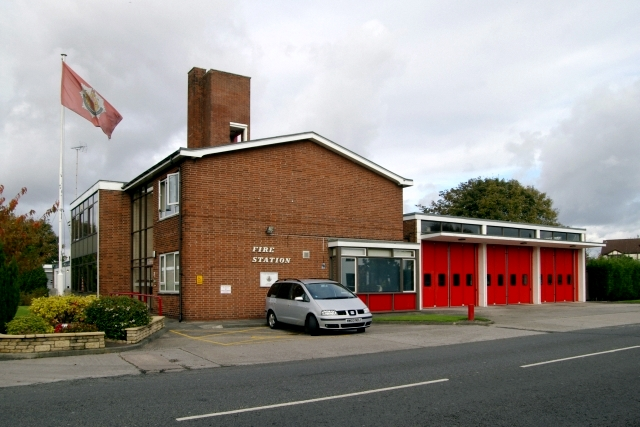
Cheadle Hulme Fire Station on Turves Road, built in 1960. The site also incorporates an ambulance station.

The building of the railways in the early 1840s introduced new employment opportunities for people in places such as Stockport and Manchester, as well as an influx of people coming to live in the area. In the mid-19th century, one of the earliest shops was opened in the Smithy Green area, selling groceries, sweets and other provisions. As people settled in the area, more shops were opened and new houses were built, many of which still stand. During the early 20th century Cheadle Hulme experienced a rapid growth in population, mostly due to an influx of people from Manchester and other large towns and cities coming to live in the area, and it gradually became more suburban.

In the 1930s more houses were built around the Grove Lane and Pingate Lane, Gill Bent Road, Hulme Hall Road and Cheadle Road areas, and new roads replaced old farms. In the 1960s, the Hursthead estate was built on land that was once Hursthead Farm. By 2009, the only farm remaining was Leather's Farm on Ladybridge Road.

Cheadle Hulme is served by a fire station on Turves Road which opened in October 1960. Before this the area made use of a service in Cheadle. An ambulance station is near the fire station, and the closest public hospital is Stepping Hill Hospital, in Hazel Grove. Until the early 2000s, the area had a police station which served as the headquarters for the west Stockport area. The building, which opened in 1912, was sold in 2006 and converted into flats.

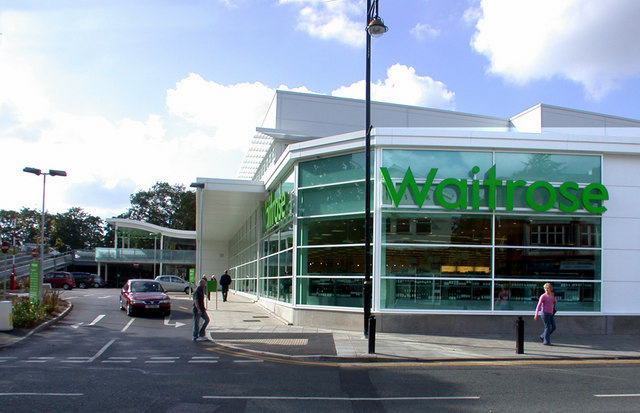
Waitrose, on Station Road. It was built in 2007 on the site of a former office block, and was the grocer's first purpose-built retail outlet in northern England.

Cheadle Hulme has a large variety of businesses serving the area. Station Road is home to the shopping precinct, built in 1962, and contains among other businesses an Oxfam shop, an Asda supermarket, a hairdressing salon, an optician, a pharmacy, some clothing retailers and several restaurants. There are more restaurants and cafés along Station Road, as well as solicitors and building societies, and long-running family businesses such as Pimlott's butchers are also prominent. In 2002, a Tesco Express opened on the site of an old petrol station and, in July 2007, Cheadle Hulme became the home of Waitrose's first purpose-built retail outlet in northern England.

According to the 2001 census, the biggest industry of employment for Cheadle Hulme residents is that of wholesale and retail trade and repairs with approximately 16% of people employed in that industry. This is followed closely by real estate, renting and business activities with 15% of people employed in this area. Other big areas of employment include manufacturing (13%), health and social work (11%) and education (10%). Approximately 30% of people were classed as "economically inactive" in the 2001 census. This included retired people, people who had to look after their family, and disabled or sick people.

== Landmarks ==
The Swann Lane, Hulme Hall Road and Hill Top Avenue conservation area contains 16th and 17th century timber-framed buildings, Victorian villas, churches and some former farmsteads. There are two Grade II listed buildings in this area: Hulme Hall, a timber-framed manor house which dates from either the 16th or 17th century, and 1 Higham Street, formerly Hill Cottage, which is of a similar period and style to Hulme Hall. The Church Inn public house, which dates from either the late 18th or early 19th century, is situated on the edge of this area.

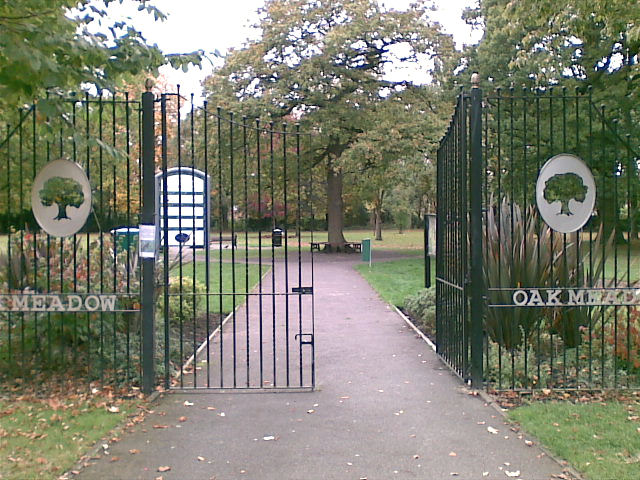
The entrance to Oak Meadow Park, 2009

Oak Meadow Park is a small park on Station Road, with a large grass area and woodland. In the early 2000s it was renovated and refurbished, with new fences, benches and footpaths. The project to maintain and improve the park is a continuous process overseen by a local volunteer group. The park is used for special community events throughout the year.

Bruntwood Park has a variety of facilities, including orienteering, an 18-hole, par three pitch and putt golf course, children's play areas, football pitche, and a BMX track. It is also home to The Bowmen of Bruntwood, an archery club. It is a Grade B Site of Biological Interest, and in 1999 was given a Green Flag Award for its high standards. The land it occupies was once a large estate, which at one time included a stud farm. Bruntwood Hall, a Victorian Gothic building constructed in 1861, has been used for various purposes, including serving as Cheadle and Gatley Town Hall from 1944 until 1959. It is now a hotel and, since the 1940s, the park has been open to the public.

Around 300 men from Cheadle Hulme served in the First World War, and it was decided that those who died should be commemorated. Various ideas, including a library and clock tower, were suggested and in the end a cenotaph was built on the corner of Ravenoak Road and Manor Road in 1921. It was designed by British architect Arthur Beresford Pite and created by sculptor Benjamin Clemens. Additions for later wars have been made.

== Transport ==
=== Roads ===
Although most of the roads in the area date from the 20th century, there are many older roads formed from ancient routes. Cheadle Road possibly originated in Roman times and Ack Lane (formerly Hack Lane) is named after Hacon, a local Saxon landowner. Hulme Hall Road is named for the landmark it runs through and has existed since at least the 18th century. Until the 20th century, the roads were little more than country lanes and most traffic consisted of horsedrawn carriages, carts and milk floats. The roads were about half as wide as they are currently and have all since been widened to accommodate the increasing amount of traffic. The first cars appeared in Cheadle Hulme in the early 1900s, but horse-drawn vehicles were the main form of transport until the 1920s. A bus, known as the Rattler, was introduced around this time and ran a service through the area. It was, however, very slow and noisy, as its name suggests.

The A34 Cheadle by-pass passes nearby; the A5419 and B5095 roads traverse Cheadle Hulme.

=== Railway ===
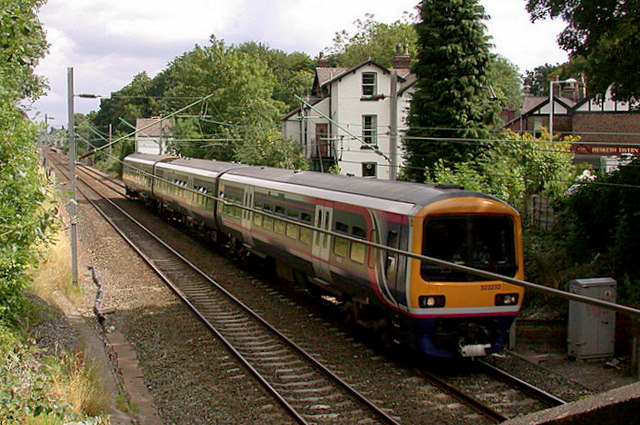
A train leaving Cheadle Hulme, heading south towards Handforth, 2007

The Crewe to Manchester railway was completed in May 1842 and a railway station known as Cheadle was built opposite the modern-day Hesketh Tavern. When the Stafford to Manchester railway opened in 1845, the original station closed and the present Cheadle Hulme railway station was built to accommodate the junction between the two railways. The road was renamed Station Road in the same year and the station was renamed Cheadle Hulme in 1866.

The station has four platforms: two that serve the Crewe to Manchester line and the other two for the Stafford to Manchester line. There are three trains per hour northbound to Stockport and Manchester Piccadilly, with one train per hour southbound to each of Stoke-on-Trent, Alderley Edge and Crewe.

=== Buses ===
Cheadle Hulme is well served by bus routes, which are operated predominantly by Stagecoach Manchester, under contract to the Bee Network. There are frequent services to and from Stockport and Manchester Piccadilly Gardens, as well as to Bramhall, Cheadle, Grove Lane, Wythenshawe Hospital and Manchester Airport.

=== Air ===
Cheadle Hulme is situated close to Manchester Airport.

== Education ==
Cheadle Hulme's first school, established in 1785, was named after local grocer Jonathan Robinson, who donated 3 acres (1.2 ha) of land on what is now Woods Lane. The school was built on what is now the corner of Woods Lane and Church Road, and was originally for the teaching of four boys and four girls. With the increasing population and the Education Act 1870 All Saints' National School was built across the road in 1873, next to All Saints' Church from which it took its name.

Other schools established in the 19th century include the

- Grove Lane Baptist Day School, built in 1846
- Cheadle Hulme School in 1855;
- the Congregational Church School in the same year;
- Ramillies Hall School in 1884.

Hulme Hall Grammar School was established in 1928 (has since relocated), Queens Road Primary School opened in 1932, and the school that became Cheadle Hulme High School was built near to the site of the Jonathan Robinson School in the 1930s.

Most of the other schools in the area were established in the 1950s and 1960s, including Cheadle County Grammar School for Girls, built in 1956, which later became Margaret Danyers Sixth Form College, named after the same Danyers who was lady of the manor in the 14th century. The site is now the Cheadle campus of Cheadle and Marple Sixth Form College.

There are nine primary schools, with two secondary schools: Cheadle Hulme High School and St. James' Catholic High School, which opened in 1980, In addition, three private schools and one special school, Seashell Trust are located in the area.

== Religion ==
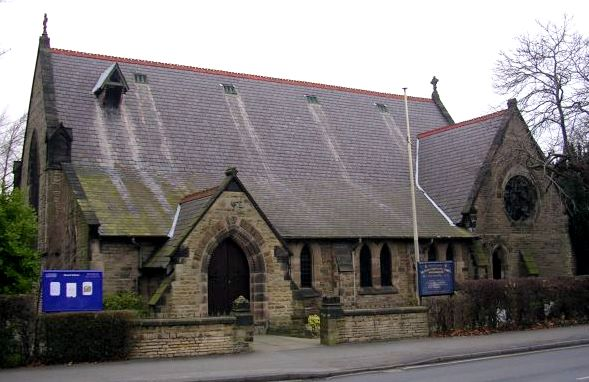
All Saints' Church on Church Road, was built in 1863. It was designed in a Victorian Gothic style and became the parish church in 1868.

The oldest reference to Methodist meetings in the area dates to 1786 and regular services took place from the early 19th century when they established their own meeting places with a Methodist church and Sunday school built in 1824. Grove Lane Baptist Church was built in 1840. Anglican worshippers used the Jonathan Robinson School from 1861 for services and in 1863 All Saints Church was built on Church Road. Seven years later the Congregational Church opened on Swann Lane, after services were held in the school room which was built a year earlier.

In 1932 a second Anglican church was built: St Andrew's Church was founded as a daughter church of St Mary's Church, Cheadle. During the Second World War, Roman Catholic services were held in the King's Hall on Station Road, and in 1952 St Ann's Church was opened on Vicarage Avenue. Grove Lane Baptist Church was rebuilt in the late 1990s and Emmanuel Church, opened in 1966 near Bruntwood Park, moved to a new building in 2001.

== Culture ==
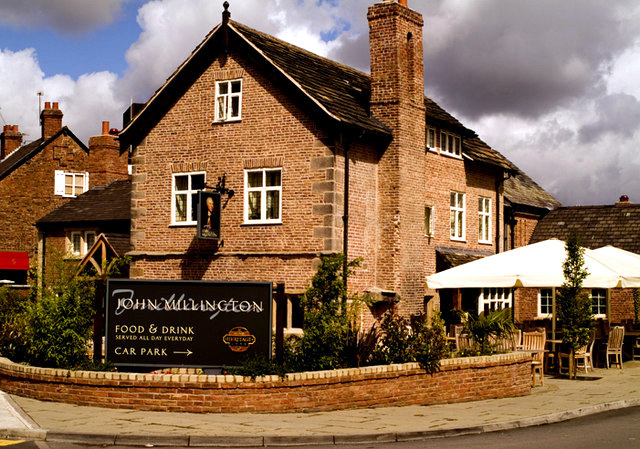
The John Millington is a public house on Station Road. It was built in 1683 and was converted into a public house in 2004. It is a Grade II listed building.

The East Cheshire Chess Club is located on Church Road and there are two amateur theatre societies: Players' Dramatic Society on Anfield Road, and Chads Theatre on Mellor Road.

Cheadle Hulme Library, which opened on 28 March 1936, is also located on Mellor Road. The suburb once had its own cinema named the Elysian Cinema, located on Station Road, but this closed in March 1974. As of 2009, the closest cinemas to Cheadle Hulme are approximately 3 miles (5 km) away in Stockport (Red Rock) and the Parrs Wood entertainment centre, both leisure complexes which include restaurants, bars, bowling and fitness facilities.

Cheadle Hulme is also home to many public houses and restaurants that serve a variety of cuisine, including Indian, Chinese and Italian. The John Millington, a Grade II listed building, was formerly Millington Hall, built for Stockport alderman John Millington. A row of cottages near to the hall served as a meeting place for local Methodists from 1814, before a purpose-built chapel was established. A Sunday school was also established in the same place. The King's Hall was built in 1937 and was originally a dance hall before its conversion into a restaurant and public house.

== Sport and leisure ==
There is a lacrosse club "Cheadle Hulme Lacrosse Club", which was established in 1893, a badminton club, and a sports club off Turves Road called the Ryecroft Sports Club, which has tennis courts and a bowling green.

The local 11-a-side football team 'Cheadle Hulme Athletic' was established in 2009 and is currently playing in Division 2 of the Stockport District Sunday Football League. 'Cheadle Hulme Galaxy FC' was established in 2013 and are currently playing in Division 2 of the Stockport District Sunday Football League. The Bowmen of Bruntwood, Stockport's only archery club, is situated in Bruntwood Park.

Club Cheadle Hulme, which is attached to Cheadle Hulme High School, contains a large sports hall, a dance studio, an astro-turf pitch and gym equipment. Manchester Rugby Club is located on Grove Lane in Cheadle Hulme, as is Cheadle Hulme Cricket Club, which was established in 1881, and a squash club.

== Notable people ==
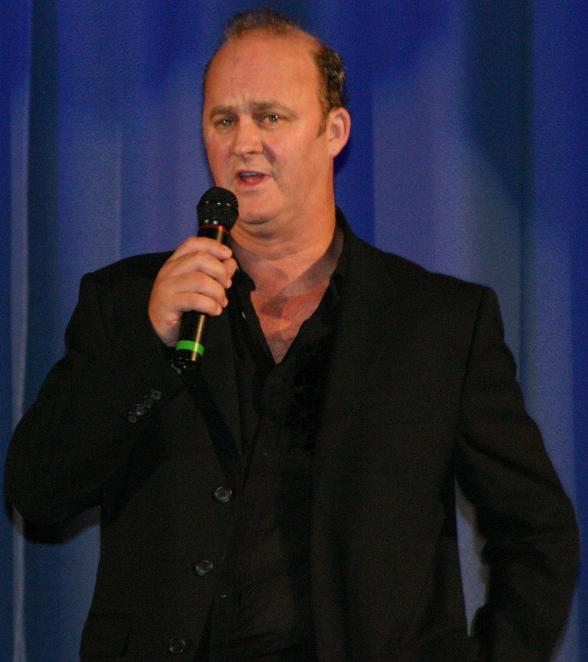
Tim McInnerny, 2006

- Joshua Brookes (1754–1821), an Anglican divine and English eccentric.
- John Siddeley, 1st Baron Kenilworth (1866–1953), developed the automobile industry, founded the Siddeley Autocar Company in 1902
- James Kirk (1897–1918), a British Army officer and a recipient of the Victoria Cross (VC)
- Mildred Creak (1898–1993), a child psychiatrist known for her work on autism and organic mental disorders.
- Patrick du Val (1903–1987), mathematician, worked on algebraic & differential geometry and general relativity.
- Dame Felicity Hyde, Lady Peake (1913–2002), founding director of the Women's Royal Air Force (WRAF)
- John Mayall (1933–2024), blues musician, founded John Mayall & the Bluesbreakers
- Helen Atkinson-Wood (born 1955), an English actress and comedian, a presenter for Channel 4's Collector's Lot
- Julian Turner (born 1955), poet and mental health worker.
- Tim McInnerny (born 1956), actor, appeared as Lord Percy Percy and Captain Kevin Darling in Blackadder
- Danny Pugh (born 1982), football coach and former footballer who played 368 games
- Jennifer Pike (born 1989), a violinist, member of the BBC Radio 3 New Generation Artists scheme from 2008 to 2010
- Tyrese Campbell (born 1999), footballer who played 146 games for Stoke City
- Kobbie Mainoo (born 2005), footballer who plays for Manchester United.

== See also ==
- Listed buildings in Cheadle and Gatley
