= Ladybrook =

Ladybrook may refer to:

- Ladybrook, a district of Andersonstown, Northern Ireland
- Ladybrook Valley, a valley in Stockport, England
