= Amina Khoulani =

Syrian survivor of Assad's prisons

- آمنة خولاني
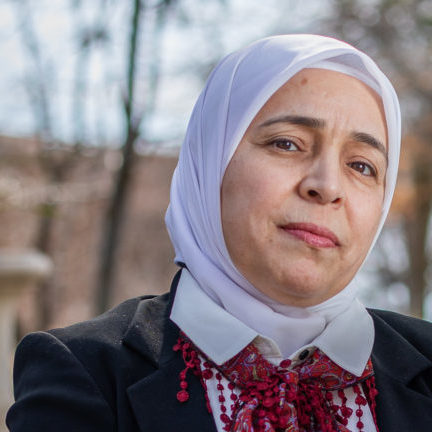
- Born: 1974 (age 51–52); Darayya, syria
- Education: University of Damascus
- Children: 3

Amina Khoulani (Arabic: آمنة خولاني) is a Syrian human rights activist and a survivor of Assad's prisons, known for her advocacy work on behalf of political prisoners and their families. She gained exile in Manchester, United Kingdom, in 2014. Since then she has campaigned for other prisoners and helped to support their families. She was chosen as an International Women of Courage Award recipient in March 2020.

== Life ==
In 2013 she was arrested after peaceful protests in Syria. She would serve six months but her husband would be imprisoned for two and a half years in the Sednaya prison. 140,000 Syrians went to jail without charge and her three brothers would die in jail.

In 2014 she left Syria. Khoulani devoted herself to campaigning for the release of other Syrian prisoners and in 2017 she was one of the founders of "Families for Freedom". The British-based charity helps the families of those detained or missing.

She was chosen as an International Woman of Courage on 4 March 2020 by the US Secretary of State. After the ceremony she was hosted in Birmingham, Alabama.

She went to New York in 2022 to support her friend Yasmen Almachan. Four of Almachan brothers had died in jail and another was killed by ISIS. Almachan's fifth brother, Ogba, disappeared in 2011 and there was no news of where he was. She later discovered a photo which showed his abused body. He had been killed after torture in a Syrian prison. Almachan and Khloulani were founding members of "Families for Freedom". They went to the UN in New York to ask for intervention in finding the fate of those who have disappeared in Syria.

== Private life ==
She is married. They have three children and they live in Heald in Manchester.
