= Micker Brook =

River in North West England

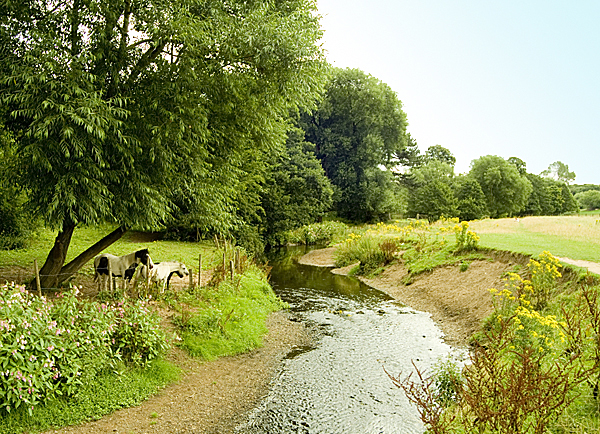
- Micker Brook near Cheadle Hulme in 2005

Location
- Country: England

Physical characteristics
- Source
  - location: near to Disley, Cheshire (as Bollinhurst Brook)
- Mouth: River Mersey
  - location: near Cheadle Village, Greater Manchester
  - coordinates: 53°24′5.76″N 2°14′19.92″W

Basin features
- Tributaries
  - left: Poynton Brook
  - right: Chorlton Brook

Micker Brook is a tributary of the River Mersey in North West England.

Known early in its course as Bollinhurst Brook and Norbury Brook, then Lady Brook, the river runs along the Ladybrook Valley westward and northward through Hazel Grove, Bramhall and Cheadle. It joins the River Mersey not far from the M60 motorway near to Cheadle Village, Stockport.

== Course ==
Beginning as Bollinhurst Brook, the Brook flows down from the hills between Disley and Whaley Bridge where it feeds Bollinhurst Reservoir and Horse Copice Reservoir respectively. The Brook then flows between High Lane and Higher Poynton where it passes under an aqueduct carrying the Macclesfield Canal. At this point the Brook becomes Norbury Brook, it then passes close to Poynton Lake where it is joined by Poynton Brook and becomes Ladybrook.

Ladybrook then proceeds to flow westward through the settlements of Bramhall, Cheadle Hulme and Cheadle Village where it is finally known as Micker Brook. It then flows past the Alexandra Hospital where it flows under the M60 motorway and is then joined by Chorlton Brook. The Brook then joins the River Mersey, thus joining the Mersey Catchment, which itself drains into the Irish Sea.

== Water quality ==
Micker Brook was marked as having 'poor ecological status' by the Environment Agency in 2025; scoring either poor or moderately in most categories. United Utilities appointed a third party firm to construct a new overflow management system to reduce storm drainage and waste flowing into the brook, with work expected to be completed in 2027.
