= Dan Tiernan =

British comedian

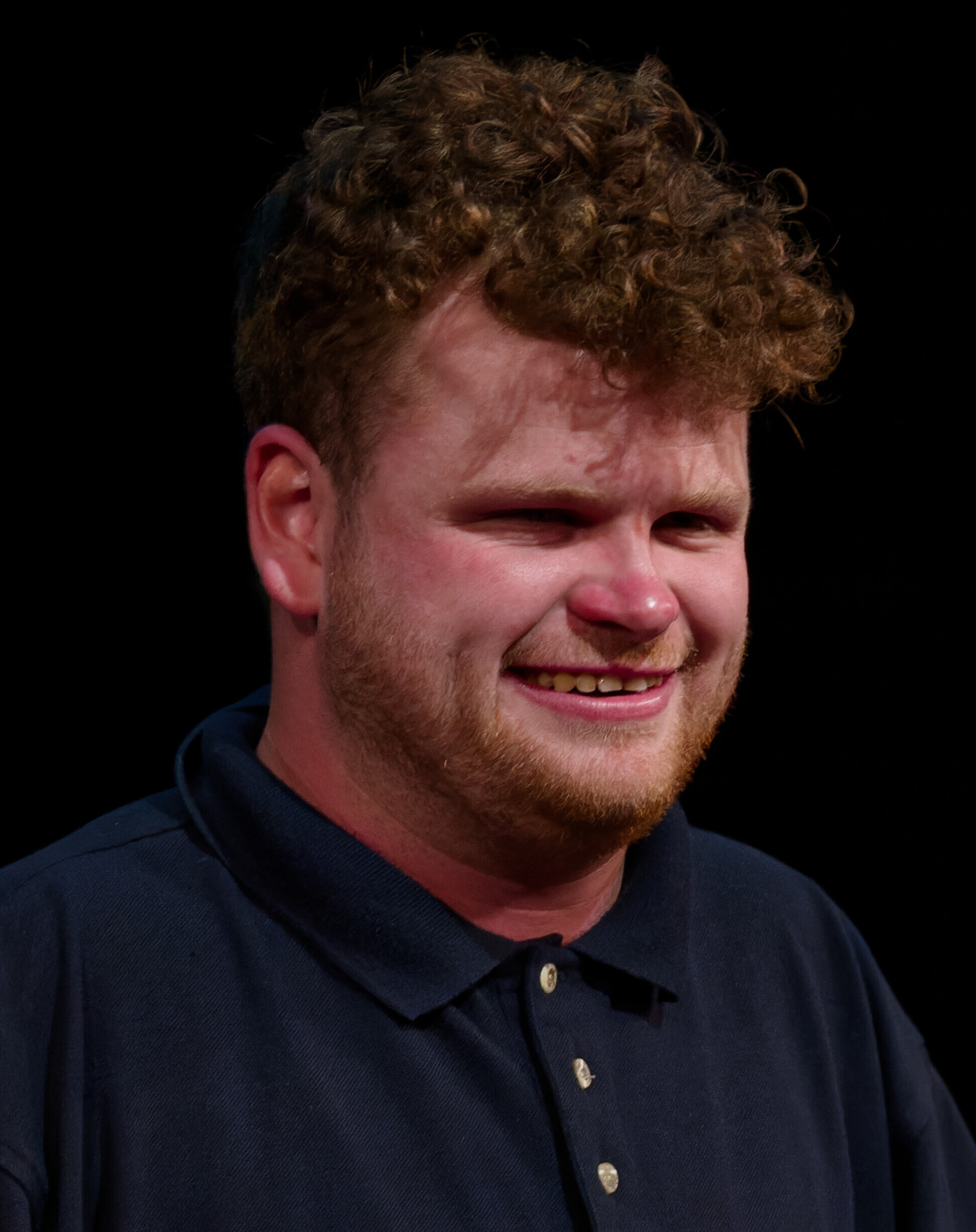
- Tiernan in 2024
- Born: 1996; Stockport, England
- Education: University of Salford
- Occupations: Stand-up comedian, Actor
- Years active: 2020–present
- Agent: Blue Book Artist Management
- Notable work: Dan Tiernan: "Stomp" Dan Tiernan: "Going Under" (debut Edinburgh Fringe show) Dan Tiernan: "All In"
- Television: Doctors, 8 Out of 10 Cats Does Countdown, Live at the Apollo, Mitchell And Webb Are Not Helping, QI, The Comedy Roast For SU2C, The Stand Up Sketch Show, Comedy Central Live
- Awards: British Comedian of the Year (2022); BBC New Comedy Award (2022); Winner of Best Newcomer – ISH Comedy Awards (2023); Nominee for Best Newcomer – Edinburgh Comedy Award (2023); Nominee for Next Big thing – British Comedy Guide (2025); Nominee for Best Show – Edinburgh Comedy Award (2025)

Dan Tiernan (born 1996) is a British stand-up comedian and actor. In 2022, he was named "British Comedian of the Year", and won the BBC New Comedy Award.

== Career ==
Born in Stockport, Tiernan took a comedy course at age 21.

He won the Frog and Bucket Comedy Club's "Beat the Frog" new stand-up competition in 2020.

In 2021, he was a finalist in the Leicester Mercury Comedian of the Year at the Leicester Comedy Festival.

In 2022, he performed on Rosie Jones's Disability Comedy Extravaganza (Series 1). Dan then went on to compete in and win BBC New Comedy Award 2022 and the British Comedian Of The Year 2022.

In September 2023, he portrayed Logan Padmore in an episode of the BBC soap opera Doctors, Comedy Central Live - Series 2 and The Stand Up Sketch Show - Series 5 over multiple episodes.

In 2023, Tiernan performed his debut hour at the Edinburgh Fringe Festival, "Going Under", to positive reviews. He received a nomination for Best Newcomer at Edinburgh Comedy Award 2023 and won Best Newcomer at the ISH Comedy Awards 2023.

In April 2024, he was a guest on the Underground and Underwater episode of QI, in July 2024, he was a guest on 8 Out of 10 Cats Does Countdown, and in August 2024 he was a guest on The Last Leg The Last Leg In Paris.

In December 2024, Tiernan performed on Live at the Apollo.

In 2025, Tiernan took the show "All In" to the Edinburgh Fringe Festival, to positive reviews and receiving the nomination for Best Show at Edinburgh Comedy Award 2025. While at the Fringe he also performed at Fern Brady Presents: Comedy At The Fringe and Channel 4's A Comedy Thing LIVE!

Outside of the Fringe, in 2025, Tiernan has starred in Channel 4's A Comedy Thing, performing in Mitchell And Webb Are Not Helping and judging on BBC New Comedy Awards 2025.

In 2026, Tiernan returned to the Edinburgh Fringe with Quartz and All, which was nominated for Best Comedy Show at the Edinburgh Comedy Awards.

== Personal life ==
Tiernan attended Hulme Hall school, and later on the University of Salford.

Tiernan is dyspraxic. He is gay. He has a younger sister.
