= Peel Hall, Wythenshawe =

Area in Wythenshawe, Manchester, England

Coordinates: 53.3782°N 2.2461°W

Peel Hall
- Suburb
- Location within Greater Manchester
- Metropolitan borough: Manchester
- Metropolitan county: Greater Manchester
- Region: North West
- Country: England
- Sovereign state: United Kingdom
- Post town: Manchester
- Postcode district: M22
- Dialling code: 0161
- Police: Greater Manchester
- Fire: Greater Manchester
- Ambulance: North West
- UK Parliament: Wythenshawe and Sale East

Peel Hall is a suburb of Manchester, England, nine miles south of the city centre and a mile north of Manchester Airport. Peel Hall is on the eastern edge of Wythenshawe, bordering Heald Green and Gatley in the Metropolitan Borough of Stockport, and is mainly residential.

== Housing and amenities ==
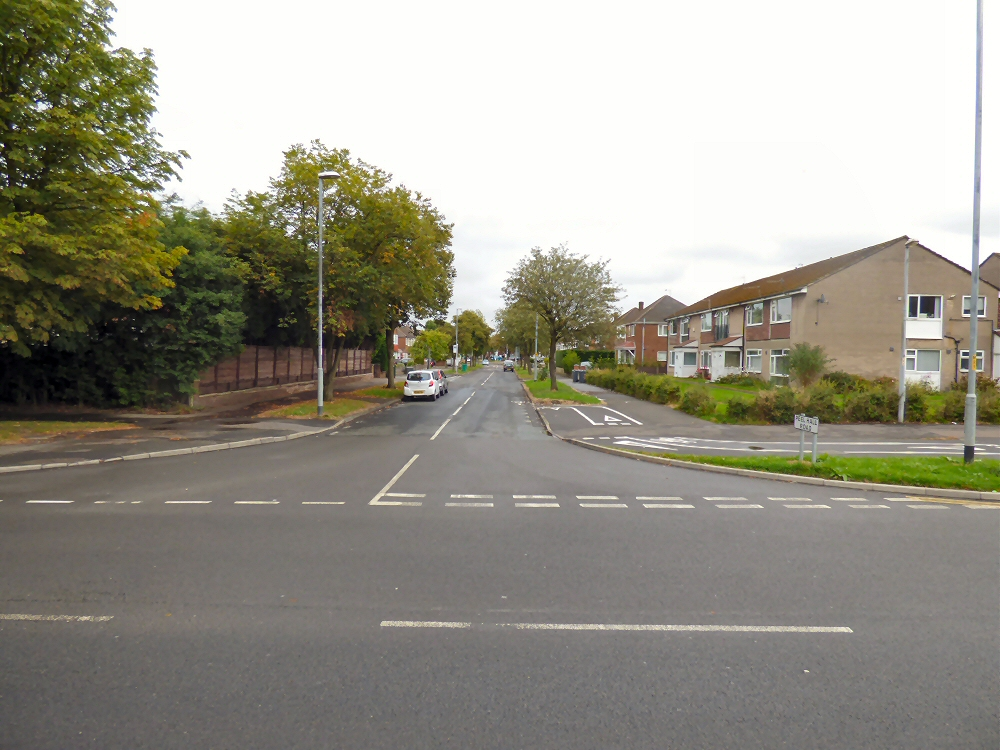
Peel Hall Road

Peel Hall comprises both social and private housing, most of which was built in the 1950s and 1960s. The community has a medical practice and a post office.

=== Church ===
The Anglican parish church was built in 1969 and dedicated to St Richard of Chichester; it began with a Sunday school on the site in 1960, became an ecclesiastical district in 1969 when the present church was built, and a parish in 1971. The construction incorporated stones from a number of different cathedrals, including Chichester Cathedral.

=== Primary school ===
Peel Hall Primary Academy in Ashurst Road takes 3 to 11-year old pupils.

== Manor house ==
Peel Hall, an Elizabethan moated manor house just off Peel Hall Road at the junction of Lomond Road, belonged to the Egertons of Wythenshawe Hall. It fell into disrepair in the 1960s and was demolished. The moat survives, surrounded by a park which has recreation facilities and a children's playground. The moat was not defensive but, similar to the one at Little Morton Hall in Cheshire, an Elizabethan feature to keep out animals. The site is recorded as a scheduled monument.
