= John Millington (pub) =

Listed pub in Cheadle Hulme, Greater Manchester, England

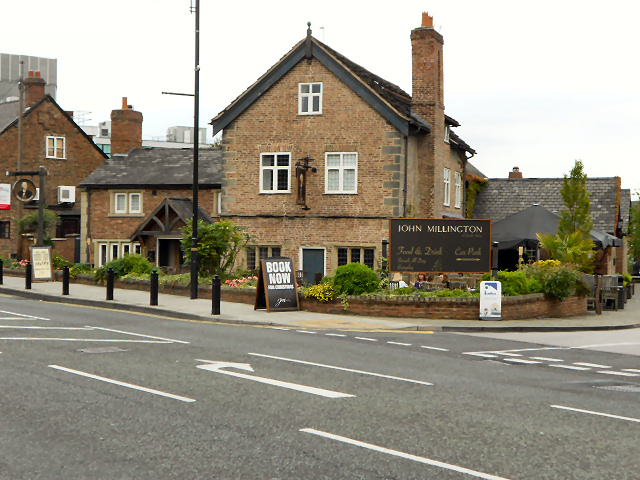
- The pub in 2011

- Location within Greater Manchester
- Former names: Millington Hall

General information
- Type: House (former); Restaurant (former); Pub-restaurant (2006–present)
- Location: 67 Station Road, Cheadle Hulme, Greater Manchester, England
- Coordinates: 53°22′31″N 2°11′12.5″W
- Year built: Late 17th century
- Renovated: c. 2004–2006 (converted and extended)
- Owner: Hydes Brewery

Design and construction
- Designations

Listed Building – Grade II
- Official name: John Millington public house
- Designated: 11 October 1985
- Reference no.: 1241640

Website
- thejohnmillington.co.uk

The John Millington is a Grade II listed public house and restaurant on Station Road in Cheadle Hulme, a suburb within the Metropolitan Borough of Stockport, Greater Manchester, England. Built as a house in the late 17th century for the alderman John Millington, it was later used for hand‑loom silk weaving and came into the ownership of the Hazeldine family. The building, then trading as the Millington Hall restaurant, was listed in 1985, and reopened as the John Millington pub in 2006 following restoration by Hydes Brewery, who remain the freehold owners.

== History ==
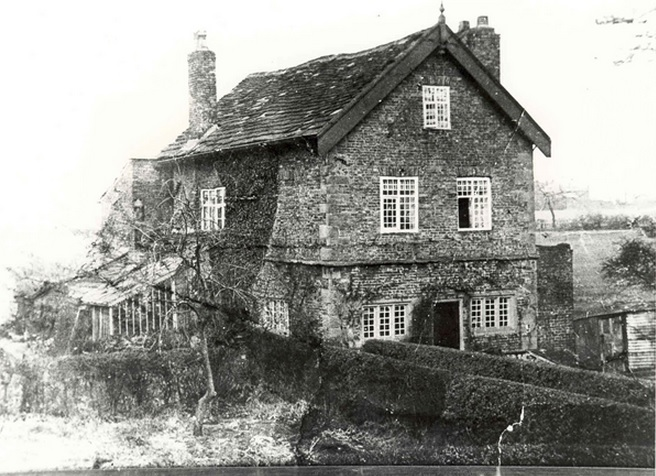
Millington Hall in 1890

The building was constructed as a house in the late 17th century, according to its official listing. (Note: Other sources gives a construction date of 1683.) It was built for John Millington, a local alderman who died in 1694. It was later used for hand‑loom silk weaving and came into the ownership of the Hazeldine family. An outbuilding with a thatched roof was converted into three cottages, which were used for Methodist meetings in 1814 and are now small shops. Another, smaller outbuilding has since been adapted for use as a florist.

On 11 October 1985, the building, then trading as the Millington Hall restaurant, was designated a Grade II listed structure. It reopened as the John Millington public house in June 2006, having undergone a wide‑ranging restoration by Hydes Brewery, who remain the freehold owners.

== Architecture ==
=== Exterior ===
The building is constructed in brick with stone detailing and has a stone‑slate roof. It has three bays at the front and two at the side, with a large lean‑to extension on the left and at the rear. It has two storeys with an attic and a gabled entrance. The corners are finished in stone, and there is a simple first‑floor band and 19th‑century bargeboards and finial.

The entrance is in the centre, with a three‑light stone‑framed window on each side. The first floor has two two‑light casement windows, and the attic has one, all set under flat brick arches. The left side is mostly hidden by the later lean‑to, but a four‑light ground‑floor window of the same type survives. On the right side, the first bay has a three‑light window, while the second and third bays contain a 19th‑century door and bay window. The first floor has one small two‑light casement and two larger windows with leaded glazing under brick arches. A dormer above contains two three‑light leaded casements. At the rear, a prominent chimney stack rises in two shafts that join in an arch at the top.

=== Interior ===
Inside, the pub is arranged as a series of rooms served by a central bar, with partitions creating smaller seating areas. A kitchen and service yard occupy the rear of the building.

== See also ==
- Listed buildings in Cheadle and Gatley
- Listed pubs in Greater Manchester
