= James Kirk (VC) =

Recipient of the Victoria Cross

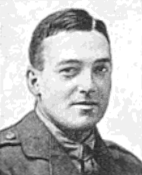
- Born: 27 January 1897; Cheadle Hulme, Cheshire, England
- Died: 4 November 1918 (aged 21); Oise Canal, near Ors, France
- Burial place: Ors Communal Cemetery, France
- Military career
- Allegiance: United Kingdom
- Branch: British Army
- Service years: 1915–1918
- Rank: Second Lieutenant
- Units: Manchester Regiment
- Conflicts: World War I
- Awards: Victoria Cross

Second Lieutenant James Kirk VC (27 January 1897 – 4 November 1918) was a British Army officer and an English recipient of the Victoria Cross (VC), the highest and most prestigious award for gallantry in the face of the enemy.

Kirk was born on 27 January 1897 in Cheadle Hulme, Cheshire to James and Rachel Kirk. He enlisted as a private in the Manchester Regiment in 1915, and was commissioned as a second lieutenant in June 1918. Kirk was a 21-year-old second lieutenant in the 10th Battalion, The Manchester Regiment, British Army, attached to the 2nd Battalion during the First World War when the actions that led to his recognition took place.

== Citation ==
For most conspicuous bravery and devotion to duty North of Ors on 4 Nov., 1918, whilst attempting to bridge the Oise Canal. To cover the bridging of the canal he took a Lewis gun, and, under intense machine-gun fire, paddled across the canal on a raft, and at a range of ten yards expended all his ammunition. Further ammunition was paddled across to him and he continuously maintained a covering fire for the bridging party from a most exposed position till killed at his gun. The supreme contempt of danger and magnificent self-sacrifice displayed by this gallant officer prevented many casualties and enabled two platoons to cross the bridge before it was destroyed.

== Bibliography ==
- Buzzell, Nora, ed. (1997). The Register of the Victoria Cross. Cheltenham, Gloucestershire: This England Alma House. ISBN 0-906324-27-0.
- Gliddon, Gerald (2014) [2000]. The Final Days 1918. VCs of the First World War. Stroud, Gloucestershire: The History Press. ISBN 978-0-7509-5368-9.
