= Cheadle Royal Hospital =

Hospital in Greater Manchester, England

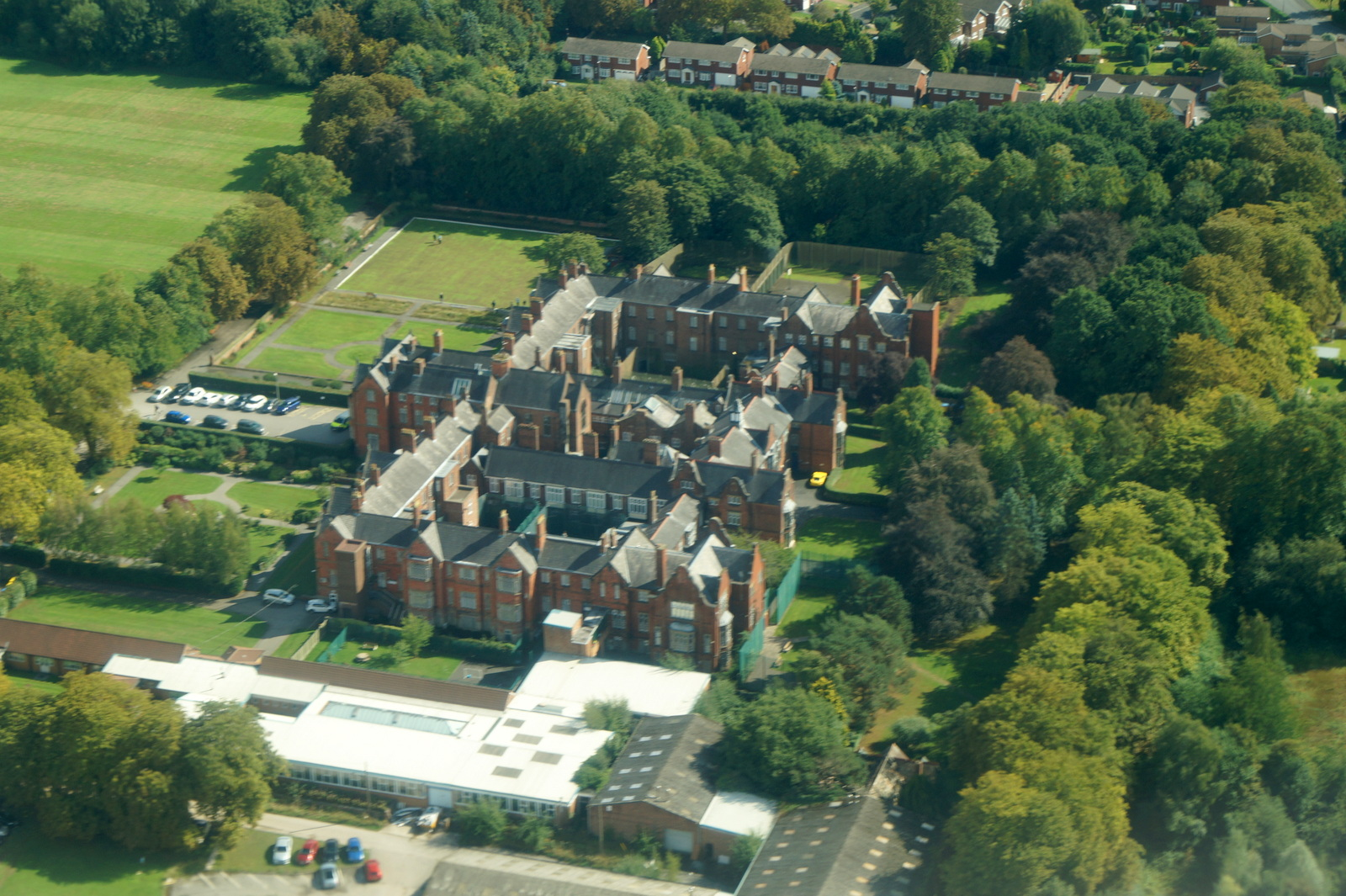
- Cheadle Royal Hospital from the air

- Shown in Greater Manchester

Geography
- Location: Heald Green, Greater Manchester, England
- Coordinates: 53°22′29″N 2°13′16″W

Organisation
- Care system: Private
- Type: Specialist

Services
- Emergency department: No
- Speciality: Mental Health

History
- Founded: 1763

Cheadle Royal Hospital is a psychiatric hospital in Heald Green, Greater Manchester, England, built between 1848 and 1849. The main building is Grade II listed.

== History ==
The hospital was founded at a time when only two other similar institutions existed in England (Bethlem and St Luke's) and was initially located next to the Manchester Infirmary in 1763. It was designed by Richard Lane in the Elizabethan style and it opened as the Manchester Lunatic Hospital in 1766. It had 24 beds when it opened, but had over 100 patients by 1800.

The facility relocated to Cheadle, 10 miles (16 km) to the south, as the Manchester Royal Hospital for the Insane, in 1849. Voluntary patients, known as boarders, were admitted from 1863. The hospital expanded through the construction of villas on the Cheadle site in the 1860s and through the acquisition of houses in Colwyn Bay in the 1870s. The site in Cheadle was initially 37 acres (15 ha); in the following 80 years about 220 acres (89 ha) were added and the original part of the site subsequently became formal gardens and sport and recreation grounds. A convalescent hospital at Glan-y-Don, Colwyn Bay, was also established.

The facility became Cheadle Royal Hospital in 1902 and North House, with accommodation for 80 additional patients, was opened in 1903. It had provision for the treatment of 400 patients in 1928 but it chose to remain private rather than joining the National Health Service in 1948. The hospital was acquired by its management team in 1997 and then by Priory Group in 2010.

== Famous patients ==
Famous patients have included:

- Johnny Briggs, cricketer
- Margot Bryant, actress
- Arthur Ransome, children's writer and journalist

== See also ==
- Listed buildings in Cheadle and Gatley
- Healthcare in Greater Manchester
- List of hospitals in England
