= St Mary's Church, Cheadle =

Coordinates: 53.3942°N 2.2175°W

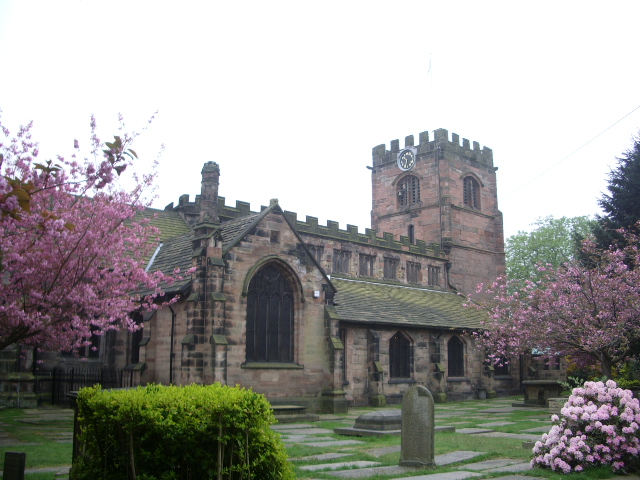
- St Mary's Church, Cheadle, from the southeast

- Location in Greater Manchester
- OS grid reference: SJ 856 887
- Location: High Street, Cheadle, Greater Manchester
- Country: England
- Denomination: Church of England
- Churchmanship: Conservative Evangelical
- Website: St Mary's, Cheadle

History
- Status: Parish church

Architecture
- Functional status: Active
- Heritage designation: Grade I
- Designated: 24 March 1950
- Architectural type: Church
- Style: Perpendicular

Specifications
- Materials: Sandstone, slate roof

Administration
- Province: York
- Diocese: Chester
- Archdeaconry: Macclesfield
- Deanery: Cheadle
- Parish: Cheadle

Clergy
- Rector: Revd George T Crowder

St Mary's Church in Cheadle, Greater Manchester, England, is a Grade I listed building. It is an Anglican parish church in the diocese of Chester, the archdeaconry of Macclesfield and the deanery of Cheadle. Its benefice is united with that of St Cuthbert.

== History ==
A church has been on this site since at least 1200, but the present church was built mainly between 1520 and 1550. The south chapel was completed in 1530, the nave in 1541, and the tower was built between 1520 and 1540. The chancel was built between 1556 and 1558 for Lady Katheryn Bulkeley, who had formerly been the Abbess of Godstow. The south porch is dated 1634, but this was the date it was repaired rather than the date of its building. The church was rebuilt and restored between 1859 and 1862, and there was a further restoration by J. Medland Taylor in 1878–80. In the 20th century, a cloakroom was added.

== Architecture ==
=== Exterior ===
The church is built in grey sandstone and is entirely in the Perpendicular style. Its plan consists of a tower centrally at the west, a four-bay nave with clerestory, a south porch and north and south aisles. At the east end of each aisle is a chapel. The chancel is wider than the nave, and to its north is a vestry. The tower is in three stages with diagonal buttresses, a clock in the second stage, four-light bell openings, and a castellated parapet with gargoyles. The parapet of the nave is also castellated. The porch has angle buttresses which terminate in crocketed pinnacles. The doorway is of Tudor pattern with panels of carved tracery. At the west end of the chancel gable is a bellcote.

=== Interior ===
The roof is camber beam in type with gilded bosses. The chancel screen incorporates parts of the earlier rood screen. The choir stalls date from the 19th century, and are elaborately carved with scenes and poppyheads. The sedilia dates from 1862, and the pulpit from the 1870s. Both chapels have carved screens containing original material from the 15th and 16th centuries in their lower parts. The baluster font is dated 1837 and is by George Smith. On display in the church is an 11th-century stone cross, discovered during the construction of the nearby Barnes Hospital in 1874. The chapel at the east end of the north aisle is the Savage Chapel, built in 1529 by Sir John Savage and his wife Elizabeth. Inside is the entrance to the former rood loft. At the east end of the south aisle is the Brereton Chapel, which houses three effigies - one is in sandstone and represents Sir Thomas Brereton of Handforth who died in 1673. The screen round the chapel was erected by Sir Urian Brereton. The church contains brasses dating from the 17th and 18th centuries. There is also a tablet dated 1817 by John Bacon junior. In a south aisle window is a fragment of ancient glass with the Stanley arms. This has been incorporated in a window of 1917 designed by Christopher Whall. On the south side of the church is a window of 1921 by Veronica Whall. There are windows in the sides of the chancel dating from the 1860s by Charles Gibbs, and windows elsewhere by Mayer of Munich. The organ was built in 1881 by Hill and Son of London. There is a ring of eight bells. Six of these by Abel Rudhall are dated 1749 and the other two by John Taylor and Company date from 1882. The parish registers begin in 1558.

== External features ==
In the churchyard are the base of a medieval cross shaft which has been converted into a sundial, the base of another cross in red sandstone dating from the 14th or 15th century which was restored to form a memorial in 1873, and the 18th-century chest tomb of the Crosier family. These are all listed at Grade II. Also listed at Grade II is the lych gate erected in 1883. In addition the churchyard contains the war graves of three soldiers of World War I.

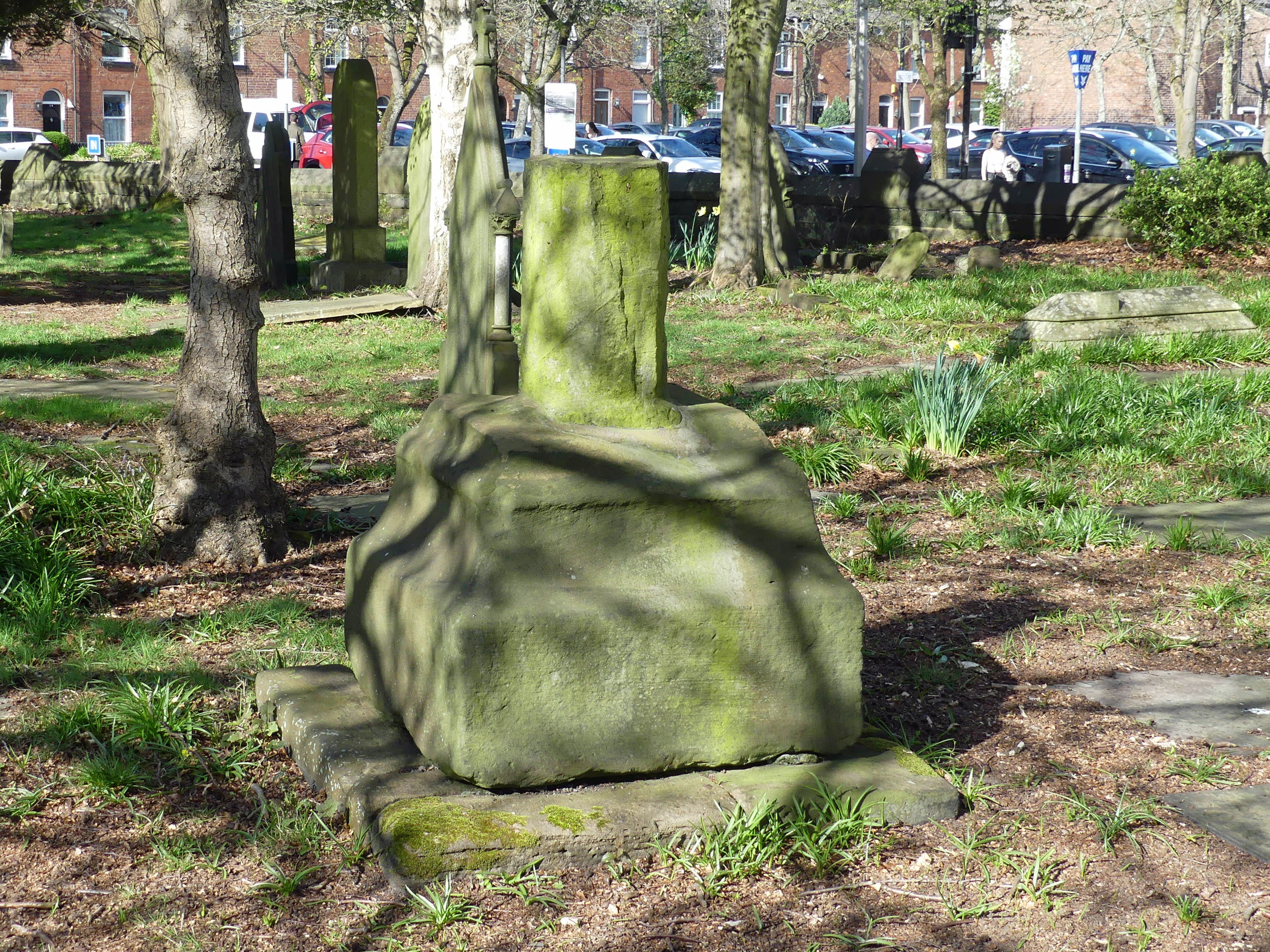
Cross, now sundial

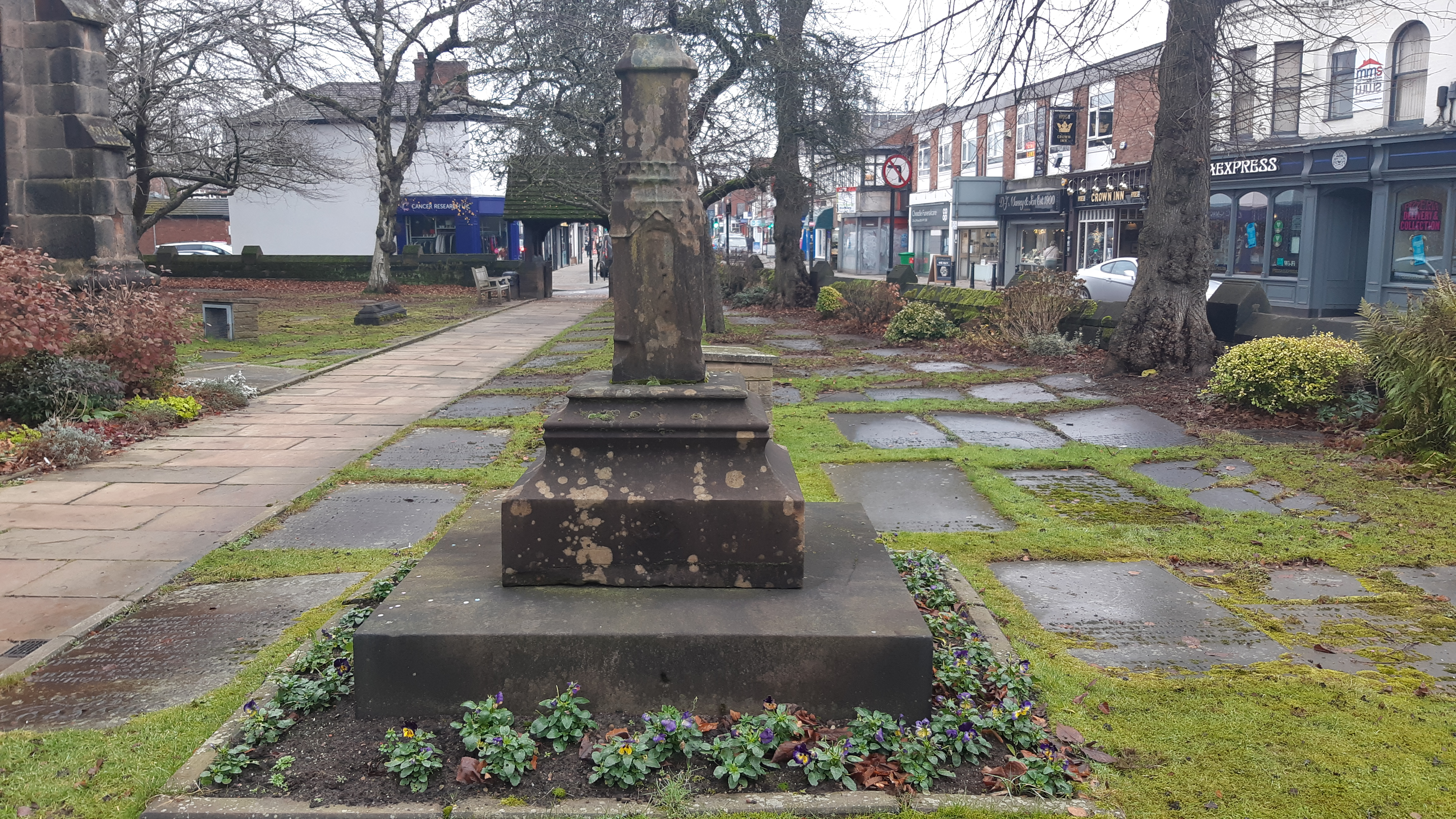
Cross, now memorial

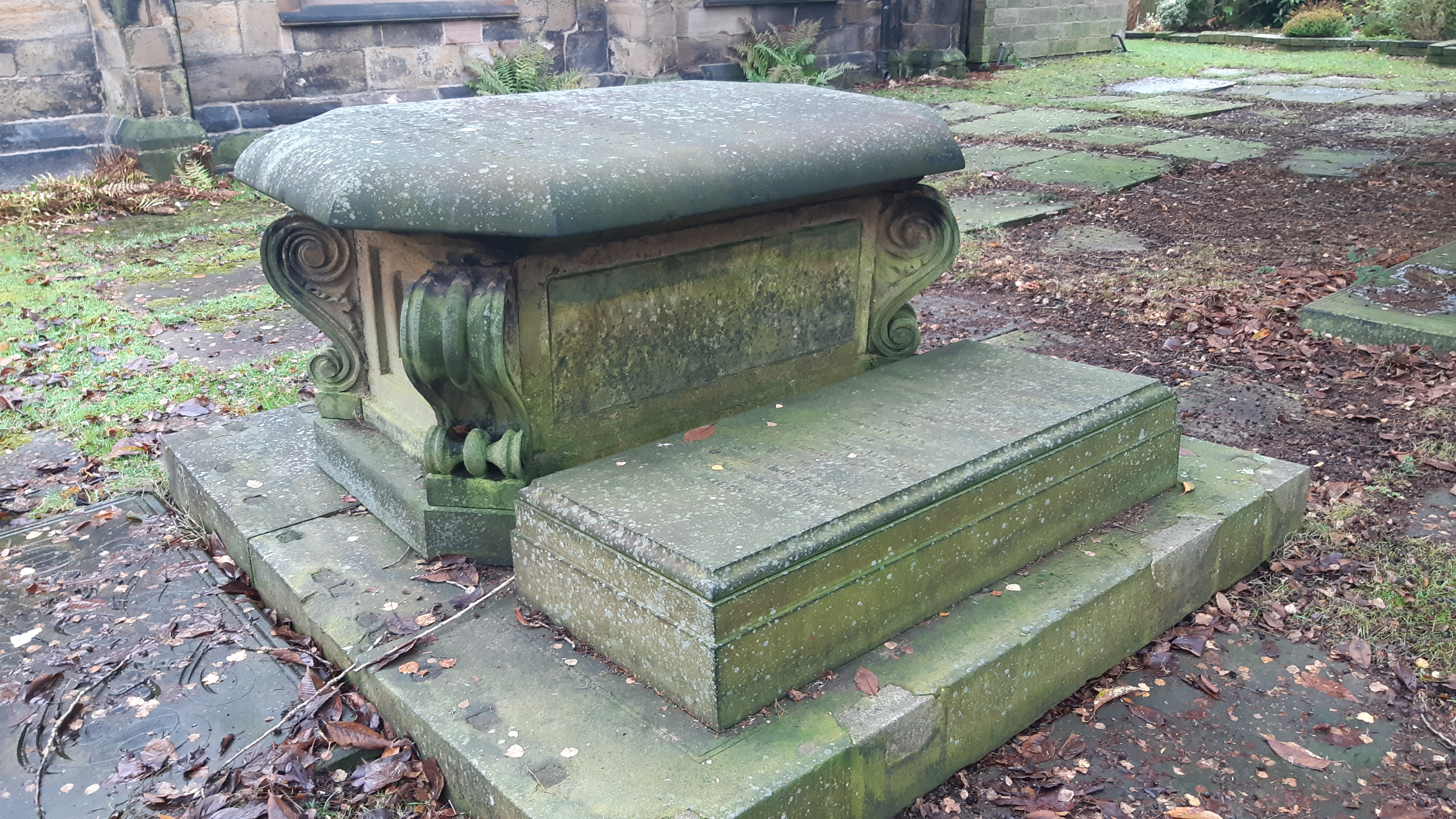
Crosier family tomb

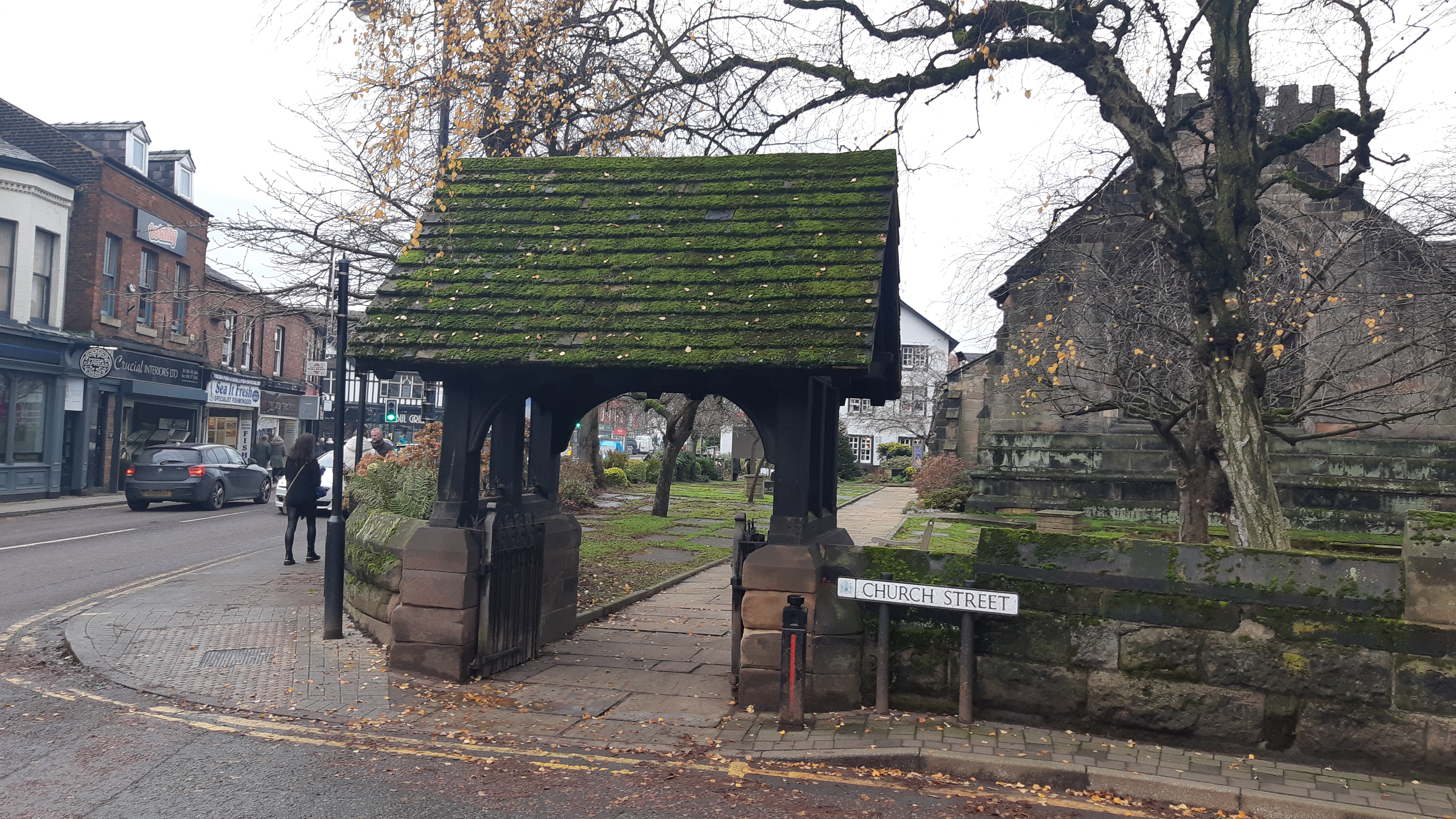
Lych gate

== Present day ==
On 24 March 1950, the church was designated as a Grade I listed building.

St Mary's Church is within the conservative evangelical tradition of the Church of England, and it has passed resolutions to reject the ordination of women.

== Notable clergy ==
- Donald Allister, later Bishop of Peterborough, was Rector of the benefice from 1989 to 2002.
- Leonard Ashton, later Chaplain-in-Chief of the RAF and Bishop in Cyprus and the Gulf, served his curacy here.
- Colin Buchanan, later Principal of St John's College, Nottingham and a bishop, served his curacy here.
- Wallace Benn, later Bishop of Lewes, served his curacy here
- Rob Munro, later Bishop of Ebbsfleet who was appointed on 9 December 2022, served here for almost 20 years, from 2003 to January 2023.

== See also ==
- Grade I listed churches in Greater Manchester
- Listed buildings in Cheadle and Gatley
- List of churches in Greater Manchester
