= Alexandra Hospital (Cheadle) =

The Alexandra Hospital
- Circle Health
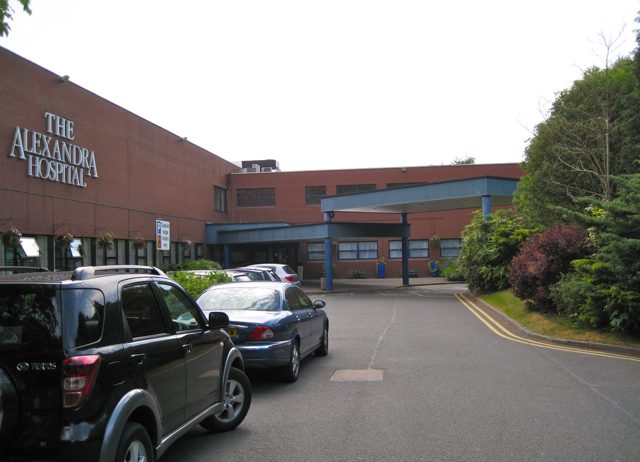
- Entrance, Alexandra Hospital, Cheadle

- Shown in Greater Manchester

Geography
- Location: Cheadle, Greater Manchester, England, United Kingdom
- Coordinates: 53.396787°N 2.216403°W

Organisation
- Care system: Private

Services
- Emergency department: No

History
- Founded: 1981

The Alexandra Hospital is a private hospital in Cheadle, Greater Manchester, operated by Circle Health. It is the largest private hospital in the UK outside London.

== History ==
The facility was founded in 1981, and has treated a number of notable patients, including Russell Watson, Fabrice Muamba, and Alex Ferguson. Matt Busby died in the hospital in 1994.

== Services ==
Over 600 consultants work from the hospital, offering a range of services including Orthopaedics, Cardiology, Fertility treatment, an imaging suite including CT and MRI, seven operating theatres, and a 5-bed intensive care unit. The hospital has 128 beds, all in individual en-suite rooms.

The hospital's latest inspection by the Care Quality Commission found most aspects of care to be 'Good', but the safety of its intensive care facility was judged as 'Requires Improvement'.

In 2016, the hospital was criticised for employing an anaesthetics nurse who had forged her qualifications.

== See also ==
- Healthcare in Greater Manchester
- Private healthcare in the United Kingdom
- Circle Health
- BMI Healthcare
