= Ladybrook Valley =

Valley in Cheshire, England

Coordinates: 53°24′04″N 2°13′19″W

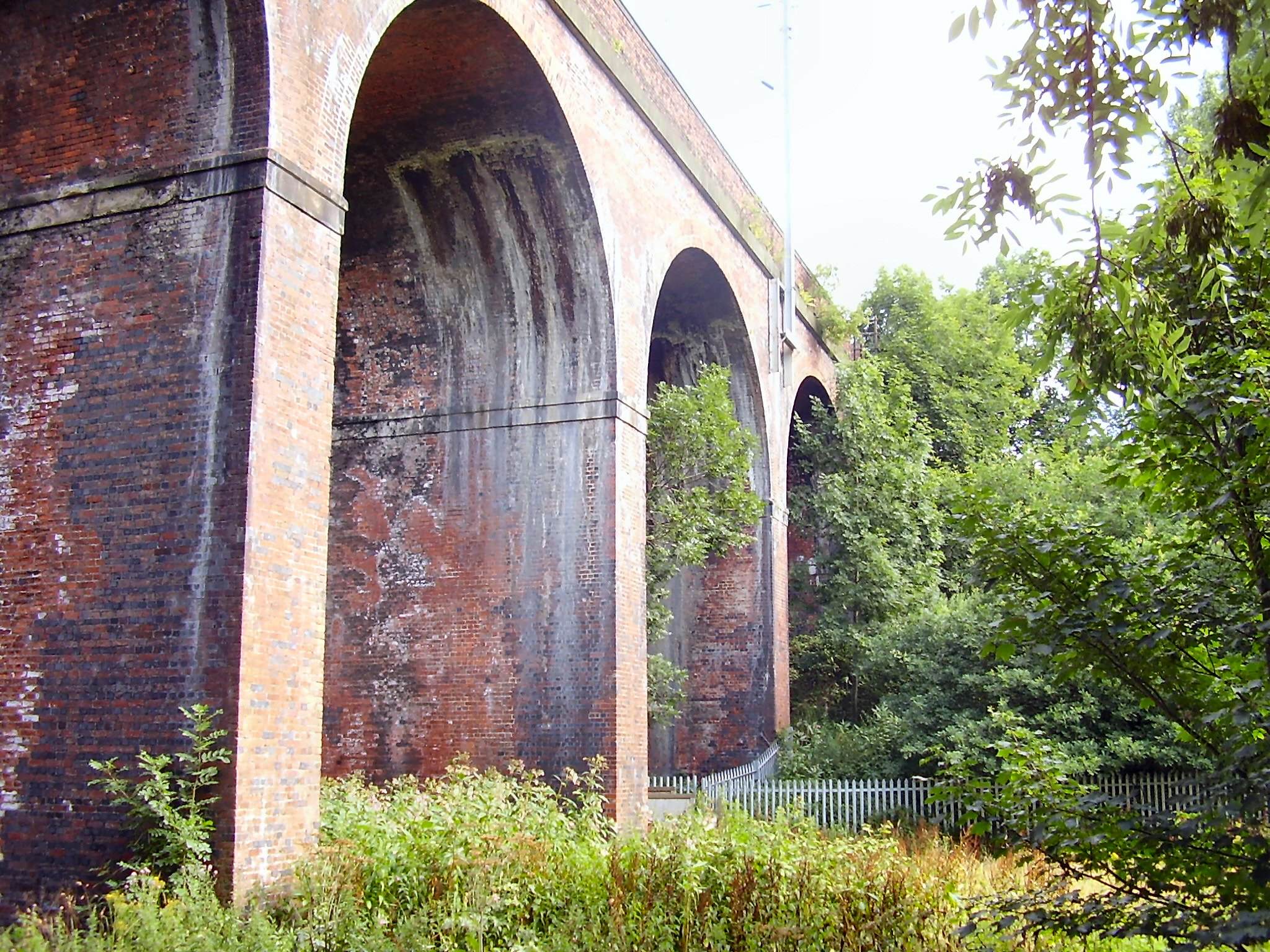
Part of Cheadle Hulme's seven arches railway viaduct spanning the Ladybrook Valley in 2007

Ladybrook Valley begins in the Peak District, central-northern England, and runs through the Metropolitan Borough of Stockport. In its 15 kilometres (9.3 mi) course, the brook falls 275 metres (902 ft). At various points it is called Bollinhurst Brook, Norbury Brook, the Ladybrook and the Micker Brook.

The valley has some notable features along its course including Bramall Hall, and the Grade II listed Seven Arches Railway Viaduct in Cheadle Hulme. South of Hazel Grove it is used to delineate the boundary between Greater Manchester and Cheshire. The Ladybrook is a tributary of the River Mersey, the confluence being near Cheadle, immediately after flowing under the M60 motorway.
