= The Kingsway School =

Location
- Foxland Road; Cheadle, Greater Manchester, SK8 4QX; England; 53.3870°N 2.2263°W

Information
- Type: Academy
- Mottoes: Opportunity, Achievement, Respect; A Posse Ad Esse
- Established: 1983
- Local authority: Stockport
- Trust: Education Learning Trust
- Department for Education URN: 142509 Tables
- Ofsted: Reports
- Headteacher: Anna Fowler
- Gender: Coeducational
- Age: 11 to 16
- Enrolment: 1,448 pupils (2020)
- Website: http://www.kingsway.stockport.sch.uk/

The Kingsway School is a coeducational secondary school located in Stockport, Greater Manchester, England.

The school has sites on each side of Kingsway; on Foxland Road in Gatley to the west and Broadway in Cheadle to the east.

== History ==
The school was formed in 1983 by the merger of Broadway Boys School and Kingsway Girls School, now called the Foxland and Broadway campuses after the roads they are on. In 2014, the school celebrated the 75th anniversary of Broadway Campus and the 50th anniversary of the Foxland Campus.

Previously a community school administered by Stockport Metropolitan Borough Council, in February 2016 The Kingsway School converted to academy status. The school is now sponsored by the Education Learning Trust.

== Charitable activity ==
The school has raised over £500,000 for charities including their sister school in Kenya. This has been done through a sponsored walk every other year, an annual Christmas fair along with several other charity events. Staff from both schools often visit the other to share experiences and knowledge as well as support each other in the teaching of future generations.

== Notable former pupils ==
- Simon Gregson, actor
- Nicholas Cochrane, actor
- Oliver Cookson, entrepreneur
- Ryan Thomas, actor
- Adam Thomas, actor
- Hallam Hope, footballer
- George Evans, footballer
