= Seashell Trust =

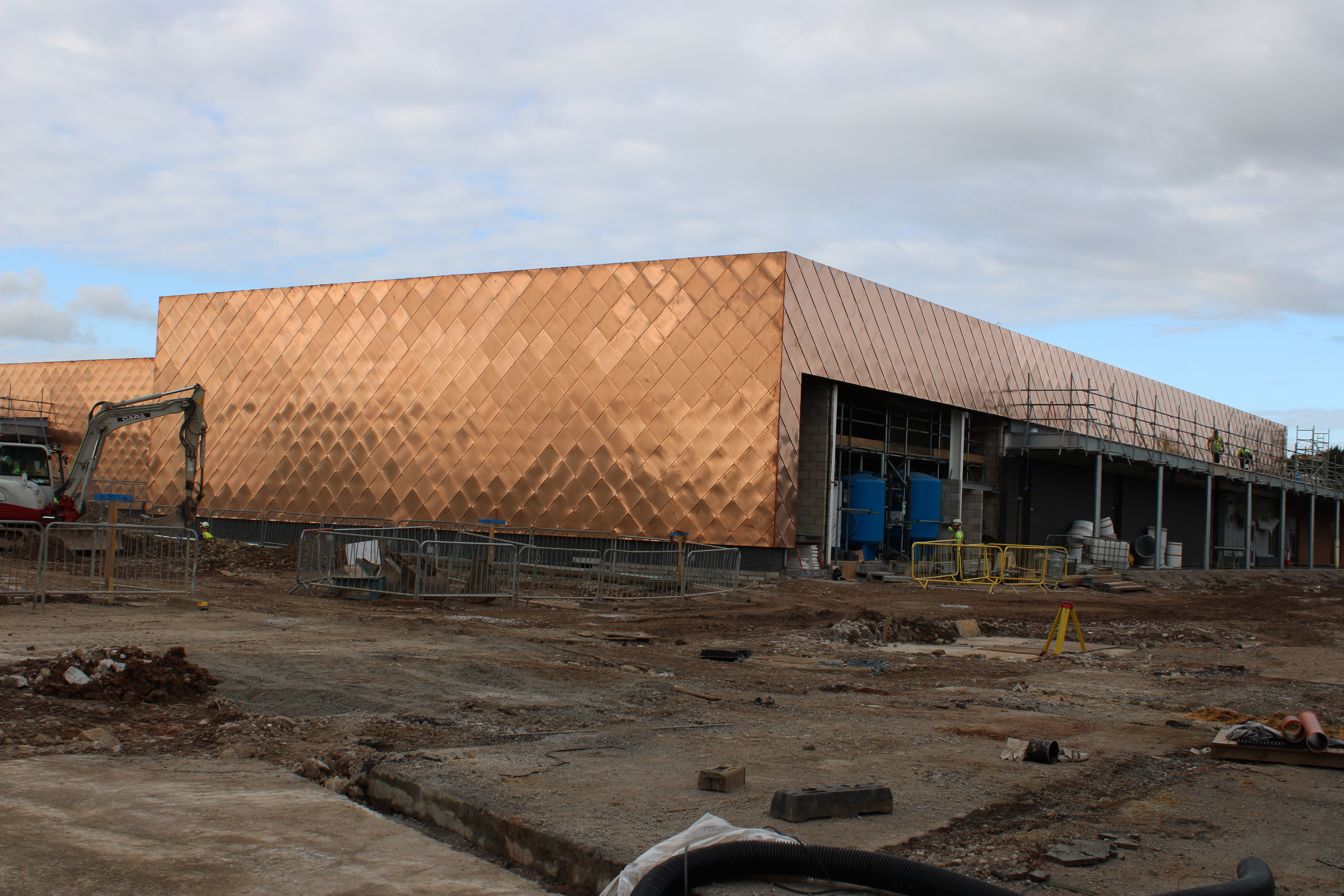

Location
- Stanley Road; Cheadle Hulme, SK8 6RQ; England

Information
- Type: Special School
- Established: 1823; 203 years ago
- Founders: Robert Phillips and William Bateman
- Local authority: Stockport
- Department for Education URN: 106166 Tables
- Ofsted: Reports
- Chair: Chris Smale
- Head of Royal School: Emma Houldcroft
- Acting Chief Executive Officer: Brandon Leigh
- Staff: 500
- Gender: Mixed
- Age: 2 to 25
- Enrolment: 109
- Website: www.seashelltrust.org.uk

Seashell Trust (formerly Royal Schools for the Deaf) is a charity in Cheadle Hulme, Greater Manchester, England, for children, young people and adults with sensory impairment, profound and multiple learning difficulties, and profound communication difficulties. It is the oldest deaf children's charity in North West England and operates Royal School Manchester and Royal College Manchester, as well as children and adult care and residential homes including a supported tenancy.

== Schools ==
The Trust's special school is called Royal School Manchester, the Trust's independent specialist college [ISC] is Royal College Manchester. In addition, the Trust also operates ten adult care homes and seven children's homes.

== History ==
The original school was established in 1823 by Robert Phillips, a Manchester merchant, with the assistance of fellow merchant William Bateman. It attained its royal status by Queen Victoria in 1897, and Queen Elizabeth II was its patron. It first opened in Salford in 1825, with 14 children, but it became necessary to move to a larger building, in Old Trafford, where the foundation stone was laid in 1836. It opened on 21 June 1837.

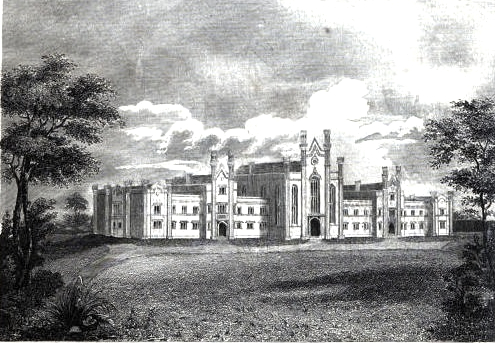
Engraving from 1838, showing the Deaf and Dumb School as the right wing of a building next to a chapel, shared with the Blind Asylum in the left wing

The school remained there until 1956, when a new campus was built in Cheadle Hulme. The school in Trafford remained open until 1982 and the charity now operates solely from the one site. The name was changed to Seashell Trust in 2008 because the former one (Royal Schools for the Deaf) was "misleading", according to governors.

In 2020, the Trust sold the green belt land it owned adjoining the school to housing developer Bloor Homes.

== Deafness impairment ==
The reference to deafness in the name of the school had become obsolete because an increasing number of the students enrolled had communication difficulties but were normally hearing. In particular, the Seashell Trust had developed considerable expertise in working with normally hearing autistic students. The deaf students now admitted by Seashell all have very complex additional needs, including visual impairments, physical difficulties and low general ability.

== Nomenclature ==
The Seashell Trust as a charity is effectively the parent body of the former Royal School for the Deaf and Communication Disorders. In changing the name of the school, it was decided to make a clear distinction between its school and its college (which occupy different parts of the campus). It was also decided to remove the reference to disability in the name. The school accepts students from preschool through to 19 years. The college runs a three-year programme, usually commencing when a student is 19 years old.
