= St James' Catholic High School, Stockport =

St James' Catholic High School

Location
- St James’ Way; Cheadle Hulme, Greater Manchester, SK8 6PZ; England; 53.36098°N 2.199°W

Information
- Type: Voluntary aided comprehensive
- Motto: “With God, all things are possible” Matthew 19:26
- Religious affiliation: Catholic
- Established: 1980
- Local authority: Stockport
- Specialist: Humanities
- Department for Education URN: 106142 Tables
- Ofsted: Reports
- Head teacher: Anthony Pontifex
- Gender: Co-educational
- Age: 11 to 16
- Enrolment: 803 as of March 2017
- Diocese: Shrewsbury
- Website: www.stjamescheadle.co.uk

St. James' Catholic High School, also known as St James' RC High School, is a Catholic secondary school in Cheadle Hulme, Greater Manchester, England.

== Description ==
St James' Catholic High School is smaller than the average size secondary school which became a specialist humanities college in 2004. It teaches ISCED Level 3 and 4, that is pupils between 11 and 16, there is no sixth form. The majority of students come from White British backgrounds and very few students speak English as an additional language. The proportion of students known to be eligible for free school meals is below average. The school is a locally designated centre for students who have a physical disability; the proportion of pupils with a statement of special education needs is above average.

The school has achieved Healthy School Status and has Eco-Schools and International School awards. In 2009 the school was recognised as a High Performing Specialist School and awarded Leading Edge School Status.

== Academics ==
The school performs above the Stockport and National average in Progress 8 (0.31) and Attainment 8(54.8).

Ofsted praised the school in 2017, saying the school was good but the outcomes for the pupils were outstanding. They praised the school community, and the pupils eagerness to learn. The pupils felt safe and there was no bullying.

"This is an improving school. Pupils learn well and make excellent progress because teaching in English, mathematics and most other subjects is consistently good" Pupils, including the most able, are challenged by their work because the teachers have high expectations of them and plan work that is hard but appropriate for their ability.

In Key Stage 3, alternate year groups are taught German and French. In Key Stage 4, about a third of the year group study single sciences- while the majority do combined science.

== Pastoral matters ==
The ethos of the school is ‘To educate and develop global Catholic citizens'. Behaviour on the corridors and in class is "exemplary". Attendance overall is good in line with the national average. Pastoral managers check carefully on the reasons why individual pupils are absent. A small number of pupils with severe medical needs must often miss school to attend medical appointments and this depresses the published statistics.

== Notable former pupils ==
- Chris Chantler, professional footballer who has played for Manchester City, Carlisle United and Kilmarnock.
- Jimi Mistry, Coronation Street actor who played Kal Nazir.
- Paul Bernard, professional footballer who played for Aberdeen
- Kobbie Mainoo, professional footballer who plays for Manchester United
