= Hulme Hall Grammar School =

Private day school in Stockport, England

Location
- Beech Avenue; Stockport, Greater Manchester, SK3 8HA; England

Information
- Type: Private day school
- Motto: Seek Truth
- Established: 1928
- Local authority: Stockport Borough
- Department for Education URN: 106151 Tables
- Headmaster: Mr Dean Grierson
- Senior Deputy Head: Mrs Jackie Smith/Mr Philip Bradford
- Gender: Coeducational
- Age: 2 to 16
- Enrolment: 300
- Houses: Dunham, Lyme
- Colours: Maroon, Yellow
- Website: hulmehallschool.org

Hulme Hall Grammar School is a private co-educational school in Stockport, Greater Manchester, England. Established in 1928, there is a Pre-School and Senior School on site. It has an average of around 50 new pupils each year. The current Headmaster is Mr Dean Grierson, The Deputy Heads are; Mr Philip Bradford and Mrs Jackie Smith. The school's motto is 'Seek Truth'.

== Notable former pupils ==
Past pupils include Danish professional footballer Kasper Schmeichel, music composer and producer Daniel Liam Glyn, and British comedian, Dan Tiernan.

== Moving Site ==
During the 2016-2017 Academic Year, the school's governing body announced that the school would be moving to the old Hillcrest Grammar School site, which was originally the site of Stockport High School for Girls. Hulme Hall opened on the new site in September 2017 and the school is in the process of updating its facilities.
