= Cheadle, Greater Manchester =

Village in Greater Manchester, England

Coordinates: 53.39°N 2.21°W

Cheadle
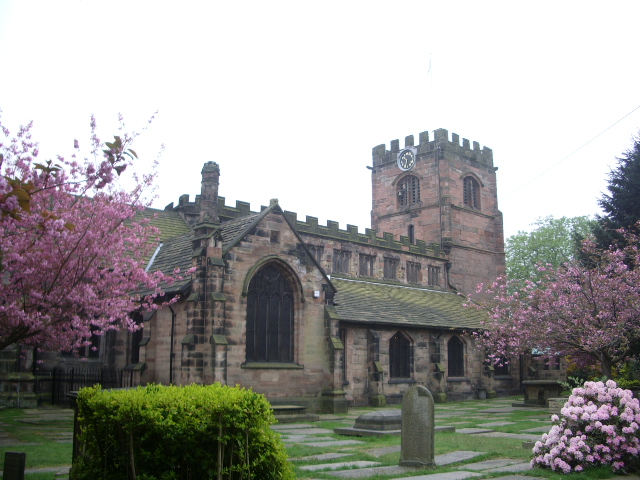
- St Mary's Church in the centre of the suburb

- Location within Greater Manchester
- Area: 3.27 km^{2} (1.26 sq mi)
- Population: 5,698
  - Density: 1,743/km^{2} (4,510/sq mi)
- OS grid reference: SJ859885
- Metropolitan borough: Stockport
- Metropolitan county: Greater Manchester
- Region: North West
- Country: England
- Sovereign state: United Kingdom
- Post town: CHEADLE
- Postcode district: SK8
- Dialling code: 0161
- Police: Greater Manchester
- Fire: Greater Manchester
- Ambulance: North West
- UK Parliament: Cheadle

Cheadle (/ˈtʃiːdəl/) is a suburban village in the Metropolitan Borough of Stockport, in Greater Manchester, England. Within the boundaries of the historic county of Cheshire, it borders Cheadle Hulme, Gatley, Heald Green and Cheadle Heath in Stockport, and East Didsbury in Manchester. In 2011, it had a population of 14,698.

== Etymology ==
The name of the village is first attested in the Domesday Book of 1086, in the form Cedde; from the twelfth century onwards it appears in forms such as Chedle, Chedlee, Chedlegh and Chelle. The second part of the name is agreed to come from the Old English word lēah ("clearing in woodland". The first part is usually agreed to come from the Common Brittonic word that survives in modern Welsh as coed ("wood"). However, it is possible that it originated instead in the Old English word cēod ("a bag, a bag-like hollow").

== History ==
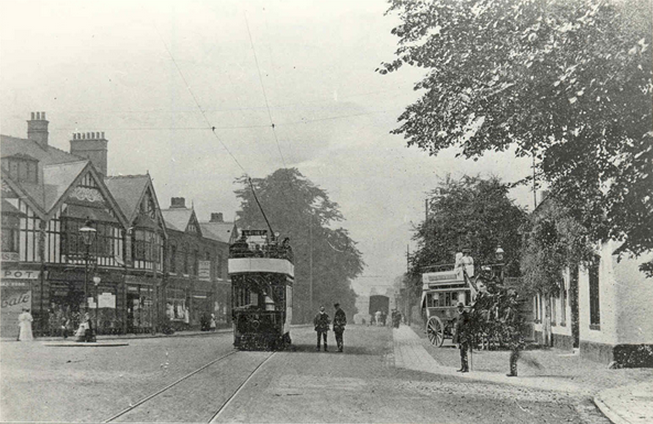
Gatley Road, in 1908

There has been human occupation in the area that is now Cheadle since prehistoric times. The earliest evidence of civilisation is of burial mounds dating from the Iron Age, belonging to Celts who occupied Britain. Later, the area was occupied by Brigantes, whose activity was discovered in the form of axe fragments.

In the first millennium, Romans occupied the area and some of their coins have been discovered since. During the seventh century, St. Chad preached in the area. A stone cross dedicated to him was found close to the confluence of the river Mersey and Micker Brook in 1873.

It was held by Gamel, a free Saxon under Hugh d'Avranches, 1st Earl of Chester; it was about three miles long and half as wide, containing both wooded and open land, with areas enclosed for hunting purposes. This early manor occupied the approximate areas of both modern day Cheadle and Cheadle Hulme.

By June 1294, Geoffrey de Chedle was lord of the manor which was valued at about £20 per annum. Geoffrey's descendant Robert (or Roger) died in the early 1320s, leaving the estate to his wife Matilda who held it until her death in 1326. As there were no male heirs the manor, which was now worth £30 per annum, was divided between her daughters, Clemence and Agnes. Agnes inherited the northern half,which would later become the modern-day Cheadle, and Clemence inherited the southern half, latterly Cheadle Hulme. The two areas became known as "Chedle Bulkeley" and "Chedle Holme" respectively.

William de Bulkeley succeeded his mother and was a participant in several wars in France for Edward, the Black Prince. His son, Richard, was sent to live at the court Richard II and later to a baron whose daughter Margery married Richard. Richard died at the age of 21, then Margery married secondly without royal permission to Sir Randle Mainwaring. Margery lived until she was around 90 years old, then was succeeded by her grandson and great-grandson, both named William. Shortly after the Battle of Bosworth, the latter William was succeeded by his brother Richard.

During the reign of Henry VIII, the current St Mary's Church on High Street was built. There has been a church on the site since the 12th century, the original being constructed of wood, but it was rebuilt in stone between 1520 and 1550. The church contains an effigy of John Stanley who, along with many other men from the area, fought in the Battle of Flodden. Later, he claimed the manor for himself, but was imprisoned by Thomas Wolsey who ensured the land went to its rightful owner.

The Bulkeleys continued to hold the lands as lords of the manor until the 18th century, when the manor was purchased by Thomas Egerton.

Moseley Old Hall, an early Stuart mansion dating from 1666 is still standing and is owned privately.

Abney Hall is a late Victorian hall from 1847 and was used as the Cheadle town hall from 1959 until 1974: it is now used for offices. It is surrounded by parkland which is open to the public all year round and features some of the only wetlands left in Stockport.

Cheadle grew rapidly during the Industrial Revolution, when it was used as a stopping point for travellers and merchants on their way to central Manchester.

== Geography ==
Cheadle is a suburban village in the Metropolitan Borough of Stockport, Greater Manchester; it lies 3 miles (4.8 km) from Stockport town centre and 8 miles (13 km) from Manchester city centre. Cheadle lies on the Cheshire Plain, in the final meander of the Ladybrook Valley before it joins the river Mersey to the north. Its geology is boulder clay and gravels; the parkland of Abney Hall to the north is on the flood plain of the Mersey.

== Governance ==
There is one main tier of local government covering Cheadle at metropolitan borough level, Stockport Metropolitan Borough Council. The council is a member of the Greater Manchester Combined Authority, which is led by the directly-elected Mayor of Greater Manchester.

Since 1950, the suburb has been part of the Cheadle parliamentary constituency.

=== Administrative history ===
Cheadle was an ancient parish in the Macclesfield Hundred of Cheshire; it was subdivided into three townships: Cheadle Bulkeley, Cheadle Moseley and Handforth. From the 13th century, the parish also included a detached area called Bosden, which included the eastern side of Hazel Grove and was surrounded by Stockport parish. Bosden was administered as part of the Handforth township, which was thereafter sometimes known as 'Handforth-cum-Bosden'.

The Bulkeley and Moseley townships had complicated boundaries with each other; both included part of Cheadle and each had numerous detached parts, surrounded by the other township. The hamlet of Cheadle Hulme was in the Moseley township. Both townships also included areas on the western edge of the town of Stockport, known as the hamlets of Brinksway and Edgeley. In 1832, the hamlets of Brinksway and Edgeley were included in the Stockport parliamentary constituency. Stockport's borough boundary was enlarged to match the constituency in 1836.

From the 17th century onwards, parishes were gradually given various civil functions under the poor laws, in addition to their original ecclesiastical functions. In some cases, including Cheadle, the civil functions were exercised by each township rather than the parish as a whole. In 1866, the legal definition of 'parish' was changed to be the areas used for administering the poor laws, and so Cheadle Bulkeley, Cheadle Moseley and Handforth-cum-Bosden became separate civil parishes, which therefore diverged from the ecclesiastical parish. Cheadle Bulkeley and Cheadle Moseley were merged into a single township and civil parish called Cheadle in 1879.

In 1886, a local government district called Cheadle and Gatley was created, administered by an elected local board. The district covered the Stockport Etchells township, in which Gatley was the main settlement, plus the parts of the township of Cheadle that lay outside the borough boundaries of Stockport. Local government districts were reconstituted as urban districts under the Local Government Act 1894. The 1894 Act also directed that civil parishes could no longer straddle district or borough boundaries, so Cheadle parish was reduced to just cover just the area within the Cheadle and Gatley Urban District.

In 1888, Cheadle and Gatley was divided into four electoral wards: Adswood, Cheadle, Cheadle Hulme and Gatley. There were some adjustments to the boundaries with neighbouring Wilmslow and Handforth in 1901, and the wards were restructured again, splitting Cheadle Hulme into north and south, and merging in Adswood. Due to the fast-paced growth of the district, the wards were again restructured in 1930, with the addition of Heald Green. The Cheadle and Stockport Etchells civil parishes were merged in 1930 into a single civil parish called Cheadle and Gatley covering the whole urban district. In 1921, in the last census before its abolition, the Cheadle civil parish had a population of 8,845. In 1940, the wards were redefined again as Adswood, Cheadle East, Cheadle West, Cheadle Hulme North, Cheadle Hulme South, Gatley and Heald Green.

Cheadle and Gatley Urban District was abolished in 1974, under the Local Government Act 1972. The area became part of the Metropolitan Borough of Stockport, in Greater Manchester.

== Transport ==
Cheadle's public transport is currently confined to bus services provided by several operators, predominantly Stagecoach Manchester. Routes connect the suburb with Stockport, Altrincham, Bramhall and Didsbury.

The locality was served between 1866 until 1964 by a Cheshire Lines Committee railway station, initially called Cheadle and then Cheadle North from 1950, which was situated 600 yards (550 m) north of the village on the west side of Manchester Road. It was also served, from 1866 until 1917, by Cheadle LNWR, a London & North Western Railway station located next to the railway overbridge, near the centre of the village. Both stations were on lines between Altrincham to Stockport.

There are now advanced plans to build a new station in Cheadle, on the Mid-Cheshire line between Altrincham and Stockport. The station facilities will be built on the car park of the Alexandra Hospital, near to where the former LNWR station was sited. Although it has been approved formally, the expected completion date is currently uncertain.

Nearby stations, with services operated by Northern Trains, are located at:

- Gatley (approximately 1 mile (1.6 km) west of Cheadle), Heald Green and East Didsbury on the Styal Line between Wilmslow, Manchester Airport and Manchester Piccadilly
- Cheadle Hulme, on a spur of the West Coast Main Line, with services from Crewe and Stoke-on-Trent to Manchester Piccadilly.

Cheadle lies on the A560 between Stockport and Chester; it and borders on the A34. It is accessed by junctions 2 and 3 of the M60 Manchester Orbital motorway.

The suburb is located approximately 4 miles (6.4 km) from Manchester Airport.

== Housing ==
A number of houses in Cheadle that were built in the 1800s still stand today, in a conservation area in the centre of the village.

There is also a Manchester overspill council estate that was constructed shortly after the Second World War to rehouse families from the Victorian slums of inner-city Manchester. In April 2008, these homes were transferred to a housing association, Mossbank Homes.

== Education ==
The following educational establishments are in Cheadle:

Primary schools:

- Cheadle
- Ladybridge
- Meadowbank.

Secondary school:

- The Kingsway School.

Special education:

- Together Trust, made up of Child and Youth Care Education Service (CYCES) and Inscape House.

Independent school:

- Lady Barn House School.

== Economy ==
Cheadle is home to the headquarters of sportswear giants Umbro.

The head office of Nord Anglia Education was sited here.

Currently Cheadle is home to the UK head office of the largest global provider of high school exchange, Educatius.

== Sport ==
The village's football club is Cheadle Town F.C. that plays in the North West Counties Football League.

== Notable people ==
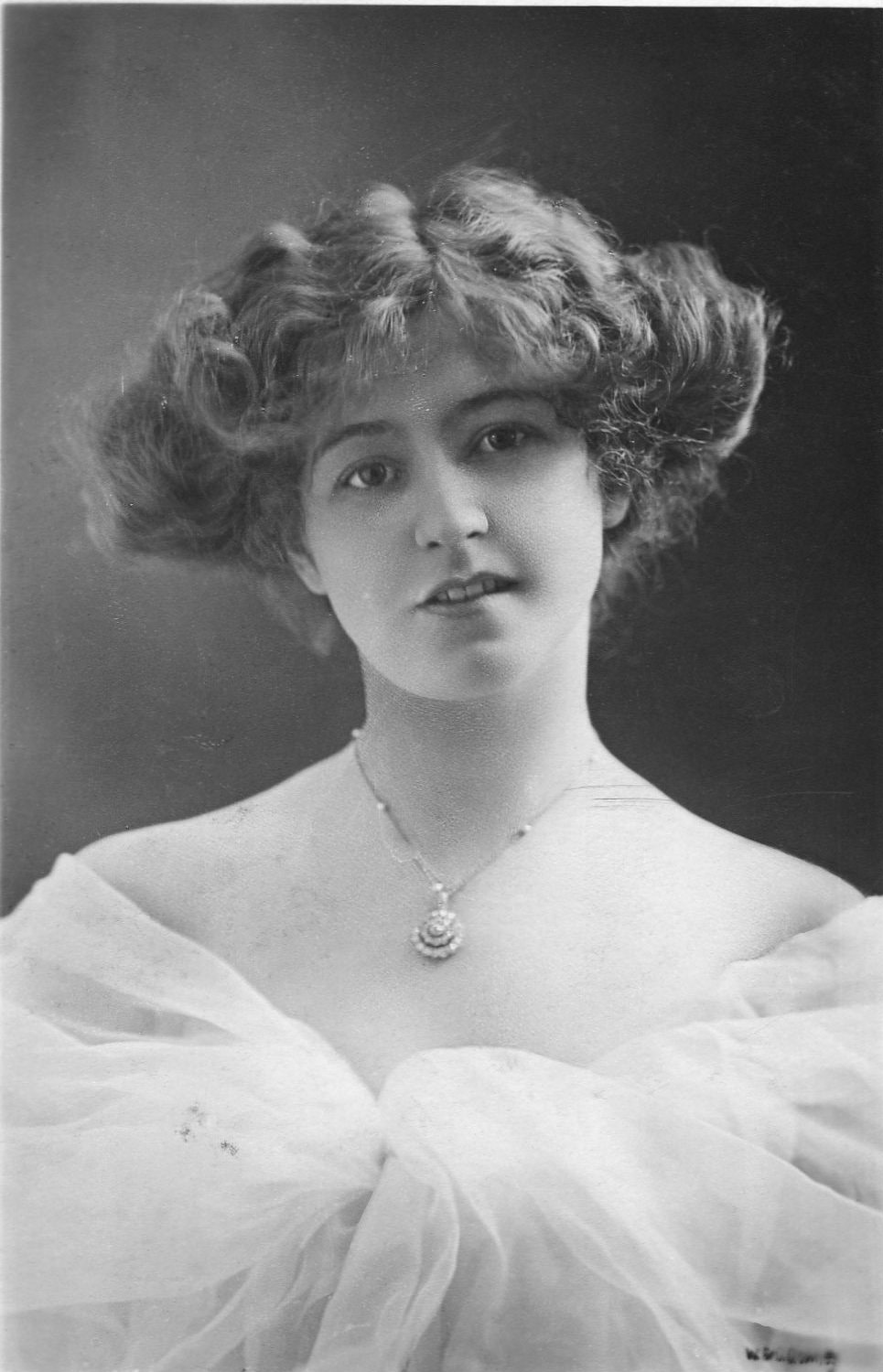
Gabrielle Ray, early 1900s

- Sir Norman Kendal (1880–1966) barrister and Assistant Commissioner of Police of the Metropolis
- Gabrielle Ray (1883–1973), a stage actress, dancer and singer, played in Edwardian musical comedies.
- Air Commodore Henry Probert (1926–2007), RAF officer, historian and RAF director of education 1976–1978.
- Christopher Priest (born 1943) novelist and science fiction writer.
- Diana Darvey (1945–2000), actress, singer and dancer, appeared in The Benny Hill Show
- Nigel Williams (born 1948) novelist, screenwriter and playwright.
- Adam Thomas (born 1988) actor and local business owner, played Adam Barton in Emmerdale (2009–2018).
- Simon Gregson (born 1974) actor, played Steve McDonald in Coronation Street
- Lauren Drummond (born 1988), actress.

=== Sport ===
- Henry Pickford (1880 – not known), first-class cricketer, played in 11 first-class cricket games
- Jeff Whitefoot (1933–2024) former footballer, 374 pro appearances including 255 for Nottingham Forest
- John Herety (born 1958) former racing cyclist, competed for Great Britain in the 1980 Summer Olympics
- Damien Allen (born 1986) footballer, over 230 pro appearances, currently playing for Aberystwyth Town F.C.
- Paul Ennis (born 1990), footballer who has played 231 games for F.C. United of Manchester
- Kobbie Mainoo (born 2005), footballer for Manchester United and England.

== See also ==
- Cheadle (UK Parliament constituency)
- Listed buildings in Cheadle and Gatley.
