= Heald Green =

Suburb of Stockport, Greater Manchester, England

Coordinates: 53.3804°N 2.2290°W

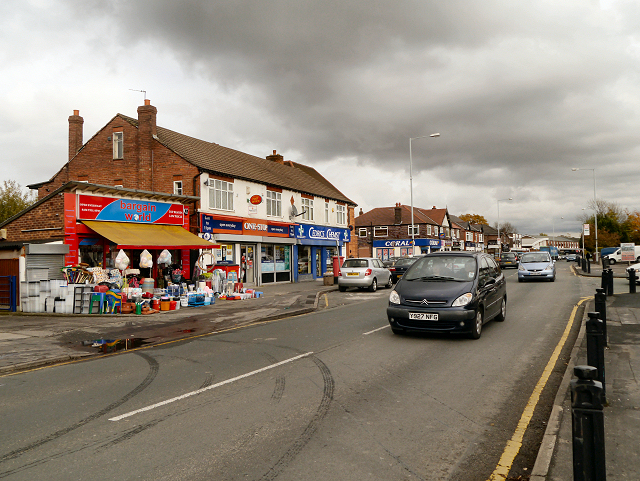
- Finney Lane in Heald Green (2012)

- Location within Greater Manchester
- Area: 4.41 km^{2} (1.70 sq mi)
- Population: 12,640
  - Density: 2,866/km^{2} (7,420/sq mi)
- Metropolitan borough: Stockport
- Metropolitan county: Greater Manchester
- Region: North West
- Country: England
- Sovereign state: United Kingdom
- Post town: CHEADLE
- Postcode district: SK8
- Dialling code: 0161
- Police: Greater Manchester
- Fire: Greater Manchester
- Ambulance: North West
- UK Parliament: Cheadle

Heald Green is a suburb in the Metropolitan Borough of Stockport, Greater Manchester, England. It lies south-west of Stockport, near Manchester Airport, bordered by Gatley to the north, Cheadle to the north-east, Cheadle Hulme to the east, Stanley Green to the south-east, Handforth to the south, Styal to the south-west, and Moss Nook and Peel Hall to the west.

== Population ==
At the 2001 Census, Heald Green had a population of 12,640, of whom 6,520 (51.6%) were female and 6,120 (48.4%) male; 2,494 (19.7%) were aged 16 and under, and 2,409 (19.1%) aged 65 and over.

Heald Green compared
2001 UK Census	Heald Green	Stockport	England
Total population	12,640	284,528	49,138,831
White	90.5%	95.7%	90.9%
Asian	7%	2.1%	4.6%
Black	0.4%	0.4%	2.3%

== Transport ==
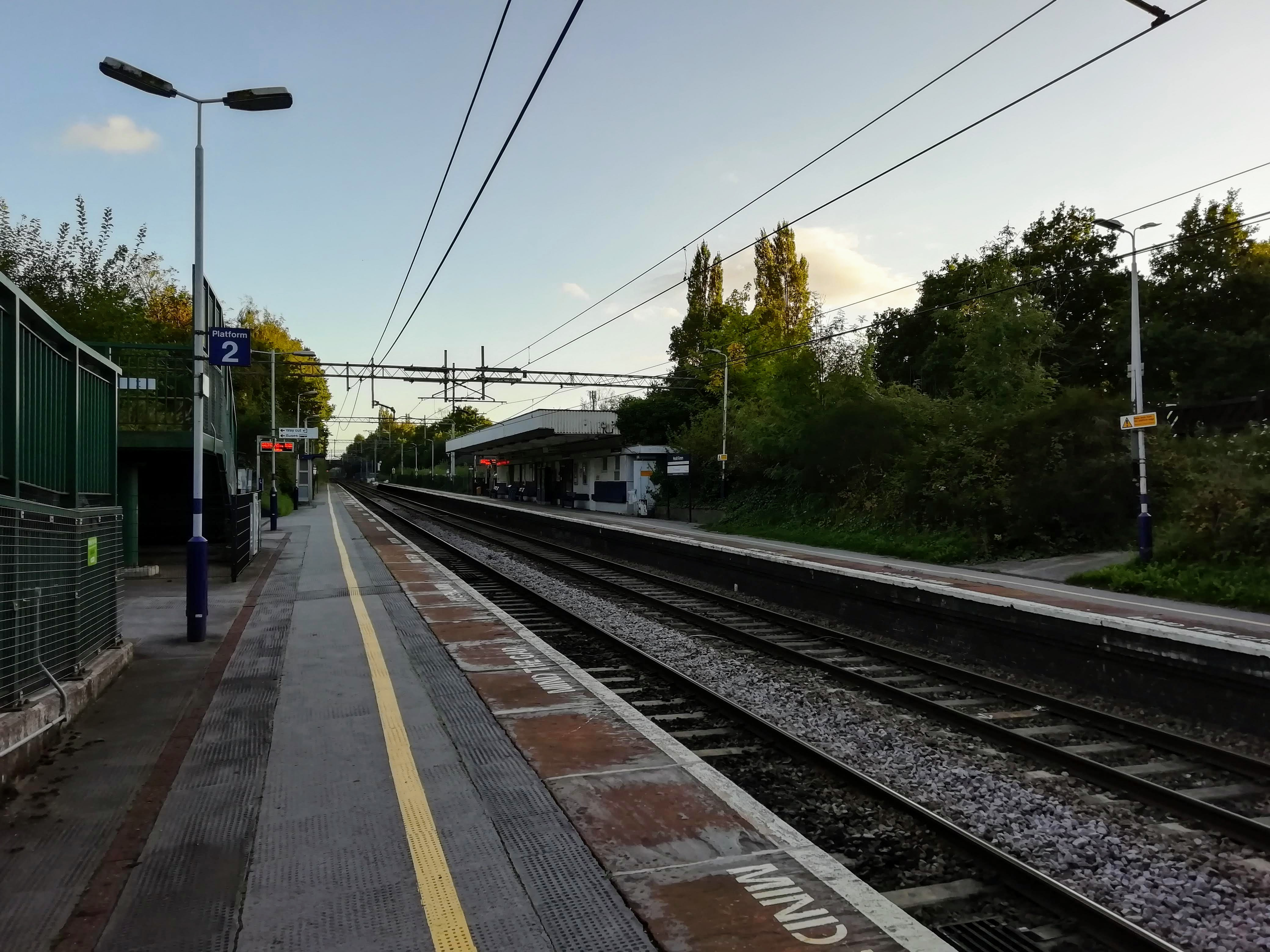
Heald Green station, looking south towards Styal

Heald Green railway station is a stop on the Styal line, which provides regular services to Manchester Piccadilly, Manchester Airport, Liverpool Lime Street, Crewe and Blackpool North.

Local bus services are operated by Stagecoach Manchester, Metroline Manchester, Diamond Bus North West and D&G Bus; routes connect the suburb with Stockport, Cheadle, Cheadle Hulme, Handforth Dean, Macclesfield and Manchester Airport.

== See also ==
- Listed buildings in Cheadle and Gatley
