= Gatley =

Suburb of Stockport, in Greater Manchester, England

Coordinates: 53.3929°N 2.2446°W

- Town
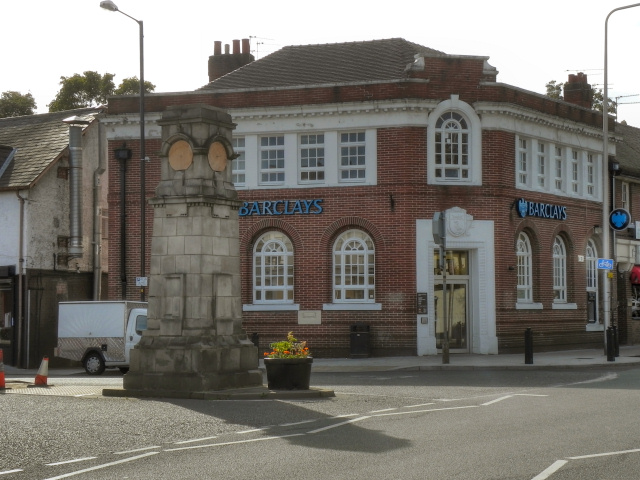
- Gatley War Memorial in 2011

- Location within Greater Manchester
- Area: 3.27 km^{2} (1.26 sq mi)
- Population: 9,000
  - Density: 2,752/km^{2} (7,130/sq mi)
- Metropolitan borough: Metropolitan Borough of Stockport
- Metropolitan county: Greater Manchester
- Region: North West
- Country: England
- Sovereign state: United Kingdom
- Post town: CHEADLE
- Postcode district: SK8
- Dialling code: 0161
- Police: Greater Manchester
- Fire: Greater Manchester
- Ambulance: North West
- UK Parliament: Cheadle

Gatley is a suburb of the town of Stockport, in Greater Manchester, England. It lies 6 miles (10 km) south of Manchester city centre, 4 miles (6 km) west-south-west of Stockport, 5 miles (8 km) east of Altrincham and 3 miles (5 km) north-east of Manchester Airport.

== History ==
=== Toponymy ===
Within the boundaries of the historic county of Cheshire, Gatley was known as Gateclyve in 1290, which in Middle English means "a place where goats are kept".

=== Early history ===
Until the 20th century, most Gatley residents either worked in the material trades or were farmers. An open field system existed around Gatley in the late 17th century, but the practice of common farming seems to have fallen into disuse when William Tatton allowed tenants to buy their own land.

Gatley Carrs was the lower, marshy ground running down to the River Mersey and west to Northenden. Before 1700, it was a place for osier beds which local people had used for basket making or for wattles for cottages or fencing.

In 1800, Mr Worthington of Sharston Hall planted 1,000 poplars in Gatley Carrs. In the mid 19th century, Gatley Carrs was described as "a scene of such singular and romantic beauty, and so thoroughly unique in its composition, that we know nothing in the neighbourhood to liken it to".

Over the years, Gatley Carrs has shrunk to a small part of its former size. In the second half of the 18th century, the Carrs was largely enclosed and partially drained to form farmed meadows. The Stockport-Altrincham railway line cut across it in 1864, running east–west. In 1934, house building began on High Terrace of the Mersey (Note: This is the development behind the Horse and Farrier pub, running down to the railway line) and also about that time Cheadle and Gatley UDC purchased 19 acres (77,000 m^{2}) to use as a refuse tip. Tree planting commenced due to complaints of smells and rats. There was loss of original field pattern because of extensive refuse tipping.

Carr Woodland was developed on what had been Carr Meadows. There was a major system of land drains identified on the 1934 map, including a sluice and non-return outfall gate to protect Gatley Carr from flooding when the river Mersey burst its banks.

In the mid-1960s, land restoration took place, although the Carr was only covered with soil to a depth varying between 2 inches (51 mm) and 6 inches (150 mm). Gatley Carrs then fell to the management of the Mersey Valley Countryside wardens, until it was handed to Stockport MBC in the late 1990s.

=== Industrial history ===
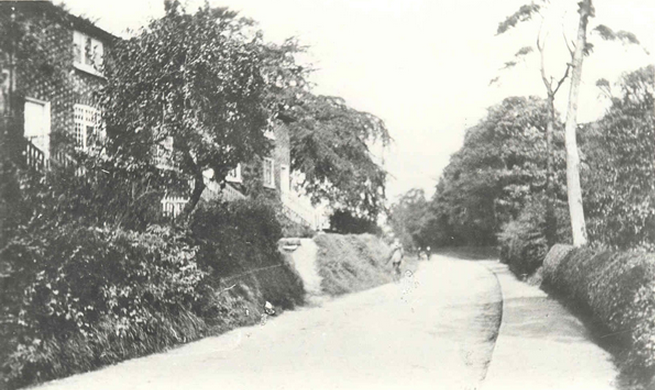
Styal Road, Gatley, 1913

Button making appears to have been a significant local trade in the 17th and 18th centuries. A "button man" (merchant selling buttons) is recorded in Gatley in the 1660s. This continued in the 18th century, with three button men being mentioned in Gatley between 1735 and 1779.

People living around Gatley Green were mostly hand loom weavers and became more dependent on textile manufacture. Their cottages had cellars for storage and well-lit upper rooms for the looms.

About 1750, William Roscoe from Bolton built a factory near Gatley Hall. (Note: This shouldn't be confused in scale with the cotton mills such as those at Styal; it appears to have been a place for hand weaving and was later converted into a farmhouse, so it was a very modest affair.) Up to at least 1841, John Alcock was a textile manufacturer in Gatley, using the Roscoe factory for at least part of the period.

The spread of machinery in industrial manufacturers during the 19th century appears to have killed off industry in Gatley, before which it was a "very busy and important place, as a centre for weaving, spinning, shoemaking and fustian cutting." Handloom weaving may have survived in the area to as late as the 1880s (Melson's Directory of Cheadle, Northenden and Baguley, 1887.)

=== Halls and houses ===
In 1714, Stone Pale Hall was reconstructed in Gatley.

Gatley Hall and Gatley Hill House may both have been built in the mid-18th century by local cotton manufacturers; the latter is now council-owned by Stockport MBC and is used by various community groups. The mansion High Grove House was built for a member of a wealthy hatting family of Yorkshire and Manchester.

=== Conflict ===
In the English Civil War (1642–51), the Tatton family, along with the local rectors and most tenants, were Royalists. Wythenshawe Hall was kept in a state of defence from 1642, with Parliamentary forces nearby in Handforth and Duckinfield; it was taken by the Parliamentarian forces on 25 February 1644. Three Gatley men were in the garrison defending the hall: Ralphe Savage, Robert Torkinton and John Blomiley.

On 30 November 1745, about 55 Jacobite troops from Bonnie Prince Charlie's army crossed Gatley Ford and Gatley Carrs on their way to Cheadle and Stockport; the bulk of the army crossed the Mersey at Cheadle and Stockport that night and the following day. Having reached Derby but no further, the Jacobite troops were back in Stockport in the second week of December on their way back north.

Gatley residents joined the Luddite riots in 1818, but without any great distinction. They drilled in Gatley Carrs before marching to Stockport to take arms from the soldiers, but returned without actually attempting to do so. In the summer of 1819, soldiers formed square in front of the Horse and Farrier public house in Gatley with the aim of arresting the Luddite ringleaders. Several ran away and hid; one, Isaac Legh, in the chimney of Stone Pale House, two others in the Carrs.

=== Religion and churches ===
A nonconformist meeting house, registered in Etchells in 1722, may have been a house in Gatley. This house may have been in weavers' cottages on Styal Road. In 1777, the Gatley Congregational Church was founded and an independent chapel was built in Old Hall Road, following the spread of evangelicalism to nonconformist groups. A full-time minister was employed by the non-conformists for the first time. The present church is on Elm Road.

The first non-conformist minister was the Rev. Jeremiah Pendlebury, succeeded by his assistant, the Rev. Samuel Turner, in 1788. By 1860, the church congregation had fallen to eight people; improvements made with help from the North Cheshire Rural Mission increased the congregation to 60.

Prior to 1875, Gatley's parish church was the Church of St. Thomas, 3 miles (5 km) away in Stockport. The people of Gatley rarely saw their parish priest, though they still had to pay their tithes.

The new church, St. James', was built of local handmade bricks and consecrated on 6 December 1881. The Rev. Percy M. Herford was the first vicar of St. James' Church. In 1888, the Rev. P.M. Herford left and was replaced by the Rev. John Bruster, who remained in position for 40 years and retired in 1928.

The vicarage was completed in 1894, following a donation of £100 from Mr W. Heald of Parrswood in 1889. The building is located a short walk away from the church on Northenden Road. The building was sold in 2007 and is now a private nursery.

Yeshurun Hebrew Congregation, a Modern Orthodox synagogue, opened in 1968.

Today, the suburb is home to three churches: St. James' (CofE), Bethany Elim Pentecostal and Gatley United Reformed Church.

== Geography ==
Gatley is the most westerly vicinity of the Metropolitan Borough of Stockport; it runs along the border of Stockport and Manchester. Until 1974, it was within Cheshire as a suburban township of Cheadle; it is separated from its slightly larger neighbour by the A34 and from Didsbury by the M60 motorway and the River Mersey.

To the south, Gatley borders onto Heald Green, with Grasmere Road and Yew Tree Grove marking the southern boundary. To the west and north-west, it meets Wythenshawe, with roads bordering onto Hollyhedge Park (Note: i.e. Ogden Grove, Malverne Avenue, Charnville Road, Cranston Grove, Mount Grove and 99 Altrincham Road) being the last in Gatley; Longley Lane and the M56 motorway marking the north-western boundary.

Gatley lies 130–200 feet above sea level.

== Governance ==
There is one main tier of local government covering Gatley, at metropolitan borough level: Stockport Metropolitan Borough Council. The council is a member of the Greater Manchester Combined Authority, which is led by the directly-elected Mayor of Greater Manchester.

=== Administrative history ===
Prior to 1086, Gatley was probably unpopulated and was part of an area known as Etchells (meaning 'additional cleared land'). After 1086, the area was split between two landowners and, for a period, Gatley Brook (the old hundred boundary) formed the boundary. The halves were, at various times, held by the Stokeports and the Ardernes, then later by the Stanleys until, in 1508, the heir John Stanley was killed by a tennis ball. With no rightful claimants, the land went to the crown and, in 1556, Etchells was sold to William Tatton. By the 1560s, the Tattons, who also owned Northenden and other local land, became full lords of the manor and held court over the area.

The Etchells area was then administratively split between two townships: Stockport Etchells in the parish of Stockport and Northen Etchells in the parish of Northenden, with Gatley Brook serving as the boundary. The township of Stockport Etchells covered Gatley and much of the area now in Heald Green. From the late 16th century, the local court leets and manorial courts were held at a building that later became known as the Old Court House in Gatley, although it was probably primarily an inn at the time.

In 1886, a local government district called Cheadle and Gatley was created, administered by an elected local board. The district covered the Stockport Etchells township (in which Gatley was the main settlement) plus the parts of the township of Cheadle that were outside the municipal borough boundaries of Stockport. Local government districts were reconstituted as urban districts under the Local Government Act 1894.

In 1933–34, both Manchester and Stockport wanted to annex the Cheadle and Gatley Urban District. An opinion poll of nearly 10,000 residents recorded near-unanimous support for continuing independence.

In 1936, the boundaries of the Cheadle and Gatley Urban District saw minor changes, taking in a small area from the abolished Handforth Urban District, the majority of which went to Wilmslow. Cheadle and Gatley Urban District was abolished in 1974 under the Local Government Act 1972. The area became part of the Metropolitan Borough of Stockport in Greater Manchester. Some roads in the western side of Gatley (containing around 500 homes) were a part of the City of Manchester until the early 1990s when residents launched a successful application to the Boundaries Commission to enable Gatley in its entirety to become a part of Stockport.

== Demography ==
The current population of Gatley is approximately 9,000.

=== Historical population changes ===
Population of Stockport Etchells
Year	Pop.	±%
1664	238	—
1754	380	+59.7%
1801	623	+63.9%
1811	627	+0.6%
1821	749	+19.5%
1831	701	−6.4%
1841	749	+6.8%
1851	805	+7.5%
1861	860	+6.8%
1871	977	+13.6%
1881	1,369	+40.1%

Population of Cheadle & Gatley UD
Year	Pop.	±%
1891	8,252	—
1901	10,820	+31.1%
1911	9,913	−8.4%
1921	11,036	+11.3%
1931	18,473	+67.4%
1951	31,511	+70.6%
1961	45,621	+44.8%
1971	60,799	+33.3%

A polished stone found in Gatley suggests some human presence in the Neolithic or early Bronze Age.

In 1286, Gatley was a hamlet within the manor of Stockport Etchells, contained at least six households (around 30 individuals); it was probably a significant growth from levels in the late 11th century.

An Etchells Court of Survey document, probably from the late 16th century, gives Gatley as having 16 tenants (households) including Thomas Whitelegg (the largest holding, 25 acres), Roberte Gooddyer, Arnoulde Baxter and Roger Royle.

Cheadle and Gatley Urban District saw the highest population growth of anywhere in Stockport in the inter-war period. In 1921, its population was a little over 11,000; by 1931, it was 18,500 and 27,000 by 1939. Cheadle, Gatley and Cheadle Hulme all saw an increase, as did the previously rural area of Heald Green. This growth was largely due to people moving out of Manchester into the area.

=== Religion ===
Gatley Compared: Religion
UK Census 2001	Gatley and Cheadle	Stockport	England
Total population	14,261	284,528	49,138,831
Christian	68.02%	73.45%	71.74%
No religion	11.16%	14.18%	14.59%
Jewish	6.37%	0.58%	0.52%
Muslim	5.06%	1.75%	3.10%
Hindu	1.18%	0.47%	1.11%
Sikh	0.27%	0.07%	0.67%
Buddhist	0.25%	0.21%	0.28%
Other	0.67%	0.23%	0.29%
Not stated	7.01%	7.09%	7.69%

The religious diversity in Gatley and Cheadle is similar to that of the country as a whole. Most notable is the relatively high Jewish population, over ten times higher than the English and Stockport averages. This is reflected in the existence of Gatley's orthodox synagogue, the Menorah reform synagogue in neighbouring Sharston and the North Cheshire Jewish Primary School in Heald Green.

The Muslim population is higher than the average across England and similar to neighbouring Didsbury. Bangladeshi make up the majority of this group.

The data in the table refers to the Cheadle and Gatley ward. The data comes from the 2001 UK census, when the ward name was Cheadle which encompassed the whole of Gatley and a large part of Cheadle. Gatley has never been an administrative district in its own right and no data for Gatley alone exists.

=== Ethnicity ===
Gatley Compared: Place of birth
UK Census 2001	Gatley and Cheadle	Stockport	England
Total population	14,261	284,528	49,138,831
Born in England	87.83%	91.81%	87.44%
Born elsewhere in UK	3.53%	3.17%	3.3%
Born elsewhere in EU	1.79%	1.6%	2.35%
Born outside EU	6.68%	3.22%	6.91%

== Economy and employment ==
Gatley's primary commercial area covers Church Road, Stonepail Road, Gatley Road, Northenden Road and Old Hall Road. There are over 40 shops, including take-aways, hairdressers, beauty salons, restaurants, pubs, cafes and a bike shop, with significant office space and additional units. Gatley has three smaller areas of local shops on Pendlebury Road, Foxland Road and Silverdale Road, each with between two and six commercial premises.

There are also three small-medium-sized office blocks (on Northenden Road, Park Road and Stonepail Road) which house various businesses.

== Transport ==
=== Railway ===
Gatley railway station lies on the Styal Line, which runs between Longsight (Slade Lane Junction) and Wilmslow. Northern Trains operates regular services to Manchester Piccadilly, Manchester Airport, Crewe, Liverpool Lime Street and Preston.

=== Buses ===
Bus services in the area are operated predominantly by Stagecoach Manchester. Key routes include:

- 11: between Altrincham and Stockport, via Timperley, Baguley, Wythenshawe and Cheadle.
- 370/1: between Altrincham and Stockport, via Timperley, Baguley and Cheadle.

=== Road ===
Gatley is close to both the M60 Manchester Orbital motorway and to the eastern terminus of the M56, which connects south Manchester with North Wales and the Wirral Peninsula.

=== History ===
The river Mersey was not bridged in this area until 1745 (and then not continuously, as three bridges collapsed over the years) so travelling to Didsbury meant fording the Mersey or crossing in a boat. Until the railway arrived in 1864, the road from Didsbury to Gatley (and then on to Styal) forded the Mersey and came through Gatley Carrs. The Gatley Ford was near Didsbury's Millgate Lane, suggesting the river was forded somewhere near the current M56/M60 junction.

Turnpikes opened across Stockport from 1725, with the road through Gatley being amongst the last in 1820. This was the main road through Cheadle, Gatley, Altrincham and Northwich. By July 1822, the fast coach along the road from Stockport to Liverpool, via Warrington, made it possible to spend six hours in Liverpool and return on the same day.

Gatley had no public transport until 1896, when a postmaster started a cab service. In 1898, Mr Potts began to operate a service to Stockport with a single (horse drawn) omnibus, continuing until the arrival of the electric tram in 1904. Electric trams began to run in Stockport in 1902, with the service to Gatley (terminating at the Horse and Farrier) opening in March 1904. In Gatley, trams were replaced by buses in 1931. The trams were not wholly reliable; broken rear axles were common and the trams often disengaged from the electric cable.

The LNWR railway station at Cheadle allowed travel via Edgeley to Manchester, but closed as early as 1917 due to competition with the electric tram between Gatley and Stockport. LNWR opened the Styal Line in 1909, including Gatley (as Gatley for Cheadle until 1974) and Heald Green railway stations.

The M56 and M63 (now part of the M60) were opened in 1974, bypassing Gatley and joining with each other at Kingsway; the latter had been extended south across the river Mersey in 1959.

The Manchester Metrolink was extended to Manchester Airport in 2014, including Benchill stop, which is approx one mile from Gatley.

== Education ==
Gatley has three nurseries and the following three state schools:

- Gatley Primary School is situated on Hawthorn Road. It has approximately 460 pupils aged 5–11 and received an overall "outstanding" rating by Ofsted in 2024.
- Lum Head Primary School is situated in Troutbeck Road and was opened on 1 September 1965. In September 2025, it had 223 pupils in the age range of 3–11. It was given an overall "good" rating by Ofsted in 2019.
- The Kingsway School was formed in 1983, following the merger of Broadway Boys School and Kingsway Girls School. It is now a mixed school specialising in mathematics, computing and science. It is situated on two sites: Foxland Road in Gatley and Broadway in Cheadle, on opposite sides of the A34, linked by a pedestrian subway. The school was rated "required improvement" by Ofsted in 2023.

== Landmarks and park areas ==
=== War memorial and clock tower ===
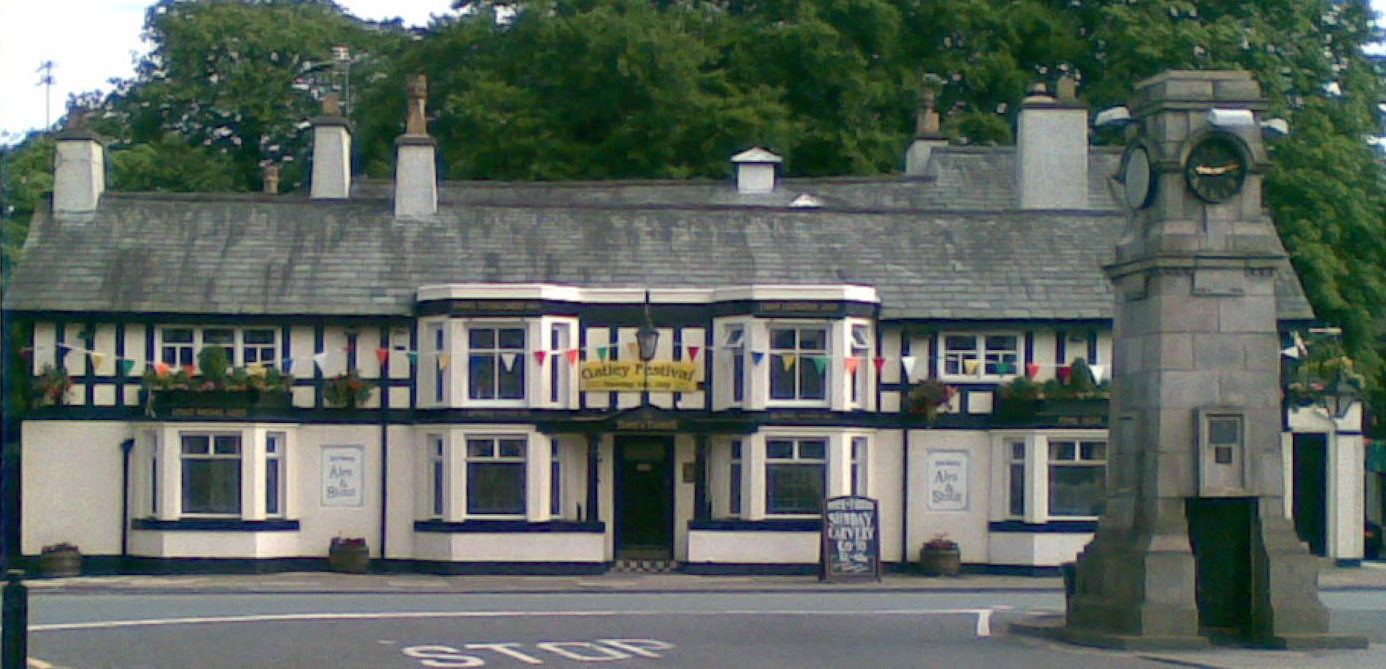
First World War Memorial Clock Tower in front of the Horse and Farrier pub, 2008

Gatley's war memorial is situated on Gatley Green, though the original First World War memorial is the clock tower at the junction of Northenden Road and Church Road. Following many years of inoperation, a clock fund was started in 2011 with the intention of repairing and restoring the clock tower and clock. Restoration work was carried out in 2012. The clock tower now boasts a fully working clock; however, its four faces are no longer illuminated at night.

=== Tatton Cinema (frontage) ===
There is also what remains of the Tatton Cinema, which was built in the 1930s. For decades, the cinema was the centrepiece of Gatley and was once one of the most profitable cinemas in the region, but closed in early 2001 due to the increase in multiplex cinemas, particularly the nearby Parrs Wood complex which lies 2 miles (3.2 km) away.

The Cinema opened in 1937 with just one screen; in the 1960s, a second, smaller screen was added, known as Tatton Minor in cinema listings, with the main auditorium known as Tatton Major; by the 1970s, it had been converted into a three screen cinema. In 2005, the auditoriums (situated at the rear of the building) were demolished leaving only the front facade and foyer area still standing. Plans to turn the old cinema into a supermarket were delayed due to the Great Recession. By 2010, two planning applications had been placed to build sheltered housing on the vacant land where the auditoriums were and to create a supermarket at the front. The first supermarket plan envisaged the demolition of half of the facade and the building of a modern edifice to the same scale. The second supermarket plan envisaged the conversion of the same half of the facade. Both planning applications met with opposition (from established local retailers and councillors) and were rejected. In 2015, after years of inaction at the now derelict site, Stockport Council announced plans to acquire the site from its present owners by means of a compulsory purchase order. In August 2015, the current owners, Dickens Property Group, then submitted a new planning application for a supermarket and residential buildings at the site, similar to the plans previously submitted but this time maintaining all of the art deco front facade while demolishing the adjoining buildings and constructing new ones in their place. The plans were accepted by the council, though in October 2015, the council also agreed upon issuing a compulsory purchase order should the planned development not proceed. Work finally began in 2018 and, almost 20 years after the Tatton Cinema closed, a new Co-op supermarket finally opened on the site in November 2020.

=== Gatley Recreation Ground ===
Gatley Park lies between Church Road and Northenden Road. It has a bowling green, a hard-surface tennis and basketball court, a children's playground area and a purpose-built skateboarding area with several ramps. Maintenance of the park is the responsibility of Stockport Council and a local community group called SPRING (Supporters of Parks and Recreation In Gatley) support the council by fundraising, enabling continued investment in park facilities.

=== Walter Stansby Memorial Park ===
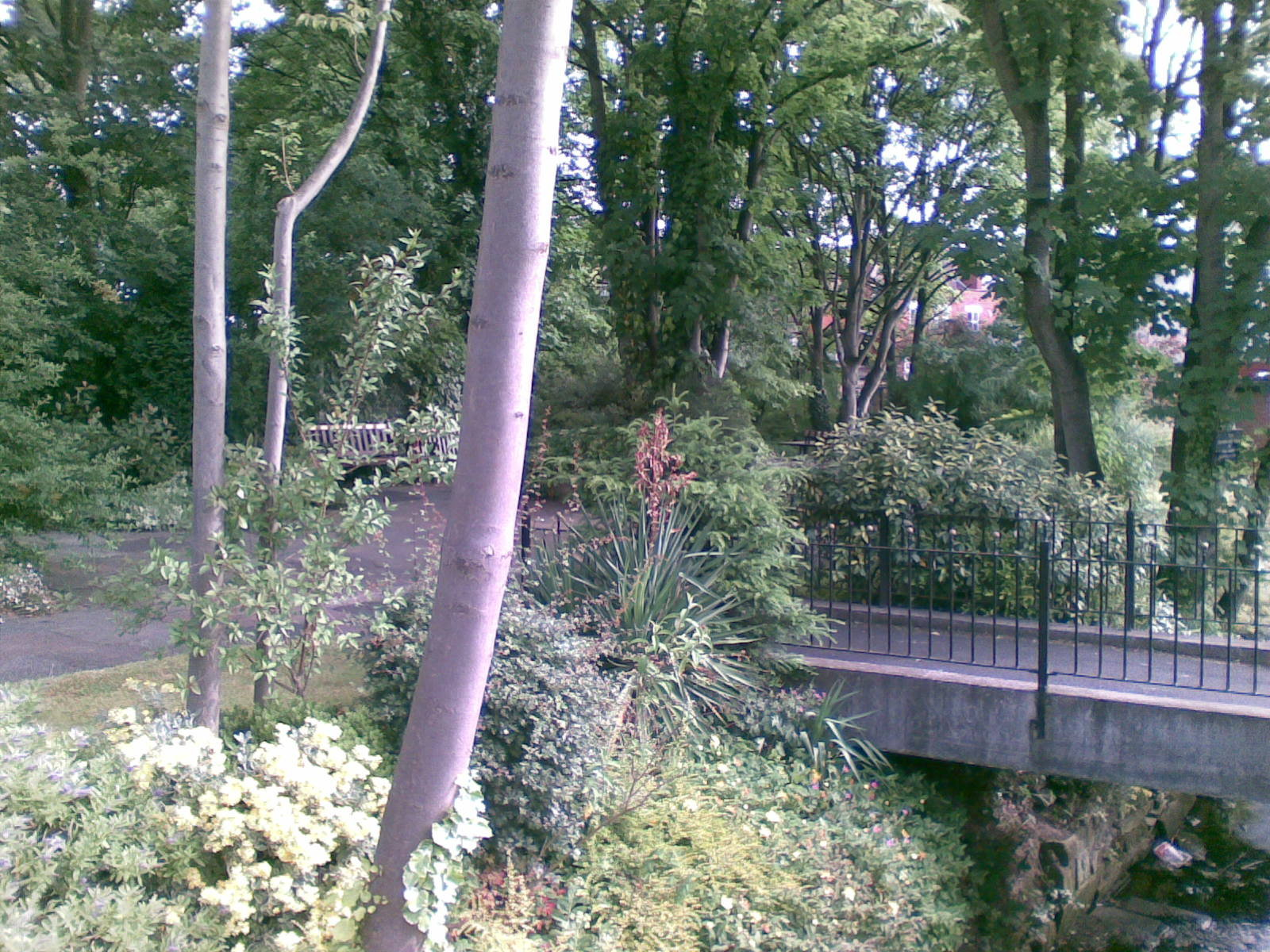
Walter Stansby Memorial Park and Gatley Brook, 2008

Walter Stansby Memorial Park is a small tree-lined park area running between Church Road and Northenden Road, near to the Recreation Ground; the two are separated by a children's day nursery. In contrast to the Recreation Ground, it has been designed to be a tranquil nature spot with tended lawns and plants, several memorial benches, and a path that extends through the park.

=== Scholes Park ===
At the south-western end of the village, close to the boundary of Manchester, is Gatley Hill House, next to which is the William Scholes Park which includes several large playing fields partitioned by small woodland areas. Far larger than Gatley Recreation Ground, this was developed in the early 1960s with money from the William Scholes Foundation. Scholes was a Gatley resident and estate agent who died in 1927. The track circuit opened on 19 May 1962 and was the first home of Cheadle and Gatley Athletics Club, before it merged with Stretford Athletics Club in 1966. Currently, the fields are used for many Gatley events – from the annual Gatley Festival to Sport Relief – and are used regularly by local running clubs, as well as local teams for cricket in the summer and football in the winter. A children's playground was opened in February 2011 at the Foxland Road corner.

=== Gatley Carrs Nature Reserve ===
Gatley Carrs is a local nature reserve at the north-west corner of the area (bounded to the north and west by the M56 motorway and the Stockport-Altrincham railway line). A local community group, the Gatley Carrs Conservation Group, help to maintain the reserve in conjunction with the local authority.

== Culture ==
=== Gatley Festival ===
This annual summer event held on the first Sunday in July. The celebration of village life includes a carnival parade and a family fun day.

The festival is believed to have started in the early 1930s, as the Gatley Rose Queen Parade. The current festival format of a large parade and then a funfair and stalls was started around 1986 and was originally held in what is now known as Gatley Recreation Ground before moving to the much larger Scholes Park next to Gatley Hill House. The festival still maintains the tradition of crowning a rose queen.

=== Gatley Music Festival ===
This non-profit annual event brings live music to the village of Gatley, while at the same time raising money for local charities. It runs in March for one week each year with something for every age and taste, including classical, jazz, brass and choral as well as local indie, acoustic and rock. It has its roots in Music at St James, set up in 1989 by the Rev. Brian Lee (curate of St James in Gatley) and Len Mather. The success of those concerts inspired the establishment of a festival of music in 2005.

== Notable people ==
- Judith Chalmers (1935–2026), television and radio presenter, was born in Gatley
- Bryan Clarke (1932–2014), professor of genetics, latterly emeritus at the University of Nottingham, was born in Gatley
- Cole Palmer (born 2002), professional footballer, attended Gatley Primary School.
- Adam Gillen (born 1985), actor, best known for his role as Liam Conroy in the ITV sitcom Benidorm, grew up in Gatley.

== See also ==
- Listed buildings in Cheadle and Gatley
