= Handforth Town Council =

Local government council in Cheshire, England

Type
- Type: Parish council

Leadership
- Chair: Susan Moore
- Vice Chair: Cynthia Samson
- Parish Clerk: Ashley Comiskey Dawson

Structure
- Seats: 11 councillors
- Independent: 11 / 11

Elections
- Voting system: Multiple non-transferable vote
- Last election: 4 May 2023
- Next election: 4 May 2027

Meeting place
- Handforth Town Council, The Youth Centre, Old Road, Handforth, SK9 3AB

Website
- handforthtowncouncil.gov.uk

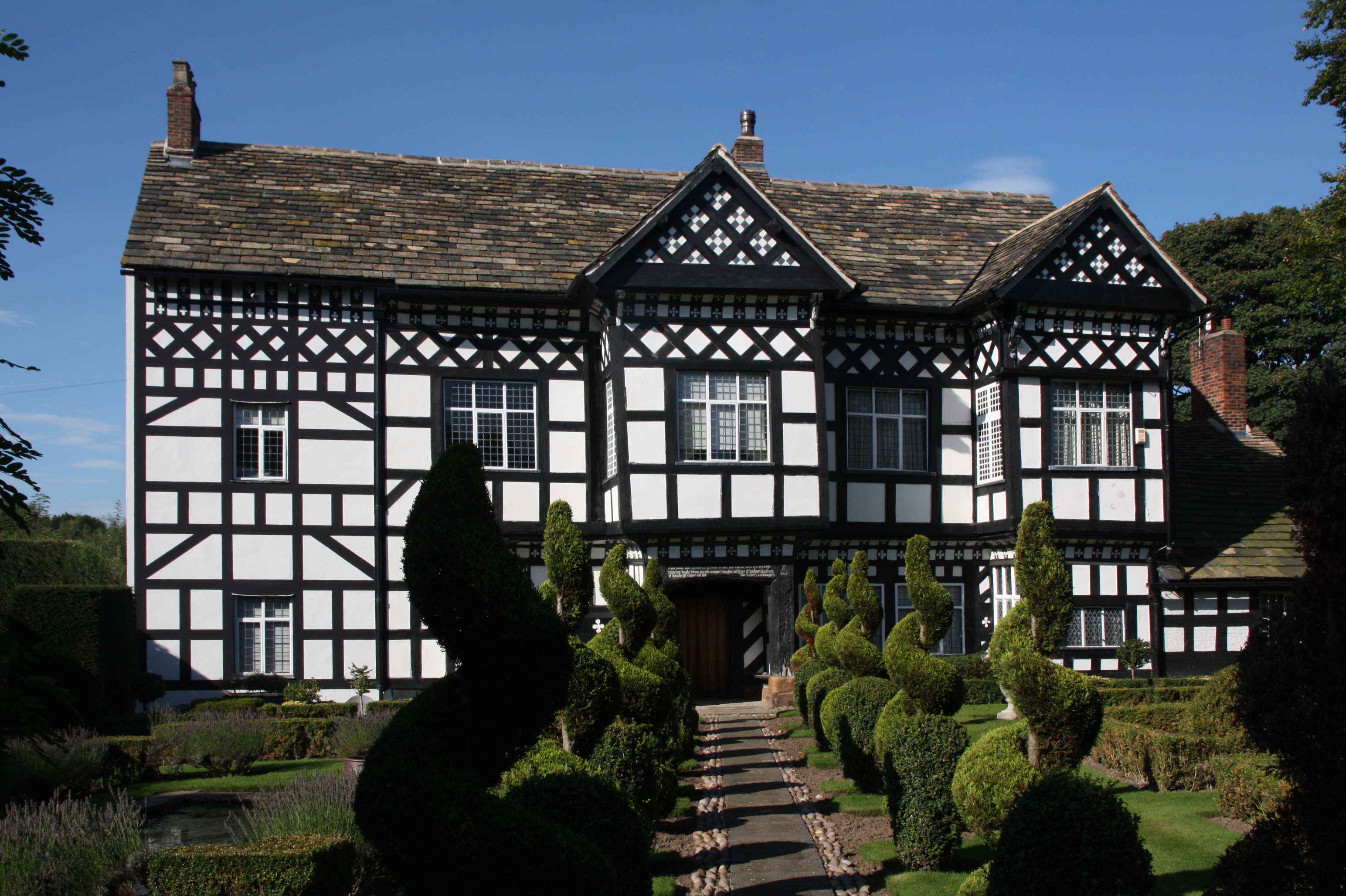
Handforth Hall

Handforth Town Council is the civil parish council of Handforth, Cheshire, England. It was established in the 1890s, abolished in 1936, and re-established in 2011.

Handforth Parish Council received international attention in February 2021 after video of a council meeting on Zoom went viral. In the meeting, town clerk Jackie Weaver removes the council chairman, Brian Tolver, from the meeting for disruptive behaviour. The remaining council members begin arguing about Weaver's level of authority, which turns into them yelling, cursing, and hurling insults at each other.

== Early history (1890s–1936) ==
Following the Local Government Act 1894, a council was established for the rural Handforth parish. It was part of the Stockport Rural District and in 1901 had a population of 794. In 1904, the rural district was abolished. Handforth civil parish became an urban district and the parish council became Handforth Urban District Council, absorbing powers that were previously the responsibility of Stockport Rural District Council. In 1936, the council and urban district were abolished as part of a Local Government Act 1929 county review order and the former area was split between Cheadle and Gatley and Wilmslow.

== Re-established (2011–) ==
The parish council was established again in May 2011 with the new civil parish formed from part of Wilmslow. Its duties and role are to represent the local community, consult and advise on planning applications and provide local amenities and activities such as Christmas lighting and grounds maintenance. Its early projects, such as the development of green belt land, the building of a war memorial, the creation of an after-school club, the creation of the parish council's Facebook page and installation of CCTV cameras were blocked by members of the council, mostly the Handforth Ratepayers. Accusations of personal conflicts of interest were made by the Ratepayers and their rivals on the council, Improving Handforth, and relations between the two became increasingly fractious. Formal complaints were made by both groups, including by Aled Brewerton (who was then a member of the public). Lawyers' statements were read out at meetings on a regular basis.

In 2017, residents complained about the conduct of parish councillors as they believed meetings were becoming unproductive. The Independent described Handforth council meetings as "full of petty arguments about points of order and whether items had been agreed for the agenda – with the battle of ideas entirely absent." A letter from David Brown, director of governance and compliance at Cheshire East Council, made references to councillors' behaviour in the past and alleged misconduct, including suggestions by unnamed councillors that elections should not be held:

As Monitoring Officer in Cheshire East I have received a multiplicity of complaints and referrals. These range from multiple complaints about councillors' behaviour; to fundamental issues of governance and member/officer engagement. The most recent referrals relate to suggestions that some members of Handforth Parish Council have purported to take decisions that are plainly unlawful, and these decisions have resulted in expenditure of public funds.

— David Brown, Director of Governance and Compliance at Cheshire East Council

At an employment committee meeting held on 4 November 2020, three councillors – Brian Tolver, Aled Brewerton and Barry Burkhill – suspended the clerk Ashley Comiskey Dawson.

=== Jackie Weaver ===
Extraordinary meeting of Handforth Parish Council Planning and Environment Committee
- Date: 10 December 2020
- Time: 19:00 – 19:35 (GMT)
- Venue: Online via Zoom
- Participants: Brian Tolver (Council Chair); Susan Moore (Committee Vice-Chair); Aled Brewerton; Barry Burkhill; Cynthia Samson; John Smith; Jackie Weaver (Clerk to the meeting); Seven members of the public
- Outcome: Tolver, Brewerton, Burkhill removed from meeting by Weaver
- Website: Minutes of the meeting

==== Zoom meeting ====
In a Zoom meeting of the Handforth Parish Council Planning and Environment Committee on 10 December 2020, two camps formed over a bureaucratic dispute. Jackie Weaver, chief officer of the Cheshire Association of Local Councils (ChALC), was brought into the meeting to moderate and provide guidance on the running of the council.

She is recorded as clerk to the meeting in the official minutes, but is not the official clerk of Handforth Parish Council. For this reason, council chairman Brian Tolver refused to accept the legality or legitimacy of the meeting, called by two other councillors, as no proper officer was present, saying that she had "no authority here", sentiments echoed by vice chair Aled Brewerton. (Weaver said there was no need for a proper officer to be involved while she was acting as clerk.) This led to Tolver being moved from the meeting into a virtual waiting room. In response to Weaver initiating a vote for a proxy chair in Tolver's absence, Brewerton angrily insisted that he should assume control as vice chair. Brewerton was consequently removed from the conference by Weaver, along with councillor Barry Burkhill, who had protested the expulsion of Tolver and Brewerton. Councillor John Smith was nominated as proxy chair, and allowed a vote to confirm the removals.

==== Legacy ====
On the evening of 4 February 2021, the video of the December meeting went viral, after being found by Shaan Ali, a 17-year-old local government enthusiast and politics A-Level student from East London. He noted "it's the parish councils who directly work with communities and it's so fascinating because [they argue] over the smallest issues". He found the video on YouTube and told a friend who tweeted it. This was then retweeted by thousands, including Piers Morgan, Richard Osman and Greg James, leading to increased attention. Weaver's name was the highest trending topic on Twitter in the United Kingdom that night and the following day. The clip drew attention because most parish council meetings have a reputation for being sedate and well-mannered. The event spawned memes, merchandise, and international media coverage. It was described as "like an absurdist British play" by The Washington Post, who noted that Weaver "was hailed for her fortitude and stoicism — two revered British traits".

On 5 February, Weaver appeared on Woman's Hour on BBC Radio 4, followed by an appearance on The Last Leg. Among the various tributes that have been paid to Weaver is a song titled "An Ode to Jackie Weaver", with music composed by Andrew Lloyd Webber and lyrics penned by Don Black. In the song, Weaver is affectionately hailed as "Britain’s answer to the American dream" and "the role model we all strive to be. She doesn't want a medal, just a nice cup of tea". On 10 February, Lloyd Webber appeared on Good Morning Britain to explain his composition; Carrie Hope Fletcher sang the new lyrics, with Lloyd Webber accompanying her at the piano.

==== Reaction ====
Weaver said of the incident that she has had "nothing but positive support" for her behaviour and actions in the Zoom call, adding: "There is an element of bullying and bad behaviour in local councils, and a lot of us are working very hard, and that includes central government, to try to do something about that. Because we're passionate about the fact that local government is the mechanism by which people can really engage with their communities." Weaver has also said that the aggressive and bullying attitudes of the councillors had "gone on in Handforth for some period of time", adding that she believed sexism played a part of the reason as to why Tolver and others acted in such an aggressive and confrontational manner, saying "maybe an underlying part of it was they just didn't like being told no by a woman". During the meeting, councillor John Smith described the events as "a very good example of bullying within Cheshire East and the environs".

Tolver maintained that he was in the right, calling Weaver "an unqualified member of the public" and adding: "Removing half the councillors from the meeting denied half of the voters of the village from being represented – it was an appalling attack on their democratic rights." He has also called the clips being shared on YouTube and social media "corrupt copies" and "hooky videos".

Robert Jenrick, the communities and local government secretary, had been considering legislation which would make parish council Zoom meetings permanent as a result of the viral meeting which has increased interest in the meetings.

==== Vote of no confidence ====
Following the viral video, councillors received an unprecedented number of complaints from parishioners arguing the council was not fit for purpose. In February 2021, Burkhill faced a vote of no confidence from Conservative councillor Liz Wardlaw on Cheshire East Council for his "complicity in the bullying" of Weaver and for bringing "this council and his role within this council into disrepute".

The mayor's participation in that meeting has led us to believe he has brought this council and his role within this council into disrepute. He made no attempt to intervene as it became clear participants in that meeting were being bullied. The inaction of the mayor could be seen as a demonstration of his complicity in the bullying that occurred and this cannot be ignored. In light of the above [we propose] this council resolves it has no confidence in the mayor and his term of office as mayor and chairman of the council will cease immediately.

The motion was referred to the council’s standards committee but was not debated at the full council meeting.

==== Aftermath ====
The February meeting on Zoom had over 1,000 people watching the live stream and large numbers watched the March and April live stream. In the April live stream, the chair of Handforth Parish Council, Brian Tolver, resigned (as chair, but not from his position as councillor) during the meeting. Vice-chair Aled Brewerton also announced he would be stepping down from vice-chair and the parish council. Their resignations were believed to have been in response to the reaction of the meeting. Burkhill served out his term of office as mayor, staying in post until May 2021 being replaced by Sarah Pochin and then continued as a councillor, but he quit the parish council the same month saying, "I have decided to concentrate on my Handforth Ratepayer Independent role at CEC, as too much of my time has been taken up in trying to deal with HPC's enduring problems."

As parish councils are permitted to be known as town councils, village councils, community councils or neighbourhood councils and require only a resolution of the parish council to change their name, Handforth Parish Council decided at a meeting on 13 July that from 31 July it would be known as Handforth Town Council.

In August 2021, Weaver was the celebrity invited to open the annual Ambridge village fete in BBC Radio 4's long-running soap opera The Archers. The following February she was a contestant on BBC's Celebrity Mastermind, with a specialist subject of The Chronicles of Riddick, and a chosen charity of Cheshire Community Action. She scored 15 points and finished in second place. Her appearance was met with some media comment. In February 2025, she was invited by the BBC to comment as an expert on local councillor misbehaviour about an ongoing conflict at Teignbridge District Council in Devon.

In March 2022, a series of six reports commissioned by Cheshire East Council into the conduct of councillors of the then Handforth Parish Council was published. One concluded that during the 10 December 2020 meeting, Weaver did not "have the authority" to mute councillors and move them into the virtual waiting room, but that "Faced with what were unusual and difficult circumstances, and the deep-seated issues underpinning those circumstances, we can understand why Jackie Weaver acted as she did, despite her action being without any formal footing in terms of appropriate process and procedure". The six reports cost a total of £85,000.

Tolver died in July 2022. Burkhill died from melanoma on 19 November 2022 at the age of 83.

== Councillors ==
Elections were held in 2023 when the following councillors were elected. The chair as of 25 July 2024 is Susan Moore and the vice chair is Cynthia Samson.

=== East Ward ===
This ward was not contested.

- Cynthia Samson – Independent
- John Smith – Independent
- Kerry Sullivan – Independent
- Elizabeth Hindle-Newman – Independent

=== South Ward ===
- Tim Royle – Independent
- Roger Small – Independent
- Peter Moore – Independent

=== West Ward ===
This ward was not contested.

- Susan Moore – Independent
- Julie Smith – Independent
- Tim Hardon – Independent
- Sharon Murray – Independent

== Elections ==
=== 2023 elections ===
==== East Ward ====
This ward was uncontested.

2023 Handforth Parish Council elections: Handforth East Ward (4 seats)
Party	Candidate	Votes	%	±%
Independent	Cynthia Margaret Samson	Unopposed	N/A	N/A
Independent	Elizabeth Hindle-Newman	Unopposed	N/A	N/A
Independent	John Michael Smith	Unopposed	N/A	N/A
Independent	Kerry Sullivan	Unopposed	N/A	N/A
Turnout		N/A	N/A	N/A
Independent gain from Improving Handforth		Swing	N/A	
Independent gain from Improving Handforth		Swing	N/A	
Independent gain from Improving Handforth		Swing	N/A	

==== South Ward ====
2023 Handforth Parish Council elections: Handforth South Ward (3 seats)
Party	Candidate	Votes	%	±%
Independent	Peter Moore	286		
Labour	Ribia Nisa	200		
Independent	Tim Royle	383		
Independent	Roger Clive Small	345		
Turnout		N/A	40.35	–2.30
Independent gain from Handforth Ratepayers' Association				
Independent gain from Handforth Ratepayers' Association				
Independent gain from Handforth Ratepayers' Association				

There were 7 rejected ballots in the South Ward.

==== West Ward ====
This ward was uncontested.

2023 Handforth Parish Council elections: Handforth West Ward (4 seats)
Party	Candidate	Votes	%	±%
Independent	Susan Elizabeth Moore	N/A	N/A	N/A
Independent	Julie Smith	N/A	N/A	N/A
Independent	Tim Hardy	N/A	N/A	N/A
Independent	Sharon Murray	N/A	N/A	N/A
Turnout		N/A	N/A	N/A
Independent gain from Independent and Protect Greenbelt				
Independent gain from Independent				
Independent gain from Improving Handforth				

=== 2019 elections ===
==== East Ward ====
Incumbent Councillors Cynthia Samson and John Smith were returned, uncontested. Both had been elected in 2015 under the "Improving Handforth" banner and were returned uncontested under the same banner.

2019 Handforth Parish Council elections: Handforth East Ward (2 seats)
Party	Candidate	Votes	%	±%
Improving Handforth	Cynthia Margaret Samson	Unopposed	N/A	N/A
Improving Handforth	John Michael Smith	Unopposed	N/A	N/A
Majority		Unopposed	N/A	N/A
Majority		Unopposed	N/A	N/A
Turnout		N/A	N/A	N/A
Improving Handforth hold		Swing	N/A	
Improving Handforth hold		Swing	N/A	

==== South Ward ====
Incumbent Councillor Brian Tolver was re-elected, with a reduced majority. He had previously been elected in 2015 as an independent, but stood in 2019 under the banner of "Handforth Ratepayers' Association". He was joined by long-serving Cheshire East Council member Barry Burkhill, who has represented Handforth on Cheshire East Council and its predecessor Macclesfield Borough Council since 1979. Burkhill joined Tolver in standing as a member of the "Handforth Ratepayers' Association". He replaced incumbent Councillor Ian Clark, who did not re-contest the seat.

2019 Handforth Parish Council elections: Handforth South Ward (2 seats)
Party	Candidate	Votes	%	±%
Handforth Ratepayers' Association	Barry Edward Burkhill	316	29.98	+29.98
Handforth Ratepayers' Association	Brian Victor Tolver	271	25.71	−9.71
Independent	Andrew Backhouse	239	22.68	+22.68
Independent	Roger Clive Small	228	21.63	+21.63
Majority		77	7.31	+7.31
Majority		32	3.04	−7.16
Turnout		1,054	42.60	−26.37
Handforth Ratepayers' Association gain from Independent		Swing		
Handforth Ratepayers' Association hold		Swing		

There were 5 spoilt ballots in the South Ward.

==== West Ward ====
All three Councillors for the heavily-contested West Ward were elected for the first time. The three incumbent Councillors returned in 2015, Kerry Burgess ("Independent and Protect Greenbelt"), Matthew Clark (Independent) and Kerry Sullivan (an ally of Councillors Samson and Smith in the East Ward, under the "Improving Handforth" banner) all declined to re-contest their seats. The three successfully-returned Councillors in 2019, Aled Brewerton, Susan Moore and Jean Thompson, were all elected as independents. However, after the election, both Aled Brewerton and Jean Thompson would side with the two "Handforth Ratepayers' Association" Councillors in South Ward, while Susan Moore would side with the two Independent Councillors in East Ward who had originally been elected under the "Improving Handforth" banner. Councillor Thompson was then unseated in 2020, due to a failure to attend any council meetings for six months.

2019 Handforth Parish Council elections: Handforth West Ward (3 seats)
Party	Candidate	Votes	%	±%
Independent	Susan Elizabeth Moore	451	21.17	+21.17
Independent	Jean Thompson	369	17.32	+17.32
Independent	Aled Brewerton	353	16.57	+16.57
Independent	Michael Keith Thompson	294	13.80	+13.80
Independent	Lee Robert Nelson	263	12.35	+12.35
Independent	Timothy Hardy	218	10.23	+10.23
Liberal Democrats	Chris Fortune	182	8.55	+8.55
Majority		157	7.20	+7.20
Majority		75	3.44	+3.44
Majority		59	2.71	+2.71
Turnout		2,180	23.92	+23.92
Independent gain from Independent and Protect Greenbelt		Swing		
Independent gain from Independent		Swing		
Independent gain from Improving Handforth		Swing		

There were 20 spoilt ballots in the West Ward.

=== 2015 elections ===
==== East Ward ====
2015 Handforth Parish Council elections: Handforth East Ward (2 seats)
Party	Candidate	Votes	%	±%
Improving Handforth	Cynthia Margaret Samson	534	43.31	
Improving Handforth	John Michael Smith	473	38.36	
Independent	Beryl May Chapman	226	18.33	
Majority		308	24.98	
Majority		247	20.03	
Turnout		1,233	53.93	
Improving Handforth gain from Independent				
Improving Handforth gain from Independent				

There were 44 spoilt ballots in the East Ward.

==== South Ward ====
2015 Handforth Parish Council elections: Handforth South Ward (2 seats)
Party	Candidate	Votes	%	±%
Independent	Ian Clark	540	39.36	
Independent	Brian Victor Tolver	486	35.42	
Improving Handforth	Victor Moran	346	25.22	
Majority		194	14.14	
Majority		140	10.20	
Turnout		1,372	68.97	
Independent hold		Swing		
Independent hold		Swing		

There were 37 spoilt ballots in the South Ward.

==== West Ward ====
2015 Handforth Parish Council elections: Handforth West Ward (3 seats)
Party	Candidate	Votes	%	±%
Independent and Protect Greenbelt	Kerry Burgess	Unopposed	N/A	N/A
Independent	Matthew Clark	Unopposed	N/A	N/A
Improving Handforth	Kerry Sullivan	Unopposed	N/A	N/A
Majority		Unopposed	N/A	N/A
Majority		Unopposed	N/A	N/A
Majority		Unopposed	N/A	N/A
Turnout		N/A	N/A	N/A
Independent and Protect Greenbelt gain from Independent		Swing		
Independent hold		Swing	N/A	
Improving Handforth gain from Independent		Swing		
