= Cheadle Moseley =

Coordinates: 53.3798°N 2.1916°W

- Location within Greater Manchester
- Metropolitan borough: Stockport
- Metropolitan county: Greater Manchester
- Region: North West
- Country: England
- Sovereign state: United Kingdom
- Police: Greater Manchester
- Fire: Greater Manchester
- Ambulance: North West

Cheadle Moseley was a township in the ancient parish of Cheadle and later a separate civil parish, now in Greater Manchester, England. It lay in the historic county of Cheshire. In 1851 it had a population of 2319.

== Geography ==
Cheadle Moseley covered much of the rural area that formed modern-day Cheadle and Cheadle Hulme.

The 1846 tithe map shows that Cheadle Moseley was intertwined with Cheadle Bulkeley township, an unusual situation in Cheshire. The 1870s Ordnance Survey map shows that the townships each had many detached portions, several enclosed within the other. (Cheadle Moseley had 8 detached portions, and Cheadle Bulkeley had 35 detached portions.)

Together, the two townships were bordered to the west by Stockport Etchells, to the north by Heaton Norris, to the east by Bramhall and Stockport and to the south by Handforth.

== History ==
Cheadle Moseley existed as a township from the Middle Ages, in 1866 Cheadle Moseley became a separate civil parish, on 29 September 1879 it was merged with Cheadle Bulkeley to form Cheadle civil parish.

In 1894, Cheadle and Stockport Etchells civil parishes merged to form the parish and Urban District of Cheadle and Gatley, finally becoming part of the Metropolitan Borough of Stockport in 1974.
