= A555 road =

Road in England

A555

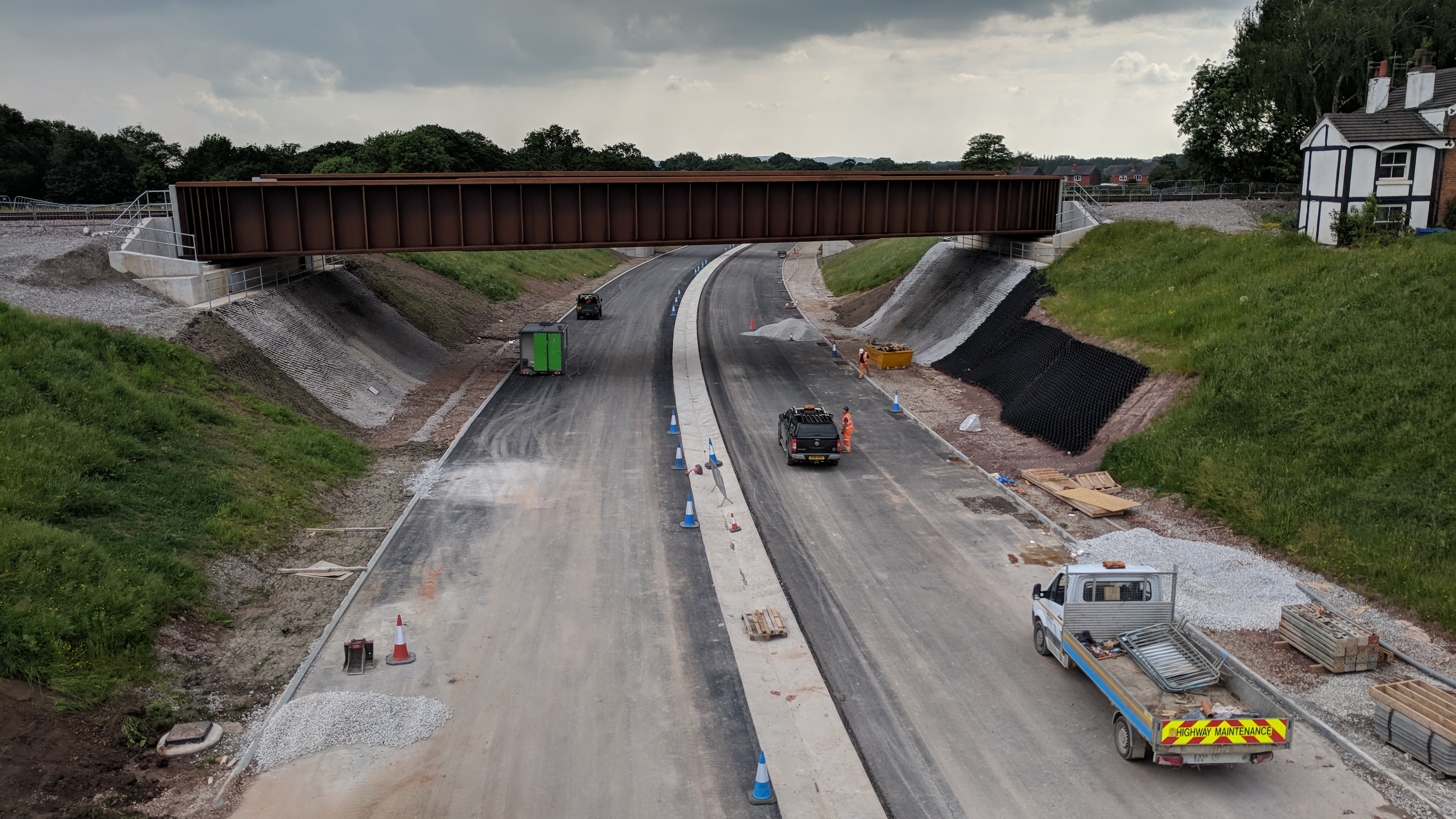
- The A555 under construction, viewed from an old section of the A6 Buxton Road, looking west

Route information
- Maintained by Cheshire East Council
- Length: 8.1 mi (13.0 km)

Major junctions
- West end: Manchester Airport
- A34 A5102 A523; A6
- East end: Hazel Grove

Location
- Country: United Kingdom
- Counties: Cheshire, Greater Manchester

Road network
- Roads in the United Kingdom; Motorways; A and B road zones
← A554	→ A556

The A555 road is in Greater Manchester, England, along its southern border with Cheshire. It is officially known as the Manchester Airport Eastern Link and runs between Manchester Airport and the A6 south of Hazel Grove in the borough of Stockport.

== History ==
The earliest section of the A555 was completed in 1995, as part of an abandoned scheme to connect Stockport, Hazel Grove and Poynton to Manchester Airport. It was intended as a relief road to ease congestion. The original plan, which dated from the 1940s, was to build a bypass connecting Bredbury and Hazel Grove, and from Hazel Grove to Woodford, bypassing Poynton. The road would then run from Woodford to Handforth, as it does now, and then on to the airport. However, only the middle section, which crosses the A34 Handforth bypass (built at the same time) was completed, because of a shortage of funds.

== Central section ==
Until 2018, the route ran from the border of Woodford and Bramhall at a junction with the A5102, heading westward for approximately 2 miles (3.2 km) before it reaches the A34 Handforth bypass, which is accessed by a grade-separated junction. Close to this is Handforth Dean retail outlet, consisting of Tesco Extra and Marks & Spencer. The route ended at a double-headed roundabout with the B5358, on the border of Handforth and Heald Green, approximately 3 miles (4.8 km) from the airport.

== Expansion ==
In November 2008, money was pledged by the then Transport Secretary Geoff Hoon to extend the route to Hazel Grove, and complete the link to the airport. However, following the change in government at the 2010 general election, the plans were placed on hold once more.

In November 2011, the government finally approved plans to complete the link, as part of a major programme of infrastructure investment. The A6 to Manchester Airport Relief Road, which completes the route between Hazel Grove and the airport using the A555, gained its final approval in March 2015 and was scheduled for completion and opening in spring 2018.

Persistent heavy rain from December 2017 to February 2018 and the collapse of construction firm Carillion delayed the opening date until later in the year. An activity day including a 5 km (3.1 mi) fun run took place on 7 October 2018 as a precursor to full opening and the bypass opened for general use on 15 October 2018, at 06:00. This section has been subject to persistent flooding and subsequent closures.
