= Meriton (disambiguation) =

Meriton is an Australian construction company and property developer.

Meriton may also refer to:

- Meriton (surname)
- Meriton Grand Hotel Tallinn, a hotel in Tallinn, Estonia
- Meriton Road Park, a park in Handforth, England
