= A555 =

A555 may refer to the following roads:

- A555 road in Greater Manchester, UK
- Bundesautobahn 555, between Cologne and Bonn, Germany
