= Meriton (surname) =

Meriton is a surname. Notable people with the surname include:

- George Meriton (died 1624), English churchman
- Henry Meriton (1762–1826), English sea captain
- Thomas Meriton (born 1638), English dramatist and cleric
- Vincent Meriton (born 1960), Seychellois politician

== See also ==
- Meriton (disambiguation)
