= Urian Brereton =

English Groom of the Privy to King Henry VIII

- Born: Urian Brereton c 1505; Malpas, Cheshire, England
- Died: 19 March 1577 (aged 71–72); Handforth, Cheshire, England
- Resting place: St Mary's Church, Cheadle
- Spouses: Margaret Handford (m. 1530); Alice Trafford (m. 1547)
- Children: 13

Sir Urian Brereton was a Groom of the Privy Chamber to King Henry VIII. Whilst in this role his older brother William Brereton, also a Groom of the Privy Chamber, was executed along with others for high treason and adultery with Anne Boleyn. Many historians are now of the opinion that these executions were politically motivated. Apart from William, Urian had another brother in royal service who was a royal chaplain.

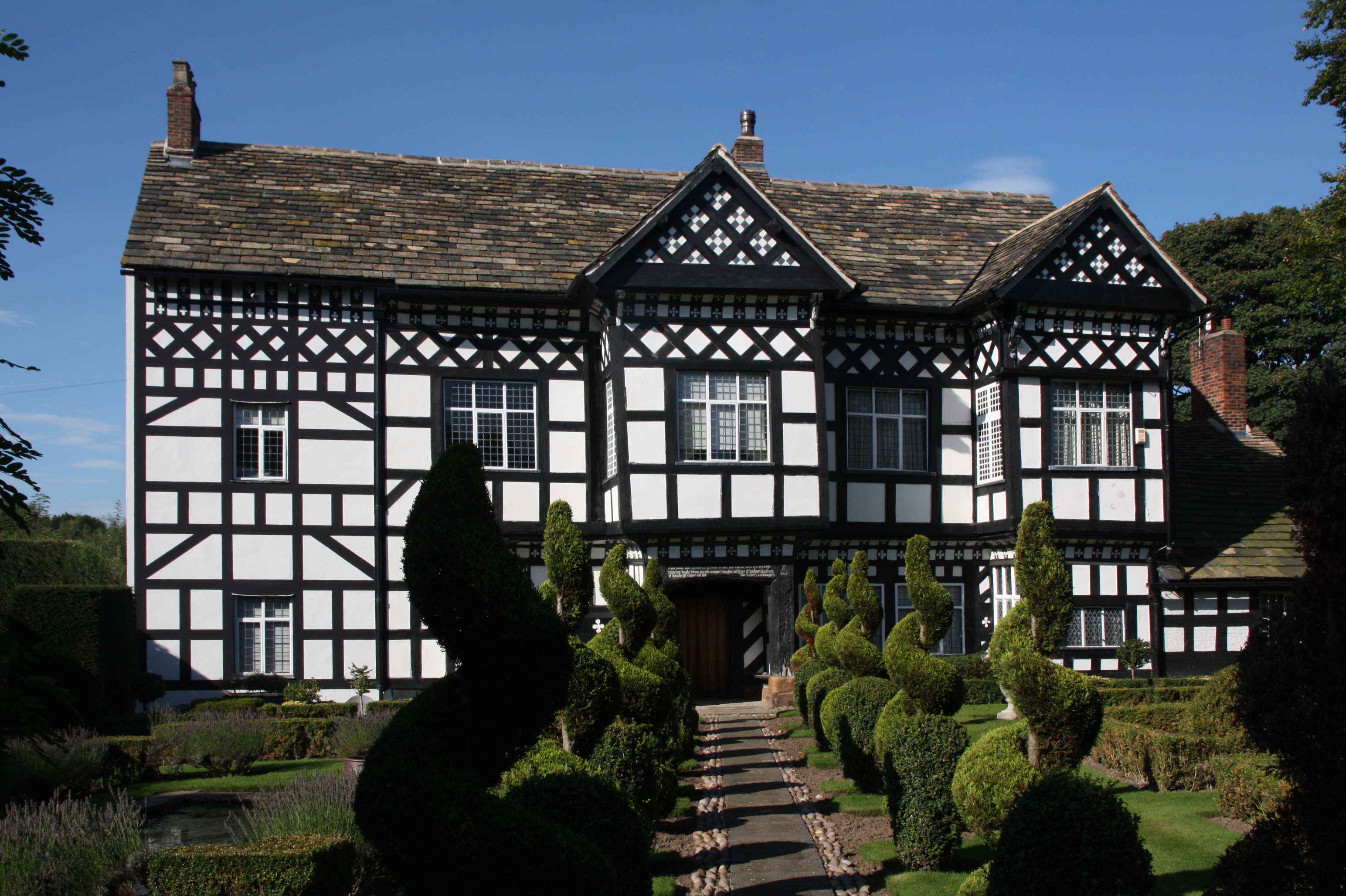
Handforth Hall, built by Urian Brereton, seen in 2013

In 1526 he was appointed Ranger of Delamere Forest and Escheator of Cheshire although in some sources these appointments belonged to his brother William. Some grants like Keeper of Shotwick Park he was given jointly with his brother. Sometime after 1527, Urian married Margaret, daughter and sole heir to William Handford. As Groom of the Privy Chamber, Brereton would have been in the king's company on a daily basis and would have seen Anne Boleyn on a regular basis as well.

Although it is often said that Anne had a greyhound called Urian which was given to her by either William or Urian Brereton, historians now think the story has been misunderstood. Anne did have a greyhound because, in Henry VIII's privy purse expenses, there is a record of a farmer being paid 10 shillings in compensation for a cow which had been killed by two greyhounds who had slipped their leashes during an autumn hunt. One of the dogs belonged to Urian Brereton and the other belonged to Anne.

Despite both the queen's execution and his brother's execution in 1536 he continued to enjoy the king's favour, receiving the bulk of William's Cheshire estates—amounting to over 200 acres—from the king. In 1538 he was appointed Sheriff of Flint, and in July that year he became attorney to the king. Following the Dissolution of the Monasteries, the king granted Brereton the assets of Newnham Priory and Chester Priory.

Brereton was also involved in trying to negotiate the betrothal of Prince Edward to the infant Mary, Queen of Scots as part of the Treaty of Greenwich. Following the breakdown of that agreement, Henry VIII wanted retribution and in May 1544, he sent an army to Scotland which included the Burning of Leith. It was during this time that Brereton was knighted by the Earl of Hertford for valour. In 1550 he became the Escheator of Flint.

Brereton was responsible for the construction of Handforth Hall, where he died on 19 March 1577. He was buried in St Mary's Church, Cheadle, where he financed a screen to be installed round the Brereton chapel.

Brereton was the son of Sir Randle Brereton and Eleanor Dutton, brother of William Brereton, grandfather of Ambrose Barlow, and great-grandfather of Sir William Brereton, 1st Baronet.
