= Handforth Dean =

Retail park in Cheshire, England

Coordinates: 53.34949°N 2.20621°W

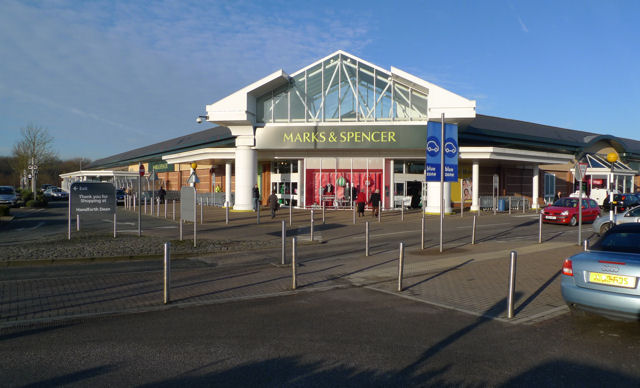
The Marks & Spencer store at Handforth Dean, in December 2009

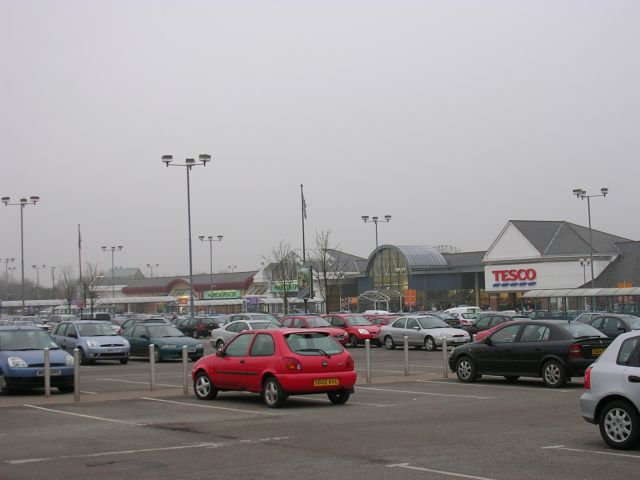
The main car park at Handforth Dean, with Marks & Spencer and Tesco in the background

Handforth Dean is a retail park in Handforth, Cheshire, England; it opened in 1995, alongside the A34. It contains four superstores: Marks & Spencer, Tesco Extra, JD Sports and Boots. Large Next and Pets at Home stores are sited on a development adjacent to the retail park.

In 2002, the Marks & Spencer store was the company's most profitable outside London; it is also one of their largest stores in the country.

In 2007, the Tesco store had a second floor added to handle the number of customers that used it and was converted into a Tesco Extra. Tesco has described Handforth Dean as its "flagship store".
