= Stockport Etchells =

Coordinates: 53.3945°N 2.2469°W

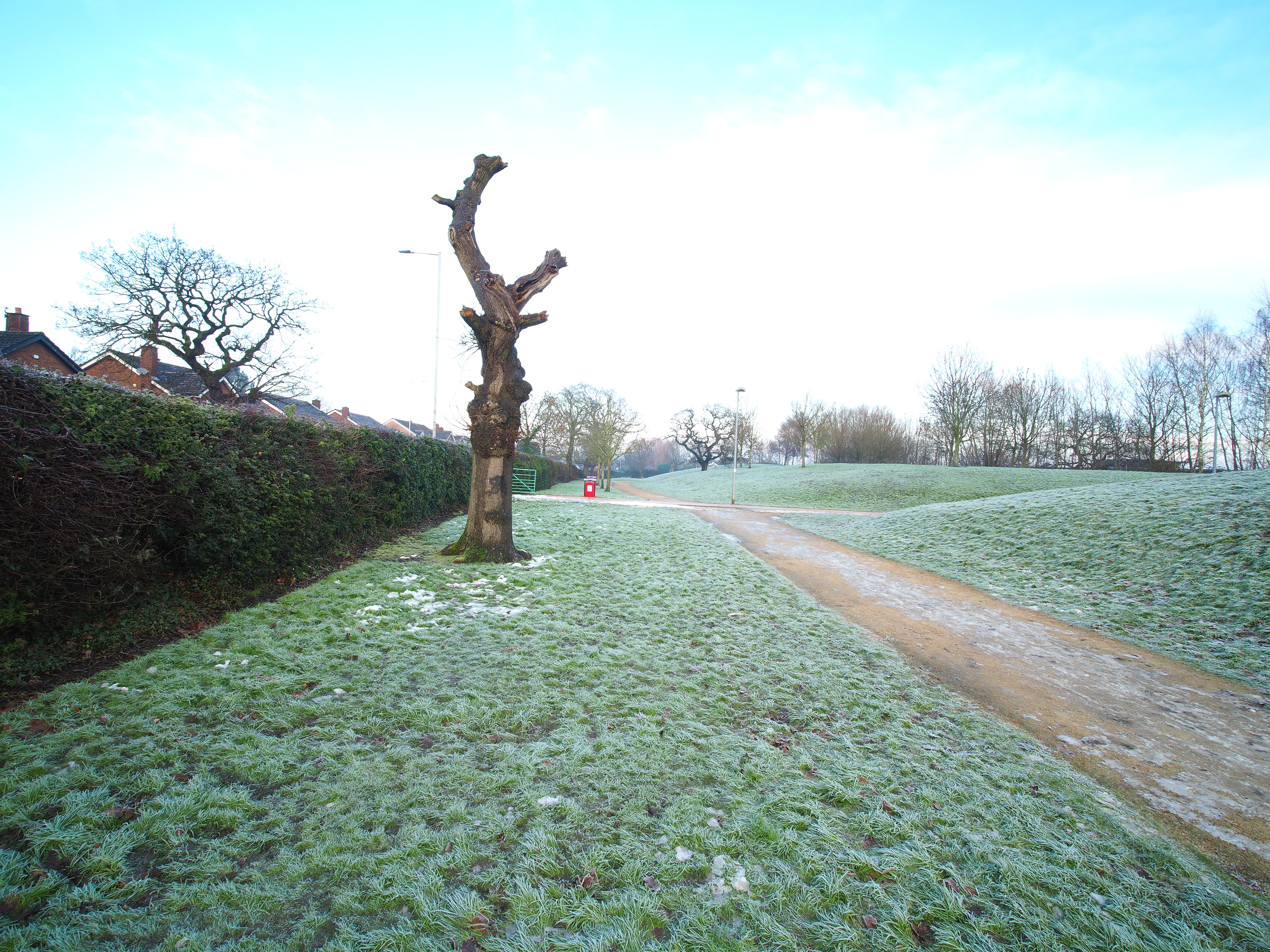
- Dead tree near St Annes Road North in 2021

- Location within Greater Manchester
- Metropolitan borough: Stockport
- Metropolitan county: Greater Manchester
- Region: North West
- Country: England
- Sovereign state: United Kingdom
- Police: Greater Manchester
- Fire: Greater Manchester
- Ambulance: North West

Stockport Etchells was a township and civil parish in Cheshire, England.

== Geography ==
Stockport Etchells covered the rural area that includes modern-day Gatley and Heald Green. Hamlets in Stockport Etchells included Gatley Green, High Grove, Long Lane, Bolshaw and Outwood.

== History ==
Stockport Etchells existed as a township in the parish of Stockport from the Middle Ages. In 1866, Stockport Etchells became a separate civil parish, and in 1910 merged with Cheadle Bulkeley and Cheadle Moseley to form the Cheadle and Gatley Urban District and parish. In 1921, the parish had a population of 2,191.

Stockport Etchells and Northen Etchells were collectively called Etchells and often administered together from the 16th to 18th centuries.
