= Meriton Road Park =

Park in Handforth, England

Coordinates: 53.35°N 2.22°W

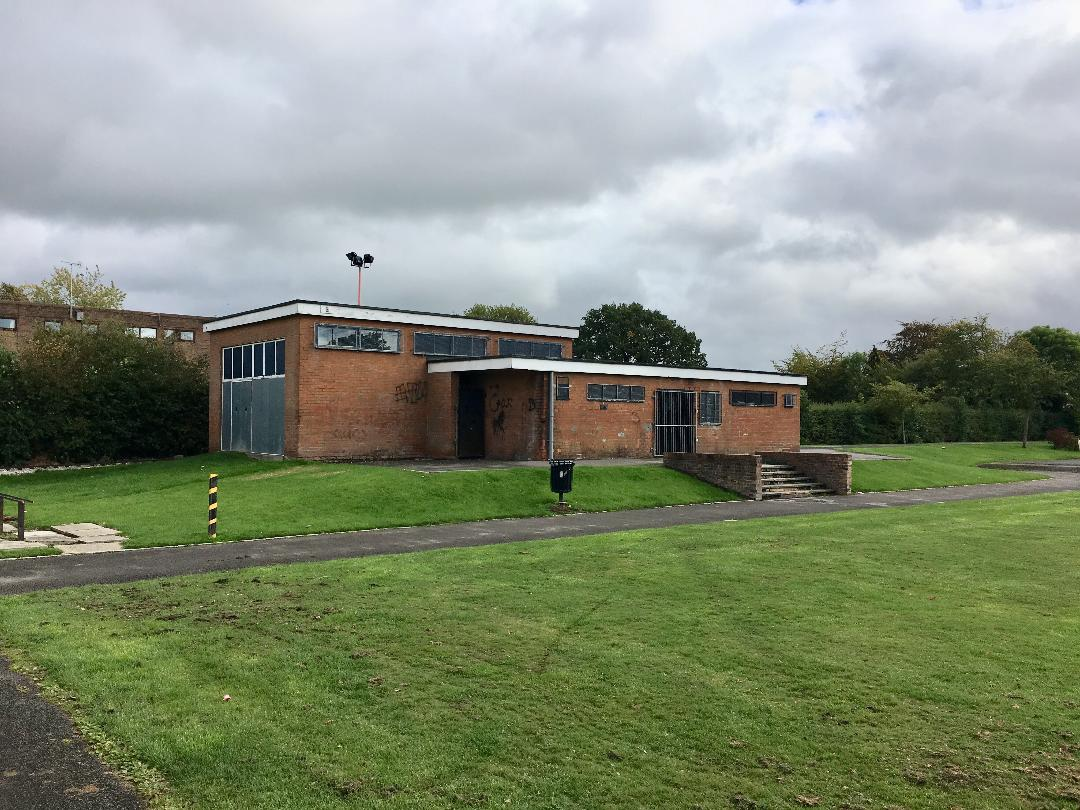
Pavilion at Meriton Park

Meriton Road Park in Handforth, Cheshire, England opened in 1935, covers an area of 3.4 hectares (8.4 acres) and is situated to the rear of the Paddock Shopping Centre. Until the mid-1980s the park was the site for the Handforth Gala. Current attractions in the park include a multi-sport court, tennis courts and a miniature railway which is operated by Handforth Model Engineering Society.
