= Pets at Home =

British pet supply store chain

Pets at Home Group PLC
- Type: Public limited company
- Traded as: LSE: PETS; FTSE 250 component
- Industry: Retail
- Founded: 1991; 35 years ago
- Founder: Anthony Preston
- Headquarters: Handforth, Cheshire, England, United Kingdom
- Area served: United Kingdom
- Key people: Ian Burke (Executive Chairman) James Bailey (Chief Executive Officer)
- Products: Pet supplies
- Revenue: ▼£1,469.6 million (2026)
- Operating income: ▼£109.2 million (2026)
- Net income: ▼£63.1 million (2026)
- Number of employees: 15,300
- Divisions: Vets for Pets; Pets Grooming; Pets Insurance
- Website: www.petsathome.com

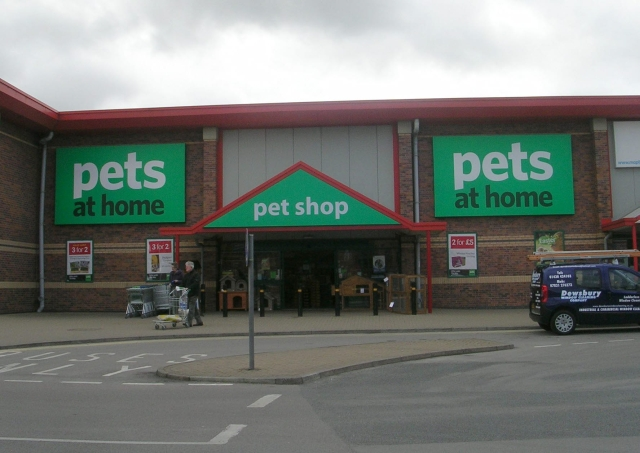
Pets at Home, Westgate Retail Park, Wakefield, West Yorkshire (2009)

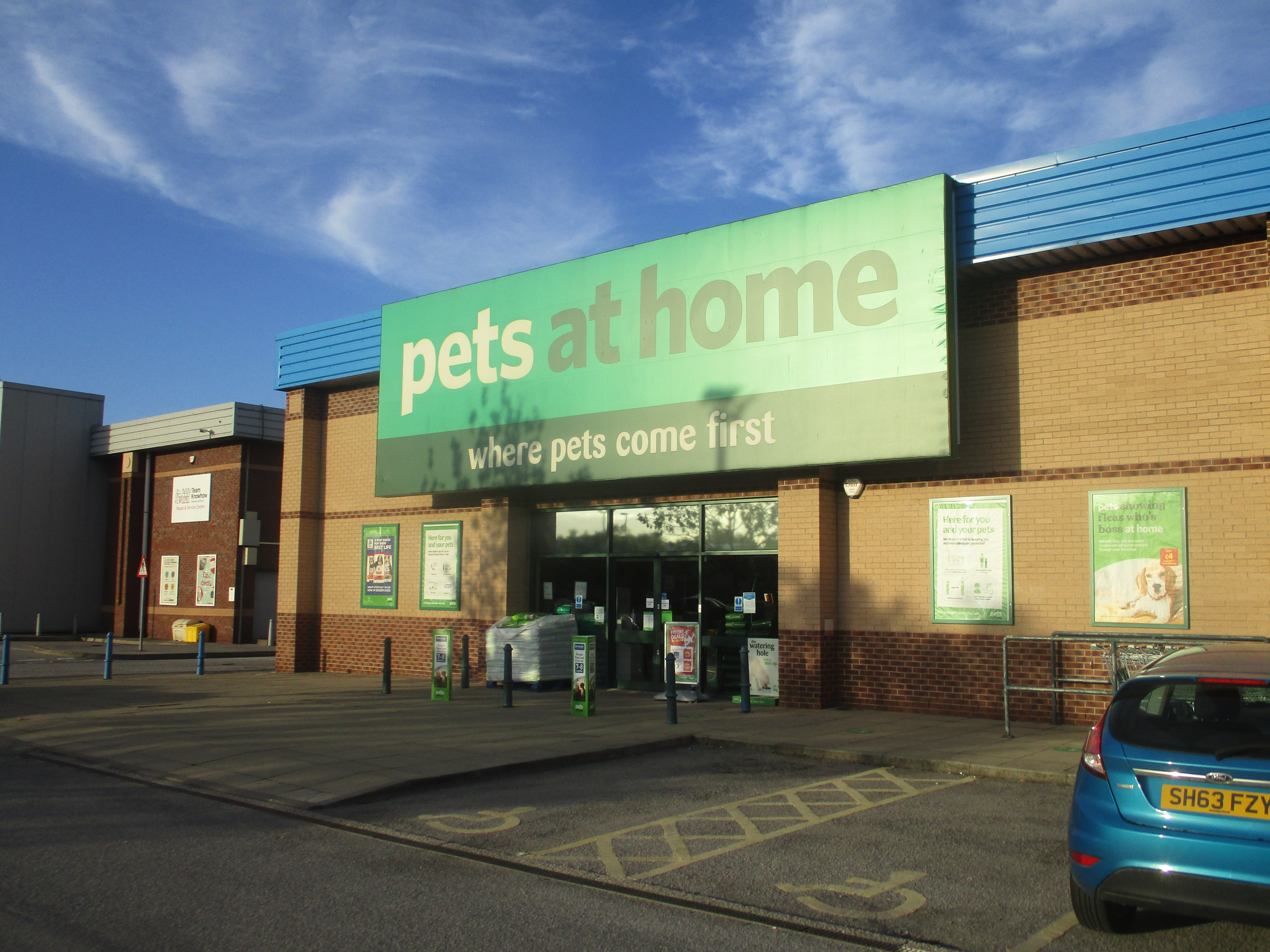
Pets at Home with more recent branding, Pontefract, West Yorkshire (2020)

Pets at Home Group PLC (sometimes shortened to Pets) or simply Pets at Home is a British retailer selling pets (not limited to rabbits, rodents and fish), pet food, toys, bedding and medication.

Founded in 1991, the company operates 453 stores across the UK, as well as an online store. The company also provides in-store services, such as grooming, veterinary care and dog training.

In March 2014, the company was the subject of an initial public offering, and has since been listed on the London Stock Exchange as a constituent of the FTSE 250 Index.

== History ==
The first store was opened in Chester in 1991, by Anthony Preston.

In December 1999, Pets at Home acquired PetSmart UK, bringing a chain of 140 stores under Pets at Home branding.

Pets at Home was sold to Bridgepoint Capital for £230 million in July 2004.

In November 2007, the 200th store, Barnstaple, opened.

On 27 January 2010, Pets at Home was sold by Bridgepoint Capital to US-based investment firm Kohlberg Kravis Roberts (KKR) for around £955 million.

In March 2014, the company was the subject of an initial public offering on the London Stock Exchange.

In January 2018, KKR sold its remaining 12.3 per cent stake in Pets at Home.

In December 2025, the company announced the appointment of James Bailey as its new Chief Executive Officer. Once Bailey joined the company, its Interim Chief Executive, Ian Burke, reassumed his role as non-executive chair.

== Operations ==
Pets at Home operate 453 stores plus 316 grooming salons; Pets at Home also operate 394 veterinary surgeries operated on a joint venture partnership model and additionally 47 group managed veterinary practices. The joint venture businesses are generally small businesses which pay a percentage of turnover as a management fee to the company for back office services. The company runs a graduate training scheme intended to produce future joint venture partners.

The company owns Vets for Pets (formerly known as Vets4Pets), a Guernsey-based veterinary business that operates a national network of joint-venture partner veterinary practices focusing on treatment of small animals (domestic pets such as dogs, cats, rabbits etc.). The company enters into joint-venture partnerships with veterinary professionals (usually a veterinary surgeon or veterinary nurse) to open new small animal practices.

== Controversies ==
The 17 September 2012 episode of BBC consumer affairs television programme Watchdog included a report on animal welfare conditions at Pets at Home. The programme had visited eight stores, as part of an investigation which included Mike Jessop, former president of the Small Animal Veterinary Association. The programme discovered evidence of mistreatment of small animals, dead fish being left to rot and be eaten in tanks, and sick small animals up for sale. That month, Pets at Home issued a full response to the claims made in the broadcast. The BBC trust published a clarification on 7 June 2016 that the website included a version of the item made before Pets at Home's points in reply to criticisms were incorporated. In response to the complaint the programme-makers acknowledged that this represented a serious breach of the BBC's editorial standards and replaced the item with a version which reflected Pets at Home's points.
