= Handforth Hall =

Former manor house in Handforth, Cheshire, England

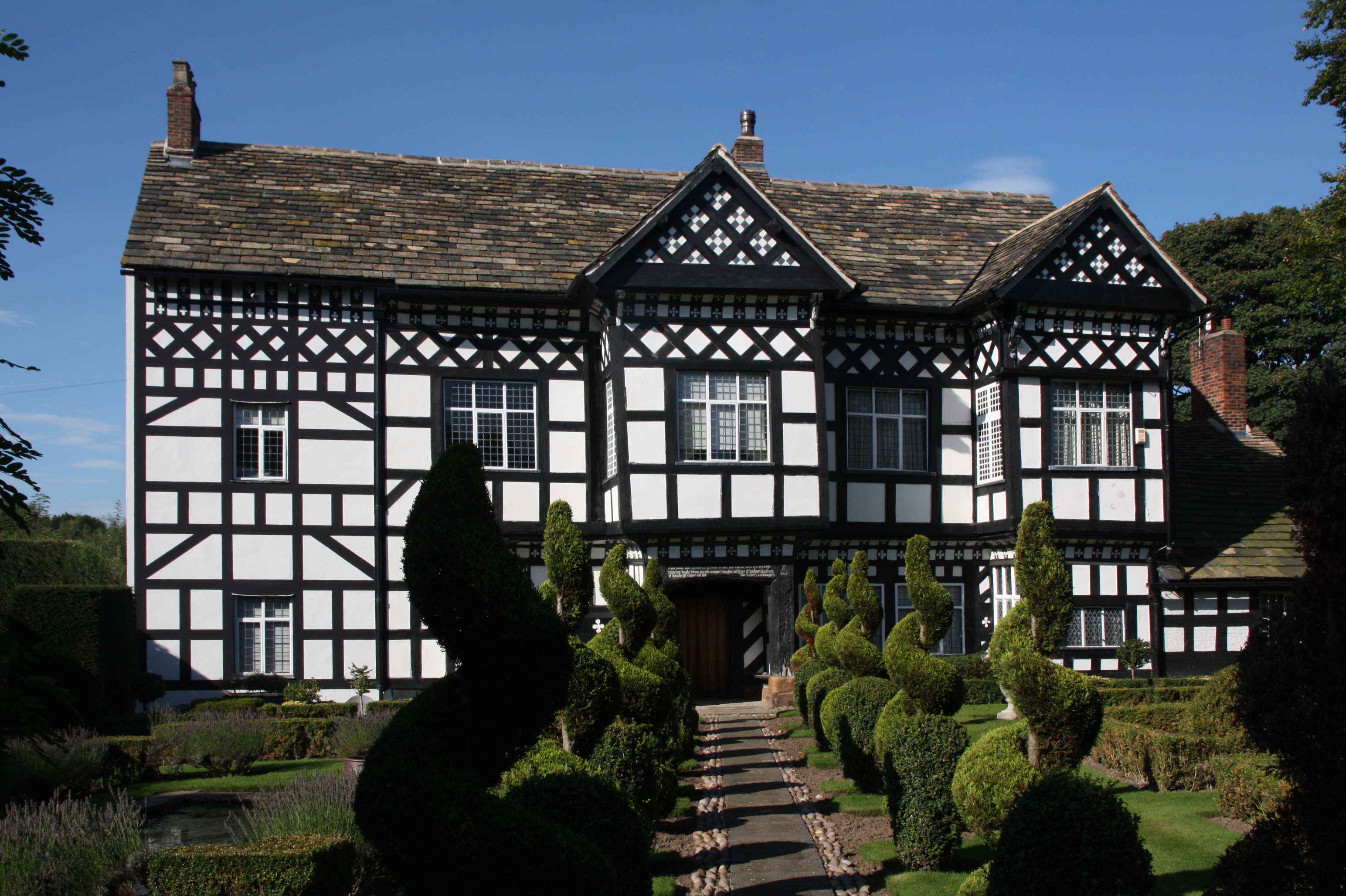

- Location in Cheshire
- 53.34648°N 2.20718°W
- Location: Handforth, Cheshire, England
- OS grid reference: SJ 863 833

History
- Built: 1562
- Built for: Sir Urian Brereton

Listed Building – Grade II*
- Designated: 30 March 1951
- Reference no.: 1222483

Handforth Hall is a former manor house in Handforth, Cheshire, England. It is dated 1562, and was built by Sir Urian Brereton. Alterations have been made to it in the 17th century, and subsequently. The hall is a timber-framed building and currently consists of a single range, with two storeys and five bays. Originally it was either E-shaped or quadrilateral in plan. The hall is recorded in the National Heritage List for England as a designated Grade II* listed building. It was at one time the home of Sir William Brereton, a Parliamentary commander in the English Civil War.

Under a coved gable by the porch entrance there is an ornately carved inscription on the lintel, reading:

"THIS HAULLE WAS BUYLDED IN THE YEARE OF OUR LORD GOD MCCCCCLXll BY URYAN BRERETON KNIGHT WHOM MARYED MARGARET DAUGHTER AND HEYRE OF WYLLYAM HANDFORTH OF HANDFORTHE ESQUYER AND HAD ISSUE VI SONNES AND II DAUGHTERS."

== See also ==
- Grade II* listed buildings in Cheshire East
- Listed buildings in Wilmslow
