= Northen Etchells =

Coordinates: 53.3884°N 2.2558°W

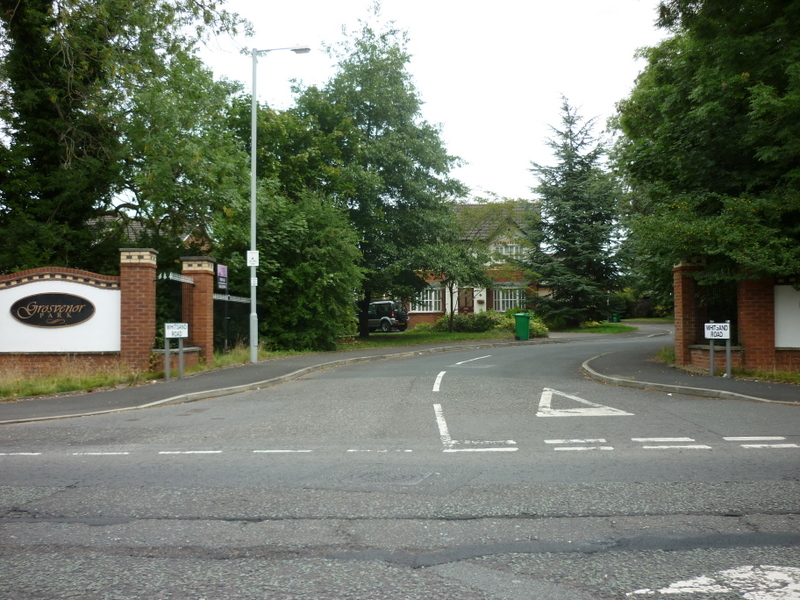
- Whitsand Road

- Location within Greater Manchester
- Metropolitan borough: Manchester
- Metropolitan county: Greater Manchester
- Region: North West
- Country: England
- Sovereign state: United Kingdom
- Police: Greater Manchester
- Fire: Greater Manchester
- Ambulance: North West

Northen Etchells was a civil parish in Cheshire, England. It was abolished in 1931 when the area was absorbed into the County Borough of Manchester.

== Toponymy ==
"Northen" is an old name for Northenden and "Etchells" came from Anglo-Saxon ēcels = "land added to an estate".

== History ==
Northen Etchells, sometimes called Northenden Etchells, was historically a township in the ancient parish of Northenden, which formed part of the Macclesfield Hundred of Cheshire. From the 17th century onwards, parishes were gradually given various civil functions under the poor laws, in addition to their original ecclesiastical functions. In some cases, including Northenden, the civil functions were exercised by each township separately rather than the parish as a whole. In 1866, the legal definition of 'parish' was changed to be the areas used for administering the poor laws, and so Northen Etchells became a separate civil parish, which therefore diverged from the ecclesiastical parish.

When elected parish and district councils were established under the Local Government Act 1894, Northen Etchells was given a parish council and included in the Altrincham Rural District (which was renamed Bucklow Rural District in 1895).

The civil parishes of Northen Etchells and Northenden were both abolished in 1931, when their areas were absorbed into the county borough of Manchester. In 1921 (the last census before its abolition) the parish of Northen Etchells had a population of 906.

== Geography ==
Whilst it existed, Northen Etchells was predominantly rural. There was no central village, but the area included a number of small farming hamlets or clusters of labourers' cottages, including Hey Head, Moss Nook, Poundswick, Sharston, Crossacres Green and Brownley green.

To the north of Northen Etchells was the township of Northenden. Stockport Etchells lay to the east, Styal to the south with Baguley and Altrincham townships to the west. Northen Etchells and Stockport Etchells were sometimes collectively referred to as Etchells.

After the area's absorption into Manchester in 1931, much of the former Northen Etchells civil parish was developed as part of Wythenshawe.
