= Handforth =

Town in Cheshire, England

Coordinates: 53.350°N 2.216°W

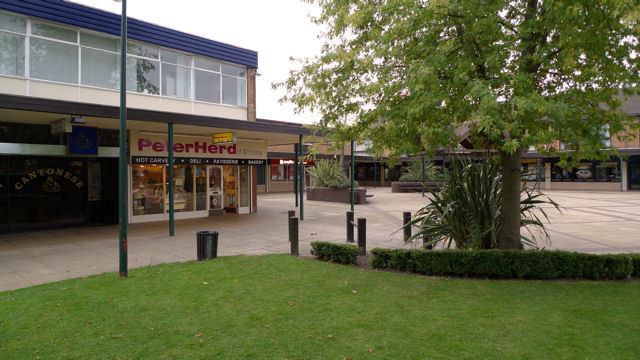
- The Paddock (Handforth Precinct)

- Location within Cheshire
- Interactive map of Handforth
- Population: 6,715 (Parish, 2021)
- OS grid reference: SJ8583
- Civil parish: Handforth
- Unitary authority: Cheshire East
- Ceremonial county: Cheshire
- Region: North West
- Country: England
- Sovereign state: United Kingdom
- Post town: WILMSLOW
- Postcode district: SK9
- Dialling code: 01625
- Police: Cheshire
- Fire: Cheshire
- Ambulance: North West
- UK Parliament: Tatton

Handforth is a town and civil parish in Cheshire, England, 9 miles (14 km) south of Manchester city centre. The population of the parish was 6,715 at the 2021 census. In the 1960s and 1970s, two overspill housing estates, Spath Lane in Handforth, and Colshaw Farm nearby in Wilmslow, were built to re-house people from inner city Manchester. It lies between Wilmslow, Heald Green, and Styal, and forms part of the Greater Manchester Built-up Area.

== History ==
Handforth, township and hamlet with r[ailwa]y. sta[tion]., Cheadle par[ish]., E. Cheshire, 5 miles SW. of Stockport, 1311 ac[res]., pop[ulation]. 736; P.O., T.O.

— John Bartholomew's Gazetteer of the British Isles, 1887,

The name "Handforth" is believed to originate from the Saxon name for a crossing on the River Dean, "Hanna's Ford". The first mention of Handforth is found in a charter dated between 1233 and 1236, with a later mention found in a deed of transfer between Lord Edmund Phitoun and Henry de Honeford, dated to 1291. (Note: The deed, which relates to the site of a water mill, "assigns a whole half of the water of Honeford between the two highways of which a certain way comes from Wilmyslawe and the other way which comes from Macclisfeld and extends itself beyond said water towards Bolleschawehefd". A copy of the deed is held by the John Rylands Library.) The settlement is not mentioned in the Domesday Book of 1086, though it may have, at that time, been recorded as a component part of the parish of Cheadle.

During the Crusades, Handforth acquired its own coat of arms, which include the 'Honford Star', emblem of Henry de Honeford, a member of the local nobility. The town was referred to as "Honford" in John Speede's map of the area in 1611, also named after the de Honford family.

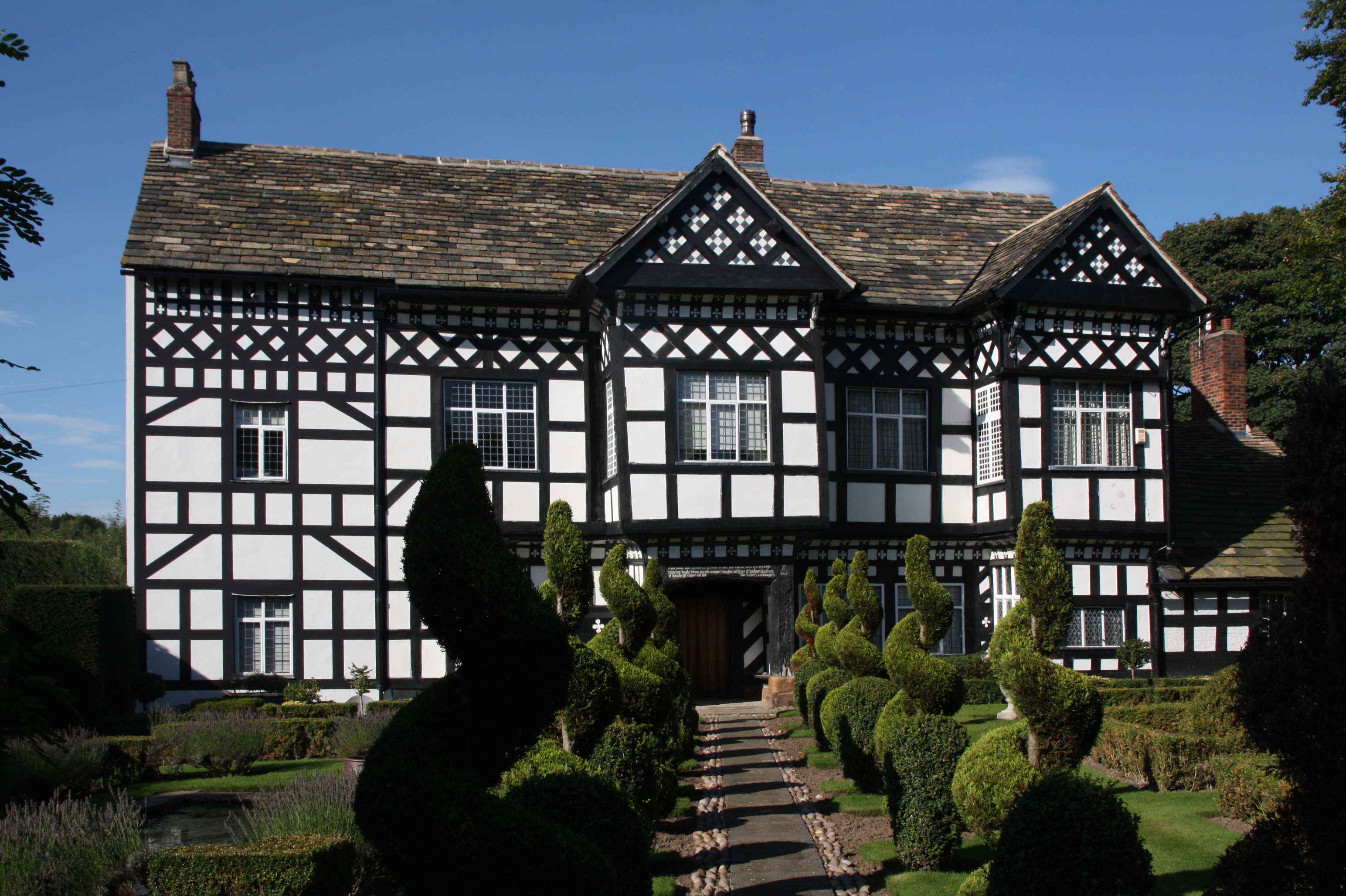
Handforth Hall

The oldest building in Handforth is Handforth Hall, a typical Tudor-styled black and white timber building built by Sir Urian Brereton in 1562, also originally named "Honford Hall" after the de Honfords. Sir Urian Brereton, the escheator of Cheshire and one of the privy grooms to King Henry VIII, died at Handforth Hall on 19 March 1577, and is thought to be buried in one of the chapels of St Mary's Church, Cheadle. In the church's south chapel, two recumbent effigies depicted in alabaster are thought to represent members of the Hondford family; Sir John, who died in 1461, and his son, also named John. A third, depicted in sandstone, represents Sir Thomas Brereton, who died in 1673. The most famous resident of Handforth is Sir Urian's great-grandson, the Parliamentary General Sir William Brereton, 1st Baronet, who fought in the English Civil War.

During the First World War, an internment camp was set up in Handforth, for both civilian and military prisoners. The site, converted from a disused print works built in 1910 and requisitioned by the War Office in 1914, was designed to hold no more than 3,000 men, and was opened on 6 November 1914 with the arrival of 500 prisoners. From May 1915, following the aftermath of a number of Anti-German riots which swept a number of cities in England, the camp's civilian population increased, following decisions to intern 'enemy aliens', with a number of men sent to Handforth from Liverpool. The camp was inspected by an attaché to the American Embassy in London on 1 April 1916, at which a time there were 2,713 prisoners living in the camp.

At the height of the camp's operations, the interned population of the camp was greater than that of the village of Handforth itself; later in the war, when German soldiers captured from the front lines began to arrive, the local population started to take a greater interest in the camp, and would watch the new arrivals, with crowds gathering at the nearby railway station. The Manchester Evening News reported on 17 March 1915: "Great excitement prevailed at Handforth and Wilmslow today when it became generally known that about 600 German prisoners taken during heavy fighting in the North of France were expected to arrive for internment at the concentration camp."

During the Second World War, Handforth, along with Cheadle Hulme, became home to large parts of RAF Handforth, a maintenance unit classed as a universal stores depot, with the official Royal Air Force name 'RAF Handforth No 61 M.U. (Maintenance unit)'. The depot, which covered large areas of land in both Handforth and neighbouring Cheadle Hulme, opened in 1939 and closed in 1959. The depot's stores spanned every single item required by the RAF in wartime, from utensils and everyday tools to aircraft engines. The site was served by a large, internal railway system, which left the Manchester to Crewe mainline near Handforth railway station; the site of the exchange sidings and junction is now found on the modern-day Epsom Avenue. The depot also featured its own shunting locomotives, which were stored in an engine shed that stood at the Wilmslow bound exit slip road for the Handforth Dean shopping centre. The only surviving buildings of RAF Handforth are the government pay offices, now found on Dairyhouse Lane; these buildings, used as the headquarters of the depot, have survived in Ministry of Defence use to this day.

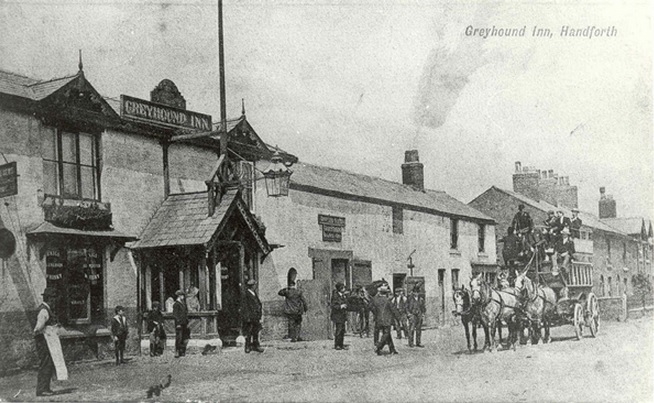
Greyhound Inn, Handforth, c. 1905 (since demolished)

In January 2017, government plans were announced to build a garden village on the eastern margin of Handforth village, to include 2,000 houses with facilities including a nursery and care home.

== Geography ==
Handforth borders Heald Green to the north and Wilmslow to the south, between the Cheshire Plain and the Pennines. The area lies near the River Dean, a tributary of the River Bollin that flows north–west and eventually joins the River Mersey near Lymm. The local geology is mostly glacial clay, as well as glacial sands and gravel.

The majority of buildings in the area are houses dating to the 20th and 21st centuries, with a small number of buildings - such as that of Handforth Hall - dating to before this time.

=== Climate ===
Handforth experiences a temperate maritime climate, like much of the British Isles, with relatively cool summers and mild winters.

Handforth

Climate chart (precipitation, max. and min. temperature)
J	F	M	A	M	J	J	A	S	O	N	D
69 8 −2	70 8 2	50 10 3	63 13 5	51 16 8	58 19 10	54 21 12	69 21 12	63 18 10	88 14 7	82 10 4	78 7 2
- █ Average max. and min. temperatures in °C
- █ Precipitation totals in mm
- Source: Climate-Charts.com
Imperial conversion
J	F	M	A	M	J	J	A	S	O	N	D
2.7 46 28	2.8 46 36	2 50 37	2.5 55 41	2 61 46	2.3 66 50	2.1 70 54	2.7 70 54	2.5 64 50	3.5 57 45	3.2 50 39	3.1 45 36
- █ Average max. and min. temperatures in °F
- █ Precipitation totals in inches

Climate data for Handforth
Month	Jan	Feb	Mar	Apr	May	Jun	Jul	Aug	Sep	Oct	Nov	Dec	Year
Record high °C (°F)	15 (59)	17 (63)	19 (66)	25 (77)	27 (81)	29 (84)	32 (90)	34 (93)	27 (81)	23 (73)	18 (64)	15 (59)	34 (93)
Mean daily maximum °C (°F)	8 (46)	8 (46)	10 (50)	13 (55)	16 (61)	19 (66)	21 (70)	21 (70)	18 (64)	14 (57)	10 (50)	7 (45)	14 (57)
Mean daily minimum °C (°F)	−2 (28)	2 (36)	3 (37)	5 (41)	8 (46)	10 (50)	12 (54)	12 (54)	10 (50)	7 (45)	4 (39)	2 (36)	6 (43)
Record low °C (°F)	−8 (18)	−8 (18)	−8 (18)	−4 (25)	−2 (28)	1 (34)	5 (41)	2 (36)	−1 (30)	−4 (25)	−8 (18)	−12 (10)	−12 (10)
Average precipitation mm (inches)	69 (2.7)	70 (2.8)	50 (2.0)	63 (2.5)	51 (2.0)	58 (2.3)	54 (2.1)	69 (2.7)	63 (2.5)	88 (3.5)	82 (3.2)	78 (3.1)	795 (31.3)
Source: My Weather 2

== Physical geography ==
The eastern half of Cheshire, in which Handforth is located, is Upper Triassic Mercia Mudstone laid down with large salt deposits, which were mined for hundreds of years around Northwich. Separating this area from Lower Triassic Sherwood Sandstone to the west is a prominent sandstone ridge known as the Mid Cheshire Ridge. A 55-kilometre (34 mi) footpath, the Sandstone Trail, follows this ridge from Frodsham to Whitchurch, passing Delamere Forest, Beeston Castle and earlier Iron Age forts.

== Governance ==
There are two tiers of local government covering Handforth, at parish (town) and unitary authority level: Handforth Town Council and Cheshire East Council. The town council is based at the Community Centre on Old Road.

Handforth forms part of the Tatton constituency, represented by Esther McVey, a Conservative.

=== Administrative history ===
Handforth was historically a township in the ancient parish of Cheadle, which formed part of the Macclesfield Hundred of Cheshire. From the 13th century the township also included a detached area 5 miles (8.0 km) to the north-east called Bosden, which included the eastern side of Hazel Grove. The township was thereafter sometimes known as 'Handforth-cum-Bosden'.

From the 17th century onwards, parishes were gradually given various civil functions under the poor laws, in addition to their original ecclesiastical functions. In some cases, including Cheadle, the civil functions were exercised by each township rather than the parish as a whole. In 1866, the legal definition of 'parish' was changed to be the areas used for administering the poor laws, and so Handforth-cum-Bosden became a civil parish, which therefore diverged from the ecclesiastical parish. In 1878, Handforth and Bosden were made separate civil parishes.

When elected parish and district councils were established in 1894, Handforth was given a parish council and included in the Stockport Rural District. In 1904, the parish was converted into an urban district. Handforth Urban District was abolished in 1936. Most of the area, including the village, was then absorbed into the Wilmslow Urban District, whilst a smaller area to the north was added to the Cheadle and Gatley Urban District.

Wilmslow Urban District was abolished in 1974 under the Local Government Act 1972. As part of those reforms, the area had been considered for possible inclusion within Greater Manchester, but it was ultimately decided to place it in the borough of Macclesfield. No successor parish was created for the former urban district, and so it became unparished, being directly administered by Macclesfield Borough Council. In 2009, Cheshire East Council was created, taking over the functions of the borough council and Cheshire County Council, which were both abolished.

In 2011, the area of the former Wilmslow Urban District was split into three new parishes called Wilmslow, Handforth, and Styal.

Handforth Parish Council received international attention in February 2021 after a heated Zoom meeting of its Planning and Environment Committee went viral. This event spawned a number of memes and mainstream media coverage. After gaining online traction on the evening of 4 February, attendee Jackie Weaver's name was the highest trending topic on Twitter in the United Kingdom that night and the following day.

In August 2021 the parish council exercised its power under the Local Government Act 1972 to declare the parish to be a town, allowing the council to change its name to Handforth Town Council.

== Demography ==
=== Population ===
The historic population of Handforth was 650 in 1851, and 911 in 1901. According to the United Kingdom Census 2021, the population of the Handforth Ward was 9,784. This compares to the United Kingdom Census 2011, where the Handforth Ward has a population of 9,139 people. This is an increase from the data in the 2001 Census, when the Handforth Ward had a population of 8,014 people. The gender composition of Handforth is made up of 50.8% (4,640) females and 49.2% (4,499) males.

Historical populations

Year	Population	±%
1831	591	—
1841	681	+15.2%
1851	650	−4.6%
1861	629	−3.2%
1871	662	+5.2%
1881	736	+11.2%
1891	794	+7.9%
1901	911	+14.7%
1911	934	+2.5%
1921	904	−3.2%

Year	Population	±%
1931	1,031	+14.0%
1941	-	—
1951	-	—
1961	3,254	—
1971	7,537	+131.6%
1981	6,843	−9.2%
1991	6,343	−7.3%
2001	8,014	+26.3%
2011	9,138	+14.0%
2021	9,784	+7.1%

Source: Cheshire County Council: Township Pack No 48.

=== Ethnicity ===
Handforth Compared
2011 UK Census	Handforth	Cheshire East	England
Total population	9,138	370,127	53,012,456
White	91.6%	96.7%	85.5%
Asian	4.7%	1.6%	7.7%
Black	0.8%	0.4%	3.4%

According to the 2011 Census, ethnic white groups (British, Irish, other) account for 91.6% (8,375) of the population, against 96.8% in the previous 2001 census, with 8.4% (764 people) being in ethnic groups other than white.

Of the 8.4% (764 people) in non-white ethnic groups:

- 21.6% (165) belonged to mixed ethnic groups
- 56.4% (431) were Asian or Asian British
- 11.9% (91) belonged to other ethnic groups
- 10.1% (77) were Black or Black British

=== Religion ===
According to the 2011 Census, a breakdown of the religious groups and denominations in Handforth showed a majority (79.2% in 2001, 63.5% in 2011) Christian population, with the second-largest recorded group being people with no religion (12.8% in 2001, rising to 24.5% in 2011), followed by Handforth's Muslim population (1% in 2001, rising to 2.7% in 2011):

- Christian - 79.2% (6,345 people), 2001; 63.5% (5,805 people), 2011
- No religion - 12.8% (1,026 people), 2001; 24.5% (2,244 people), 2011
- Religion not stated - 5.9% (473 people), 2001; 6.8% (621 people), 2011
- Muslim - 1% (82 people), 2001; 2.7% (250 people), 2011
- Hindu - 0.4% (31 people), 2001; 0.9% (78 people), 2011
- Jewish - 0.3% (27 people), 2001; 0.4% (36 people), 2011
- Buddhist - 0.2% (12 people), 2001; 0.3% (28 people), 2011
- Sikh - 0.1% (8 people), 2001; 0.5% (43 people), 2011
- Other religions - 0.1% (10 people), 2001; 0.4% (34 people), 2011

==== Places of worship ====
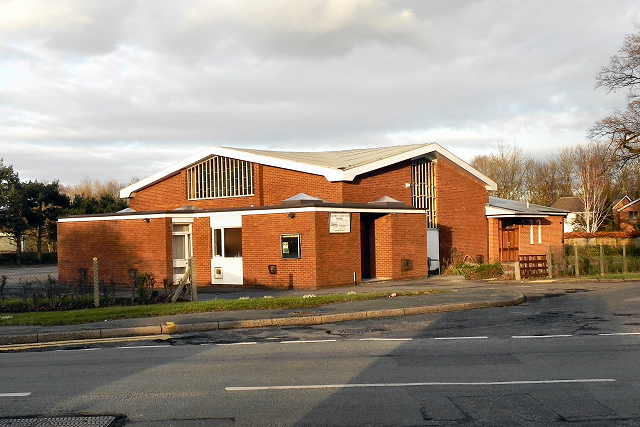
St Benedict's Roman Catholic Church

There are three churches in Handforth:

St Mary's Methodist Church was built in 1872, though Methodism was present in the Handforth and Wilmslow area long before this. It is recorded that John Wesley preached at nearby Finney Green on 1 September 1748.

St Benedict's Roman Catholic Church is part of the Diocese of Shrewsbury, and was officially opened by the Bishop of Shrewsbury on 29 November 1968. The church is noted for its connection to Ambrose Barlow, an English Benedictine monk whose mother was born at Handforth Hall.

St Chad's Church of England, part of the Diocese of Chester, is an Anglican church based in Handforth. During the 19th century, a chapel of ease was built in Handforth, then part of the parish of Cheadle. The chapel was consecrated in 1837 as a chapel to St Mary's Church, Cheadle, becoming the parish church for Handforth and part of Cheadle in 1877. Due to the growth of the population of Handforth in the late 19th century, the chapel went through extensive redevelopment and expansion, and the new building - known as St Chad's Church - was consecrated by Francis Jayne, Bishop of Chester on St Chad's day, 2 March, in 1899.

== Transport ==
Handforth railway station is on the Crewe to Manchester line, a spur off the West Coast Main Line. Regular services are operated by Northern Trains between Manchester Piccadilly and Crewe, via Levenshulme, Stockport, Cheadle Hulme and Wilmslow.

The A34 by-pass is to the east. The main thoroughfare is Wilmslow Road (B5358).

Manchester Airport lies 3.5 miles (5.6 km) to the north-west, although Handforth lies away from the airport's approach and departure routes; it therefore suffers only slightly from aircraft noise.

Metroline Manchester provides a bus service between Handforth Dean and Manchester city centre, via Cheadle and East Didsbury.

== Media ==
Local news and television programmes are provided by BBC North West and ITV Granada. Television signals are received from the Winter Hill TV transmitter.

Local radio stations are BBC Radio Manchester, Heart North West, Smooth North West, Capital Manchester and Lancashire, Greatest Hits Radio Manchester & The North West, Silk Radio and Canalside Radio, a community-based station.

The town is served by the local newspapers, The Wilmslow Express and Knutsford Guardian.

== Economy ==
Handforth Dean is a retail park that houses shops such as Tesco, Marks & Spencer, JD Sports and Boots (company) , and is situated by the A34 bypass. Pets at Home has its headquarters in Handforth.

== Public services ==
=== Health ===
Handforth Health Centre, purpose-built in 1975, was purchased from the Health Authority by the GPs in 1992 and completely refurbished.

=== Schools ===
Handforth is served by three primary schools: Handforth Grange (formerly Wilmslow Grange, 1951–2019), Dean Oaks Primary and St Benedict's RC Primary.

=== Police ===
Handforth is served by Cheshire Constabulary, with the closest branch being based in Wilmslow.

=== Fire ===
Cheshire Fire and Rescue Service is the fire service that caters for Handforth, with the nearest fire station being located in Wilmslow.

== Sport ==
Handforth Hall Tennis Club, founded in 1850, has three hard courts. The Men's team competes in Division 9 of the Slazenger North East Cheshire Lawn Tennis League, whilst the Ladies' team competes in Division 7. The club also features tennis coaching, and the small pavilion hosts table tennis, carpet bowling and auction bridge.

== Notable people ==
- Sir Urian Brereton (1505–1577), Groom of the Privy Chamber to King Henry VIII, died at Handforth Hall
- Sir William Brereton, 1st Baronet (1604 at Handforth Hall – 1661), religious Independent, author, MP & landowner.
- William Robert Renshaw (1845 – 1923), an English industrialist and foundryman.
- John Shipley Rowlinson (1926–2018), scientist and historian of science.
- Paul Turnbull (born 1989), footballer who has played over 500 games, currently player manager of Stockport Town F.C.
- Jackie Weaver (born 1958), The former Chief Officer of the Handforth Parish Council.

== Facilities ==
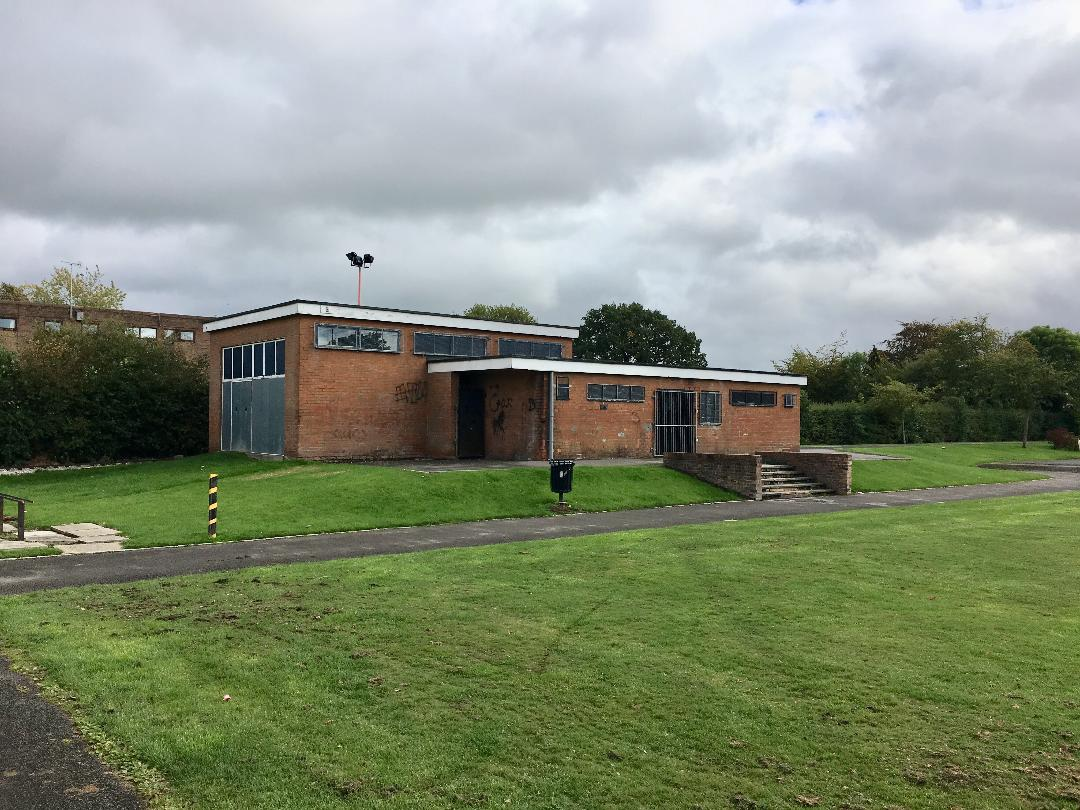
Pavilion at Meriton Park

=== Parks ===
Meriton Road Park, opened in 1935, covers an area of 3.4 hectares (8.4 acres) and is situated to the rear of the Paddock Shopping Centre. Until the mid-1980s, the park was the site for the Handforth Gala. Current attractions in the park include a multi-sport court, tennis courts and a miniature railway, which is operated by the Handforth Model Engineering Society.

Stanley Hall Park is situated between the Spath Lane Estate and the railway line from Handforth to Cheadle Hulme. The park was donated by Manchester City Council in the early 1960s. The park is owned and maintained by Cheshire East Council's environmental partner Ansa, and has an active 'friends of the park' group. Facilities include the Swingtime play areas and Multi-Use Games Area donated by Spath Lane Residents Association, and a 52-seat all-inclusive picnic area with space for 15 wheelchairs or buggies and a concrete skatepark installed by the Friends of Stanley Hall Park in 2015–16.
