= Cheadle and Gatley Urban District =

Urban district of Cheshire, England

Coordinates: 53°23′N 2°13′W

Cheadle and Gatley
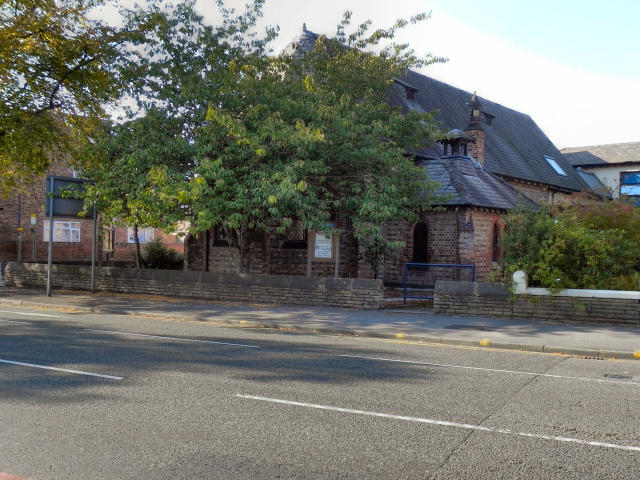

- Cheadle and Gatley UD within Cheshire in 1970
- History
  - Created: 1894
  - Abolished: 1974
  - Succeeded by: Metropolitan Borough of Stockport
- Status: Urban district, Civil parish

Cheadle and Gatley was an administrative district in Cheshire, England, from 1886 until 1974. It was a local government district from 1886 to 1894 and then an urban district from 1894 until 1974.

== History ==
The Cheadle and Gatley local government district was created in 1886. It was administered by an elected local board. The district covered the parts of the township of Cheadle that were not within the municipal borough boundaries of Stockport, plus the township of Stockport Etchells, which was a detached part of the parish of Stockport in which the main settlement was Gatley.

Local government districts were reconstituted as urban districts under the Local Government Act 1894. The 1894 Act also said that civil parishes (including townships such as Cheadle and Stockport Etchells) could no longer straddle district or borough boundaries. Cheadle parish was therefore reduced to just cover the area within the urban district. The urban district then contained the two civil parishes of Cheadle and Stockport Etchells until 1930, when they were merged into a single parish called Cheadle and Gatley covering the whole urban district.

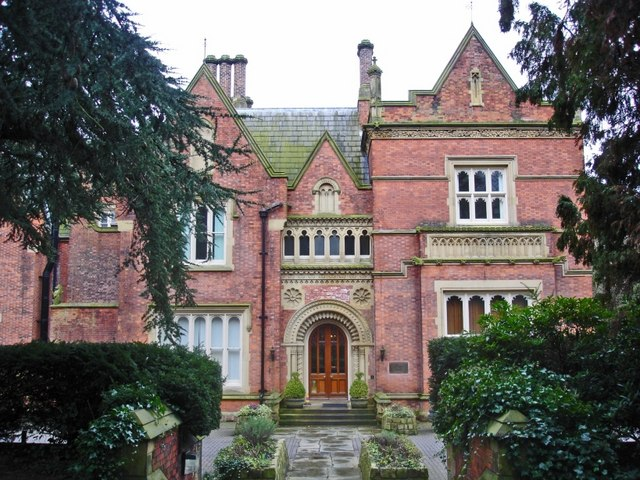
Abney Hall, Cheadle: Urban District Council's headquarters 1960–1974

The urban district council used Bruntwood Hall as its town hall from 1944 to 1959, and Abney Hall from 1960 to 1974.

Cheadle and Gatley Urban District was abolished in 1974 under the Local Government Act 1972. The area became part of the Metropolitan Borough of Stockport in Greater Manchester.

Between 2004 and 2023 there was a Cheadle and Gatley electoral ward, which covered a smaller area than the pre-1974 urban district.
