= Hazel Grove =

Village in Greater Manchester, England

Coordinates: 53.375°N 2.111°W

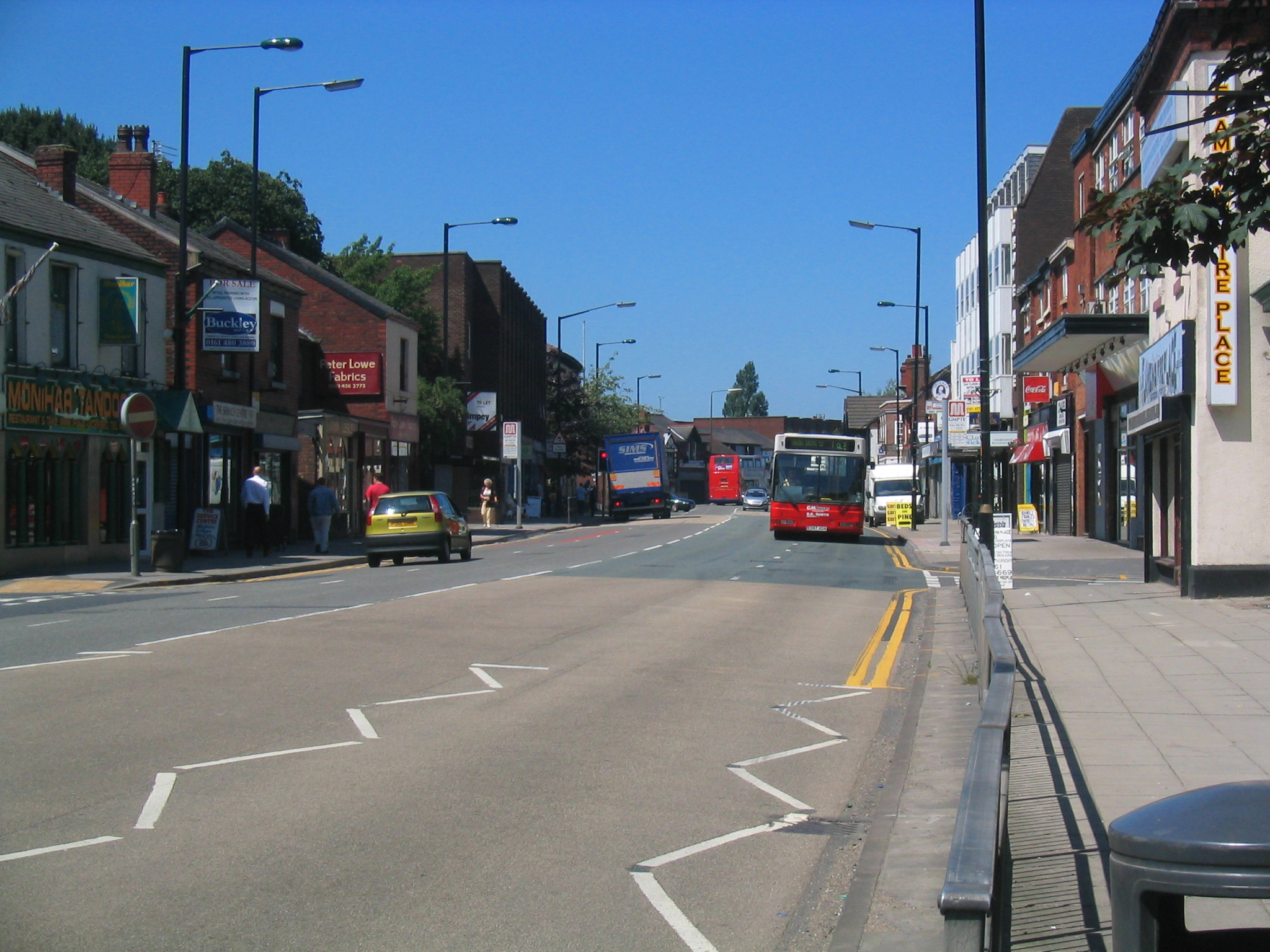
- London Road, the major road through Hazel Grove

- Location within Greater Manchester
- Area: 4.19 km^{2} (1.62 sq mi)
- Population: 20,170 (Built-up area, 2021)
  - Density: 4,814/km^{2} (12,470/sq mi)
- OS grid reference: SJ925865
- Metropolitan borough: Stockport
- Metropolitan county: Greater Manchester
- Region: North West
- Country: England
- Sovereign state: United Kingdom
- Post town: STOCKPORT
- Postcode district: SK6, SK7
- Dialling code: 0161, 01625
- Police: Greater Manchester
- Fire: Greater Manchester
- Ambulance: North West
- UK Parliament: Hazel Grove; Cheadle

Hazel Grove is a village in the Metropolitan Borough of Stockport, Greater Manchester, England. It lies within the historic county boundaries of Cheshire and became part of Greater Manchester in 1974. The built-up area, as defined by the Office for National Statistics, had a population of 20,170 at the 2021 census.

== History ==
Until the 16th century, there was very little development at Hazel Grove. The area straddled the boundaries of four townships or manors: Bosden, Bramhall, Norbury and Torkington. Norbury was mentioned in the Domesday Survey in 1086 (as Nordberie).

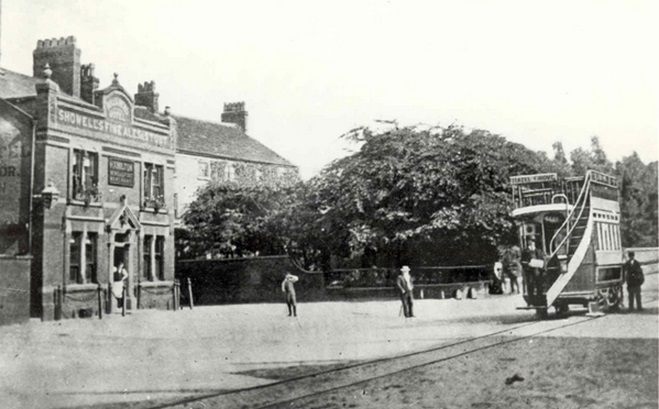
The Bull's Head pub and Bullock Smithy Inn at the Hazel Grove tram terminus, c. 1900

In 1560, a blacksmith called Richard Bullock built a smithy on the corner of what is now Torkington Park. This building later became the Bullock Smithy Inn. It stood on the main road from Manchester and Stockport to Buxton and London, later numbered as the A6 road. A village known as Bullock Smithy gradually grew up along the road. The name Hazel Grove, referring to a grove of hazel trees, was also sometimes used for the area, appearing on a 1749 map as 'Hessel-grave'. In 1836, the villagers of Bullock Smithy held a public meeting and resolved to formally adopt the name Hazel Grove for the village.

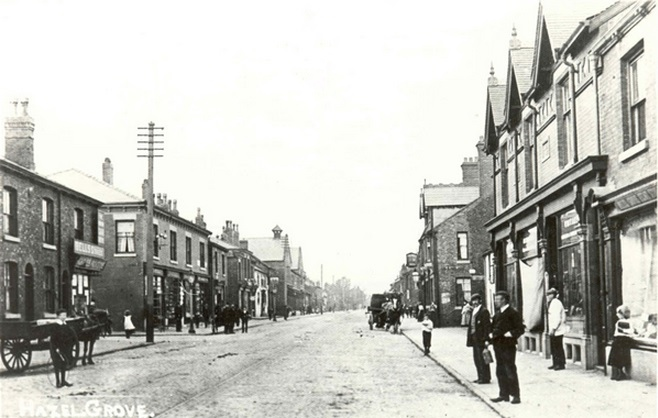
London Road, c. 1900

A tram line from Stockport to Hazel Grove opened in 1890, running along London Road to a terminus near the Rising Sun public house at the corner of Buxton Road and Macclesfield Road. The line was initially run by a private company, but became part of Stockport Corporation Tramways in 1905. Through services into Manchester via the connected Manchester Corporation Tramways network operated from 1908. The tram route closed in 1950.

A Mechanics' Institute was built in 1871 at the corner of London Road and Hatherlow Lane, serving as the village's main public events venue. The charity that originally ran the building transferred ownership to the Hazel Grove and Bramhall Urban District Council in 1952, who later renamed it the Civic Hall.

=== Religion ===
There were no churches in the area until the end of the 16th century. By the early 17th century, a chapel had been built in Norbury township. It stood in fields to the east of Macclesfield Road, opposite Norbury Hall Farm, nearly a mile south of Hazel Grove. The chapel was known for being served by Nonconformist ministers in the late 17th century. After the Restoration, a law was passed in 1662 forbidding ministers to preach without the Book of Common Prayer. The minister of Norbury Chapel, John Jollie, went there to preach, but found that the door was locked. He and his followers broke down the door and he preached as usual. Subsequently, he was tried for nonconformity, but it was decided that Norbury Chapel was not a consecrated place.

In 1788, John Wesley preached in Bullock Smithy. In his journal he described the village as "... one of the most famous villages in the county for all manner of wickedness."

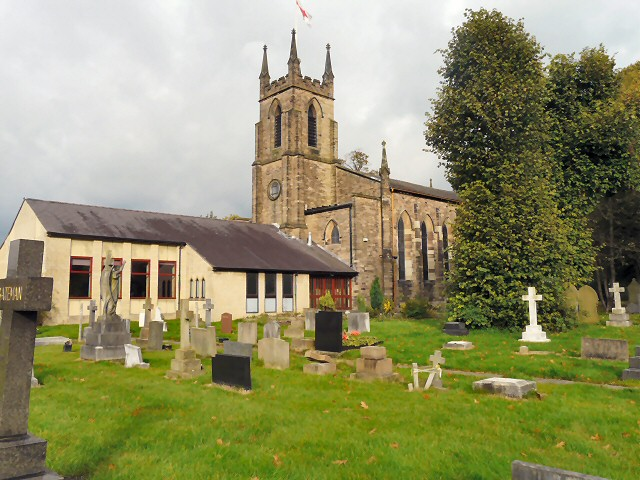
St Thomas' Church

In the 1830s, it was decided to build a new church, both to serve the growing village and to replace the increasingly ruinous Norbury Chapel. The site chosen was on the southern edge of the village, and was also in Norbury township. The church, dedicated to St Thomas, was completed in 1834. The site of Norbury Chapel then reverted to fields. In 1842 an ecclesiastical parish called 'St Thomas, Norbury' was created, which initially just covered the Norbury township. The ecclesiastical parish was enlarged in 1878 to take in Bosden and parts of Bramhall and Torkington townships, such that it then covered the whole of Hazel Grove village.

The legal name of the ecclesiastical parish covering Hazel Grove remains 'St Thomas, Norbury'. The church is now known both as 'Norbury Church' and 'St Thomas, Hazel Grove'.

== Governance ==
There is one main tier of local government covering Hazel Grove, Stockport Metropolitan Borough Council. The council is a member of the Greater Manchester Combined Authority, which is led by the directly-elected Mayor of Greater Manchester. The suburb gives its name to the Hazel Grove ward for elections to Stockport Council and to the Hazel Grove constituency for parliamentary elections.

The majority of the village lies within the Hazel Grove parliamentary constituency, which is currently represented by Lisa Smart of the Liberal Democrats. The western part of Hazel Grove lies within the Cheadle parliamentary constituency which is currently represented by Tom Morrison also of the Liberal Democrats.

=== Administrative history ===
The village of Hazel Grove historically straddled the boundaries of Bosden, Bramhall, Norbury and Torkington. Bosden was a detached part of the township of Handforth (also known as Handforth-cum-Bosden), which formed part of the ancient parish of Cheadle. Bramhall, Norbury and Torkington were all townships within the parish of Stockport.

From the 17th century onwards, parishes were gradually given various civil functions under the poor laws, in addition to their original ecclesiastical functions. In some cases, including Stockport and Cheadle, the civil functions were exercised by each township rather than the parish as a whole. In 1866, the legal definition of 'parish' was changed to be the areas used for administering the poor laws, and so Bramhall, Norbury, Torkington, and Handforth-cum-Bosden each became separate civil parishes. Bosden, which lay some 5 miles (8.0 km) away from the rest of its parish at Handforth, was subsequently made a separate civil parish in 1878.

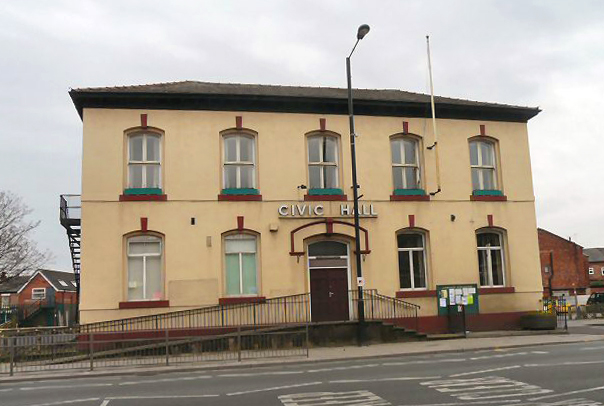
The Civic Hall, built in 1871 as the Mechanics' Institute

When elected parish and district councils were created in 1894, Bosden, Bramhall, Norbury and Torkington were each given a parish council and were included in the Stockport Rural District. Shortly afterwards, Stockport Borough Council began campaigning to have the various small parishes just outside its southern boundaries (most of which had formerly been townships in the parish of Stockport) incorporated into the County Borough of Stockport. The parish councils of Bramhall, Bosden, Norbury, Torkington and neighbouring Offerton (to the north of the suburb) collectively decided that they wished to resist being brought into Stockport, and therefore petitioned Cheshire County Council to create an urban district covering the combined area of their five parishes. The county council agreed, and the five parishes were therefore abolished in September 1900, with the area becoming the new civil parish and urban district of Hazel Grove and Bramhall.

Hazel Grove was the largest settlement within the Hazel Grove and Bramhall Urban District, and the council chose to base itself there, initially at offices on London Road. In 1935, the urban district council bought Torkington Lodge, opening the grounds to the public as Torkington Park and converting the main house into its headquarters, with the council's first meeting there being in January 1937.

Hazel Grove and Bramhall was abolished in 1974 to become part of the Metropolitan Borough of Stockport in Greater Manchester.

== Transport ==
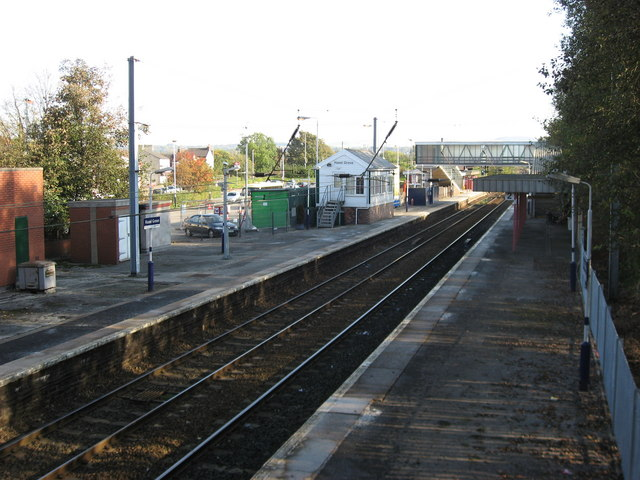
Hazel Grove station

Notable features of Hazel Grove include the A6 road, a major thoroughfare which connects Luton with Carlisle, passes through the centre of the area. After several plans to build a by-pass which did not come to fruition, consent was given in 2014 for a new Manchester Airport Relief Road (an extension of the A555 road) passing to the south of Hazel Grove, designed to take some of the traffic from the A6. The road opened in October 2018.

The area is served by Hazel Grove railway station, which is on the Hope Valley and Buxton lines from Stockport. Regular services, operated by Northern Trains, reach Stockport, Manchester Piccadilly and Buxton. Hazel Grove (Midland) station was situated between the railway overbridges at the south end of the town and was only open from 1902 until 1917.

Bus services in the area are operated by Stagecoach Manchester, Diamond Bus North West, High Peak Buses and Belle Vue Coaches. Hazel Grove is the southern terminus for the 192 bus route, which runs along the A6 to Manchester via Stockport. Other routes connect the area with Buxton, Manchester Airport and Hawk Green.

== Education ==
The area has four state primary schools: Hazel Grove, Torkington, Norbury Hall and Moorfield. In addition, there are two Catholic primary schools: St Simon's and St Peter's.

Hazel Grove High School provides secondary education for the area's 11–18 year olds.

== Economy ==
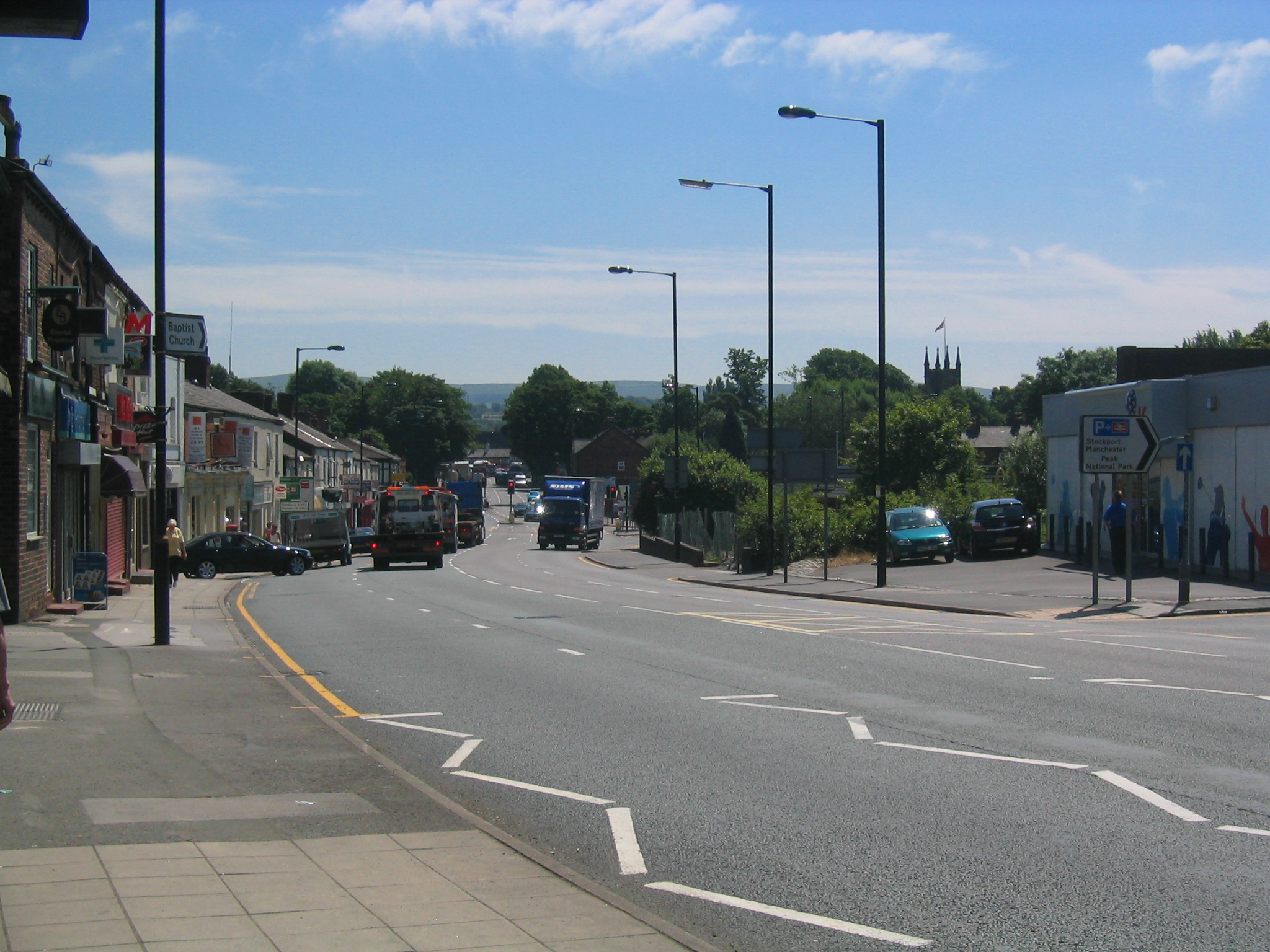
London Road

Most residents work outside the village. Hazel Grove was also home to the UK Adidas headquarters, who had their main warehouse on the edge of the village, and the nearby Stepping Hill Hospital which is the main maternity and A&E hospital serving the Stockport and south Manchester areas.

Mirlees, Bickerton and Day established a factory in October 1908, where diesel engines were manufactured for many years.

Nexperia (formerly NXP, Philips, Mullard) have a semiconductor manufacturing plant (wafer Fab) off Bramhall Moor Lane in Hazel Grove. The site has been there for over 25 years and currently employs around 1100 people. Before that, the site was at School Street, which has an interesting history. Before 1939, the site beside the Marcliff (later Warwick) cinema at the south end of the village had a garage and petrol station (opposite Jack Sharp's greyhound track), which was converted at the outbreak of war into an aircraft factory, occupying the entire triangle between Macclesfield Road and the two railway lines. This seemed also to have been extended behind the Norbury Church, in School Street. At the end of the war, prefabs were built. The Macclesfield Road site was taken over later for pharmaceuticals by British Schering. Eventually, G.E.C. started a transistor factory at the School St address. Both of these locations are now light industrial estates housing a number of small businesses, some still in the original buildings.

Hazel Grove's main shopping street, London Road, and its surrounding area is the largest district centre in Stockport Borough with a diverse range of small shops and larger supermarkets, public houses, restaurants and takeaways.

== Sport and recreation ==
Speedway racing was staged at the Hazel Grove Greyhound Stadium in 1937, although details of the meetings are sketchy. Greyhound racing meetings were held every Saturday afternoon for many years, until the track was closed around 1960. In the 1970s, part of the site was made into an extension of the local football pitches on Torkington Park for amateur teams to use, until the site was sold and redeveloped; partly as a Carpetright store, partly as the Greyhound Industrial Estate.

The area has two recreational centres: Hazel Grove Sports Centre, in the grounds of the high school, and Life Leisure on Jackson's Lane, which includes a swimming pool.

Hazel Grove Snooker Club, on Macclesfield Road, has been a notable centre of national snooker competitions since its establishment in November 1984. Being one of the largest snooker venues in the UK, the club has hosted a substantial number of WPBSA (later WSA) and ESPB competitions throughout the last three decades, leading to two confirmed and referee-verified 147 breaks at the club (Jason Prince in British Open Qualifier, 13 January 1999, and Nick Dyson in UK Tour Event 4, 2 March 1999).

The club has also hosted major disability sports events, such as the WDBS Northern Classic 2019 for participants with learning and physical disabilities and the WDBS DS Active Workshop 2019 providing snooker training for players with Down's Syndrome.

There is also a tennis and bowling club on Douglas Road and two cricket clubs, Hazel Grove CC and Norbury CC. The latter includes a lacrosse club and crown green bowling club, each with their own facilities. Torkington Park provides crown green bowling, tennis courts and football pitches.

Hazel Grove Football Club was founded in 1957 and play their home games at Torkington Park. The club was taken over by new management in 2014 and plays in the Manchester Saturday Morning Football League. Richmond Rovers JFC is a junior football club based opposite the high school on Jacksons Lane.

== Notable residents ==
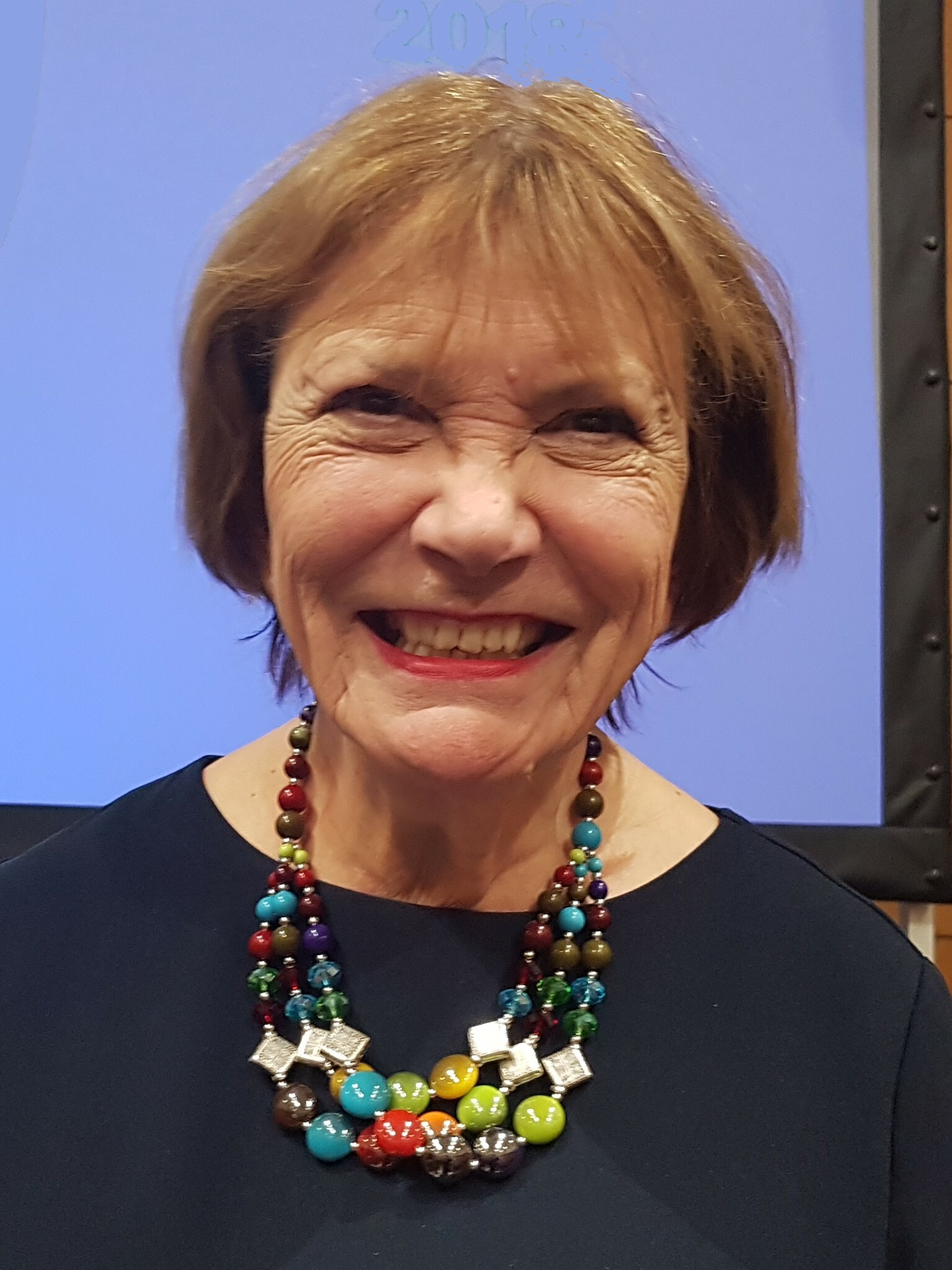
Baroness Joan Bakewell, 2018

- Edward John Thompson (1886–1946), scholar, novelist, historian and translator.
- Joan Bakewell (born 1933), journalist, TV presenter and Labour Party peer.
- Carolyn Hansson (born 1941), materials engineer.
- Peter Bowker (born 1959), playwright and television writer.
- Tim Scott (born 1971), instrumental recording artist.

=== Sport ===
- William Garbutt (1883–1964), former professional footballer and manager in Italian football.
- Johnny Johnson (1921–2003), footballer who made 294 appearances for Millwall
- Jon Willis (born 1981), professional fencer

== See also ==
- Listed buildings in Hazel Grove and Bramhall
