= Tarkington (surname) =

Tarkington is an English surname, a variant of the place name Torkington; other variants include Talkington and Turkington.

== History ==
John Tarkington Sr., his wife Prudence, their son John Jr. and wife Martha, and their son William Joshua came to America in about 1668. They settled on 250 acres (1.0 km^{2}) of land in Baltimore County, Maryland. The plantation was named "The Grove".

John Tarkington was one of the original settlers of Maryland. He began to accumulate property by getting settlers to move to a certain locality. In 1675, he transported a group into the province to inhabit Cecil County and obtained 560 acres (2.3 km^{2}) for himself.

John Tarkington had a son Samuel, who it is said was killed or kidnapped by the natives.

Booth Tarkington's ancestors migrated through Tyrrell County, North Carolina, and then on to Indiana.

Notable people with the surname include:

- Booth Tarkington (1869–1946), American novelist and dramatist
- Hiram Tarkington (1896–1996), United States Army officer
- Rockne Tarkington (1931–2015), American actor

== See also ==
- Tarkington (disambiguation)
- Tarkenton

== Sources ==
- Irwin Anderson Watson (1971). The Pioneers Were Our Ancestors (illus. ed.). Tulsa, Oklahoma. OCLC 698027427.
