= Bosden Farm =

Area of Stockport, Greater Manchester, England

Coordinates: 53°23′N 2°07′W

- Location within Greater Manchester
- Population: 3,000
- Metropolitan borough: Stockport
- Metropolitan county: Greater Manchester
- Region: North West
- Country: England
- Sovereign state: United Kingdom
- Police: Greater Manchester
- Fire: Greater Manchester
- Ambulance: North West

Bosden Farm is a suburban housing estate with a population of around 3,000 on the edge of Offerton, bordering Marple and Hazel Grove, in Stockport, Greater Manchester, England, surrounded by land used for agricultural purposes.

== History ==
The estate takes its name from Bosden, which was a civil parish between 1878 and 1900 and which also included the eastern side of Hazel Grove. Although surrounded by the ancient parish of Stockport, Bosden was a detached part of the parish of Cheadle from at least the 13th century. Cheadle parish formed part of the Macclesfield Hundred of Cheshire, and was subdivided into three townships; Bosden formed part of the Handforth township, which was sometimes also known as 'Handforth-cum-Bosden'.

From the 17th century onwards, parishes were gradually given various civil functions under the poor laws, in addition to their original ecclesiastical functions. In some cases, including Cheadle, the civil functions were exercised by each township rather than the parish as a whole. In 1866, the legal definition of 'parish' was changed to be the areas used for administering the poor laws, and so Handforth-cum-Bosden became a civil parish. Handforth-cum-Bosden parish comprised two separate areas at Bosden and Handforth, which were 5 miles (8.0 km) apart; they were each made separate civil parishes in 1878.

When elected parish and district councils were established in 1894, Bosden was given a parish council and included in the Stockport Rural District. Shortly afterwards, Stockport Borough Council began campaigning to have the various small parishes just outside its southern boundaries incorporated into the County Borough of Stockport. The five parish councils of Bramhall, Bosden, Norbury, Offerton and Torkington collectively decided that they wished to resist being brought into Stockport, and therefore petitioned Cheshire County Council to create an urban district covering the combined area of their five parishes. The county council agreed, and the parish of Bosden was therefore abolished in September 1900, with the area becoming part of the new civil parish and urban district of Hazel Grove and Bramhall.

Hazel Grove and Bramhall Urban District was abolished in 1974 to become part of the Metropolitan Borough of Stockport in Greater Manchester.

Bosden Hall Road, Bosden Fold Road and Bosden Avenue are all street names in the part of Hazel Grove which was formerly in the parish of Bosden. The Bosden name was also used for the housing estate of Bosden Farm which was built to the north-east of Hazel Grove in the second half of the 20th century.

== Schools ==
As of 2004, there is only one primary school after the closure of St. Stephen's Church of England Primary School. This is Warren Wood Primary School which was built in 1981 just a few hundred metres away from the shopping precinct on Turnstone Road. It serves as an active part of the community, providing local education to the pupils in the area and also holding public events and gatherings in the main hall and grounds.

== Sports ==
Bosden Farm Football Club was established in 2022.
