= Tarkington =

Tarkington may refer to:

- Tarkington (automobile), an American automobile
- Tarkington (surname), a surname of English origin
- Tarkington or Tarkington Prairie, Texas, an unincorporated community in Texas
  - Tarkington Independent School District, a school district serving Tarkington and surrounding communities

== See also ==
- Talkington (disambiguation)
- Torkington
