= Norbury, Greater Manchester =

Coordinates: 53°22′N 2°07′W

Norbury
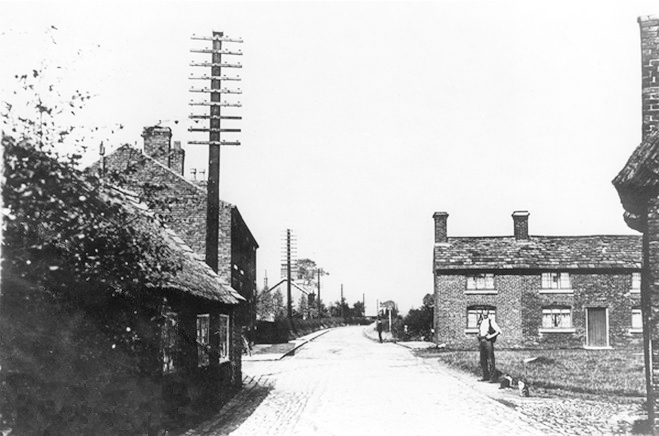
- Junction in Norbury, c. 1900

- Location within Greater Manchester
- Metropolitan borough: Stockport
- Metropolitan county: Greater Manchester
- Region: North West
- Country: England
- Sovereign state: United Kingdom
- Police: Greater Manchester
- Fire: Greater Manchester
- Ambulance: North West

Norbury was formerly a civil parish in Cheshire, England, covering the southern parts of the village of Hazel Grove. The parish was abolished in 1900 to become part of Hazel Grove and Bramhall, which was in turn abolished in 1974 to become part of the Metropolitan Borough of Stockport in Greater Manchester. The name Norbury is no longer in widespread usage for the area, although the Church of England ecclesiastical parish covering Hazel Grove is still officially called 'St Thomas, Norbury'. The Norbury name is also used for a primary school (Norbury Hall), a stream (Norbury Brook), and the 1960s Norbury Moor housing estate on the southern side of Hazel Grove.

== History ==
Norbury was historically a township in the ancient parish of Stockport, which formed part of the Macclesfield Hundred of Cheshire. From the 17th century onwards, parishes were gradually given various civil functions under the poor laws, in addition to their original ecclesiastical functions. In some cases, including Stockport, the civil functions were exercised by each township rather than the parish as a whole. In 1866, the legal definition of 'parish' was changed to be the areas used for administering the poor laws, and so Norbury became a civil parish.

Norbury was also a chapelry by the early 17th century, having a small chapel which stood on the east side of Macclesfield Road, opposite Norbury Hall. The chapel was known for being served by Nonconformist ministers in the late 17th century. By the 1830s the chapel was described as ruinous, and the building was subsequently replaced by St Thomas's Church on the edge of Hazel Grove, with the site of the old chapel reverting to fields.

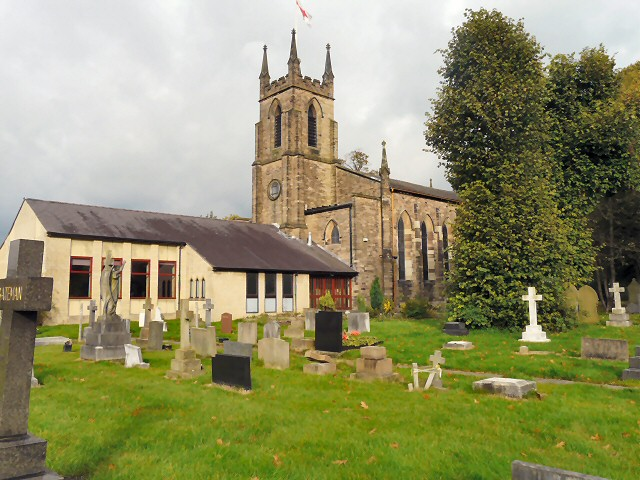
St Thomas' Church

The village of Hazel Grove straddled four townships: Bosden, Bramhall, Norbury, and Torkington. In the 1830s, it was decided to build a church, both to serve the growing village and to replace the increasingly ruinous Norbury chapel. The site chosen was on the southern edge of Hazel Grove as it then was, in Norbury township. The church, dedicated to St Thomas, was completed in 1834. In 1842 an ecclesiastical parish called 'St Thomas, Norbury' was created, which initially just covered the Norbury township. The ecclesiastical parish was enlarged in 1878 to take in Bosden and parts of Bramhall and Torkington townships, such that it then covered the whole of Hazel Grove village.

When elected parish and district councils were created in 1894, the civil parish of Norbury was given a parish council and included in the Stockport Rural District. Shortly afterwards, Stockport Borough Council began campaigning to have the various small parishes just outside its southern boundaries (most of which had formerly been townships in the parish of Stockport) incorporated into the County Borough of Stockport. The five parish councils of Bramhall, Bosden, Norbury, Offerton and Torkington collectively decided that they wished to resist being brought into Stockport, and therefore petitioned Cheshire County Council to create an urban district covering the combined area of their five parishes. The county council agreed, and the parish of Norbury was therefore abolished in September 1900, with the area becoming part of the new civil parish and urban district of Hazel Grove and Bramhall. At the 1891 census (the last before its abolition), the civil parish of Norbury had a population of 1,495. Hazel Grove and Bramhall was abolished in 1974 to become part of the Metropolitan Borough of Stockport in Greater Manchester.

The legal name of the ecclesiastical parish covering Hazel Grove remains 'St Thomas, Norbury'. The church is now known both as 'Norbury Church' and 'St Thomas, Hazel Grove'.

In the 1960s a large housing estate was built to the south of Hazel Grove called Norbury Moor.
