= Bramhall =

Village in Greater Manchester, England

Coordinates: 53.357°N 2.164°W

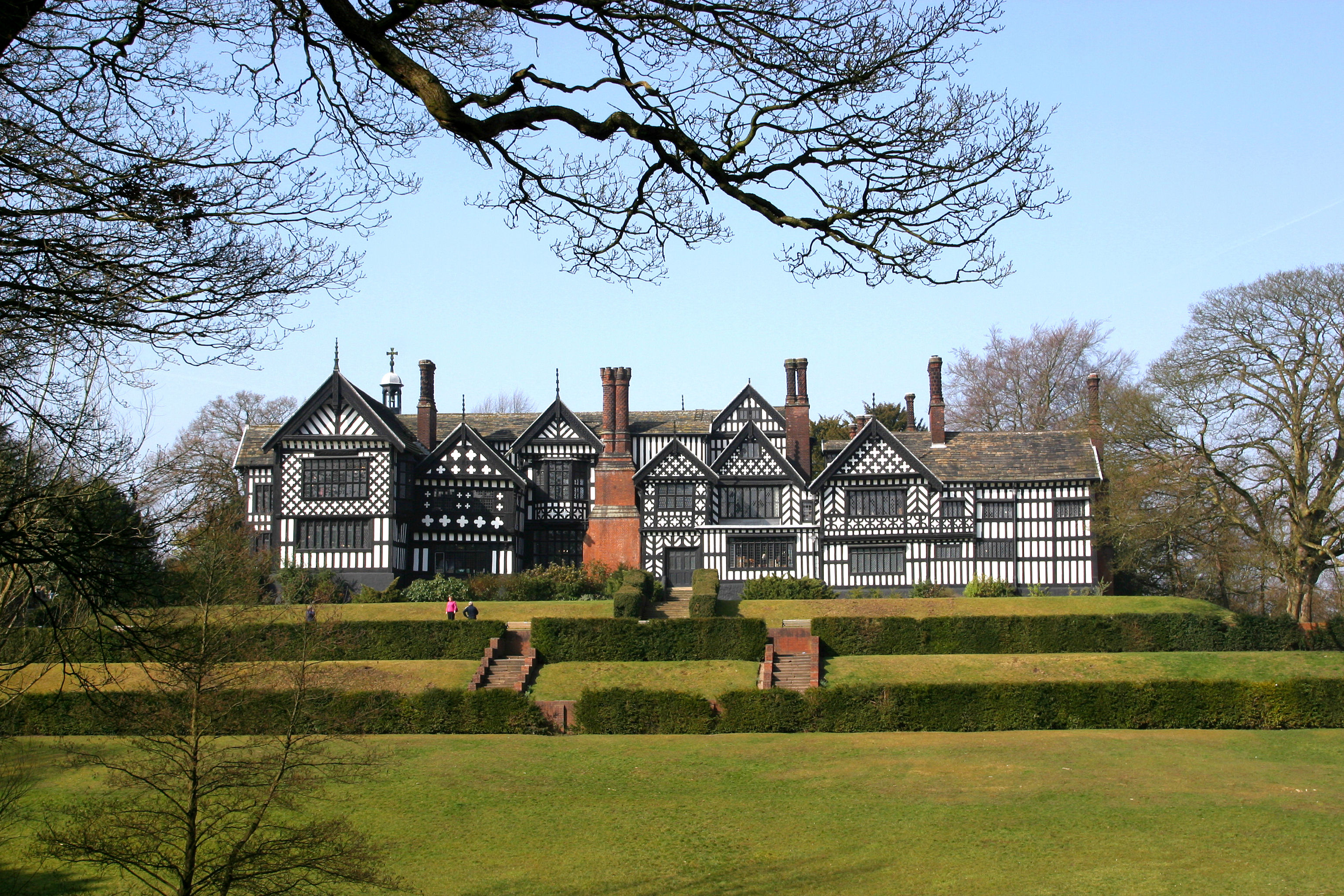
- Bramall Hall is a Tudor mansion and local landmark.

- Location within Greater Manchester
- Population: 17,195 (built-up area, 2021)
- OS grid reference: SJ890845
- Metropolitan borough: Stockport
- Metropolitan county: Greater Manchester
- Region: North West
- Country: England
- Sovereign state: United Kingdom
- Post town: STOCKPORT
- Postcode district: SK7
- Dialling code: 0161
- Police: Greater Manchester
- Fire: Greater Manchester
- Ambulance: North West
- UK Parliament: Cheadle

Bramhall is a large village in the Metropolitan Borough of Stockport, Greater Manchester, England. It was formerly a civil parish in Cheshire. At the 2021 census, the built-up area, as defined by the Office for National Statistics, had a population of 17,195.

== History ==
In 1066, the Anglo-Saxon manor of Bramall was held as separate estates by two freemen, Brun and Hakon. In 1070, William the Conqueror subdued the north-west of England and divided the land among his followers. The manor was given to Hamon de Massey, who eventually became the first Baron of Dunham Massey. The earliest reference to Bramall was recorded in the Domesday Book as "Bramale", a name derived from the Old English words brom meaning broom, both indigenous to the area, and halh meaning nook or secret place, probably by water. De Massey received the manor as wasteland, since it had been devastated in the Harrying of the North. By the time of the Domesday survey, the land was recovering and cultivated again.

== Governance ==
There is one main tier of local government covering Bramhall, at metropolitan borough level: Stockport Metropolitan Borough Council. The council is a member of the Greater Manchester Combined Authority, which is led by the directly-elected Mayor of Greater Manchester.

Bramhall is part of the parliamentary constituency of Cheadle, represented by Liberal Democrat Tom Morrison since 2024.

=== Administrative history ===
Bramhall was historically a township in the ancient parish of Stockport, which formed part of the Macclesfield Hundred of Cheshire. From the 17th century onwards, parishes were gradually given various civil functions under the poor laws, in addition to their original ecclesiastical functions. In some cases, including Stockport, the civil functions were exercised by each township rather than the parish as a whole. In 1866, the legal definition of 'parish' was changed to be the areas used for administering the poor laws and so Bramhall became a civil parish.

As well as the village of Bramhall, the township included surrounding rural areas and extended to include the south-western side of the village of Hazel Grove, which straddled four townships: Bosden, Bramhall, Norbury and Torkington.

When elected parish and district councils were created in 1894, Bramhall was given a parish council and included in the Stockport Rural District. Shortly afterwards, Stockport Borough Council began campaigning to have the various small parishes just outside its southern boundaries (most of which had formerly been townships in the parish of Stockport) incorporated into the County Borough of Stockport. The five parish councils of Bramhall, Bosden, Norbury, Offerton and Torkington collectively decided that they wished to resist being brought into Stockport; they therefore petitioned Cheshire County Council to create an urban district covering the combined area of their five parishes. The county council agreed and the parish of Bramhall was therefore abolished in September 1900, with the area becoming part of the new civil parish and urban district of Hazel Grove and Bramhall.

In 1891 (the last census before the abolition of the parish), Bramhall had a population of 3,365.

Although Hazel Grove and Bramhall Urban District included Bramhall in its name, the council was always based in Hazel Grove initially at offices on London Road; then at Torkington Lodge from 1937.

Hazel Grove and Bramhall was abolished in 1974 to become part of the Metropolitan Borough of Stockport, in Greater Manchester.

== Landmarks ==
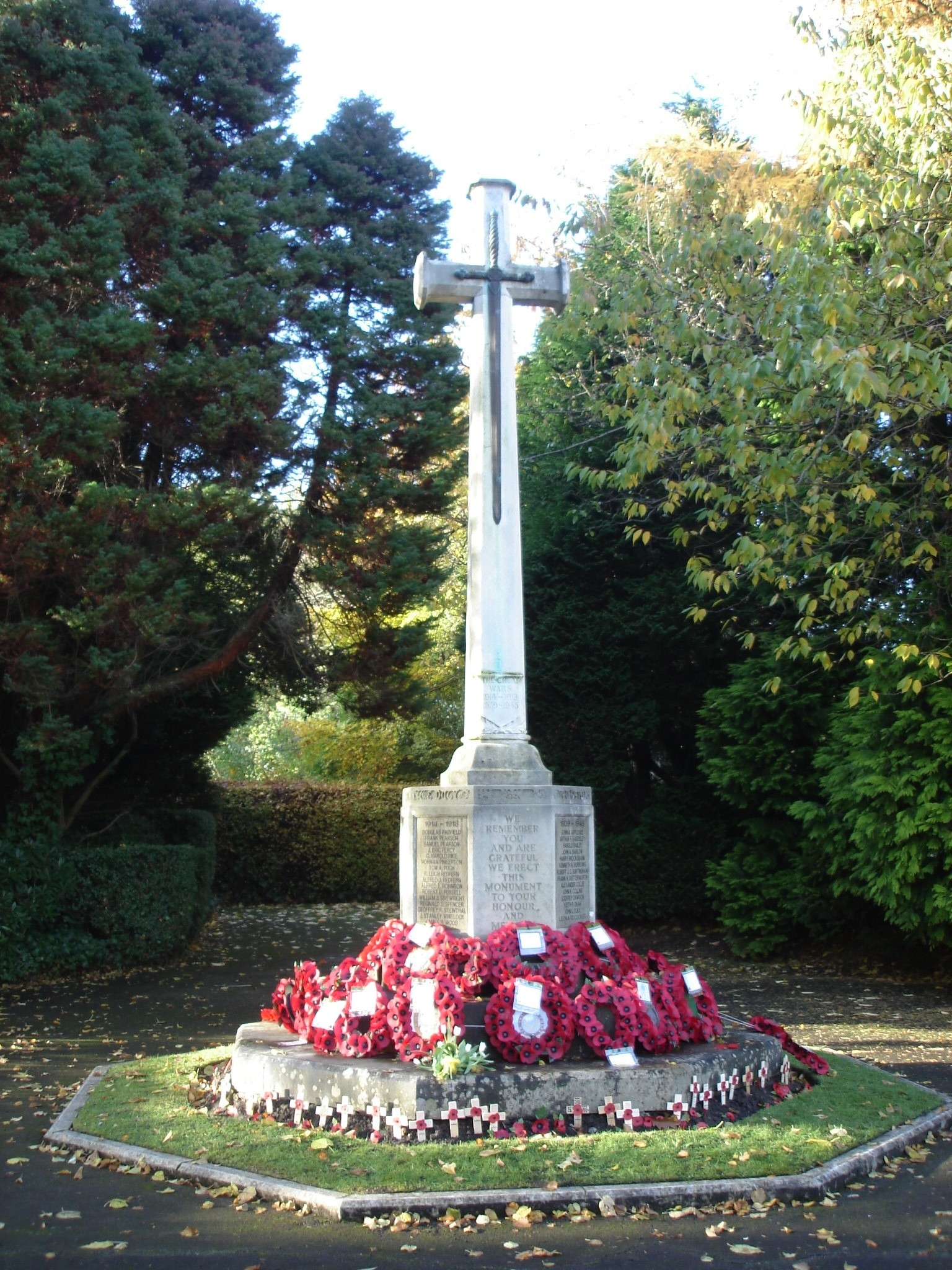
Bramhall War Memorial in 2013

Bramall Hall, set in 26 hectares (64 acres) of parkland, is an example of a 14th-century Cheshire building. In 2016, an extensive programme of restoration work was completed. The Ladybrook flows westward through the park, joining the River Mersey at Cheadle.

Bramhall War Memorial is in Mayfield Place; it was unveiled by Sir Henry de Beauvoir De Lisle on 18 December 1921. It commemorates the 89 men of Bramhall who fell in the two world wars.

== Churches ==
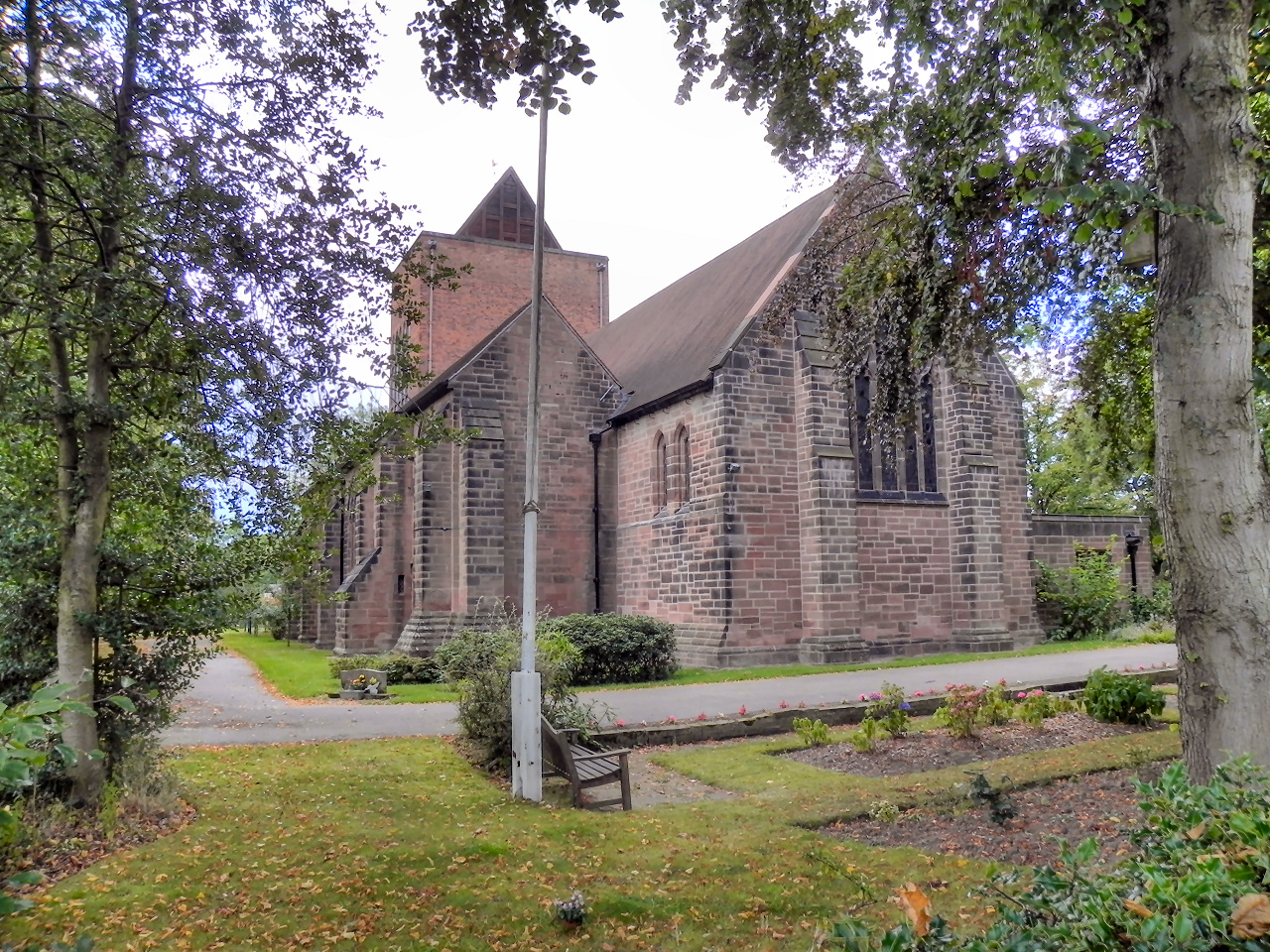
St Michael and All Angels' Church, 2011

The Church of England parish church of St Michael and All Angels, in Robins Lane, was consecrated in 1911 when Bramhall ecclesiastical parish was created, although the building was not completed until 1963. It replaced an earlier mission church opened in 1890.

Other churches in Bramhall include the Methodist Church, in the centre of the village; the United Reformed Church, located on Bramhall Lane South; the Baptist Church, on Woodford Road; the Roman Catholic Church of St. Vincent de Paul, on Handley Road; and Ford's Lane Evangelical Church.

== Transport ==
Bramhall railway station lies on the Stafford-Manchester line, a spur of the West Coast Main Line. Northern Trains operates an hourly stopping service in each direction between Manchester Piccadilly, Stockport, Macclesfield and Stoke-on-Trent; there is a much reduced service on Sundays.

Stagecoach Manchester operates the following local bus routes, under the Bee Network brand:

- 42B: between Woodford, Cheadle Hulme, East Didsbury and Manchester Piccadilly Gardens
- 377: between Woodford and Stockport
- 378/9 Heald Green to Stockport circular
- 378A: Grove Lane (Note: On the edge of Cheadle Hulme) to Stockport circular.

== Housing ==
Bramhall has a high number of Edwardian and some Victorian houses, particularly around the village centre and along the main roads (and side roads) leading towards Bramhall Park, Cheadle Hulme and Woodford. In addition, there are several older listed buildings in the area. These contribute to the historic character of the village. There are also several 1930s-1950s houses in the area.

The 1960s and early 1970s saw a growth in Bramhall's housing stock. New developments included the Parkside and New House Farm areas in the north of the suburb, nearer to the park. Closer to the village centre lies the Dairyground estate and the Little Australia estate, so called as many roads are named after locations in Australia. Newer infill housing of a similar period exists in pockets around Bramhall, as well as some more recent additions.

== Education ==
The suburb has five primary schools: Ladybrook, Moss Hey, Nevill Road, Pownall Green and Queensgate.

Bramhall High School is the local secondary school.

== Sport and recreation ==
Bramhall has a cricket club and there are three lawn tennis clubs: Bramhall Queensgate, to the north; Bramhall Lane, close to the village; and Bramhall Park, close to the park.

There are also two golf clubs in Bramhall, each with 18-hole courses: Bramhall Golf Club and Bramall Park Golf Club.

Stockport RUFC in Bramhall has been host to Headlander Festival. There is a recreation centre linked with Bramhall High School with indoor and outdoor facilities.

== Notable people ==
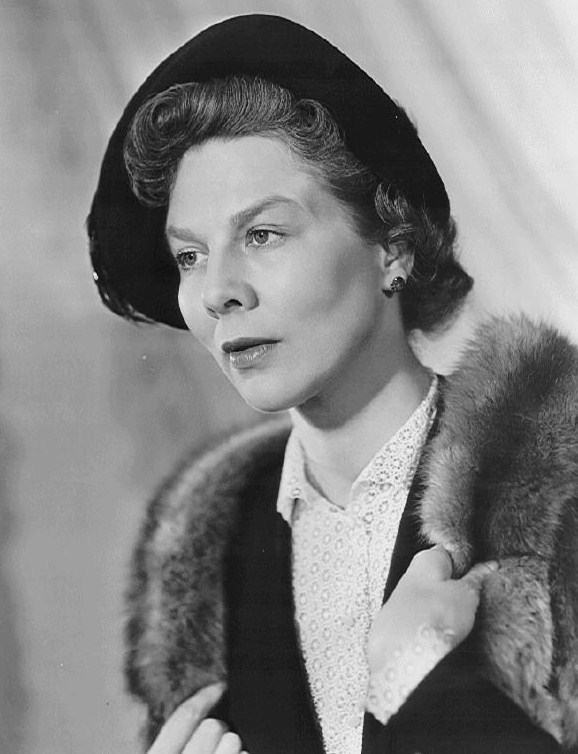
Dame Wendy Hiller, 1953

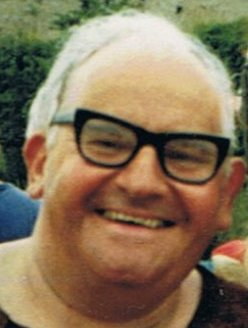
Ronnie Barker, 1980s

Notable local residents have included:

- Dame Wendy Hiller (1912–2003), an English film and stage actress, born in Bramhall
- John Buxton (1912–1989), a scholar, university teacher, poet and an ornithologist
- Peter Butterworth (1915–1979), comedy actor and comedian, featured in the Carry On series
- Cicely Popplewell (1920–1995), software engineer, worked with Alan Turing on the Manchester Mark 1 computer
- Ronnie Barker (1929–2005), actor and comedian, worked in a local repertory company early in his career.
- Peter Barkworth (1929–2006), actor, lived locally
- David Ellis (1933–2023), an English composer, arranger and music producer at the BBC; lived locally
- Anne Reid (born 1935), stage, film and TV actress, played Valerie Barlow in Coronation Street, lived locally
- Martin Fry (born 1958), lead singer of the band ABC
- Simon Thompson (born 1959), investment banker and business executive, chairman of Rio Tinto
- Mark Hadfield (born 1959), actor, born in Bramhall
- Yvette Fielding (born 1968), actress and Blue Peter presenter, grew up locally
- Jason Manford (born 1981), comedian, singer, TV presenter, radio presenter and actor
- Sarah Harding (1981–2021), singer in the girl group Girls Aloud
- Sacha Dhawan (born 1984), actor, born in Bramhall
- Ryan Thomas (born 1984), former actor, played Jason Grimshaw on Coronation Street
- Lauren Drummond (born 1987), actress, attended Bramhall High School
- Aimee Lou Wood (born 1994), actress, grew up locally.

=== Sport ===
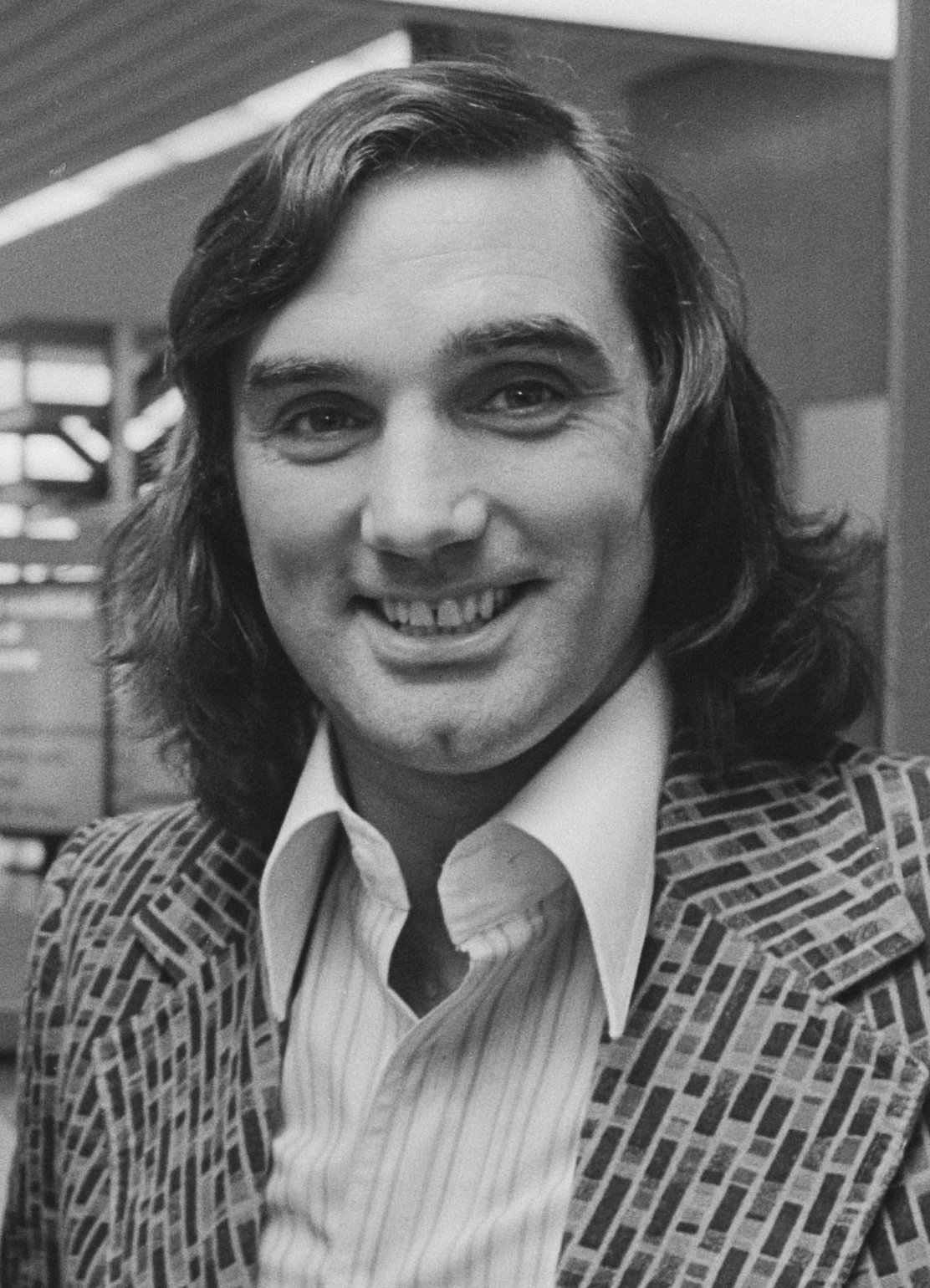
George Best, 1976

- Bert Trautmann (1923–2013), German goalkeeper, played 508 games for Manchester City
- George Best (1946–2005), footballer, played 616 games including 361 for Manchester United
- Keith Fielding (born 1949), former England and Great Britain international rugby player
- Steve Bruce (born 1960), football manager and former Manchester United footballer, lived off Robins Lane
- Peter Schmeichel (born 1963), former Manchester United footballer, played 648 league games and 129 for Denmark
- Paul Ince (born 1967), former Manchester United footballer, played 609 league games and 53 for England
- Uwe Rosler (born 1968), former Manchester City footballer, played 419 games
- Ole Gunnar Solskjær (born 1973), former Manchester United footballer and manager, played 386 league games and 67 for Norway, lived in Bramhall whilst a player
- Kasper Schmeichel (born 1986), former Leicester City and Manchester City footballer, played over 600 league games and 114 for Denmark
- Phil Foden (born 2000), footballer, has played over 200 league games for Manchester City and 45 for England.

== See also ==
- Listed buildings in Hazel Grove and Bramhall
- Ladybrook Valley
