= Headlander Festival =

- Genre: Rock, Blues, Folk, Ska, Bluegrass
- Dates: Mid-June
- Locations: Headlands Road, Bramhall, Stockport, England
- Years active: 2013–2015
- Website: www.headlanderfestival.co.uk

Headlander Festival was a small UK family-friendly festival held on the ground of Stockport RUFC in Bramhall, with the first two-day event being held from 21 June to 22 June 2013. The two-day event attracted around 6,000 music fans each year.

The festival was designed to be accessible to families with children of all ages and featured three stages for live music, a trade village, foods from around the world and music workshops.

== 2013 ==
Acts who appeared at the first Headlander Festival included; A Few Good Men, The Rainband, The Beavers, Kill For Company, The Ordinary, Reachback and Manchester Ska Foundation.

== 2014 ==
Toploader headlined the 2014 festival which also saw appearances from The Mend, Stooshe, Kazo, The Feud, Jeramiah Ferrari, The High Nines, Daisy Day, A Few Good Men and Swampgrass.

== 2015 ==
Acts appearing over 20 and 21 June 2015 included:

- Roachford
- From The Jam
- Jeramiah Ferrari
- My Darling Clementine
- Philip Henry & Hannah Martin
- Son Of Dave
- Clive Gregson
- Hat Fitz and Cara
- Chickenbone John
- Alex McKnow
- Kazo
- James Michael
- Isembard's Wheel
- Dave Sharp
- Doug Perkins and The Spectaculars
- Tree House Fire!
- The Hummingbirds
- Route 66
- The Hayes Sisters
- Lucky T Jackson
