= Torkington =

Area of Hazel Grove, Greater Manchester, England

Coordinates: 53.3785°N 2.1059°W

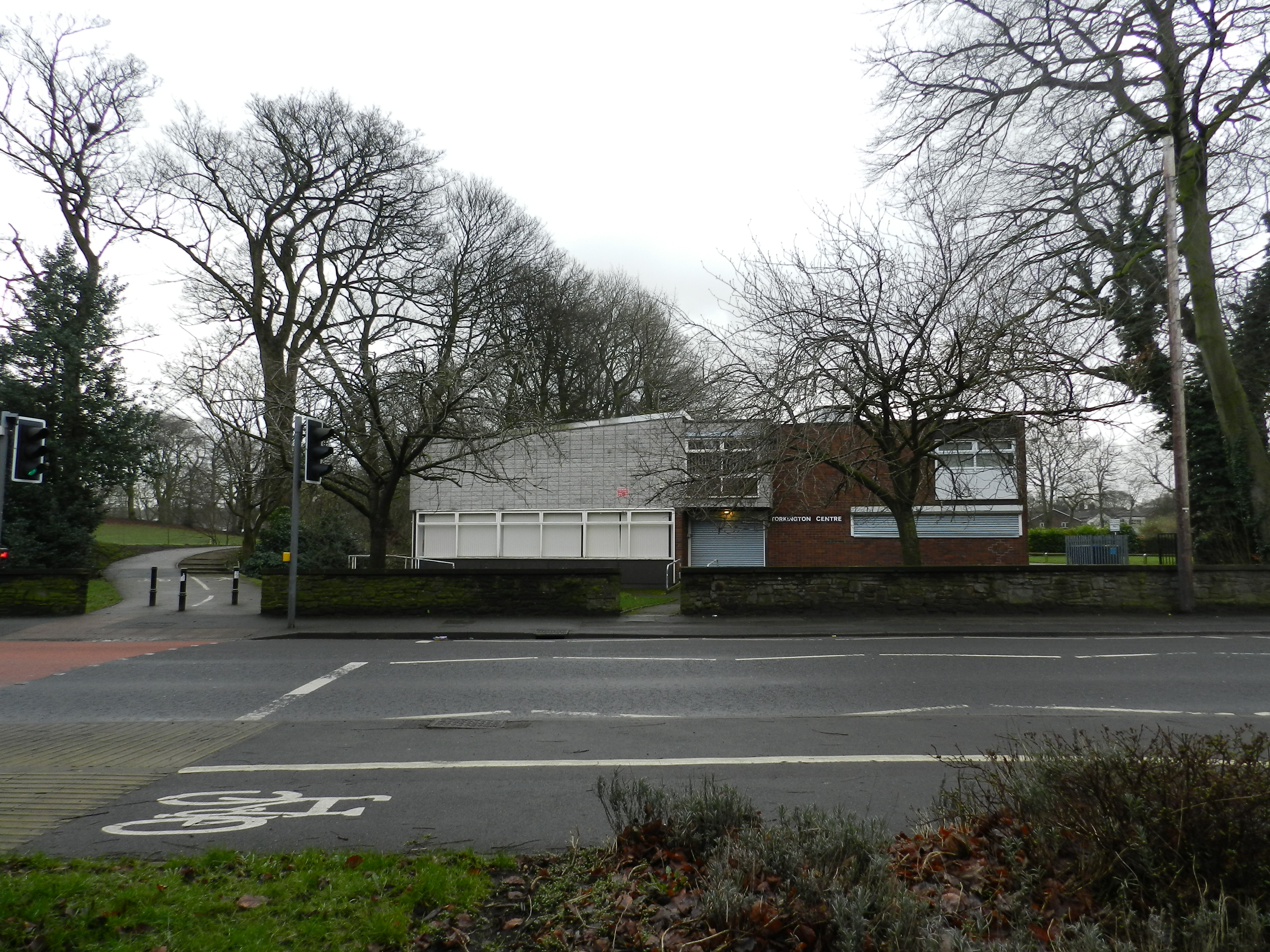
- The Torkington Centre

- Location within Greater Manchester
- Metropolitan borough: Stockport
- Metropolitan county: Greater Manchester
- Region: North West
- Country: England
- Sovereign state: United Kingdom
- Police: Greater Manchester
- Fire: Greater Manchester
- Ambulance: North West

Torkington is an area of Hazel Grove in the Metropolitan Borough of Stockport, Greater Manchester, England. It was formerly a civil parish in Cheshire, covering the small hamlet of Torkington and eastern parts of the village of Hazel Grove. The parish was abolished in 1900 to become part of Hazel Grove and Bramhall, which was in turn abolished in 1974 to become part of the metropolitan borough of Stockport. Torkington Park is one of the main public open spaces in Hazel Grove.

== History ==
Torkington was historically a township in the ancient parish of Stockport, which formed part of the Macclesfield Hundred of Cheshire. From the 17th century onwards, parishes were gradually given various civil functions under the poor laws, in addition to their original ecclesiastical functions. In some cases, including Stockport, the civil functions were exercised by each township rather than the parish as a whole. In 1866, the legal definition of 'parish' was changed to be the areas used for administering the poor laws, and so Torkington became a civil parish.

The village of Hazel Grove straddled four townships: Bosden, Bramhall, Norbury, and Torkington. When elected parish and district councils were created in 1894, Torkington was given a parish council and included in the Stockport Rural District. Shortly afterwards, Stockport Borough Council began campaigning to have the various small parishes just outside its southern boundaries (most of which had formerly been townships in the parish of Stockport) incorporated into the County Borough of Stockport. The five parish councils of Bramhall, Bosden, Norbury, Offerton and Torkington collectively decided that they wished to resist being brought into Stockport, and therefore petitioned Cheshire County Council to create an urban district covering the combined area of their five parishes. The county council agreed, and the parish of Torkington was therefore abolished in September 1900, with the area becoming part of the new civil parish and urban district of Hazel Grove and Bramhall.

In 1891 (the last census before the abolition of the parish), Torkington had a population of 294.

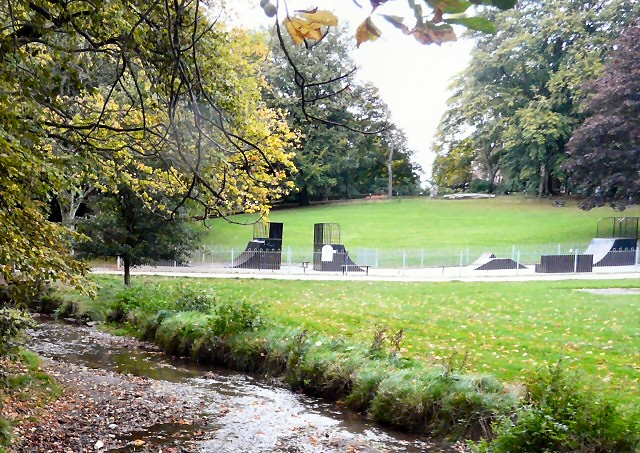
Torkington Park

Hazel Grove and Bramhall Urban District Council bought Torkington Lodge in 1935. The early 19th century main house was converted into the council's headquarters, with the first council meeting being held there in January 1937, and its grounds were turned into a public park.

Hazel Grove and Bramhall was abolished in 1974 to become part of the Metropolitan Borough of Stockport in Greater Manchester.

Torkington today is classed as part of the Hazel Grove built up area by the Office for National Statistics. Torkington is not a postal locality; the area comes under the Hazel Grove postal locality within the Stockport post town. Away from the built up area of Hazel Grove, eastern parts of the former Torkington parish remain rural, forming part of the North West Green Belt.

== See also ==
- Tarkington
