= Offerton, Greater Manchester =

Suburb of Stockport, in Greater Manchester, England

Coordinates: 53.3939°N 2.1257°W

Offerton
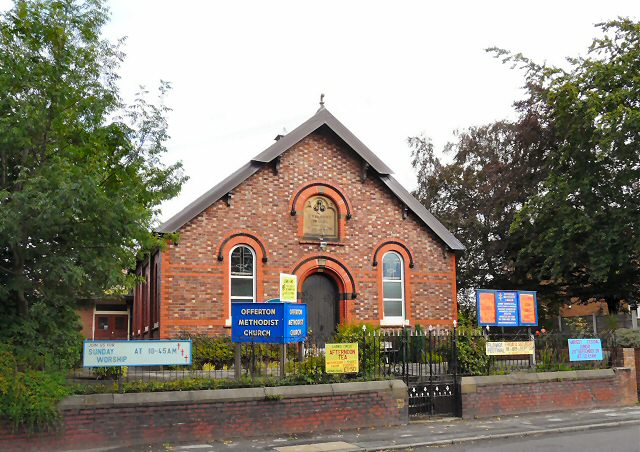
- Offerton Methodist Church in 2009

- Location within Greater Manchester
- OS grid reference: SJ916885
- Metropolitan borough: Metropolitan Borough of Stockport
- Metropolitan county: Greater Manchester
- Region: North West
- Country: England
- Sovereign state: United Kingdom
- Post town: STOCKPORT
- Postcode district: SK2
- Dialling code: 0161
- Police: Greater Manchester
- Fire: Greater Manchester
- Ambulance: North West
- UK Parliament: Hazel Grove

Offerton is a suburb of Stockport, in Greater Manchester, England. It lies within the historic county boundaries of Cheshire and became part of Greater Manchester in 1974.

== History ==
The suburb was historically a township in the ancient parish of Stockport, which formed part of the Macclesfield Hundred of Cheshire. From the 17th century onwards, parishes were gradually given various civil functions under the poor laws, in addition to their original ecclesiastical functions; in some cases, including Stockport, these were exercised by each township rather than the parish as a whole.

In 1866, the legal definition of 'parish' was changed to be the areas used for administering the poor laws, and so Offerton became a civil parish.

When elected parish and district councils were created in 1894, Offerton was given a parish council and included in the Stockport Rural District. Shortly afterwards, Stockport Borough Council began campaigning to have the various small parishes just outside its southern boundaries (most of which had formerly been townships in the parish of Stockport) incorporated into the County Borough of Stockport. The five parish councils of Bramhall, Bosden, Norbury, Offerton and Torkington collectively decided that they wished to resist being brought into Stockport, and therefore petitioned Cheshire County Council to create an urban district covering the combined area of their five parishes. The county council agreed, and the parish of Offerton was therefore abolished in September 1900, with the area becoming part of the new civil parish and urban district of Hazel Grove and Bramhall.

Offerton remained relatively small at that time, comprising a scattered hamlet along Marple Road, later numbered as the A626, through Offerton Green. In 1891, the last census before the abolition of the parish, Offerton had a population of 372.

Suburban development was subsequently built across much of the area of the former Offerton township, especially in the second half of the 20th century, notably at the Offerton Park estate and parts of the neighbouring Bosden Farm estate.

The parish of Hazel Grove and Bramhall was abolished in 1974 to become part of the Metropolitan Borough of Stockport, in Greater Manchester.

A new civil parish called Offerton Estate was created in 2002 and subsequently renamed Offerton Park in 2006. It covered one of the area's 1960s housing estates, rather than the whole area known as Offerton. The parish was abolished in 2011.

Offerton today is classed as part of the Stockport built-up area by the Office for National Statistics.

== Amenities ==
Offerton has a range of amenities, including several primary schools, Castle Hill High School (a community special school) and a community centre. The area also has a number of parks and green spaces, including Torkington and Woodbank parks.

== Transport ==
Offerton is well-connected to the rest of the region, with easy access to the M60 motorway at junctions 25 and 26.

Between them, Stagecoach Manchester and Diamond Bus North West operate bus routes through the suburb.
