= Johnny Johnson (footballer) =

English footballer

- Johnson while with Millwall in 1954.

Personal information
- Full name: John Johnson
- Date of birth: 11 December 1921
- Place of birth: Hazel Grove, England
- Date of death: October 2003 (aged 81)
- Place of death: Kent, England
- Position: Outside right

Senior career*
Years	Team	Apps	(Gls)
1941–1946	Stockport County	0	(0)
1946–1955	Millwall	294	(42)
1955–1956	Tonbridge		
1955–1957	Millwall	15	(4)
1957	Margate	15	(3)
1957	Canterbury City		
1957–1959	Dover		
- * Club domestic league appearances and goals

John Johnson (11 December 1921 – October 2003) was an English professional footballer who made over 290 appearances in the Football League for Millwall as an outside right. He is a member of the club's Hall of Fame.

== Career statistics ==
Appearances and goals by club, season and competition
Club	Season	League			FA Cup		Total	
Club	Season	Division	Apps	Goals	Apps	Goals	Apps	Goals
Stockport County	1945–46	—			2	0	2	0
Millwall	1946–47	Second Division	42	10	1	0	43	10
Millwall	1947–48	Second Division	39	4	1	0	40	4
Millwall	1948–49	Third Division South	32	2	2	0	34	2
Millwall	1949–50	Third Division South	35	3	1	0	36	3
Millwall	1950–51	Third Division South	43	7	5	2	48	9
Millwall	1951–52	Third Division South	35	9	3	0	38	9
Millwall	1952–53	Third Division South	25	5	1	0	26	5
Millwall	1953–54	Third Division South	21	1	3	0	24	1
Millwall	1954–55	Third Division South	22	3	0	0	22	3
Millwall	Total		279	38	17	2	296	40
Millwall	1955–56	Third Division South	14	4	—		14	4
Millwall	1956–57	Third Division South	1	0	0	0	1	0
Millwall	Total		294	42	17	2	311	44
Margate	1956–57	Kent League First Division	15	3	—		15	3
Career total			309	45	19	2	328	47

== Honours ==
- Millwall Hall of Fame
