= 1901 Stockport Borough Council election =

Local election in Stockport

- 1 November 1901

34 of 64 seats on Stockport County Borough Council 33 seats needed for a majority
	First party	Second party
Party	Liberal	Conservative
Seats before	39	17
Seats won	24	10
Seats after	50	14
Seat change	▲9	▼3
Popular vote	10,832	9,124
Percentage	53.1%	44.7%
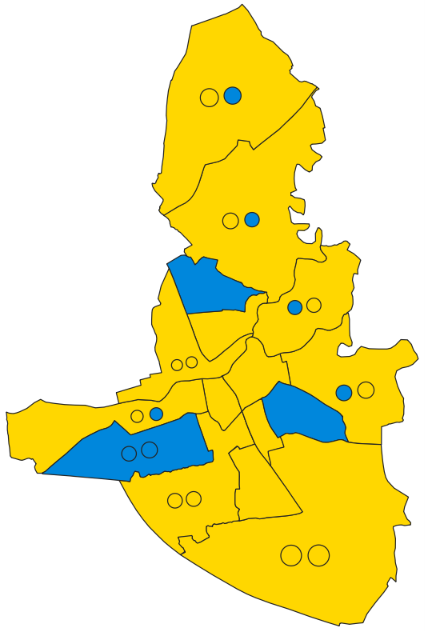
- Map of results of 1901 election
Leader of the Council before election
Liberal
Leader of the Council after election
Liberal

Elections to Stockport Borough Council were held on Friday, 1 November 1901. One third of the councillors seats were up for election, with each successful candidate to serve a three-year term of office. Owing to the extension of the borough's boundaries, two new wards (Reddish North and Reddish South) and an additional seven wards affected by the boundary changes elected all of their councillors.

The Liberal Party retained overall control of the council.

== Election result ==
Party	Votes	Seats			Full Council	
Liberal Party	10,832 (53.1%)	24 (70.6%)	24 / 34	▲9	50 (78.1%)	50 / 64
Conservative Party	9,124 (44.7%)	10 (29.4%)	10 / 34	▼3	14 (21.9%)	14 / 64
Labour Party	381 (1.9%)	0 (0.0%)	0 / 34	Steady	0 (0.0%)	0 / 64
Independent	65 (0.3%)	0 (0.0%)	0 / 34	Steady	0 (0.0%)	0 / 64

=== Full council ===
↓
50	14

=== Aldermen ===
↓
16

=== Councillors ===
↓
34	14

== Ward results ==
=== Cale Green ===
Cale Green
Party	Candidate	Votes	%	±%
Liberal	T. Ellis*	uncontested		
Liberal hold		Swing		

=== Edgeley ===
Edgeley (3 vacancies)
Party	Candidate	Votes	%	±%
Conservative	C. Sharples*	479	57.5	
Conservative	J. Broadhurst*	475	57.0	
Conservative	W. Mackenzie	470	56.4	
Labour	G. Linfoot	381	45.7	
Liberal	T. Roscoe	334	40.1	
Majority		154	10.7	
Turnout		833		
Conservative hold		Swing		
Conservative hold		Swing		
Conservative hold		Swing		

=== Heaton Lane ===
Heaton Lane (3 vacancies)
Party	Candidate	Votes	%	±%
Liberal	G. Leigh*	604	75.3	
Liberal	J. Richardson	548	68.3	
Liberal	J. Aldred*	528	65.8	
Conservative	T. Johnson	316	39.4	
Conservative	W. H. Pickburn	300	37.4	
Conservative	R. Livesley	119	14.8	
Majority		212	26.4	
Turnout		802		
Liberal hold		Swing		
Liberal gain from Conservative		Swing		
Liberal hold		Swing		

=== Heaviley ===
Heaviley (3 vacancies)
Party	Candidate	Votes	%	±%
Liberal	W. Grundy*	487	61.1	
Liberal	T. Traynor*	465	58.3	
Liberal	W. H. Robinson*	450	56.5	
Conservative	R. W. Johnson	378	47.4	
Conservative	J. Hart	330	41.4	
Conservative	S. Harrison	281	35.3	
Majority		72	9.1	
Turnout		797		
Liberal hold		Swing		
Liberal hold		Swing		
Liberal hold		Swing		

=== Hempshaw Lane ===
Hempshaw Lane
Party	Candidate	Votes	%	±%
Conservative	J. Kirk*	uncontested		
Conservative hold		Swing		

=== Hollywood ===
Hollywood (3 vacancies)
Party	Candidate	Votes	%	±%
Liberal	T. Allcock	uncontested		
Liberal	T. Allcock	uncontested		
Conservative	R. Kidd	uncontested		
Liberal hold		Swing		
Liberal hold		Swing		
Conservative gain from Liberal		Swing		

=== Lancashire Hill ===
Lancashire Hill
Party	Candidate	Votes	%	±%
Conservative	H. G. Smeeth*	368	61.1	
Conservative	J. Wagstaff	234	38.9	
Majority		134	22.2	
Turnout		602		
Conservative hold		Swing		

=== Old Road ===
Old Road
Party	Candidate	Votes	%	±%
Liberal	G. Massey	uncontested		
Liberal gain from Conservative		Swing		

=== Portwood ===
Portwood (3 vacancies)
Party	Candidate	Votes	%	±%
Liberal	W. Thomas	737	66.5	
Conservative	G. Burrows*	699	63.0	
Liberal	J. Whalley	521	47.0	
Conservative	W. Hewitt	491	44.3	
Conservative	G. Horsfall	443	39.9	
Liberal	E. Ball	436	39.3	
Majority		30	2.7	
Turnout		1,109		
Liberal hold		Swing		
Conservative hold		Swing		
Liberal gain from Conservative		Swing		

=== Reddish North ===
Reddish North (3 vacancies)
Party	Candidate	Votes	%	±%
Liberal	J. Lloyd	485	69.8	
Liberal	W. H. Hollis	438	63.0	
Conservative	M. McGregor	322	46.3	
Conservative	J. Hainsworth	196	24.3	
Conservative	J. Johnson	181	26.0	
Majority		126	18.1	
Turnout		695		
Liberal win (new seat)				
Liberal win (new seat)				
Conservative win (new seat)				

=== Reddish South ===
Reddish South (3 vacancies)
Party	Candidate	Votes	%	±%
Liberal	F. Rawlings	299	58.9	
Liberal	J. Potter	246	48.4	
Conservative	F. H. Walker	230	45.3	
Liberal	H. P. Greg	209	41.1	
Conservative	J. Beardsell	124	24.4	
Conservative	H. Potter	123	24.2	
Majority		21	4.2	
Turnout		508		
Liberal win (new seat)				
Liberal win (new seat)				
Conservative win (new seat)				

=== St. Mary's ===
St. Mary's
Party	Candidate	Votes	%	±%
Liberal	W. G. Ward*	370	85.1	
Independent	J. Wagstaff	65	14.9	
Majority		305	70.2	
Turnout		435		
Liberal hold		Swing		

=== St. Thomas' ===
St. Thomas'
Party	Candidate	Votes	%	±%
Liberal	W. Wood*	516	88.2	
Conservative	J. Handforth	69	11.8	
Majority		447	76.4	
Turnout		585		
Liberal hold		Swing		

=== Shaw Heath ===
Shaw Heath (3 vacancies)
Party	Candidate	Votes	%	±%
Liberal	J. Barrodale	614	62.7	
Liberal	R. Johnson	569	58.1	
Liberal	A. Glithero	524	53.5	
Conservative	W. H. Gradwell*	451	46.0	
Conservative	J. Hargreaves	432	44.1	
Conservative	J. A. Branson	350	35.7	
Majority		73	7.4	
Turnout		980		
Liberal gain from Conservative		Swing		
Liberal gain from Conservative		Swing		
Liberal gain from Conservative		Swing		

=== Spring Bank ===
Spring Bank
Party	Candidate	Votes	%	±%
Liberal	T. Allcock	uncontested		
Liberal hold		Swing		

=== Vernon ===
Vernon (3 vacancies)
Party	Candidate	Votes	%	±%
Liberal	J. Lomas*	539	59.6	
Conservative	J. Needham	485	53.6	
Liberal	R. H. Rodgers*	475	52.5	
Liberal	J. B. Oldham	438	48.4	
Conservative	T. Forster	400	44.2	
Conservative	A. G. Wilkinson	378	41.8	
Majority		37	4.1	
Turnout		905		
Liberal hold		Swing		
Conservative hold		Swing		
Liberal hold		Swing		
