= Hazel Grove and Bramhall Urban District =

Former local government area in the UK

Coordinates: 53.367°N 2.140°W

Hazel Grove and Bramhall
- Hazel Grove and Bramhall UD within Cheshire in 1970
- Area
  - 1911: 5,447
  - 1961: 5,990
- Population
  - 1901: 7,934
  - 1971: 39,647
- History
  - Created: 1900
  - Abolished: 1974
  - Succeeded by: Metropolitan Borough of Stockport
- Status: Urban district, Civil parish

Hazel Grove and Bramhall was an urban district in Cheshire, England, from 1900 to 1974. It was abolished in 1974 and the area became part of the Metropolitan Borough of Stockport in Greater Manchester.

== History ==
The Hazel Grove and Bramhall Urban District was created in 1900, covering the combined area of five former civil parishes, which were abolished at the same time, with the new urban district comprising a single civil parish also called Hazel Grove and Bramhall:

- Bosden
- Bramhall
- Norbury
- Offerton
- Torkington

Bramhall, Norbury, Offerton and Torkington had each historically been townships within the ancient parish of Stockport. Such townships were also classed as civil parishes from 1866. Bosden had been a detached part of the parish of Cheadle, and had been made a separate civil parish in 1878. The village of Hazel Grove was the largest settlement in the area, with its urban area straddling the boundaries of Bosden, Bramhall, Norbury and Torkington.

When elected parish and district councils were established in 1894, the five parishes were each given a parish council and included in the Stockport Rural District. Shortly afterwards, Stockport Borough Council began campaigning to have the various small parishes just outside its southern boundaries incorporated into the County Borough of Stockport. The five parish councils collectively decided that they wished to resist being brought into Stockport, and therefore petitioned Cheshire County Council to create an urban district covering the combined area of their five parishes. The county council agreed, and the five parishes were therefore abolished in September 1900, with the area becoming part a new civil parish and urban district called Hazel Grove and Bramhall.

The urban district council based itself in Hazel Grove, initially at offices on London Road. In 1935, the urban district council bought Torkington Lodge, opening the grounds to the public as Torkington Park and converting the main house into its headquarters, with the council's first meeting there being in January 1937.

In 1936, 903 acres (3.65 km^{2}) were transferred to the County Borough of Stockport and 16 acres (65,000 m^{2}) to Marple Urban District. In 1939 the former area of the Woodford civil parish was gained.

Hazel Grove and Bramhall Urban District was abolished in 1974 to become part of the Metropolitan Borough of Stockport in Greater Manchester.
