= Carolyn Hansson =

British academic

Carolyn Hansson CM FRSC
- Born: Carolyn Russell; March 15, 1941 (age 85); Hazel Grove, Cheshire, England
- Occupation: Metallurgist

Academic background
- Education: B.Sc., Ph.D., physical metallurgy, Imperial College London
- Thesis: Lattice parameters and superconducting properties of alloys based on lead and idium (1966)

Carolyn M. Hansson CM FRSC (nee Russell; March 15, 1941) is a Canadian materials engineer. She was the first female student to attend the Royal School of Mines at Imperial College, London, and the first woman to graduate with a PhD in metallurgy from there. Hansson was honoured for pioneering a monitoring system for evaluating the integrity of concrete structures.

== Early life and education ==
Hansson was born on March 15, 1941, in Hazel Grove, Cheshire, England. Growing up, she attended an all-girls school in England and applied for metallurgy at Imperial College. Upon being accepted, she was the first female student to attend the Royal School of Mines at Imperial College, London, and the first woman to graduate with a PhD in metallurgy from there. She was also only one of two women in the United Kingdom with a PhD in metallurgy.

== Career ==
In 1976, Hansson joined AT&T Bell Labs where she stayed four years before spending the following nine as a research scientist, and eventually as head of the Research Department, at the Danish Corrosion Centre. When her husband was extended a position in Maryland, Hansson accepted an appointment within the Martin Marietta’s Institute for Advanced Studies. She was awarded a Guggenheim Fellowship in 1977 for research on physical metallurgy. doing these studies at the University of Cambridge. She was awarded the 1980 Society of Women Engineers Achievement Award.

In 1990, she became a professor and head of the Materials and Metallurgical Engineering Department at Queen's University and then joined the University of Waterloo in 1996 as Vice President of University Research. The following year, she was elected a Fellow of The Minerals, Metals & Materials Society. Hansson was eventually replaced as VP by Paul Guild in 2001 after a five year term.

Hansson's research focus is on the corrosion of steel inside concrete. She has identified techniques for measuring the amount of corrosion and also studies rust-resistant reinforcing materials. Hansson has worked as a consultant to the Ministry of Transportation Ontario and Alberta Transportation in corrosion monitoring of bridge structures. In 2005, Hansson resigned from Hydrogenics Corporation upon their acquisition of Stuart Energy. A few years later, she was elected a Fellow of the Royal Society of Canada for her contributions in the basic science of corrosion and metallurgical processes and applied engineering. Hansson also received the 2009 Acta Materialia, Inc. Materials & Society Award.

In 2014, she was appointed Executive Secretary and Cooperating Society Governor of Acta Materialia Inc. The next year, Hansson was appointed a member of the Order of Canada for "pioneering a monitoring system for evaluating the integrity of concrete structures." She has also been appointed a Fellow of the Danish Academy of Technical Sciences, the UK Institution of Materials, Minerals and Mining, and the American Concrete Institute. Two years later, she joined the Board of Directors at Electrovaya Inc. During the year, she was appointed head of Electrovaya's Disclosure Committee after it was fined $250 thousand by the Ontario Securities Commission.

== Personal life ==
As of 1980, she lived in Murray Hill, New Jersey.
