= Simon Thompson (businessman) =

- Born: 16 June 1959 (age 66); Bramhall, England
- Education: Manchester Grammar School
- Alma mater: University College, Oxford King's College London
- Occupation: Investment banker
- Board member of: Met Office

Simon Thompson (born 16 June 1959) is a British investment banker and business executive. He is the current chairman of the Met Office and was the former chairman of Tarmac Group, Tullow Oil, 3i and Rio Tinto.

== Early life and education ==
Simon Thompson was born on 16 June 1959 in Bramhall. He was educated at the Manchester Grammar School. He graduated from University College, Oxford, where he earned a bachelor's degree in geology in 1985. He was awarded a PhD in history by King's College London in 2018.

== Career ==
Thompson worked for Lloyds Bank lnternational from 1981 to 1985, N M Rothschild & Sons from 1985 to 1994, and S. G. Warburg & Co. from 1994 to 1995. He joined Minorco, a mining company, in 1995, as its head of project finance until 1997, and as the head of its Brazilian subsidiary until 1999, when it merged with Anglo American plc. He subsequently worked for Anglo American plc, serving as the chief executive officer of its Anglo Base Metals Division from 2001 to 2007, chairman of the Tarmac Group from 2005 to 2007, and executive director Anglo American plc from 2005 to 2007.

Thompson served on the boards of directors of AngloGold Ashanti from 2004 to 2008, Rusal from 2007 to 2009, Newmont from 2008 to 2014, Sandvik from 2008 to 2015, and Amec Foster Wheeler from 2009 to 2015. Thompson was chairman of Tullow Oil from 2011 to 2017. He joined the Board of Rio Tinto in 2014 and was chairman from 2018 to 2022. In 2020, while Thompson was chairman, Rio Tinto destroyed a 46,000-year-old Aboriginal site at Juukan Gorge in Western Australia. Thompson served as chairman of 3i from 2015 to 2021.

Thompson has been a director of the British Geological Survey since 2022, a senior adviser to Rothschild & Co. since 2022, a member of the Peak District National Park Authority since 2023 and chairman of the Met Office since 2024.

Thompson has served on the advisory council of the Institute of Business Ethics since 2015 and as its president since 2023. He has been a member of the Energy Transition Commission since 2019. He is an hon. professor at the University of Exeter, faculty of environment, science and economy.

== Personal life ==
Thompson married Fiona Graham-Bryce in 1986. He is a member of the Athenæum Club and the Alpine Club, and he is the author of two books about climbing and hiking.

== Works ==
- Thompson, Simon (2010). Unjustifiable Risk? The Story of British Climbing. Milnthorpe, Cumbria, U.K.: Cicerone Press. ISBN 9781849656993. OCLC 893659566.
- Thompson, Simon (2013). A Long Walk with Lord Conway: An Exploration of the Alps and an English Adventurer. Oxford, U.K.: Signal Books. ISBN 9781908493804. OCLC 871584256.
