= Hawk Green =

Coordinates: 53.3845°N 2.0669°W

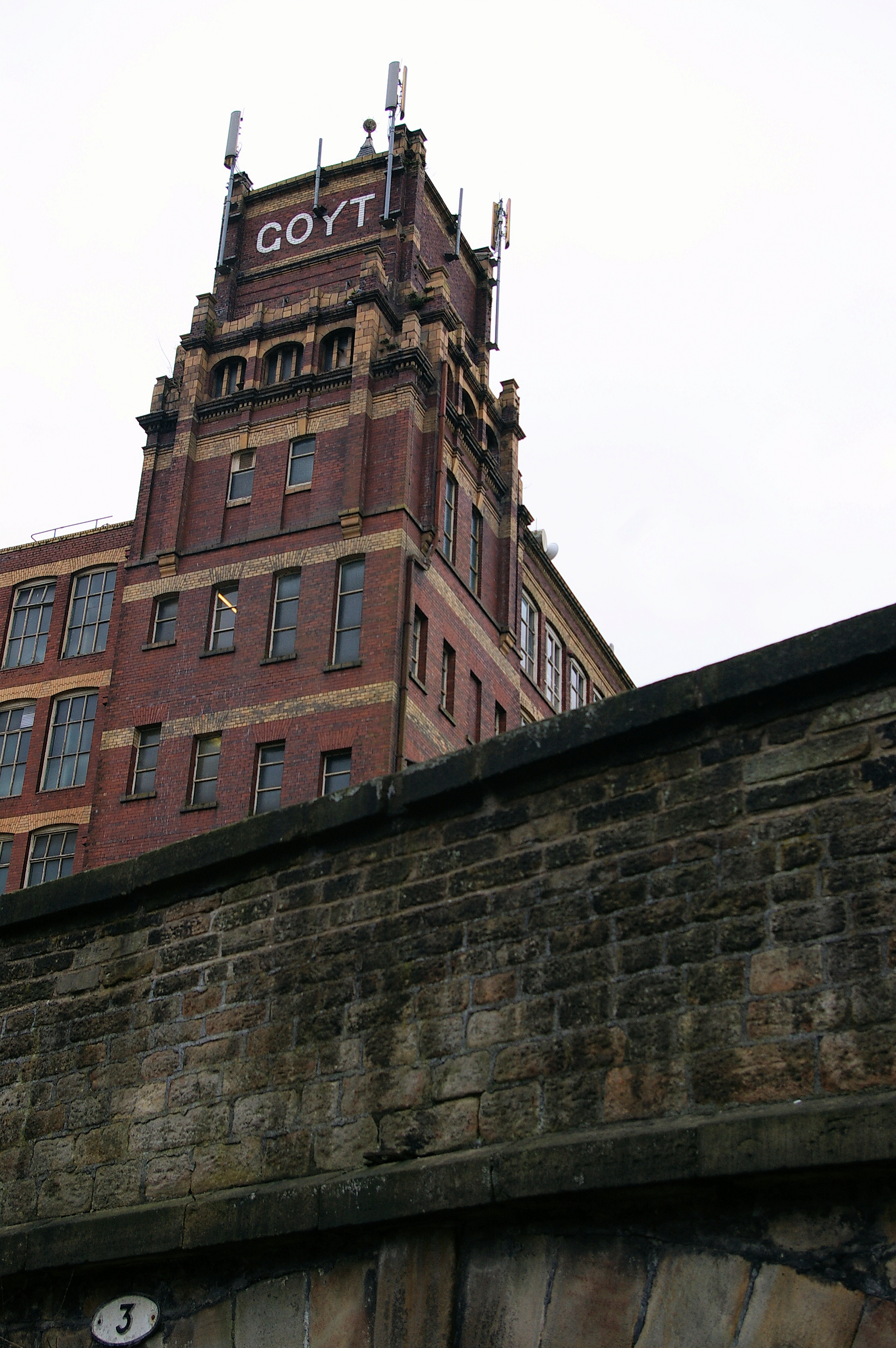
- Goyt Mill, a former cotton mill

- Location within Greater Manchester
- OS grid reference: SJ955875
- Metropolitan borough: Stockport
- Metropolitan county: Greater Manchester
- Region: North West
- Country: England
- Sovereign state: United Kingdom
- Post town: STOCKPORT
- Postcode district: SK6
- Dialling code: 0161
- Police: Greater Manchester
- Fire: Greater Manchester
- Ambulance: North West
- UK Parliament: Hazel Grove

Hawk Green is a suburb of Marple, Greater Manchester, England, on the Macclesfield Canal around a traditional village green. High Lane is to the south and Turf Lea to the east.

Just to the north of the centre of Hawk Green is Goyt Mill, a former cotton mill that now houses various businesses and recreational facilities. It was once home to the Frost family who, in 1823, except for their youngest daughter, Annie, died in a fire close to it. Charles Frost was a fantasy novelist.

== Sport ==
Hawk Green Cricket Club is on Rhode Fields, off Upper Hibbert Lane. The 1st and 2nd XI senior teams compete in the Cheshire Cricket League, a Womans XI competes in the Cheshire Womans Cricket League and a junior section plays in the Cheshire County Cricket League Junior Section.
