= The Rainband =

- Origin: Manchester, England
- Genres: Indie Rock
- Years active: 2010–present
- Labels: Relay Music
- Members: Martin Finnigan (Vocals); Phil Rainey (Guitar); Joe Wilson (Guitar); Sam Wilson (Bass); James Cowell (Drums); Dan Whitelegg (Manager)
- Website: https://www.therainband.co.uk

The Rainband were a five-piece indie rock band from Manchester, England founded in 2010 by lead singer Martin Finnigan and guitarist Phil Rainey – who made his name with Peter Hook's cult combo Monaco. Finnigan and Rainey were joined by drummer Steve Irlam (replaced by James Cowell in 2015) and bassist Paul Daggatt later that year. In 2012 Paul Daggatt left and was replaced by Joe Wilson, who then moved onto guitar while his brother Sam Wilson took on bass.

To this day The Rainband have released three original studio EP's ('The Prodigal EP', 'Fire EP' and 'Sirens EP') and several singles. Their single 'Rise Again', a tribute to legendary MotoGP rider Marco Simoncelli, entered the UK Independent Charts at No.9 and remained in the Virgin Radio Italian charts during fourteen weeks, peaking at No.5. Double Superbike world champion James Toseland played the piano on the track and joined The Rainband on stage in Norwich and at the MotoGP in Silverstone in support of the project in aid of the Marco Simoncelli Foundation. Martin Finnigan is currently ambassador for the Simoncelli Foundation in the UK.

The band made their debut at Glastonbury Festival in June 2013 on one of the main stages. Their past live performances include supports for Simple Minds, Kaiser Chiefs and Ocean Colour Scene. In July 2014 The Rainband were Special Guests of Scottish singer-songwriter Paolo Nutini at Goa-Boa Festival in Genova, Hydrogen Live (Piazzola Sul Brenta, Padova) and Rock in Roma where they had supported Simple Minds in 2012. Rolling Stone featured them extensively following their performances as Nutini's support.

== Discography ==
=== Singles ===
- Broken Youth (2010)
- She’s A Rainbow (2011)
- The Prodigal, feat. Rowetta (2011)
- Rise Again, feat. James Toseland (2012)
- World We Seek (2013)
- Fire (2013)
- Sirens (2014)
- Built For Change (2014)

=== EPs ===
- The Prodigal (2011)
- The Prodigal Deluxe (2011)
- Fire (2013)
- Sirens (2014)

=== Albums ===
- Satellite Sunrise (2016)
- The Shape of Things to Come (2018)
