= Stockport Rural District =

Former local government area in the UK

Coordinates: 53.408°N 2.116°W

Stockport was a rural district in the administrative county of Cheshire from 1894 to 1904. The district was the successor to the Stockport Rural Sanitary District formed in 1875.

The rural district was originally composed of eight civil parishes (with population in 1891):

- Bosden (2,342)
- Bramhall (3,365)
- Brinnington (7,061)
- Handforth (794)
- Norbury (1,495)
- Offerton (372)
- Torkington (294)
- Werneth, renamed Compstall 1897 (2,587)

In 1900 Hazel Grove and Bramhall Urban District was formed from five of the parishes in the rural district (Bosden, Bramhall, Norbury, Offerton, and Torkington).

In 1902 Compstall was constituted an urban district, and Brinnington became part of Bredbury and Romiley Urban District. The remaining parish in the district, Handforth, became an urban district in 1904.
