= Tarkington (automobile) =

Two-door, six-cylinder, gas-powered car

The Tarkington automobile was a two-door, six-cylinder, gas-powered car built in the early 1920s in Rockford, Illinois.

Joseph Arthur Tarkington tried very hard to get his car into mass-production, but was unsuccessful. The company was incorporated in January 1920 with $500,000 of initial funding. It took three years before a prototype was displayed to the public. The vehicles had a home-made six- cylinder engine with OHV valve control. It was specified with a 260 cubic inches (about 4261 cm³) displacement and 54 hp. The chassis had a wheelbase of 320 cm. The only body design was an open touring car with five seats. Although well received by the press, additional capital needed for mass production was not forthcoming and the company was dissolved on June 1, 1923.

Joseph filed several patents for the car, and there are stories that he was a pioneer in many things related to the automobile, albeit never receiving any credit. Here is an excerpt from the family tree website of Karl Swenson, a man who built the Tarkington with Joseph:

Carl was one of the people who tried to produce an automobile by the name of the Tarkington. He and his dad and Mr. Tarkington worked at this and had 6 cars made. They failed to get the funding needed to get them mass-produced so had to quit the project. Carl was an avid golfer and being the engineer he was, worked very hard to perfect his golf swing.

All six cars produced by the company were eventually scrapped.
