= Turkington =

Turkington is an English surname.

Notable people with the surname include:

- Gregg Turkington (born 1967), American comedian and musician
- Colin Turkington (born 1982), British racing driver
- Scott Turkington, American organist
- Edward Turkington (1899–1996), American rugby union player
- Eric Turkington (born 1947), American lawyer and politician
- Robert Turkington (1920–1945), Northern Irish flying ace
