= Talkington =

Talkington may refer to:

== Institutions ==
- Talkington College of Visual & Performing Arts

== People with the surname ==
- Amy Talkington
- Fiona Talkington

== Places ==
- Talkington Township, Sangamon County, Illinois
