= Macclesfield Hundred =

Historical division of Cheshire, England

Coordinates: 53.261°N 2.128°W

- Status: Hundred
- Subdivisions
  - Type: Parishes

The hundred of Macclesfield was an ancient division of the historic county of Cheshire, in northern England. It was known to have been in existence at least as early as 1242, and it was formed to a great extent from the earlier Domesday hundred of Hamestan.

When the Hundred of Hameston was formed, the village which was later named Macclesfield was the principal settlement in East Cheshire. It became the location of administration for the Hundred of Hameston, and the Hundred Court was held there. It is not known when or why the village and Hundred became known as Macclesfield.

In 1361 Edward, the Black Prince was lord of the hundred, manor and borough of Macclesfield.

== Parishes ==
Until 1866 the Hundred of Macclesfield contained, in addition to Macclesfield itself, the following eight ancient parishes:

- Alderley
- Astbury
- Cheadle
- Gawsworth
- Mottram in Longdendale
- Northenden
- Stockport
- Wilmslow

The Poor Law Amendment Act 1866 provided the townships contained within these parishes became Civil Parishes in their own right.

== Courts ==
Courts, or Eyres, were normally held annually in the region, a week after the close of the County Court. The Justice of Chester presided over the courts, and he would spend several days visiting each hundred in the region.

== See also ==
- Hundreds of Cheshire
- Ancient parishes of Cheshire

== Notes and references ==
=== Bibliography ===
- Clayton, Dorothy J. (1990), The Administration of the County Palatine of Chester, 1442–1485, Manchester University Press ND, ISBN 0-7190-1343-7
- Davies, C. Stella (1976), A History Of Macclesfield, Didsbury, Manchester and Macclesfield: E.J. Morten, ISBN 0859720349
- Dunn, F. I. (1987), The Ancient Parishes, Townships, and Chapelries of Cheshire, Chester: Cheshire Record Office and Chester Diocesan Record Office, ISBN 0-906758-14-9
- Harris, B. E.; Thacker, A. T. (1987), The Victoria History of the County of Chester. (Volume 1: Physique, Prehistory, Roman, Anglo-Saxon, and Domesday), Oxford: Oxford University Press, ISBN 0-19-722761-9
- Higham, N. J. (1993), The origins of Cheshire, (Origins of the shire), Manchester: Manchester University Press, ISBN 0719031605
- Mortimer, William Williams (1847), The History of the Hundred of Wirral, Whittaker & Co.
