= County Borough of Stockport =

Former municipal borough in present-day town of Stockport

Coordinates: 53°24′24″N 2°09′30″W

Stockport
- Stockport CB within Cheshire in 1970
- Area
  - 1911: 5,488 acres (22.21 km^{2})
  - 1961: 8,440 acres (34.2 km^{2})
- Population
  - 1901: 92,832
  - 1971: 139,598
- History
  - Created: 1835
  - Abolished: 1974
  - Succeeded by: Metropolitan Borough of Stockport
- Status: Municipal borough 1835–1889; County borough 1889–1974
- Government
  - HQ: Stockport Town Hall
  - Motto: Animo et Fide (With Courage and Faith)
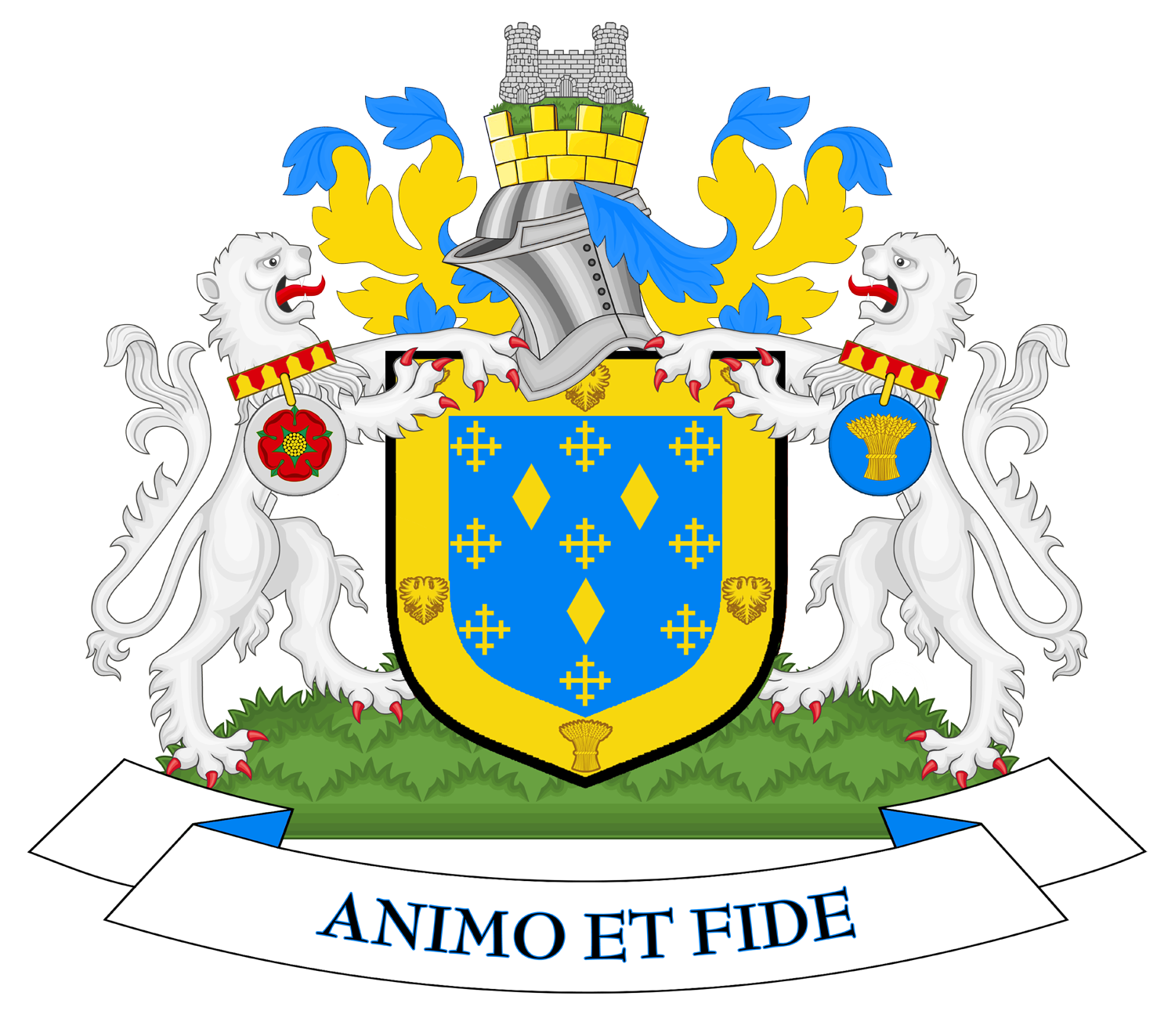

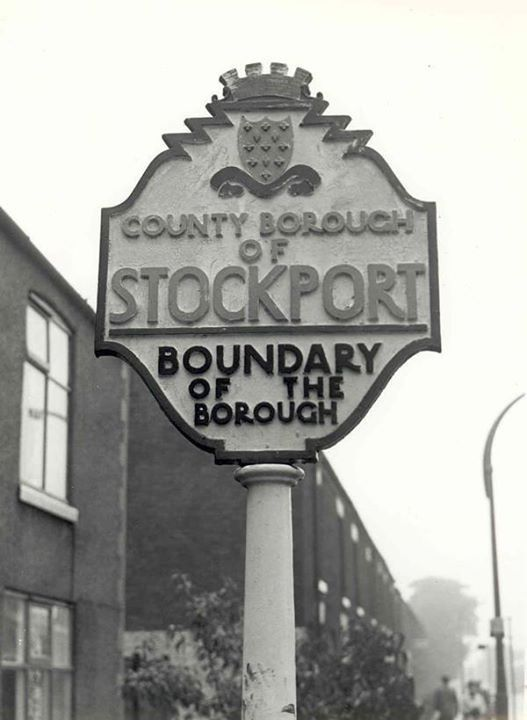
Boundary sign for the County Borough

Stockport County Borough was a county-level local authority between 1889 and 1974.

The town of Stockport had been an ancient borough governed by a charter dating from c. 1220, granted by Ranulph de Blondeville, 4th Earl of Chester. It was reformed to become a municipal borough in 1836 under the Municipal Corporations Act 1835. The municipal borough consisted of parts of Cheshire, namely the township of Stockport and the neighbouring areas of Edgeley and Portwood, and part of Heaton Norris in Lancashire.

When elected county councils were established in 1889 under the Local Government Act 1888, Stockport was considered large enough to provide its own county-level services, and so it became a county borough, independent of the county councils of Cheshire and Lancashire. The county borough continued to be divided between the two counties for judicial and lieutenancy purposes.

Under the Stockport (Extension) Order 1901 the borough was enlarged, absorbing the urban district of Reddish in Lancashire as well a number of parts of Cheshire parishes. The Stockport (Extension) Order 1913 saw a further enlargement with the absorption of Heaton Norris Urban District from Lancashire.

In 1956 the borough was placed entirely in Lancashire for judicial purposes, whilst continuing to straddle Cheshire and Lancashire for the purposes of lieutenancy.

The county borough was abolished by the Local Government Act 1972 with its territory forming part of the Metropolitan Borough of Stockport district of Greater Manchester.

== Corporation ==
The Municipal Corporations Act 1835 designated all qualified residents of the town as "burgesses" and formed them into a body corporate by the name of the "Mayor, aldermen and Burgesses of the Borough of Stockport". The burgesses elected a town council, which initially consisted of a mayor, six aldermen and 18 councillors. The borough was divided into six wards: Edgeley, Heaton Norris, Middle, Portwood, St Mary's and St Thomas's, each returning one alderman and three councillors.

In 1894 the number of wards was increased to fourteen: Cale Green, Edgeley, Heaton Lane, Heaviley, Hempshaw Lane, Holywood, Lancashire Hill, Old Road, Portwood, St Mary's, St Thomas's, Shaw Heath, Spring Bank and Vernon. The corporation was accordingly enlarged to 14 aldermen and 42 councillors. Additional wards were added when the borough was extended: Reddish North and Reddish South in 1901 and Heaton Norris North and South in 1913. The corporation subsequently had 18 aldermen and 54 councillors. The ward boundaries were subsequently redrawn in 1935, although they remained 18 in number: Spring Bank ward was abolished and a new ward of Davenport created. In 1971 the wards were completely redrawn and bore the following names: Adswood, Brinnington, Cale Green, Cheadle Heath, Davenport, Edgeley, Heaton Chapel, Heaton Moor, Heaton Norris, Heaviley, Lancashire Hill, Little Moor, Longford, Manor, Offerton, Reddish Green and Vernon.

=== Political control ===
In the early years of the council, political labels were not used. By the 1880s, however, a Liberal administration was in control. In 1904 the Liberals lost their overall majority after "twenty years". In the following year Conservatives gained control. 1905 also saw the first election of Labour councillors. Conservatives held power until 1929, when they lost their majority, but remaining the largest party on the council. From 1934 to 1945 Conservatives once again controlled the borough. The council was under no overall control from 1945 to 1947, when the Conservatives regained control, holding the council for seven years. In 1954 Labour took power for the first time, and held the borough until 1968. In 1968 Conservatives regained control, with Labour returning to power in the final borough election prior to abolition in 1972.

== Coat of arms ==
Unofficial arms used prior to 1932

In 1836 the new borough corporation adopted a common seal, incorporating an unofficial coat of arms. The shield was blue with three gold lozenges between nine cross-crosslets. This was said to the arms of the Stopford or Stockport family, whom the Earl of Chester granted the Barony of Stockport in his county palatine. On either side of the shield was a lion and the figure of Britannia. Above the shield was a mural crown and a banner inscribed "Corporate [i.e. municipal] Reform January 1836"

On 5 December 1932, the county borough obtained a grant of arms and crest from the College of Arms. This consisted of the unofficial arms within a gold bordure or border. On the bordure were placed three garbs (wheatsheaves) and three double-headed eagles. The garbs represented the county of Cheshire, while the eagles were taken from the arms of the de Eton family. The crest was a representation of the town's medieval castle.

On 1 December 1959, an additional grant of supporters was made. These were two white lions each with a gold and red collar in a "vairy" pattern. The lions were from the arms of the de Warren family who held the manor of Stockport until 1826. The vair pattern was from the arms of the Ferrers family, Earls of Derby. A disc hung from the collar of each lion: one bearing the red Lancashire rose, the other a Cheshire garb.

The full blazon of the arms was as follows:

Azure semée of cross crosslets three lozenges Or; a bordure of the last charged with three garbs and as many double headed eagles displayed alternately of the first. And for a Crest: issuant from a mural crown Or a mount vert, thereon a castle with two towers proper. Mantled azure, doubled Or. Supporters: On either side a lion argent that to the dexter gorged with a collar vairy Or and gules pendent therefrom by a chain gold a plate charged with a rose gules barbed and seeded proper; that to the sinister likewise collared and pendent from the collar by a like chain a hurt charged with a garb also gold.

== Town hall ==
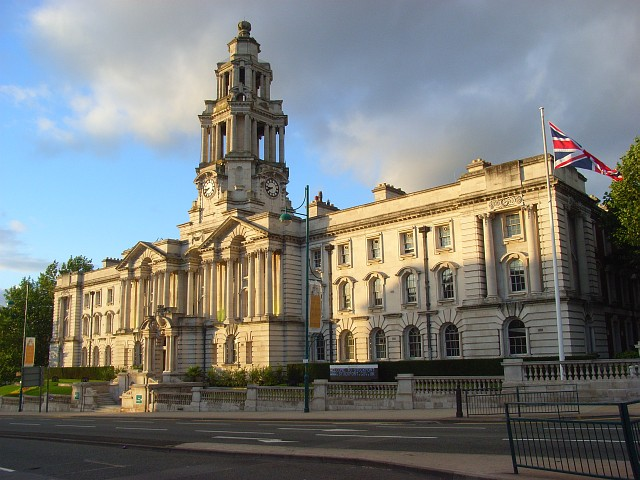
Stockport Town Hall

The borough council initially had no single administrative headquarters with offices based in various parts of the town. A former warehouse in Warren Street was used to house council meetings as well as the magistrates' court, police station and cells. The foundation stone of the town hall was laid in October 1904, with the top stone of the clock tower being laid by the Mayor of Stockport in January 1907. The "wedding cake" town hall was designed by Sir Alfred Brumwell Thomas, who was also responsible for Belfast City Hall.

== Stockport Corporation Transport ==
The borough council took over the privately operated horse tram networks in the town in 1901 and replaced them with electric trams. At its peak the tramways department had 85 trams and had joint running agreements with the neighbouring municipalities of Manchester and Hyde, and the network extended outside the borough boundaries to Hazel Grove and Gatley. The trams were replaced with motorbuses in 1949–1951. Trams and buses operated in a red and ivory livery. The operation passed to SELNEC Passenger Transport Executive in 1969.

== Water supply ==
Stockport Corporation Water Act 1899
- Act of Parliament
- Parliament of the United Kingdom
- Long title: An Act to authorise the Mayor Aldermen and Burgesses of the County Borough of Stockport to purchase the undertaking of the Stockport District Waterworks Company and for other purposes.
- Citation: 62 & 63 Vict. c. ccvii

Dates
- Royal assent: 1 August 1899

Stockport Corporation Water Act 1901
- Act of Parliament
- Parliament of the United Kingdom
- Long title: An Act to empower the Mayor Aldermen and Burgesses of the County Borough of Stockport to construct additional waterworks and for other purposes.
- Citation: 1 Edw. 7. c. cxcviii

Dates
- Royal assent: 9 August 1901

Other legislation
- Repealed by: Manchester Water (No. 3) Order 1961

Status: Repealed

Stockport Corporation commenced supplying water after it took over the private Stockport District Waterworks Company under the Stockport Corporation Water Act 1899 (62 & 63 Vict. c. ccvii). Under the terms of the Stockport Corporation Water Act 1901 (1 Edw. 7. c. cxcviii), the Stockport Corporation Waterworks supplied water to an area of eighty square miles including and surrounding the borough.

A reservoir was constructed below Kinder Scout, in the Derbyshire Peak District. The waterworks opened in 1912, and the Kinder Reservoir had a capacity of 515 million imperial gallons (2,340,000 m^{3}) and covered 44 acres (180,000 m^{2}). At the time of its construction it was stated to have the largest earth dam in the world.

Stockport Corporation Act 1930
- Act of Parliament
- Parliament of the United Kingdom
- Long title: An Act to empower the mayor aldermen and burgesses of the county borough of Stockport to construct new reservoirs and other works in connection with their water undertaking to construct a new road in the said borough to acquire lands and for other purposes.
- Citation: 20 & 21 Geo. 5. c. clxix

Dates
- Royal assent: 1 August 1930

Text of statute as originally enacted

In the 1930s the corporation acquired land in the Goyt Valley, building two more reservoirs under the Stockport Corporation Act 1930 (20 & 21 Geo. 5. c. clxix): Fernilee opened in 1938 and Errwood in 1967.

The Stockport and District Water Board was formed on 1 April 1962 by the Stockport and District Water Board Order 1962 (SI 1962/467), with its membership made up of members of Stockport Borough Council, the urban district councils of Alderley Edge, Bredbury and Romiley, Cheadle and Gatley, Hazel Grove and Bramhall, Marple, New Mills, Whaley Bridge and Wilmslow and Disley Rural District Council. The water board's assets passed to the North West Water Authority under the Water Act 1973.

== Local elections ==
- 1901 Stockport Borough Council election
- 1902 Stockport Borough Council election
- 1903 Stockport Borough Council election
- 1904 Stockport Borough Council election
- 1905 Stockport Borough Council election
- 1906 Stockport Borough Council election
- 1907 Stockport Borough Council election
- 1908 Stockport Borough Council election
- 1909 Stockport Borough Council election
- 1910 Stockport Borough Council election
- 1911 Stockport Borough Council election
- 1912 Stockport Borough Council election
- 1913 Stockport Borough Council election
- 1914 Stockport Borough Council election
- 1919 Stockport Borough Council election
- 1920 Stockport Borough Council election
- 1921 Stockport Borough Council election
- 1922 Stockport Borough Council election
- 1923 Stockport Borough Council election
- 1924 Stockport Borough Council election
- 1925 Stockport Borough Council election
- 1926 Stockport Borough Council election
- 1927 Stockport Borough Council election
- 1928 Stockport Borough Council election
- 1929 Stockport Borough Council election
- 1930 Stockport Borough Council election
- 1931 Stockport Borough Council election
- 1932 Stockport Borough Council election
- 1933 Stockport Borough Council election
- 1934 Stockport Borough Council election
- 1935 Stockport Borough Council election
- 1936 Stockport Borough Council election
- 1937 Stockport Borough Council election
- 1938 Stockport Borough Council election
- 1945 Stockport Borough Council election
- 1946 Stockport Borough Council election
- 1947 Stockport Borough Council election
- 1949 Stockport Borough Council election
- 1950 Stockport Borough Council election
- 1951 Stockport Borough Council election
- 1952 Stockport Borough Council election
- 1953 Stockport Borough Council election
- 1954 Stockport Borough Council election
- 1955 Stockport Borough Council election
- 1956 Stockport Borough Council election
- 1957 Stockport Borough Council election
- 1958 Stockport Borough Council election
- 1959 Stockport Borough Council election
- 1960 Stockport Borough Council election
- 1961 Stockport Borough Council election
- 1962 Stockport Borough Council election
- 1963 Stockport Borough Council election
- 1964 Stockport Borough Council election
- 1965 Stockport Borough Council election
- 1966 Stockport Borough Council election
- 1967 Stockport Borough Council election
- 1968 Stockport Borough Council election
- 1969 Stockport Borough Council election
- 1970 Stockport Borough Council election
- 1971 Stockport Borough Council election
- 1972 Stockport Borough Council election
