= Slush pile =

Unsolicited, unpublished, and unwanted letters or manuscripts sent to a publisher

In publishing, a slush pile is a set of unsolicited query letters or manuscripts that have either been directly sent to a publisher or literary agent by an author, or which have been delivered via a literary agent representing the author who may or may not be familiar to the publisher. The responsibility of sifting through slush piles is usually reserved either to an editor's assistants or to outside contractors called publisher's readers or "first readers". If the reader finds something of interest and can convince a senior editor to accept it, they may earn credit. Increasingly, there is dialogue and debate over whether AI tools may be used to evaluate manuscript submissions.

Slush piles are often regarded as undesirable due to the large number of aspiring writers who produce content that does not meet the expectations of editors or agents, which has led many to refuse receipt of unsolicited manuscripts. However, this is not necessarily the case with many smaller publishers, independent editors or newer agents.

In the early 1980s, Doubleday decided to no longer accept submissions of unsolicited manuscripts, citing the time and physical resources the practice took up.

In 2008, HarperCollins introduced a website, authonomy, to manage and exploit the slush pile from a web-based perspective, but it was closed in 2015 because writers were gaming the system. Website Youwriteon acts as a slush pile filter for Random House, Orion Publishing Group and Bloomsbury Publishing.

== Etymology ==
The earliest known use of the term "slush pile" in the context of unsolicited manuscripts appears in a 1952 Berkshire Evening Eagle article. One theory suggests the name derives from manuscripts being manually delivered through office transoms when presses were closed, creating literal piles resembling mounds of slushy snow. Another theory connects it to "slush fund," referring to a reserve of unassigned resources that may hold future value.

== Digital submissions ==
With the rise of the internet, physical manuscript deliveries have largely been replaced by email inboxes and online submission portals. Submission management software such as Submittable has been adopted by many publications to organize and track incoming manuscripts digitally.

== Notable discoveries ==
Despite its reputation, the slush pile has produced some celebrated works. The 1976 novel Ordinary People was the first manuscript accepted by Viking Press from the slush pile in 27 years. Tom Clancy's The Hunt for Red October was published from the Naval Institute Press slush pile.

Many now-celebrated works were rejected numerous times before publication. J. K. Rowling's first Harry Potter manuscript was rejected by approximately twelve publishers before being accepted. Stephen King's Carrie was rejected 30 times before it was published in 1974 and became a bestseller. William Golding's Lord of the Flies was turned down 20 times before publication.
