= Personalized learning =

Term referring to efforts to tailor education to meet the different needs of students

Personalized learning (also named individualized instruction, personal learning place or direct instruction) refers to a type of learning where learners are provided with experiences that uniquely meet their needs, interests and educational outcomes.

== Overview ==
Use of the term "personalized learning" dates back to the early 1960s, but there is no widespread agreement on the definition and components of a personal learning environment. Even enthusiasts for the concept admit that personal learning is an evolving term and does not have any widely accepted definition.

In 2005, Dan Buckley defined two ends of the personalized learning spectrum: "personalization for the learner", in which the teacher tailors the learning to the student, and "personalization by the learner", in which the student develops skills to tailor their own learning. This spectrum was adopted by the Microsoft's 2006 Practical Guide to Envisioning and Transforming Education.

== Definitions ==
The United States National Education Technology Plan 2017 defines "personalized learning" as follows:

Personalized learning refers to instruction in which the pace of learning and the instructional approach are optimized for the needs of each learner. Learning objectives, instructional approaches, and instructional content (and its sequencing) may all vary based on learner needs. In addition, learning activities are meaningful and relevant to learners, driven by their interests, and often self-initiated.

Technology is typically used to try to facilitate personalized learning environments.

AI is often used as a source to develop personalized learning programs for students. Chatbots based on large language models are sometimes described as a promising opportunity for personalized learning on a large scale.

According to researcher Eduard Pogorskiy:

ICT can be a powerful tool for personalized learning as it allows learners access to research and information, and provides a mechanism for communication, debate, and recording learning achievements. However, personalized learning is not exclusive to digital technologies or environments. In the rhetoric around 21st Century Skills, personalized learning is often equated with 'customization' (as found in the business world), with digital personalization used to frame the learning experience as highly efficient. Problematic in this is the discounting of the highly relational and socially constructed space well defined in the research on learning. Narrowing personalized learning to its digital form also raises the concern of the echo chamber effect emerging in (hyper)personalized online experiences.

== Conferring ==
As stated above by the 2017 United States National Education Technology Plan, "Personalized learning refers to instruction in which the pace of learning and the instructional approach are optimized the needs for each learner." Conferring is a process in which this can be accomplished. Conferring, as defined by Julie Kallio, is a "regular, goal-oriented meeting between the teacher and student(s) where they talk about learning progress, process, and/or products." Conferring, more simply, is a way to provide more personalized feedback.

Learning, in any context, requires some form of feedback. In schools, most feedback is thought of as specifically feedback between the teacher and the student. The idea of providing feedback to advance student learning is best understood in the framework of the "zone of proximal development" (ZPD). Psychologist Lev Vygotski has defined the ZPD as "the distance between the actual developmental level as determined by independent problem solving and the level of potential development as determined through problem solving under adult guidance or in collaboration with more capable peers." More plainly, a student has a certain level they can achieve by themselves and with support they are able to achieve a higher level of learning. However, there is still some level in which the student is incapable of reaching, no matter what support is provided. For example, a student may be working on double digit addition. Their current knowledge may already provide them with the skills to move on to triple digit addition without any help. If the student is introduced to multiplication, however, they will need help to understand that multiplication is a quicker way to represent the same number being added onto itself a defined number of times. Where this help occurs is the student's ZPD. Even with help though, it is not reasonable to expect the student to learn how to solve a calculus problem. The struggle for teachers is how to provide the right amount of help to each student. If a teacher provides information to the whole class too quickly, some students are left behind trying to figure out the first step. Conversely, if a teacher provides information to the whole class too slowly, some students will finish rapidly and be left with nothing to do. Conferring is a tool that teachers have used to help mitigate that issue.

Conferring first gained prominence in the book One to one: the art of conferring with young writers by Lucy Calkins, Amanda Hartman, and Zoe Ryder White. In the work, Calkins and her co-writers describe how effective writing workshops for students included individual writing conferences (conferring), where teachers would sit and talk with their students about their writing. Per the book, "Conferring can give us the force that makes our mini-lessons and curriculum development and assessment and everything else more powerful. It gives us an endless resource of teaching wisdom, an endless source of accountability, a system of checks and balances. And, it gives us laughter and human connection -the understanding of our children that gives spirit to our teaching." Calkins believed that there were three main components to every conferring session: Research, Decide, and Teach. Research focused on where the student was in their current writing, Decide would help the teacher choose what to teach the student, and Teach would use modeling and guiding practice to further advance student learning. In their book The Writing Workshop, Katie Wood Ray and Lester L. Laminack expanded upon Calkins's approach by adding a fourth component called "Make a Record" after the teaching portion. This modified model can be thought in the terms of: research, decide, teach, record.

Using a mix method case study approach in observing a group of 4th grade students, Javaye Devette Stubbs posed the question: "How does the implementation of one-on-one conferring promote higher order thinking skills in students with difficulties in reading?" The results from her pre and post-test found that "even those with reading difficulties did show a significant gain in higher order thinking skills". In a separate study, the educator Antony Smith examined the effectiveness of using teacher-student writing conference for English language learners (ELLs). Observing two students who were ELLs in a second-grade classroom working on a book project, Smith found that the work produced "looks similar to what is produced by native English speakers". Smith later suggests that the success of the two students were largely tied to the writing conferences, and goes on to state that writing conferences are the "heart of the writing process, and with this in mind, the potential of the teacher-student writing conference becomes clear".

The information can be summarized into three main takeaways. First, building student knowledge is dependent on the current level of knowledge the student has and what kind of support they are provided. Second, conferring is a model that can provide student support through a structured four-part process. Third, conferring has been shown to increase student learning in both reading and writing.

== Debate ==
Advocates for personalized learning say that many elements of curriculum, assessment, and instructional design must be present in classrooms for students to succeed, and recommend the use of software systems to manage and facilitate student-led instruction. Supporters argue that classroom learning activities must build upon students' prior knowledge, and that teachers need to allocate time for practice. Advocates also argue that teachers must continuously assess student learning against clearly defined standards and goals, and student input into the assessment process is integral.

Determining how a student most efficiently learns can be time-consuming, resulting in class time being used up and effectively a less efficient use of time. Andy Hargreaves and Dennis Shirley wrote that while there are advantages in students being able to access information instantly online, one should not mistake these processes for "something deeper, more challenging, and more connected to compelling issues in their world and their lives."

Alfie Kohn argued in 2015 that while personalized learning may sound like a useful strategy for education, in reality it is a business tactic to increase sales of technology products. Personalized learning promises a strategy to specifically adjust education to the unique needs and skills of individual children, he argued, but really it means merely "adjusting the difficulty level of prefabricated skills-based exercises based on students' test scores... [and] requires the purchase of software from one of those companies that can afford full-page ads in Education Week." While "certain forms of technology can be used to support progressive education", Kohn wrote, "...meaningful (and truly personal) learning never requires technology. Therefore, if an idea like personalization is presented from the start as entailing software or a screen, we ought to be extremely skeptical about who really benefits."

Dr. Ces'Ari Garcia-Delmuro advocated in her research on personalized learning for other researchers to continue including teacher voice in their studies of personalized learning programs as a way to improve these programs for teachers and students. She said more studies should be conducted that focus on other low socioeconomic status schools implementing personalized learning.

== See also ==
- Adaptive learning
- Blended learning
- Flip teaching
- Gradual release of responsibility
- Mastery learning
- School of one
- School organizational models
- Teachers College Reading and Writing Project
