= Writers workshop (activity) =

Group sessions where writers critique each other's work

A writing workshop is a group session where writers gather to share, critique and improve their work. Various models of writing workshops have been developed over time to suit different educational settings and writing goals. Workshop attendance might be restricted to a select group (such as a writers' circle or class) or open to the public.

== Workshop models ==
Most workshops include some kind of sharing of work, reflection upon and discussion of the work, and often suggestions for improvement. There may or may not be a facilitator, who is usually an established writer or teacher, but can be a volunteer from among the group. Workshops can work on very established rules and formats, or can be more freeform.

=== Traditional workshop model ===
The traditional workshop model, also known as the Iowa model, was developed at the University of Iowa Writers' Workshop in the mid-20th century, under the directorship of Paul Engle. It typically involves:

- Submission: Participants submit their writing in advance. Each participant is expected to read everyone else's work and come up with feedback.
- Critique: During the workshop, participants take turns to provide feedback on each person's work in turn. When it's their turn to receive group critique, writers cannot speak (the "gag rule").
- Discussion: After receiving critique, the writer engages in discussion with the group. This may include troubleshooting and answering questions about the work.

This model emphasises peer critique and iterative improvement, and is the most recognisable workshop model. The "gag rule" is the most contentious element of the workshop, since it silences authors, which might aggravate power imbalances in the workshop. Its original aim, however, is to prevent the author from missing feedback by trying to defend or explain their work.

=== Guided workshop model ===
The guided workshop model incorporates elements of direct instruction alongside peer critique. It involves:

- Mini-Lessons: Instructors provide short lessons on specific writing techniques.
- Guided Practice: Participants apply these techniques to their own writing.
- Peer Feedback: Writers exchange feedback on drafts, guided by the instructor's prompts.

This model aims to balance individualised instruction with collaborative learning. More advanced forms of guided workshop, particularly when they focus on a single element of craft, may be called masterclasses.

One form of guided workshop designed for school-age children is TCRWP's Writing Workshop, developed by Lucy Calkins as part of her controversial Teachers College Reading & Writing Project curriculum.

=== Draft workshop ===
The 40-minute draft workshop, used at Princeton, aims to root critique in honest feedback, while also strengthening participants' critical reading and writing skills. The process is as follows:

- Prep work
  - Draft work is shared with participants.
  - Participants write a short letter responding to the draft, including a summary of what they think the work's motivation and thesis are, and identifying one strength and one weakness (using appropriate academic terminology). The letter should include ideas for revision to address the weakness.
  - Participants bring a copy of the letter for the writer, as well as retaining a copy for themselves.
- Step 1 (2 minutes)
  - The writer of the draft shares a brief statement of what they think the work's thesis is, and some brief hopes for revision.
- Step 2 (10 minutes)
  - Participants point out the text's strengths, always referring to the text for evidence.
- Step 3 (25 minutes)
  - The participants now identify weaknesses, again citing specific examples in the text, offering revision strategies where possible.
- Step 4 (3 minutes)
  - The writer reflects on the feedback, noting their priorities for revision, and thanks the participants for their contributions.

Because the participants are empowered to deliver feedback directly, rather than relying on a teacher to guide them, the process aims to phase out the use of a facilitator. Referring back to the text when making critiques, and using "high-order Lexicon element[s]", strengthens students' critical reading and writing skills, which is particularly useful in an academic setting. Writing feedback down in advance helps keep the discussion on track and provides a record of feedback if anything gets missed.

== Critical response process ==
In 1990, Liz Lerman created the Critical Response Process (CRP), a highly structured method of feedback often used in creative writing. Lerman developed the Process after realising artists tended to apologise, rather than ask questions, when presenting unfinished work. An important point to note is that unsolicited feedback can't be shared. The relevant steps are:

- Statements of Meaning: The writer shares their work, while responders share what they find meaningful, memorable, or intriguing.
- Questions from the Writer: The writer asks specific questions about aspects of their work they are uncertain about or seeking input on.
- Neutral Questions from Responders: Responders ask neutral questions to help the writer explore their work further, without giving direct advice.
- Opinions and Suggestions: Finally, responders can offer their opinions and suggestions, but only after the writer has had the chance to reflect on the feedback received.

This process encourages constructive dialogue and empowers writers to make informed decisions about their work. To make unsolicited feedback, a responder first has to ask the writer for permission in the final stage (Opinions and Suggestions); the writer can always say no.
