= Teach to One =

- New York City

Information
- Type: Middle School program
- Motto: "Reimagining the classroom to meet the needs of every student"
- Established: 2009
- Chancellor: Joel I. Klein
- Interim Acting Deputy Chancellor: John White
- Enrollment: Approx. 1,500
- Participating Schools: MS 131; IS 228; IS 339
- Website: teachtoone.org

Teach to One, previously known as School of One (SO1), is a middle school mathematics program of the New York City Department of Education . It began in 2009 and is currently operating in six schools in Manhattan, The Bronx, and Brooklyn. Its innovative program integrates the use of technology in the development and implementation of personalized curriculum and learning as well as the use of technology in the learning environment.

== Educational approach ==
The program is based on each student's individual learning requirements, also called learner-based-learning or student-centred learning. The approach is to provide students with their own Personal Learning Environment. In traditional learning environments, teachers lead students through the curriculum such that each student is expected to learn the same material at the same time. At Teach to One, each student is provided a blended learning environment geared towards their individual learning needs. These are identified by State assessments and test results and are then used to create a student's “playlist,” or Individual Learning Plan. Each student receives a daily schedule based on their own learning needs and strengths, with each schedule and instruction plan adjusted to suit their ability. Teachers can acquire real-time data on each student's achievement and adjust their live instruction to suit, usually daily. Teach to One focuses on learning progression, but depending on pre-identified skills of the students, each student might begin the same lesson at a different point. Each student participates in multiple instructional methods, including teacher-led instruction, small group collaboration, individual tutoring, independent learning, work with online tutors, or any combination thereof.

The classrooms at Teach to One are centered around an open space with multiple learning stations. These stations provide the lessons selected by the curriculum software as well as connecting students with a teacher, software, and online tutors. This allows the student to work independently or in collaboration with other online students, either individually or in groups. The student-teacher ratio is 10, significantly lower than in most programs.

== Technology ==
Teach to One uses digital technology to develop individualized, daily-adjusted student curricula which the students access via an online portal. A computer-based Machine Learning algorithm collects data to generate a daily lesson plan or "playlist" for each student based on what is determined to best meet their learning needs. It functions as an adaptive scheduler to ensure each student is learning in his or her educational "sweet spot." As it collects data, the algorithm generates a daily lesson plan and schedule for each student and teacher by analyzing factors including each student's academic history and profile, assessment of previous work sessions, as well as the school's available resources, space, and staffing. Teachers can review and suggest changes to the algorithm's daily lesson recommendations to provide additional pedagogical direction, input and feedback.

== Schools ==
As of 2011, the Teach to One program serves approximately 2,300 students in six schools:

- IS 228 David A. Boody Intermediate School, Gravesend, Brooklyn; (commenced with in-school pilot program, February 2010)
- J.H.S. 088 Peter Rouget
- I.S. 381
- I.S. 2 George L. Egbert
- I.S. 49 Berta A. Dreyfus
- I.S. 286 Renaissance Leadership Academy

== History ==
The program was developed out of a concern about the success of traditional curricula. Their perceived inflexibility prompted Teach to One founding CEO Joel Rose to imagine a program that offered students an individual learning experience. “In a traditional classroom, we know that when a teacher may be teaching, not every student is ready to learn,” said Rose.

The design for Teach to One came about from an analysis of the suitability of traditional classroom models which are based on a 19th-century study. A design charrette was held in 2009 with educators, administrators, and architects. Key results from the charrette:

- The student is a key stakeholder. The effectiveness of the School of One will depend on the end-user's experience.
- Different learning modalities require different spaces.
- Flexible spaces with reconfigurable furnishings can alleviate the need for additional square footage.
- Data on the user experience will inform the link between motivation and design of the learning environment.
- Technology is a pathway, not an end result. Delivery mechanisms constantly evolve and replace earlier models.
- Design is a change agent. The design process can help solve problems holistically.

The physical result was a design with different sized spaces, many smaller than traditional classrooms, with movable furniture offering flexible learning environments that can be adapted to different uses. There were fewer walls separating learning spaces, resulting in a more open plan plan. Acoustical separation was found to not be a major concern due to the students' being more actively engaged by their personalized learning. Each student begins their day in a central gathering space with monitors similar to those in airport terminals directing students to their workstations. Students then proceed to spaces where they will be working in large groups, small groups, or individually using laptop computers or PDAs.

Following the charrette a $1million pilot program was enacted in the summer of 2009. A second pilot program was established in a school in 2010. Funding has been received from approximately 30 entities outside of the NYC DOE, including $5million in stimulus money from the federal government, $500,000 from the Bill & Melinda Gates Foundation through a grant to PBS to provide digital learning materials, and Cisco Systems.

In 2011, founding CEO Joel Rose, founded a nonprofit organization called New Classrooms Innovation Partners to scale the Teach to One instructional model.

== Performance ==
Teach to One (then called School of One) has been heralded as one of the "100 Best Innovations of 2009" by Time magazine, and the "future of education" by the former president of Teachers College, Columbia University.

In 2011 the progress of students participating in the program in the summer of 2010 was independently assessed by the Education Development Center's Center for Children and Technology. These students were found to have an average increase in the number of test items answered correctly compared to pre-program test scores. The 2010 pilot was evaluated by New York City Department of Education's Research and Policy Study Group who found that participating students significantly outperformed non-participating students, even after considering factors such as participants spending more time in the learning environment. Teach to One has received funding from the federal government's Investing in Innovation (i3) program to further study the effectiveness of its implementation into schools.

According to an independent analysis of Teach to One: Math model by the Center for Technology and School Change at Teachers College, Columbia University, students gained almost 1.2 years of growth in math or nearly 20% more than the national average in the 2012–13 school year.

In a study of the second full program year of Teach to One, Professor Doug Ready of Teacher's College, Columbia University found that, on average, students made math gains at 1.5 times the national average.
