= Writing circle =

Support group of like-minded writers

A writing circle is a group of like-minded writers needing support for their work, either through writing peer critiques, workshops or classes, or just encouragement. There are many different types of writing circles or writing groups based on location, style of writing, or format. Normally, the goal of a writing circle is to improve one's own craft by listening to the works and suggestions of others in the group. It also builds a sense of community and allows new writers to become accustomed to sharing their work. Writing circles can be helpful inside and outside the classroom.

== Function ==
A writing circle brings writers from different walks of life together in one place to discuss their work in a workshop-style setting. Writers will be able to give feedback and hear suggestions from fellow writers. It can build community in a classroom and help students gain public speaking skills. This workshop method could be used for any genre of writing (creative prose, poetry, etc.).

Writing circles can build a sense of community and help writers become more confident in their own work. They teach writers how to give and receive constructive criticism, enable them to learn from one another's mistakes and successes, and let them appreciate different opinions and views. In some cases, writing circles can be used as a form of group therapy (writing for healing).

== List of notable writing circles ==
=== Online ===
- Youwriteon
- The Pen Factor

=== United Kingdom ===
- Norwich Writers' Circle
- Oxford University Poetry Society
- Mitzi Szereto's workshop for Erotic fiction is held in various locations in the UK throughout the year.

=== United States ===
- Clarion Workshop
- Milford Writer's Workshop
- The Turkey City Writer's Workshop
- The Wordos Writer's Workshop
- Algonkian Writers Conference
- Sycamore Hill Writer's Workshop
- Iowa Writers' Workshop

=== India ===
- First Draft Club

== See also ==
- Edit-a-thon – collaborative Wikipedia editing events
- Writers workshop
