= Learning relationship management =

Educational progress tracking system

A learning relationship management (LRM) software system manages and facilitates student-led instruction to maximize student engagement, achievement, outcome and long-term success (allows learners to assemble and manage their own sociotechnical system). Unlike learning management systems (LMS) in which elements are organized around specific courses, LRMs are student-centric in design, facilitate personalized learning, and provide individualized learning paths, a central point for analytics data and a way of tracking interventions and related results. The LRM system provides a comprehensive foundation for end-to-end student support", which may include communication with and/or support from a learner network consisting of educators, administrators, parents/guardians, mentors, advisors/guidance counselors, etc.

Examples of LRMs include Fidelis Education, Epiphany Learning, Project Foundry, MyLC, Fishtree, and Motivis Learning.
