= RTTP =

RTTP may refer to:

== Technology ==
- Real-time Transport Protocol, an Internet protocol

== Entertainment ==
- Return to the Pit, a radio show

== Education ==
- Reacting to the Past, a prototype that led to other historical role-playing games

== Research ==
- Registered Technology Transfer Professional, international standard to credit the competence and experience of those professionals who develop their careers in the field of knowledge and technology transfer, in the academic sector or in industry.
