= Hazel Grove High School =

Location
- Jacksons Lane, Hazel Grove; Stockport, Greater Manchester, SK7 5JX; England; 53.3699°N 2.1358°W

Information
- Type: Academy
- Local authority: Stockport Metropolitan Borough Council
- Trust: The Laurus Trust
- Department for Education URN: 137923 Tables
- Ofsted: Reports
- Head of school: Emma Moroney
- Executive headteacher: Martin Vevers
- Gender: Mixed
- Age range: 11–18
- Enrolment: 1,414 (2019)
- Capacity: 1,350
- Colours: Maroon and White
- Website: www.hazelgrovehigh.co.uk

Hazel Grove High School (HGHS) is an 11–18 mixed secondary school and sixth form with academy status located on Jacksons Lane in Hazel Grove, Stockport, Greater Manchester, England.

Originally, built in the 1950s and 60s as separate boys and girls schools, Hazel Grove High School became a mixed-sex comprehensive school in the 1970s. It has had varying Ofsted reports, with four "Good' ratings, two "Satisfactory" ratings and one "Requires Improvement", in 2018. Its best-known alumni is Sarah Harding of pop band Girls Aloud.

== History ==
Hazel Grove High School was created in 1953 as part of the post war expansion of secondary education. It was initially an all-boys school, with an all-girls school being built next to it in 1961. The two schools were combined into a single comprehensive school in 1973.

=== A II Z ===
In 1980, the band A II Z, briefly nationally popular as part of the new wave of British heavy metal, played a gig at Hazel Grove High School that was recorded by their label Polydor Records and released as The Witch of Berkley.

=== Conversion to academy ===
The school became an academy in 2012.

In 2016, Hazel Grove High School had the third best results at GCSE for state schools in Stockport after Cheadle Hulme High School and St James' Catholic High School.

After receiving a "Requires Improvement" Ofsted rating in 2018, the school joined The Laurus Trust in September 2019.

=== 2020-2023 closure of sixth-form ===
In 2020, the Hazel Grove High School Sixth Form was closed temporarily while facilities were refurbished. It reopened in October 2023.

=== 2025 bullying incidents ===
In February 2025 the school claimed that they were dealing robustly with a fight between pupils that was caught on video.

In March 2025 an autistic pupil was pulled out of the school by his parents after two years of bullying. The boy was later sent messages of support by Luke Humphries and Manchester City players.

Later in the month it emerged that eighteen individuals in the past two years had filed complaints with local MPs Lisa Smart and Tom Morrison over bullying at the school.

== Governance and leadership ==
The school is part of The Laurus Trust, a Multi-academy trust operating over 10 schools across the Greater Manchester area,, which it formally joined in September 2019. The Trust provides strategic leadership, operational support, and access to shared resources across a network of schools in Greater Manchester.

The Head of School at Hazel Grove High School is Emma Moroney, who is responsible for the day-to-day management of the school, implementation of the curriculum, and student outcomes. She works alongside the Executive Head, Martin Vevers, who has a role in several Laurus Trust schools.

== OFSTED reports ==
The school has had multiple Ofsted inspections:

- 2004: Rated "Good"
- 2007: Rated "Satisfactory" (Note: Prior to September 2012, a score of 3 indicated "Satisfactory", after 2012 it indicated "Requires Improvement".)
- 2011: Rated "Satisfactory"
- 2013: Rated "Good"
- 2014: Rated "Good"
- 2018: Rated “Requires Improvement”
- 2022: Rated "Good"
- 2026: Rated "Strong" in inclusion, leadership and governance, personal development and wellbeing, and post-16 provision, and "Expected Standard" in achievement, attendance and behaviour, and curriculum and teaching. (Note: Ofsted reports no longer give an overall rating.)

== Sport ==
The school is home to the Hazel Grove Sports Centre which is utilised by the public outside of school hours.

== Notable alumni ==
- Sarah Harding, singer-songwriter, dancer, model and actress
- Steve Penk, radio and television presenter
- Tim Scott, instrumental recording artist
- Graeme Shimmin, novelist and blogger
- Jon Willis, professional fencer
- Jon Hallworth, professional footballer
