= Publisher's reader =

A publisher's reader or first reader is a person paid by a publisher or book sales club to read manuscripts from the slush pile, and to advise their employers as to quality and marketability of the work. In the US, most publishers use a full-time employee for this, if they do it at all. That employee is called an editorial assistant.

Most publishers in the US prefer to receive some type of shorter query, decide if the subject and author fit their current plans, and then request a copy of the manuscript. When a writer ignores this request or guideline, and sends a full manuscript, many publishers return them unopened. These publishers, then, would not have anyone "reading slush."

The first person to read the submissions can exercise considerable influence over the offerings of the publishers for whom they work, and many unknown writers owed their first sale to a sympathetic publishers' reader or editorial assistant. A film reader performs a similar task by reading screenplays and advising producers and directors of their viability as a potential critical and commercial success.
