= Reacting games =

Educational historical role-playing games

Reacting games are educational role-playing games set in the past, with a focus on student debates about great texts.

== History ==
Reacting games developed as a genre of experiential education games in the United States in the late 1990s from work done by Mark Carnes at Barnard College. The prototype for these games is the Reacting to the Past series originally published by Pearson-Longman and currently published by the University of North Carolina Press]. This pedagogy was originally developed for use in freshman seminar and history classes and quickly expanded into religion, political science, and science. Unlike the video games that are central to the serious games movement, reacting games rely almost entirely on reading, writing, and speaking. This quality of the games has made them effective for developing academic literacy, noted by the use of the games for English language education in Japan. The dissemination of this pedagogy has largely been through annual national conferences held at Barnard College and regional conferences held at institutions throughout the United States.

== Attributes ==
Reacting games have the following attributes:

- Real historical setting
- Rich texts
- Multiple class meetings
- Roles with well-developed characters
- Victory objectives
- Indeterminacy
- Reading, writing, and speaking
- Narrative structure with drama
- Possibility of alternate historical outcomes
- Accessibility to non-specialists

Reacting games might also include the following common elements:

- Factions
- Elements of secrecy
- Opening vignettes
- Central texts

A growing number of reacting games also make use of in-game currency or Personal Interest Points (PIPs).

== Game length ==
The earliest reacting games all centered around a single, classic text and were played during half or a third of a semester. As the format of reacting games evolved, the requirement for a classic text was dropped and shorter games emerged. At present, reacting games fall into the following categories:

Full games consist of 1-3 sessions of setup, 5-8 sessions of game-play, and 1-2 sessions for debriefing.

Short games consist of 1 session of setup, 2-3 sessions of game-play, and one session for debriefing. Many of these games are designed to replace a single textbook chapter and typically span a week of class.

Microgames consist of a single session of game-play, but usually require some setup and debriefing in the preceding and subsequent class sessions. A grant from the National Science Foundation launched a dozen new game prototypes with a shorter format. These are useful for conference workshops or for first-time players. They are meant to introduce the game format as much as they are to teach the content.

== Relationship to other games and simulations ==
=== Case studies ===
Case studies have long been used in the medical, business, and legal education. They might involve discussion, debate, problem-based learning, or role-play. By contrast, reacting games require debate and role-play. Unlike case studies, reacting games also must be set in a true historical setting.

=== Live action role-playing ===
A live action role-playing games (LARP) has participants assuming roles and playing them out in costume. While reacting games do indeed have students playing historical roles, this rarely involves costumes. Reacting games are used for education while LARP is primarily used for recreation. In addition, while LARPs usually include a fantasy element, reacting games are historical.

=== Educational debating ===
In educational debate (or debate team), students competitively debate a topic following explicit rules. While educational debate involves only two teams ("for" and "against"), reacting games can involve multiple teams, including an undecided, indeterminate set of players. Educational debate also involves no role-playing and is not set in a historical setting. In addition, while debates focus on a single issue, reacting games feature multiple intellectual collisions, which necessitates shifting coalitions of players. Thus, those that are "for" and "against" change with each successive issue.

=== Model United Nations ===
While reacting games and Model United Nations have many similarities (e.g. educational usage, roles, factions, voting) Model UN simulations frequently focus on a fictional, rather than a historical scenario.

=== Historical simulation games ===
Historical simulation games are designed to model historical events. Both tabletop and electronic forms can be used in classes with the intent to challenge students to work through difficult scenarios and explore possible alternate historical outcomes. Reacting games may contain components of historical simulation games including random events and alternate historical outcomes, however, they are more typically focused around the clash of ideas and people than the direct modeling of military or historical events.

=== Economics simulation games ===
Economic simulations are commonly used in economics courses to model the outcomes of decisions made by groups of students in competition. Reacting games may include aspects of economic simulations: for example, the acid rain and the European environment game incorporates pollution credit trading as a primary game mechanism.

== Assessment ==
Psychological studies of students participating in reacting games have shown students to gain an "elevated self-esteem and empathy, a more external locus of control, and greater endorsement of the belief that human characteristics are malleable compared with controls." Additional assessments are being conducted to gauge science content learning in some reacting games. Studies of reacting games played online (rather than face-to-face) show similar learning gains but lower student satisfaction.

There has been little critique for the time being of reacting games. While there has been a great deal of enthusiasm for the methodology, much of that is in opposition to traditional lectures. Some students prefer a game format to traditional lecturing, but not all. The question of learning style as well as the oft-neglected teaching style should be taken into account. In the past, new methodologies have frequently been met with great enthusiasm initially, only to eventually confront realities of the classroom learning environment. The games do not lend themselves to all course material. Also, if students are exposed to too many games, it is likely there would be a "boredom" effect, perhaps as strong – if not even stronger – than that which may exist for some students to traditional lecture courses.

In September 2019, the Chronicle of Higher Education published a profile of Reacting to the Past, discussing its popularity as well as the debate surrounding the "idiosyncratic" pedagogy.

== Published Reacting games ==
Reacting games are published by the University of North Carolina Press.

As of November 2019, the following is a complete list of all published Reacting games:

- Building the Italian Renaissance: Brunelleschi's Dome and the Florence Cathedral
- Changing the Game: Title IX, Gender, and College Athletics
- Charles Darwin, the Copley Medal, and the Rise of Naturalism, 1861-1864
- Confucianism and the Succession Crisis of the Wanli Emperor, 1587
- Constantine and the Council of Nicaea: Defining Orthodoxy and Heresy in Christianity, 325 CE
- Defining a Nation: India on the Eve of Independence, 1945
- Environmental Science and International Politics: Acid Rain in Europe, 1979-1989, and Climate Change in Copenhagen, 2009
- Europe on the Brink, 1914: The July Crisis
- Forest Diplomacy: Cultures in Conflict on the Pennsylvania Frontier, 1757
- Frederick Douglass, Slavery, and the Constitution, 1845
- Greenwich Village, 1913: Suffrage, Labor, and the New Woman
- Henry VIII and the Reformation Parliament
- Kentucky, 1861: Loyalty, State, and Nation
- Mexico in Revolution, 1912-1920
- Modernism versus Traditionalism: Art in Paris, 1888-1889
- Patriots, Loyalists, and Revolution in New York City, 1775-1776
- Red Clay, 1835: Cherokee Removal and the Meaning of Sovereignty
- Restoring the World, 1945: Security and Empire at Yalta
- Rousseau, Burke, and Revolution in France, 1791
- The Collapse of Apartheid and the Dawn of Democracy in South Africa, 1993
- The Constitutional Convention of 1787: Constructing the American Republic
- The Needs of Others: Human Rights, International Organizations, and Intervention in Rwanda, 1994
- The Threshold of Democracy: Athens in 403 B.C. (by Josiah Ober and Mark C. Carnes)
- The Trial of Anne Hutchinson: Liberty, Law, and Intolerance in Puritan New England
- The Trial of Galileo: Aristotelianism, the "New Cosmology," and the Catholic Church, 1616-1633

== BLORG ==
Scholars at many universities around the world write Reacting games. The Reacting Consortium maintains a Big List of Reacting Games (BLORG), listing many dozens of unpublished Reacting games according to five levels of development:

- Level One: Concept (no playable prototype)
- Level Two: Basic Prototype
- Level Three: Complete Prototype
- Level Four: Approved for Publication
- Level Five: Published

== Notes and references ==
Notes
