= Michael A. Fitzgerald =

American author and entrepreneur (1970–2023)

- Born: 1970; Rochester, Minnesota, U.S.
- Died: September 4, 2023 (aged 53)
- Occupations: Entrepreneur, Author

Michael A. Fitzgerald (1970 – September 4, 2023) was an American entrepreneur and author.

== Life and career ==
Fitzgerald was raised in Skaneteles, NY. He graduated from Hobart College and the University of Montana. At the time of his death he was living in Missoula, MT.

Fitzgerald's novel, Radiant Days, was published in 2007 by Shoemaker and Hoard (now Counterpoint).

Fitzgerald was the founder of Submittable, Inc, which is located in Missoula, MT. Submittable, the company that Fitzgerald founded, is a major tech employer in Missoula, MT, and has been named by Inc. Magazine as one of the 5,000 fastest growing companies.
