= Fishtree =

Fishtree Inc.
- Company type: Private company
- Industry: Educational technology
- Founded: 2012
- Founders: Terry Nealon (CEO); Jim Butler (CTO)
- Headquarters: Arlington, VA
- Area served: Worldwide
- Products: Fishtree
- Website: www.fishtree.com

Fishtree Inc. is an Educational Technology Company that provides a personalized learning platform for K–12 and Higher education. As of March 2015, the Fishtree platform is being used by nearly 500,000 users worldwide in multiple languages including English, Spanish, and Mandarin.

== History ==
In 2012, Fishtree Inc. was founded by CEO Terry Nealon and CTO Jim Butler. In 2015, the company announced it had raised $3 million (€2.7 million) in venture capital funding to expand in the U.S. education marketplace. Investors in the company include New Markets Venture Partners in Fulton, Maryland; Recruit (company) based in Chiyoda, Tokyo; and JISR Venture Partners in Dubai.

In 2016, Fishtree Inc. partnered with Blackboard Inc. and other educational technology providers to integrate the former's personalized learning technology with Learning management system platforms used by instructors at K-12 and postsecondary institutions.

The company also announced a deal with Jefferson Education, which included a financial investment and collaboration, that would help expand its research and data-gathering capabilities to improve the Fishtree platform.

== Products ==
=== The Fishtree Platform ===
Fishtree is an Adaptive learning platform designed to support a Competency-based learning model. Teachers and school administrators use Fishtree to automate curriculum planning and management tasks, such as authoring lessons and courses, recording grades, finding teaching resources, personalized learning, and tracking student trends.

Its web-based software uses Machine learning to collect and assess relevant and personalized Learning analytics in real time as the student engages with course content, and then assign differentiated instruction based on the student's needs. It is also notable that Fishtree provides access to Open educational resources for teachers to use in the classroom.

== Awards ==
In 2014, Fishtree won the Software and Information Industry Association NextGen Most Disruptive and Overall Mobile Award.
