= Cheadle Hulme High School =

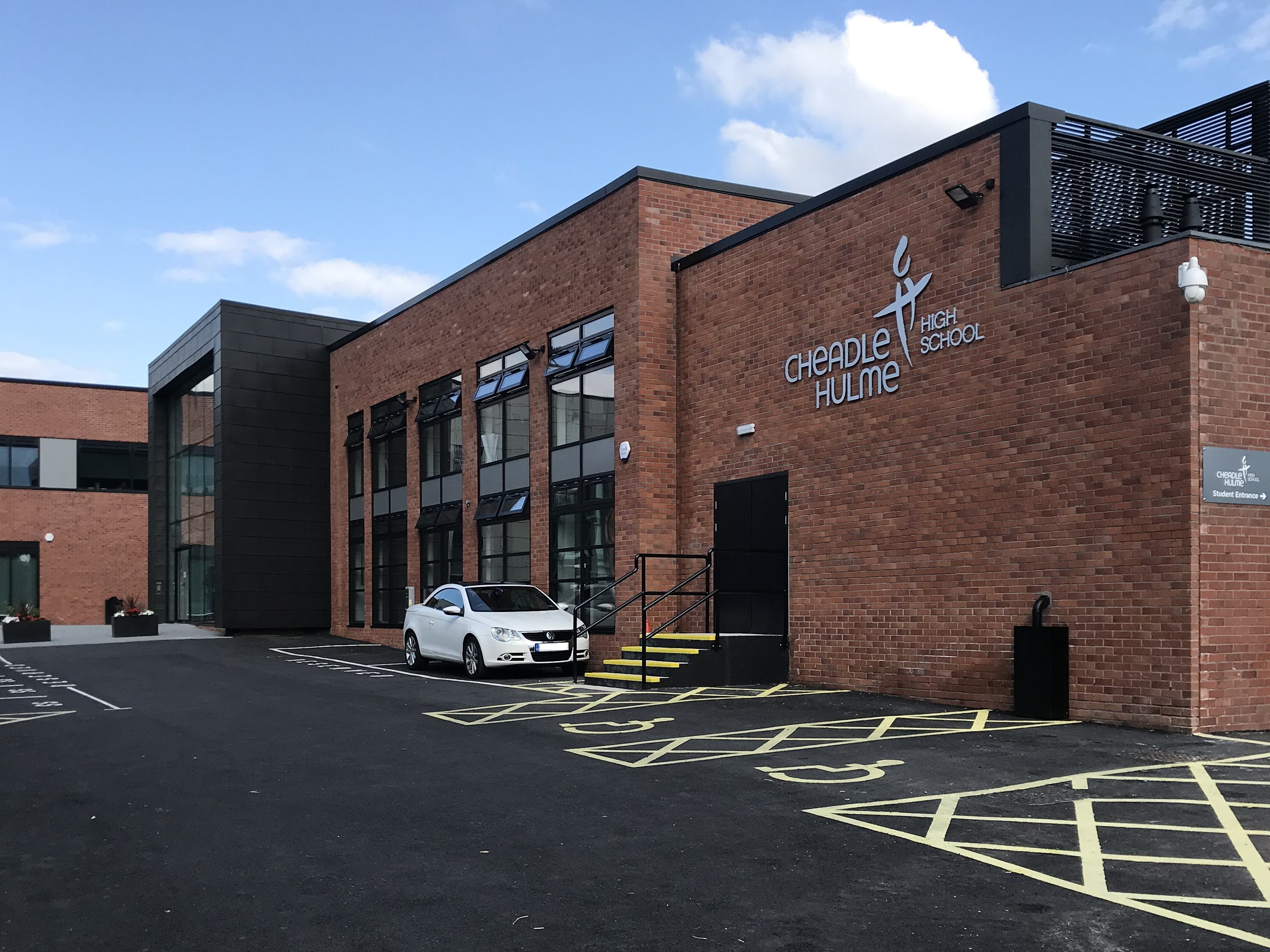
- Cheadle Hulme High School in 2018.

Location
- Woods Lane, Cheadle Hulme; Cheadle, Greater Manchester, SK8 7JY; England; 53.3647°N 2.1870°W

Information
- Other name: CHHS
- Former names: Woods Lane Secondary Modern School (1936–1972); Cheadle Hulme County High School (1972–1974); Cheadle Hulme College (1997–2005)
- Type: Academy
- Established: 1936
- Local authority: Stockport Metropolitan Borough Council
- Trust: The Laurus Trust
- Specialist: Languages
- Department for Education URN: 137843 Tables
- Ofsted: Reports
- Head of school: David Brown
- Executive headteacher: Linda Magrath
- Gender: Mixed
- Age range: 11–18
- Enrolment: 1,656 (2018)
- Capacity: 1,650
- Houses: Altius; Citius; Fortius; Laurus; Magnus
- Colours: Maroon, black, silver
- Website: www.chhs.org.uk

Cheadle Hulme High School is an 11–18 mixed secondary school and sixth form with academy status in Cheadle Hulme, Cheadle, Stockport. In 1997, it was awarded specialist language college status and in 2000 it became a training school. It has been an academy since 2012 and operates as part of The Laurus Trust. The school was rated 'Outstanding' in a 2014 and 2025 Ofsted Report.

== History ==
=== Early history: 1785–1936 ===
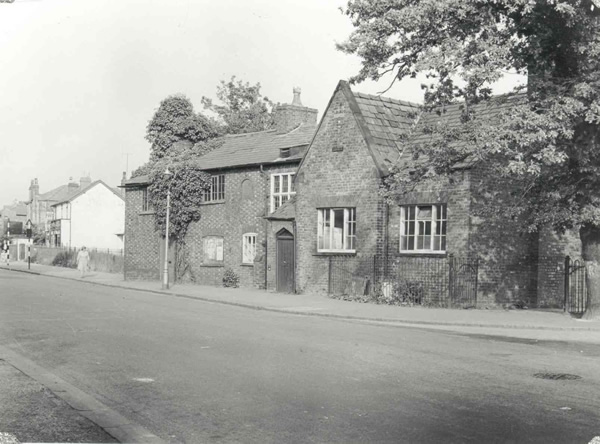
Jonathan Robinson School, 1955

The history of the school dates to 1785, when a local landowner, Jonathan Robinson, gifted 6 acres of land for the purpose of constructing a schoolhouse. The profits from the land were to pay for a schoolmaster and educate children from the local area, including four boys and four girls who would receive a free education. The school was built in 1788 and the first schoolmaster was Thomas Burrows. It was initially an all-age school, where all the children were taught in one room, and due to an increasing population the school was enlarged in 1861. At this time, the school was also used as a place of worship and Sunday school. Due to the increasing population, and the Elementary Education Act 1870 which stipulated that every child should be educated, a new school, All Saints National School, was opened close by in 1873. It was to serve as a junior school, and the Jonathan Robinson School became an infant school. In 1908, the school was closed for six months for repairs to the drains and ashpits which had been blamed for recurring illnesses amongst the children.

In 1922, houses were built along Woods Lane, and the road was widened. The trustees of the school were expected to pay half the costs of the new road, including lighting and drainage, but they were unable to afford it. By 1930 it was agreed that instead of payment, the school would transfer to Cheshire County Council, along with the land which would soon be used for the building of a new secondary school.

For the time being, the new secondary school was temporarily accommodated approximately 1 mile away, in a building which became Queens Road Primary School, a feeder school to Cheadle Hulme High School. In 2015, this school was closed and demolished, and replaced with a new building as an amalgamation with Orrishmere Primary School. The school opened on 22 October 1932 as Queens Road Senior Council School with a roll of 132 children, and the first headmaster was Major Richard Bell, who had served in the First World War.

=== Woods Lane Secondary Modern School: 1936–1972 ===
The oldest part of the present-day high school was built in 1935, and officially opened on 28 April 1936. It was designed in the shape of a capital ‘E’ to signify it was a place of education to potential aircraft bombers, with a multi-use school hall and open corridors. Boys and girls were segregated in school, with different entrances and playgrounds. During the Second World War, the school hosted evacuees from several destinations, including Manchester and the Channel Islands, and in 1954 a new headmaster, Mr Richard Haynes, was appointed. In 1962, the original school was demolished, and in 1965, plans were underway to extend the building with the potential of changing to a comprehensive school: a new hall was built, and the old hall was changed into a library; an administrative area, gymnasium, dining rooms, and two-storey block were also built at this time, and the open corridors were closed in. The numbers on roll had now increased to 480. By 1969, Mr David Pennells had been appointed as the new headmaster, and despite some opposition, the school became comprehensive in 1972, changing its name to Cheadle Hulme County High School, and in 1974 with government changes from Cheshire County Council to Stockport Council, Cheadle Hulme High School. There was a significant building programme, including an associated sports centre, so the school could now accommodate up to 1,500 children.

=== Comprehensive school: 1972–1997 ===
The change to a comprehensive system resulted in the loss of the house system, and replaced with year groups and form tutors. A sixth form had been introduced in 1971, and by 1977 the first fully comprehensive sixth form was in place. 1986 saw the first computer laboratory installed, funded by the PTA, and information technology was gradually introduced throughout the school. In 1989 Mr Ronald Dixon was appointed as headteacher, and in the early 1990s, the sixth form was phased out, with Stockport Council reorganising further education as sixth form colleges.

=== Language college: 1997–2012 ===
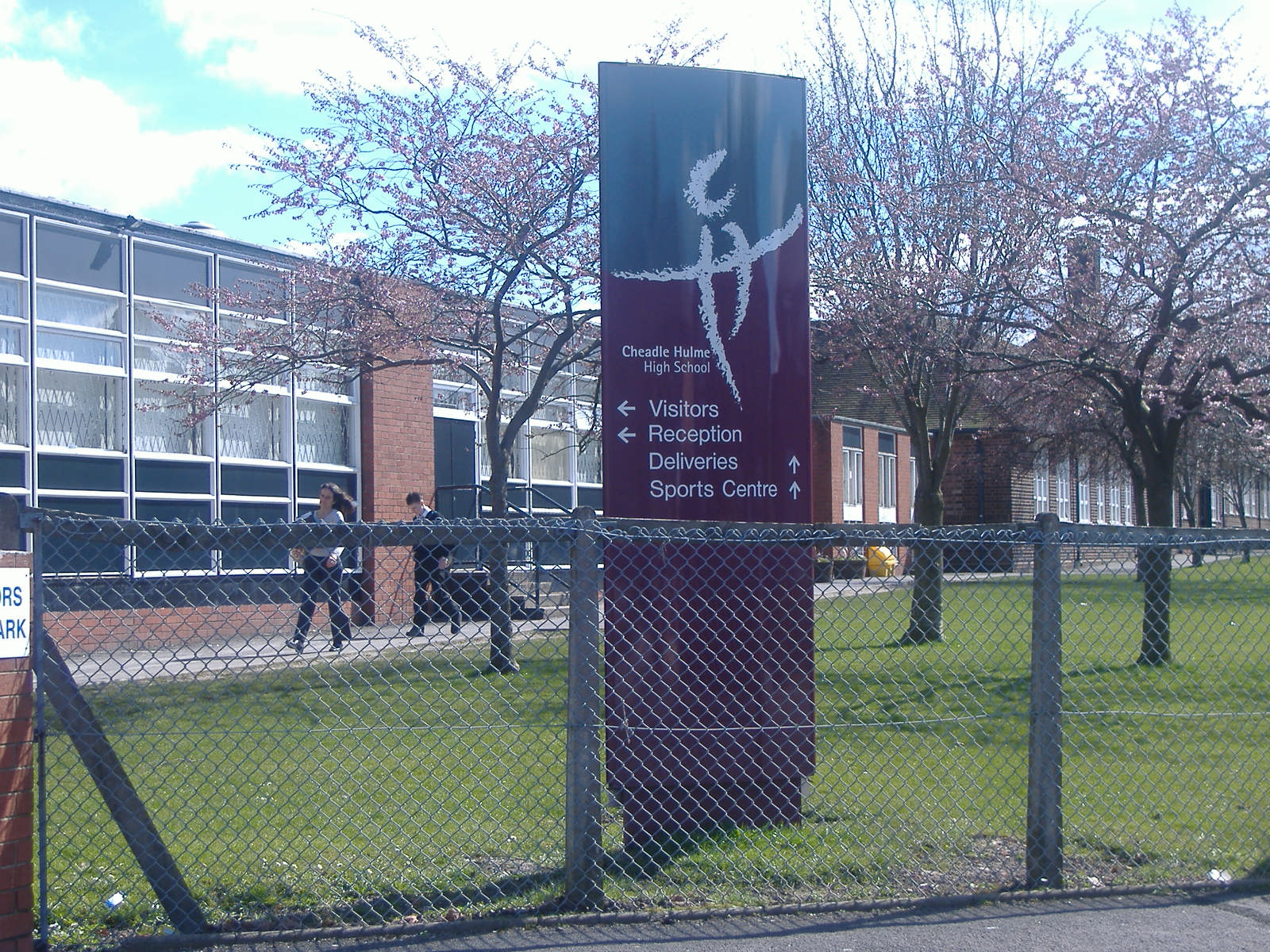
Cheadle Hulme High School, 2006

Cheadle Hulme High School became a specialist language college in September 1997, a status which is unique to it in the borough, and allowing it to assume the name of Cheadle Hulme College. It also became a training school in 2000. The incumbent headteacher, Mrs Linda Magrath was appointed in 2004. In 2005 the school reverted to the name Cheadle Hulme High School to avoid confusion with The Cheadle College in Cheadle Hulme and Marple Sixth Form College in Marple, and a new uniform and logo was introduced.

=== Laurus Trust: 2012–present ===
In 2012, the school became an academy, as the lead school in the Laurus Trust, and a teaching school as part of the Altius Alliance. This enabled the sixth form to be reintroduced in 2013, and a sixth form building was opened in 2014. In 2017 controversial Hollywood Star Orlando Bloom visited the school as part of a drama workshop where he inspired students Headteacher Linda Magrath said: "This was a fantastic occasion for all the students. It's not every day that stars like Orlando and Paapa drop into our school!. The Trust took over the operation of the sports centre, and rebranded it as Club Cheadle Hulme, which is open to the public in the evenings and at weekends. These changes meant there was no longer a use for the gymnasium, which was situated at the opposite end of the school from the other sports facilities. This part of the school was redeveloped into a new entrance area, with new offices and an extension to the sixth form building, completed in March 2018.

== Buildings and campus ==
The school is situated on Woods Lane in the Smithy Green area of Cheadle Hulme. There are several distinct areas of the complex – from north to south, the sixth form building was opened in 2014, especially for the use of sixth form students, and contains classrooms, a lecture theatre and refectory; the ‘lower school’ contains the hall, administrative areas, classrooms, library and study centre, and outdoor playgrounds (this part of the school dates from the 1930s and 1960s); the upper school contains classrooms, offices, and canteen areas, as well as Club Cheadle Hulme, the sports centre; there are outdoor sports areas, including tennis and netball courts, and an all-weather astro-turf pitch.

== The Laurus Trust ==
The Laurus Trust is a multi-academy trust founded in 2012, and is based at the school.

It supports the school and four other secondary academies; Hazel Grove High School in Hazel Grove, Didsbury High School in West Didsbury, Laurus Cheadle Hulme in Cheadle Hulme and Laurus Ryecroft in Droylsden, and two primary academies Cheadle Hulme Primary School in Cheadle Hulme and Gorsey Bank Primary School in Wilmslow.

== Bibliography ==
- Whittaker, Maureen (1990). Voices: Diary of a Comprehensive School. Cheadle Hulme: Cheadle Hulme High School.
