= Graeme Shimmin =

British science fiction novelist (1967-)

- Born: 24 September 1967 (age 58); Manchester, United Kingdom
- Occupation: Writer
- Writing career
- Period: (2013–present)
- Genre: Science fiction/Alternate history
- Website: graemeshimmin.com

Graeme John Shimmin (born 24 September 1967), is a British science-fiction novelist and blogger.

== Early life ==
Shimmin was born in Manchester, UK. He attended Hazel Grove High School and studied Physics at Durham University before working in IT for fifteen years. He then completed a Creative Writing MA at Manchester Metropolitan University.

== Career ==
Shimmin has released one novel through Transworld Publishers - A Kill in the Morning, an alternate history/sci-fi thriller set in a 1955 alternate Britain and Europe after the death of Winston Churchill in 1941. The novel received mixed reviews from Booklist, Publishers Weekly, SFX Magazine and Interzone, and Stephen Baxter endorsed it as "A terrific debut".

The novel, which Shimmin started whilst doing an MA at Manchester Metropolitan University, was shortlisted for the Terry Pratchett First Novel Award in 2013 and won the YouWriteOn Book of the Year 2013.

In 2014, Shimmin's blog was shortlisted for the Blog North Awards, which are part of the Manchester Literature Festival, in the Arts and Culture section He has also had articles re-posted on Huffington Post, Forbes, and Slate.

== Influences ==
Shimmin has said that his influences include Robert Harris, Alistair MacLean, and Len Deighton. Maxim Jakubowski has described Shimmin's influences as Ian Fleming, and Geoffrey Household.

== Bibliography ==
- A Kill in the Morning (June 2014 – ISBN 978 0 59307 353 7 [UK], Transworld)
