= Learning plan =

Document to plan learning

A learning plan is a term to describe a document (possibly electronic or interactive) that is used for learning development over a period of time.

Any entity can have a learning plan. They are often used by individuals to plan and manage their own learning, but they can also be used by teams, communities of practice or organizations. An organizational level plan can be the aggregate of its individuals plans or it can add information on the emergent learning needs of the overall organization.

The active development and maintenance of a learning plan can enrich a person's life and the sharing of learning plans can help to strengthen a community.

== Components of a learning plan ==
A good learning plan is a well articulated document with the following components:

A set of 'learning goals' that the person (or organization) hopes to achieve within a specific period of time. It is often useful to divide larger goals into more manageable sub-goals that can be realized within weeks or months.

Each learning goal (or sub goal) should have a series of concrete steps or actions that the person will take to move towards the goal. Actions should be actual behaviors. Writing a quality article for Wikipedia is an example of an action. Or, if the learning goal is "understand Indian cooking", preparing and serving a masala to a group of East Indian friends might be an appropriate action.

Each action should be associated with one or more resources and with evidence.

Resources are anything that can be used to realize the actions to be taken towards the learning goal. One of the best resources is a mentor or coach, but there are many others, including books, courses, travel, the Internet and especially Wikipedia. Once a resource has been applied to a goal it is often helpful to rate the effectiveness of the resource, especially in cases where the learning plan will be shared.

Evidence is used to demonstrate that an action has been taken, that progress towards the goal has been made, and finally that the goal has been achieved. Evidence can be private, when the person does not need to demonstrate to other people that the goal has been achieved, or public, when evidence is required.

== Modes of learning ==
A learning plan can be used for many modes of learning. One taxonomy is as follows:

- Culture - learning about one's own or other people's cultures
- Financial - learning how to manage money and how money works in the economy
- Physical - physical fitness can be a form of learning and a learning plan can be used to improve and track a person's fitness
- Political (Citizen) - learning more about one's polity and the rights and duties of citizenship
- Relationship - things that one wants to learn about people in key relationships, and how to be more effective in relationships
- Spiritual - deepening one's understanding of the spiritual dimension of life; a prayer or meditation journal can be part of a learning plan.
- Work - professional learning

A learning plan will often have parts that are strictly private, others that are only shared with one's intimates, others that are for various groups, and it may have some parts that are public.

== Learning plans, learning records, and the ePortfolio ==
As a learning plan evolves, goals are attained, evidence is collected and becomes a learning record. There has been much attention to learning records or the Electronic portfolio in recent pedagogy and andragogy. Whereas a learning plan looks forward to what is to be achieved, a learning record looks backwards to the past and what has been accomplished. Two sides of the same coin.

== Learning landscape ==
A learning landscape is a broader concept than a learning plan, placing the individual at the centre of their learning, allowing them to connect with other learners and create online communities. A learning landscape brings together the strengths of electronic portfolio and social networking. A learning landscape is usually based on an individual's interests, skills, reflection and competencies. By sharing these aspirations and thoughts other members can offer support and encouragement. Tools such as Elgg provide facilities for developing learning landscapes.

== See also ==
- Curriculum
- Electronic portfolio
- Lesson plan
