= Algonkian Writers Conference =

American creative writing organization

The Algonkian Writer Conferences organization holds several novel writing workshops at Algonkian Park, as well as other writer events throughout the year for aspiring authors in all genres. The Algonkian philosophy emphasizes a strong syllabus, narrative craft, small group workshops, market knowledge, instruction in literary dramatic technique, and critical feedback exclusively from professionals.

Algonkian began in 2002, at Algonkian Park in Virginia, part of the Potomac Heritage Trail, then grew over time to include varied events in New York, Florida, and California.

Present faculty represent a mix of publishing house editors, experienced literary agents, TV/film industry professionals, and authors. The list includes Adam Chromy, Brendan Deneen, April Osborn, Amy Stapp, Tina Wexler, Lyssa Keusch, Tom Colgan, Paula Munier, Michael Neff, Pierce Brown, Kimberley Cameron, Hallie Ephron, Susan Breen, and Kenneth Atchity, among many others.

The Algonkian flagship event, the New York Write to Pitch Conference, replaces the prior NY Pitch by adding meaningful new prose and narrative guidance to the core mix of novel and pitch development elements.
