= Peer critique =

Peer critique, a specialized form of critique, is the common practice of professional peers, especially writers, reviewing and providing constructive criticism of each other's work before that work is turned in for credit or professional review.

Writers in many genres and professions, including fiction writers and technical writers, use some form of peer critique as part of their process of writing. It is also commonly used as an instructional technique in school writing settings. Peer critique may also be referred to as peer review or a writing workshop. Writers who gather to critique each others' work are often called writing circles.

== In action ==
=== In the classroom ===
Peer critique has long been used as part of the process of teaching writing from primary school to secondary and post-secondary education. In traditional classrooms power and authority can often be teacher-centric, with teachers correcting work to their own vision of ideal writing. Many researchers have found that peer critique offers a complementary style of feedback Whereas teacher feedback may focus on general comments and error correction, peers tend to give specific, deep comments on the work before them rather than correcting to an ideal. Peer critique, furthermore, is used to help students to become better reviewers of their own work and more self-regulated learners. When working on similar assignments, this method of group learning can be used to help students understand audience reception of their work in a group of peers. In his groundbreaking 1973 book Writing without Teachers, Peter Elbow stated a powerful argument for peer-only writing classes, eliminating the teacher from the process entirely. Many informal writing groups still use Elbow's methods for peer critique.

Peer critique is said to have two primary goals: 1) to get feedback from peers in order to make revisions and edits to their papers and 2) to learn how to give feedback to peers. Related to this second goal, peer critique has been found to be useful to those who provide critiques, helping students to develop analytical and critical thinking abilities and become better able to judge their own writing. Proponents of using peer critique in the classroom say that it prepares students for lifelong learning and writing by practicing group feedback techniques they may use throughout their school years and into their professional lives.

Although widely used, there are some critiques of using peer critique in classrooms. Most of these critiques revolve around student difficulty giving meaningful feedback to their peers. Students who have little experience critiquing work may not yet have the skills to make meaningful revision suggestions on other peoples' writing. Instructors who scaffold, or provide specific models and expectations for peer review processes experience better outcomes for student learners. Students may also be uncomfortable sharing their unfinished work with their peers, prompting discussions about the writing process, rewriting, revising, and editing. Finally, students may feel that incorporating feedback from their peers makes their work less their own.

=== Outside the classroom ===
Peer writing groups have existed for a long time. Writing groups evolved over time from social "clubs" and chautauquas to the many types of groups we have today, including online peer critique sites. Hundreds of peer critique websites—some free and some paid—exist for texts written in English.

Notable historical writing groups include the following:

- The Socrates School (400 BC)
- The Bloomsbury Group (1907–1930)
- Dymock Poets (early 1900s)
- Stratford-on-Odeon (1920s)
- The “Mandarins” (1943–1952)
- The Inklings (1930s and 1940s)
- The Algonquin Roundtable (1919–1929)
- The Harlem Renaissance (1920s and 1930s)
- El Floridita (1932–1939)
- The February House (1940)
- The South Side Writers' Group (1930s and 1940s)
- The Dil Pickle Club (1917–1935)
- The Factory (1962–1984)

Current and historical face-to-face writing groups have been popular because they provide a social atmosphere where participants can brainstorm and also get feedback on their writing. Many popular historical writing circles have included artists, writers, poets, philosophers, and other social activists. Peer critique in these circles provides a social outlet, a place for ideas to germinate, and accountability for writing in progress.

=== Online ===
Anonymity adds an extra dimension to peer critique. If unstructured, anonymous reviews can result in a negative culture spiral and has led to the withdrawal of certain online critique websites. However, if structured, online reviews can provide rapid, valuable independent feedback to writers.

Some critique websites use data science to remove bias from structured review data. These sites use a simple form of artificial intelligence to identify which submissions readers are finding the most appealing.

== Methods ==
=== Face-to-face critiques ===
The most traditional form of peer critique, both inside and outside the classroom, is face-to-face. In this method, writers gather together in person and discuss each other's work in detail. In more formal writing groups members of the group might take different roles, or take turns providing their work for feedback. Face-to-face writing groups (also known as writing circles, writing groups, or workshops) can be a source of great support and encouragement for writers in what is sometimes a lonely endeavor. Providing a sense of community and accountability, they can help writers stay on track and receive the support they need to complete large projects. The greatest challenge for informal groups is keeping a face-to-face critique group together; many fall apart quickly due to lack of commitment, personality conflicts, or hurt feelings.

=== Online writing classes ===
In recent years with the advent of the Blackboard Learning System, Canvas, and similar online teaching tools (see LMS), it has become possible to take writing courses entirely online. In online courses, students generally give each other feedback on writing in message-board style posts, though some instructors may allow for anonymity in posting responses. Comments are usually brief. Teachers must beware of the "pile-on effect" of students merely echoing what teachers and previous commenters have mentioned; it will be useful for teachers to apply lessons from peer critique websites, which have functioned online for many years. Some instructors may, for example, arrange students into small synchronous groups for discussion, mitigating overwhelming feedback from the entire class.

=== Online critique sites ===
Since at least 1985, with the Compuserve Books & Writer's Forum, writers have formed writing spaces online where they can discuss writing, share resources, and critique work. There are many active critique sites now, catering to all levels and genres of writers; the popular website Reddit has a sub-reddit dedicated to writing critique, titled critique my writing., while another popular forum, www.writingforums.com, is dedicated to writing and online critique. Other peer critique sites include Youwriteon and The Pen Factor.

== Types of critique sites ==
Online peer critique sites tend to vary by:

- Charge: Some sites are free, some require membership, and some charge only for premium services
- Privacy: Sites vary on whether they are open to public view, require a password, or require approval by moderators to join
- Structure: Some sites require reviewers to give their feedback through a professionally designed framework
- Genre: There are specific critique sites for romance writers, science fiction/fantasy writers, short story writers, etc.
- Commitment: Nearly all sites generally require some time or activity commitment, but sites vary significantly on how much is required to receive critiques
- Moderation: Some sites are only lightly moderated, and some heavily; a few sites even have editors on staff who judge critiques
- Level of expertise: Some sites cater to beginners, while others have many advanced and published authors on their rosters
- Style: Many sites use general message-board formats, though some use e-mail loops for actual work
