= Terry Pratchett First Novel Award =

Literary Prize

- Awarded for: An unpublished science fiction novel in the UK
- Country: United Kingdom
- Presented by: Terry Pratchett, Transworld Publishers
- First award: 2011

The Terry Pratchett First Novel Award was a biennial award for an unpublished science fiction novel written by a UK resident. It was sponsored by British author Terry Pratchett. The winner was chosen by a panel of judges including Pratchett. The prize was a £20,000 advance against a publishing contract with Pratchett's publishers, Transworld Publishers. The award ended with Pratchett's death in 2015.

== Winners and nominees ==
=== 2011 ===
In 2011, the nominees were:

- Postponing Armageddon by Adele Abbott
- The Platinum Ticket by Dave Beynon
- Half Sick of Shadows by David Logan
- Apocalypse Cow by Michael Logan
- Lun by Andrew Salomon
- The Coven at Callington by Shereen Vedam

The award was won jointly by David Logan, for Half Sick of Shadows and Michael Logan for Apocalypse Cow.

Postponing Armageddon also went on to be published by Barking Rain Press.

=== 2013 ===
In 2013 the nominees were:

- The Unspoken Death of the Amazing Flying Boy by Jean Burdett
- Bloodline by Sophie Constable
- The Hive Construct by Alexander Maskill
- The Way Through the Woods by Robin Pearson
- A Kill in the Morning by Graeme Shimmin
- The Shadows of Annwn by Catherine Whittle

The award was won by Alexander Maskill's The Hive Construct.

A Kill in the Morning also went on to be published by Transworld.
