= Individual Learning Plan =

Teaching methodology

Individual Learning Plan or ILP is a user (student) specific program or strategy of education or learning that takes into consideration the student's strengths and weaknesses. While normal classroom or distance education is based on the premise that all should get equal attention (a democratic principle), be exposed to the same curriculum and evaluated on the same pattern ('One size fits all'), ILP presumes that the needs of individual students are different, and thus, must be differently addressed. Emphasis on the student's role in the learning experience has been shown in research to be crucial to a productive learning experience.

The Individual Learning Plan can also be used by an individual on their own or as part of a community of interest, a team or an organization to manage learning over the course of their life. This is explored further in the article "Learning Plan."

Adopted by many institutes as a teaching methodology, ILP for a student is generated after interaction between the student and the teacher, and is based upon assessment made therein. Further, ILP:

• Incorporates long-term goals of the student

• Synthesizes with the larger educational framework

• Gives credence to the student's aspirations - cultural, artistic, social, or personal

Individual Learning Plans are mandatory to complete for all students in Alaska (2010), Arizona (2008), Colorado (2010), Connecticut (2012), Delaware (2007), Georgia (2009), Hawaii (2009), Idaho (2011), Indiana (2006), Iowa (2008), Kentucky (2002), Louisiana (1998), Maryland (2008), Massachusetts (2007), Michigan (2009), Minnesota (2013), Missouri (2006), Oregon (2011), Rhode Island (2011), South Carolina (2006), South Dakota (2010), Virginia (2013), Washington (2000), West Virginia (1996), and Wisconsin (2013) in order to graduate.

== Purpose ==
The Individual Learning plan has many purposes, including:

• Discovery of many careers, beginning in the sixth grade

• Career matching making services

• Developing education plans

• Creating, maintaining and changing resumes

• Setting personal goals and keeping these insights as school progresses

• Saving and reflecting on activity including community service, work experience, career planning activities, and extracurricular activities

• Exploring colleges and postsecondary opportunities that fit with a desired career and other life goals

• Collecting personal information including assessment results, advising activities demographic information and educational history

• Keeping track of all courses taken

Also, the Individual learning plan is set to establish college and career readiness throughout middle school and high school. According to the Alliance for Excellent Education, the graduating classes were more prepared for college-level work (in all four content areas of Mathematics, Reading, English and Science) after students created/used, and ILP. On the other hand, in this same research, it was determined that nearly 16,200 students did not graduate in 2012, a fact that equates to a $4.2 billion lifetime earning loss for that class of students. This could be due to the lack of College and Career Readiness throughout states that do not implement Individual Learning Plans. The lack of college and career readiness does not only affect the student themselves, but also communities as a group. The lack of these critical skills in high school students can deny the community jobs and business due to the unfulfilled need for qualified employees.

== Functions ==
=== Career Match Maker/Career Exploration ===
The Career Exploration section offers a number of assessment tools to help you discover your skills, abilities, and learning preferences. With this it uses that information to identify suitable career options for the students using this tool. Career Cruising and Career Matchmaker can help a student better understand how interest and career choices go hand in hand, due to shared likes, skills, and interest to occupations in certain programs.

Throughout the Career Cruising there are hundreds of occupations with profiles. These profiles include interviews with people within the career, salary information, job outlook, and locations. In the employee interviews, located in the profiles of each career, they ask key questions including about their typical workday, pros and cons, and advise for students interested in pursuing that career. There are a couple ways to search for careers, including by keyword, index, school, subjects, career cluster, or career selector given to you after using Career Matchmaker.

=== College Search ===
Individual Learning Plan provides detailed school profiles for thousands of 2 and 4 year colleges, career and technical schools across the country. You can either search for particular schools/ programs, or use the School Selector to find schools that meet a variety of criteria. You can see which schools offer your chosen program, cost of enrollment, and the type of the community.

== Teacher's Point of View ==
The process of advising students is a shared responsibility that can have a significant impact on transition to postsecondary education. Teachers are required to lead, guide and direct students in setting and reaching goals. This can be done through ILP or by day-to-day contact with students. This leads to several opportunities for teachers to share college and career readiness dialogue that assists students in focusing on their futures. This also enables students and teachers to focus on one specific goal for on student, therefore the conversations are more centered around that individual student. When teachers utilize the resources in the Individual Learning Plan (ILP) during classroom instruction, students can see the relevance of the content as it relates to their plans for life after high school. This may lead students to become more motivated on reaching their goals. There are many benefits of encompassing the ILP into classroom instruction include:

• More obvious sight of direct connections between classes and future goals made for students

• More individual centered learning for each student for more successful engagement

• More motivated students and more willing to take the steps necessary to reach goals through focusing on the work and assignment, which will lead them to gain the skills and knowledge necessary for a career

• Teachers see a more direct correlation between the content they are teaching and the students’ goals for college and/or the workforce

The role of Counselors, Teachers, and other staff who work with students is to guide, facilitate, and support in the process of developing their ILPs. Also, ensure that students are reflecting on their previous records in their ILP.
