= FairyLoot =

UK-based online subscription service

- Type: Subscription service
- Founded: 2016; 10 years ago in London, United Kingdom
- Founder: Anissa de Gomery (co-founder); Michael Sammer (co-founder)
- Website: fairyloot.com

FairyLoot Ltd is a British subscription company founded in 2016 producing exclusive editions of fantasy books. It is best known for its monthly internationally shipped boxes with exclusive redesigned editions of hardcover books and licensed merchandise. In 2025, it started a science fiction and fantasy imprint, Wayward TxF, in collaboration with British publisher Transworld. The imprint's first book, Direbound, was released in August 2025.

== History ==
FairyLoot was founded in 2016 by cofounders Anissa de Gomery and Michael Sammer. The company was initially home-based and marketed directly to cofounder de Gomery's existing social media followers with its offering being limited to a young adult fantasy book box containing a new hardback release and up to 5 exclusive items. The company's first featured book was The Forbidden Wish by Jessica Khoury.

Since 2016, FairyLoot has expanded its subscription to produce exclusive hardback editions of new releases in collaboration with book printers and publishers. For its young adult book box, FairyLoot also produces book related merchandise and collectables with past items including enamel pins, fabric items and a series of “tarot cards” featuring character art. During the COVID-19 pandemic FairyLoot gained further popularity with the company's CEO attributing the growth in subscribers to people "rediscovering reading" during the COVID-19 lockdowns.

FairyLoot's CEO de Gomery, has stated that the company's aim is to create a sense of community through a subscription where readers “would all receive the same book every month and discover that world for the first time, together”; this along with the company's emphasis on subscribers promoting FairyLoot products on social media have also been attributed to FairyLoot's growth. The company experienced a tenfold increase in sales between 2020 and 2024 and is now estimated to ship over 10 thousand books a month including both subscription books and standalone special editions of major upcoming fantasy fiction titles. The exclusivity of the company's products, with a waitlist in place for all its subscription options, has resulted in the company's editions often having much greater resale values. By July 2024, FairyLoot had grown to employ 35 members of staffand reported a yearly profit of £2,650,778.

In April 2024 the subscription service expanded its offering to provide a romantasy focussed book box. The subscription was well received with over 10,000 people signing up for a waitlist prior to the release of its first box, featuring Analeigh Sbrana's Lore of the Wilds, shipped in May 2024. In addition to the company's “commitment to championing diverse voices” FairyLoot has also included independently published books in its romantasy subscription differentiating it from other book box subscription services. In May 2025, FairyLoot launched an epic fantasy subscription box in response to strong demand from customers. In October 2025, they announced a quarterly cosy fantasy subscription, to be launched in January 2026.

Like many “book boxes” FairyLoot is considered an increasingly important marketing tool for many books, with a marketing manager at Sourcebooks, the publisher of one of FairyLoot's 2020 books, stating in an interview that book boxes like FairyLoot provide a valuable “nonreturnable sale” with “digital and social promotion through unboxings and other user-generated content”. The large number of instant sales afforded by FairyLoot's subscriber base is often sufficient for a book to feature in the Sunday Times Bestseller List following its release and the success of books such as Saara El-Arifi's Faebound, which was featured in FairyLoot's December 2023 Adult Fantasy subscription and sold 14,503 copies in its first week, have been attributed to concentrated first week sales to subscribers of services like FairyLoot.

== Publishing imprint ==
Wayward TxF
- Books our way
- Parent company: Transworld at Penguin Random House
- Founded: January 2025; 20 months ago London, England, UK
- Official website: https://www.penguin.co.uk/about/publishing-houses/transworld/wayward-txf

In January 2025, FairyLoot announced the formation of their Science Fiction Fantasy publishing imprint, Wayward TxF, in collaboration with Transworld.

The imprints first book, Sable Sorenson's Dire Bound, was acquired in a 7 figure, 3-book deal and subsequently published in August 2025. The book was an instant The Sunday Times fiction hardback bestseller.

=== Books published ===
==== 2025 ====
- Dire Bound (August 2025) by Sable Sorenson
- The Wolf King (October 2025) by Lauren Palphreyman
- To Cage a Wild Bird (November 2025) by Brooke Fast

==== 2026 ====
- Steelborn (July 2026) by Taylor J LaRue
