= A II Z =

English heavy metal band

- Origin: Manchester, England
- Genres: Heavy metal
- Years active: 1979–1982
- Labels: Polydor

A II Z were an English heavy metal band founded in 1979 in Manchester, England, by the guitarist Gary Owens. The original line-up consisted of David Owens (vocals), Gary Owens (guitar), Cam Campbell (bass), Karl Reti (drums). For a short time they were one of the forerunners of the new wave of British heavy metal movement. They disbanded in 1982.

== Career ==
Manchester's A II Z (named after the A–Z Street Atlas) were formed by brothers Dave (vocals) and Gary Owens (guitar), Cam Campbell (bass), and Karl Reti (drums), during the initial excitement surrounding the new wave of British heavy metal. Immediately signed by major label Polydor, the group, whose style bore resemblances to Motörhead, Sweet Savage and Weapon, recorded their 1980 debut album, The Witch of Berkeley, which was recorded in the hall of Hazel Grove High School, and toured in support of Girlschool, Iron Maiden and Black Sabbath. The tours however failed to aid their record sales, and following the release of 1981's No Fun After Midnight EP and the single "I'm the One Who Loves You", the band were dropped from the label. Internal dissension had also taken root by this time and the Owens had dispensed with their original rhythm section to work with new bassist Tony Backhouse, who went on to form the band Mad Dogs and Mr Wolf, with Wally Rumsey and drummer Simon Wright (later of AC/DC) on that final single. But the quartet's new and more commercial AOR direction failed to bear fruit, and by the middle of 1982 A II Z had dissolved. Guitarist Gary Owens joined the similarly ill-fated NWOBHM band Tytan.

In 1993, Reborn Classics reissued The Witch of Berkeley as a bootleg CD which includes both singles as well as a four-track demo from Jaguar. In 2006 Majestic Rock officially re-released The Witch of Berkeley and also included the two singles and their B-sides.

== Discography ==
=== Studio albums ===
- The Witch of Berkeley (live) LP (Polydor 1980)

=== Singles and EPs ===
- "No Fun After Midnight" 7"/12" (Polydor 1981), sounds like Tush by ZZ Top and No Class by Motörhead.
- "I'm the One Who Loves You" 7" (Polydor 1981)

=== Reissue ===
- The Witch of Berkeley Bootleg CD (1993 Reborn Classics)
- The Witch of Berkeley CD (2006 Majestic Rock)

== See also ==
- List of New Wave of British Heavy Metal bands
