= Youwriteon =

Online writing circle

YouWriteOn was launched in January 2006 as an online writing circle to help new writers gain critical feedback on their work and improve their chances of getting published. Each month, YouWriteOn's top ten rated opening chapters receive feedback from professional editors working for major publishing houses.

To participate, writers upload their opening chapters. The chapters are randomly assigned by YouWriteOn to be peer critiqued and rated based on a variety of criteria: character, plot, pace & structure, use of language, narrative voice, dialogue, setting, theme and ideas.

On the first day of each month the five highest rated chapters receive a free professional critique.

== Professional critiques ==
The literary professionals involved with the site who provide feedback for the highest rated opening chapters of YouWriteOn members each month include editors for Bloomsbury Publishing, Random House and Orion Publishing Group.

== Book of the Year Award ==
At the end of each year, YouWriteOn's literary professionals judge the best opening chapters from the previous twelve months and choose the Book of the Year.

=== 2007 award ===
- Overall winner: Guy Saville for The Afrika Reich
- Children’s fiction winner: Justine Windsor for Charlie Squires goes Elsewhere

=== 2008 award ===
- Overall winner: Trilby Kent for Smoke Portrait
- Children’s fiction winner: Wai Ian Mo for Tiger-Mouse

=== 2009 Award ===
- Overall winner:
- Children’s fiction winner:

=== 2010 Award ===
- Overall winner: Charlotte Betts for The Apothecary’s Daughter.
- Children’s fiction winner: Justine Windsor for The Scarlet Heart

=== 2011 Award ===
- Overall winner: Robbie Smith for The Grower.
- Children’s fiction winner: Annie Oliver for Scarlett and the Soul Thief.

=== 2012 Award ===
- Overall winner: John Dylan for Divine Affairs
- Children’s fiction winner: Mike Hanson for 365 Rooms

=== 2013 Award ===
- Overall winner: Graeme Shimmin for A Kill in the Morning
- Children’s fiction winner: Mike Hanson for Jacob Groat & the Ghosts of Warehouse 33

== Successes ==
The Afrika Reich by Guy Saville, overall winner in 2007, was published by Hodder & Stoughton in 2012.

Katherine Webb, author of bestselling novel The Legacy, was discovered on youwriteon.com by publisher Orion after being, rated as a Top Ten story on youwriteon by members. The Legacy became an Amazon bestseller and Channel 4 TV Book Club winner.

Book of the Year (2007) finalist Douglas Jackson won a six-figure, two-book deal for his novel The Emperor’s Elephant. It was published, as Caligula, by Transworld Publishers in 2008 and Jackson went on to publish several sequels.

Third place winner in the children’s category (2007), Bob Burke, secured a deal with The Friday Project for his book The Third Pig Detective Agency.

The Bufflehead Sisters by 2nd place runner-up (2007) Patricia Delois was the #1 recommended novel in Maine Sunday Telegram's '10 must reads for Christmas', and was described as 'the most stunning work of imagination published by a Maine author this year'.

The Apothecary’s Daughter by Charlotte Betts, overall winner in 2010, was published by Piatkus in 2010.

A Kill in the Morning by Graeme Shimmin, overall winner in 2013, was published by Transworld Publishers in 2014.
