= Learning development =

Work with people to develop academic practices

Learning Development describes work with students and staff to develop academic practices, with a main focus on students developing academic practices in higher education. Learning developers are academic professionals who teach, advise and facilitate students to develop their academic practices, create academic development learning resources, and reflect on their academic practices through a community of practice.

Hilsdon (2011: 14) defines Learning Development as, "a complex set of multi-disciplinary and cross-disciplinary academic roles and functions, involving teaching, tutoring, research, and the design and production of learning materials, as well as involvement in staff development, policy-making and other consultative activities." The Association of Learning Development in Higher Education (ALDinHE) suggest Learning Developers work in a "bridging role" where they "mediate between the knowledge and skills which students bring to university and the demands and conventions of academic subjects, guiding students to navigate their university studies.". There has been growing acknowledgement that the work operates within a paradigm of 'Academic Literacies', meaning that it functions not to fix perceived deficits in students, but as a means of supporting them (and staff) to fully access the often tacit language and knowledge-making processes encoded in subject-disciplinary contexts.

Learning Development is the term primarily used to describe the work in UK. There is significant overlap with professional fields elsewhere, with common role titles including Academic Language and Learning Advisors (Australia), Tertiary Learning Advisors (Aetearoa New Zealand), Learning Specialists (Canada) and Academic Literacy Advisors (South Africa). There is also overlap with academic advising in the USA; however, there, the work is often more specifically focused on writing development. The Learning Development movement in the UK has aligned itself closely with the UK Educational Development movement in light of its developmental work with academic staff. However, the primary objective of Learning Development remains the development of student learning.

== History ==
The Learning Development movement began with the recognition of a new direction of practice emerging by founding and early members of an email discussion forum Community in 2002, which was transferred to the documented JISCMail Listserv Community LDHEN in 2003. Early members were all involved in the provision of study skills support, but recognised the limitations of a purely study-skills approach.

From 2005 onward, the establishment of the LearnHigher CETL (Centre of Excellence in Teaching and Learning) contributed greatly to the volume of publicly available Learning Development resources. The LearnHigher CELT was funded by the Higher Education Funding Council and comprised a consortium of teams from 16 universities, led by Liverpool Hope University to develop learning resources in 20 areas of study. LearnHigher aimed to develop and maintain a bank of open-access materials for self-access by students. The CETL later referred to their work as Learning Development.

The LDHEN later restructured and formed the Association of Learning Development in Higher Education (ALDinHE), which publishes the first peer reviewed journal dedicated to Learning Development, The Journal of Learning Development in Higher Education. This organisation has also organised a themed national conference since 2003 and annually since 2005, contributing greatly to the development of Learning Development as a distinct area of practice. The Staff and Educational Development Association (SEDA) have also provided space for ideas in Learning Development to develop, as have other student-focused organisations and conferences.

== Areas of Learning Development ==
Many learning developers resist categorising their practice into distinct subjects. For example, the use of statistics, encouraged by Learning Development, is cross-disciplinary; however, resources such as study guides are often categorised into distinct subjects. The following areas of Learning Development are taken from the LearnHigher website.

- Academic writing: The practice of writing in the style used in academic documents, such as academic books, journal articles and conference papers. It tends to be formal and objective in tone, but it should also be clear and concise.
- Artificial Intelligence (AI): The use of AI for learning, coursework and research.
- Assessment
- Continuous Professional Development (CPD): Resources to support Learning Development practitioners.
- Critical thinking: The application of critical thinking skills such as analysis, synthesis and evaluation in academic contexts.
- Diversity and inclusion: Work focused on support neurodiverse or disabled students, and inclusive practices that benefit all.
- Employability: Lifelong learning and skills for future employment.
- Group work: Specific guidance on working with others as part of learning and assessment.
- Independent learning: The underpinning skills that support learners in Higher Education. Can include things like organisation skills and time management, but also motivation and key academic skills.
- Information literacy: The academic discipline focused on accessing sources of information and making balanced judgements on them.
- Listening and interpersonal skills: Support for students with active listening and underpinning groupwork skills.
- Note making: The art of creating notes to capture learning from lectures, reading and other learning opportunities.
- Numeracy, mathematics and statistics: Advising focused on mathematics and numeracy. Can also include software support for statistics.
- Oral communication: Spoken communication, often as part of presentation, discussion, scenario and debate assessments.
- Reading: focuses on the critical analysis of academic texts, how to navigate them and how to synthesise materials.
- Referencing: is the process of properly attributing secondary material to the correct authors. It commonly involves citing sources and creating a reference list at the end of a document. Failure to reference correctly can lead to plagiarism.
- Reflective practice: helps students apply reflection in academic contexts, often through reflection on concrete experiences like learning, placements and classwork.
- Report writing: is similar to academic writing but it relates to more structured documents, such as technical reports and dissertations. These documents normally contain chapters which may be divided into sections or subsections, etc. There is often a specific genre for writing individual chapters within a report.
- Research skills: involves identifying a research aim or question, planning, deciding on a theoretical framework, deciding on a method, obtaining information (primary or secondary data or a combination of the two), describing and analysing the data obtained and drawing conclusions.
- Time management: Helping students navigate flexible Higher Education schedules, and often the requirements of self-management.
- Visual practices: Visual literacies and the underpinning skills for visual assessments like posters and presentations.

== Professional Associations ==
There are a range of associations that support academics and professionals who work in Learning Development and academic advising. The International Consortium of Academic Language and Learning Developers (ICALLD) was founded in 2015 to facilitate work between these associations. ICALLD has hosted bi-annual symposia focused on enhancing student learning and academic literacies. Held online, the symposia work across time zones to include all member organisations.

Country	Association Name	Established	ICALLD member?
Aotearoa New Zealand	Association of Tertiary Learning Advisors Aotearoa New Zealand (ATLAANZ)	2000	Yes
Australia	Association for Academic Language and Learning (AALL)	2005	Yes
Canada	Learning Specialists Association of Canada (LSAC)	2011	Yes
Scotland	Scottish Higher Education Learning Developers (ScotHELD, formerly ScotELAS)	2008	Yes
South Africa	South African Association for Academic Literacy Practitioners (SAAALP)	2021	
United Kingdom	Association for Learning Development in Higher Education	2007	Yes
United States	National Academic Advising Association (NACADA)	1979	No

== Key concepts in Learning Development ==
=== Academic literacies ===
Academic literacies

=== Transitions ===
Supporting student transitions into higher education is an established part of Learning Development practice. Much of this work focuses on demystifying Higher Education and helping students to navigate the hidden curriculum.

=== Assessment criteria ===
Lea and Street have demonstrated that university staff in various disciplines have varying expectations of students in assignments. Rust et al advocate explicating assessment criteria to augment success not only in the short term, but also to better facilitate learning for the long term. Nicol and Macfarlane-Dick summarise converging literature suggesting that internal feedback and student self-regulation are only possible with a good conception of the criteria. This has prompted learning developers to work centrally to explicate or negotiate assessment criteria. This ranges from resources providing disciplinary definitions of keywords, to one-to-one practice to negotiate student understandings of assessment criteria with reference to assignment drafts.

== Research in Learning Development ==
As a hybrid profession that cuts across teaching, research and services, research in Learning Development often focuses on academic scholarship and practitioners as researchers. Research-informed practice has drawn on various traditions of research, which a growing interest in participatory methods, students-as-partners and practitioner-led research.

In the United Kingdom, Learning Development in Higher Education serves as one of the earliest books that conceptualises Learning Development scholarship. Written in 2011, the book predicted the growth and diversification of Learning Development practices. This has been further expanded upon in How to be a Learning Developer in Higher Education and Doing Learning Development in Higher Education. Published in 2024 and 2026 respectively, these volumes reflect the diversity of practice.

The Journal of Learning Development in Higher Education (JLDHE) is a quarterly peer-reviewed publication published by the Association of Learning Development in Higher Education. The journal's scope focuses on all aspects of how learning is facilitated and how it is experienced by students in higher education, in the UK and internationally.

== A developmental model ==
The Learning Development movement emphasises learner development from any prior level of ability. This view is generally opposed to study skills that represent remedial education - aiming to bring weaker students up to a set standard. However, accepting that support may be the most developmental approach in some circumstances, study skills remain a feature of Learning Development.

Provision for strongly performing students and the extent to which a broader base of students should engage with Learning Development are both currently debated issues..

The characteristics of embedded provision, one-to-one provision and resource provision are each underpinned by the developmental model adopted by Learning Development.

=== Embedding ===
Teaching with learning objectives is also an effective way of integrating 'Learning Development' into the curriculum. This characteristic is usually referred to as embedding.

=== One-to-one provision ===
Learning Development practices have remained committed to provision one-to-one with academic staff.

== Allied areas of practice ==
=== Information literacy ===
Information literacy is sometimes seen as Learning Development, but also has its own distinct body of practice and literature.

According to the SCONUL Working Group on Information Literacy (2011: 3), Information Literacy is, "an umbrella term which encompasses concepts such as digital, visual and media literacies, academic literacy, information handling, information skills, data curation and data management."

SCONUL's seven pillars of information literacy are:

- Identify: Able to identify a personal need for information
- Scope: Can assess current knowledge and identify gaps
- Plan: Can construct strategies for locating information and data
- Gather: Can locate and access the information and data they need
- Evaluate: Can review the research process and compare and evaluate information and data
- Manage: Can organise information professionally and ethically
- Present: Can apply the knowledge gained: presenting the results of their research, synthesising new and old information and data to create new knowledge and disseminating it in a variety of ways

=== Mathematics support ===
Learning Development in numeracy, mathematics and statistics, commonly referred to as "mathematics support", works with students and staff to develop mathematical practice in the disciplines. Mathematics Support ranges from basic adult numeracy to advanced support for second and third year undergraduate mathematics students. This provision is commonly provided via a mathematics (learning) support centre.

The UK mathematics support movement is seen to have begun in 1993 with a conference held at the University of Luton and was influenced by the Minnesota model of developmental mathematics, and may be considered as a sub-movement, separate and tangential to Learning Development. A recent survey of mathematics support in the UK identified 88 out of 103 responding higher education institutions offering some form of mathematics support.

Mathematics support centres and services are also present in Australia and the Republic of Ireland. Statistics support for final year undergraduate and postgraduate students is often provided via a statistics advisory service.

=== Linguistics and EAP ===
English for Academic Purposes is an area which has a close relationship with Learning Development

== See also ==
- Academic advising
- Study skills
