= Research-informed teaching =

Pedagogical method

Research-informed teaching refers to the practice of linking research with teaching in Higher Education. Most universities in the world are organised into teaching and research divisions. Professors and lecturers will normally be contracted to do both and, in theory at least, course syllabi are structured around the teacher's research interests. Since the 1980s, there has been a growing movement to further integrate the two activities. This has led to a new interest in undergraduate research, where students enrolled on bachelor's degrees are given the opportunity to participate in research projects or undertake their own research.

This concept is also coined as Teaching-as-Research or Research-based Practices in Teaching in higher education. There are growing number of activities supported and sponsored by inter-university organizations such as the National Center for the Integration of Research, Teaching and Learning (CIRTL) Network.

== Worldwide ==
This practice was pioneered in America, where there is now a nationwide Council for Undergraduate Research, and in Australia. Recently, the UK Government funded several 'centres of excellence' which focus in different ways on undergraduate research. One of the most important is the Reinvention Centre for Undergraduate Research, which was set up in the Sociology department at Warwick University in partnership with the School of the Built Environment at Oxford Brookes University under the directorship of Mike Neary. The Centre's journal, Reinvention, launched in September 2007. In 2006, the UK Government also invested c.£25m into universities across the country to strengthen research-informed teaching. Key publications by Alan Jenkins, Roger Zetter, Mick Healey and Angela Brew have further developed the research base for research-informed teaching. In April 2007 the University of Central Lancashire appointed the first ever Chair in Research-informed Teaching, Stuart Hampton-Reeves, and in September 2007 launched a Centre for Research-informed Teaching.

== Efficacy ==
While university instruction is optimal when grounded in empirical findings, some concerns have arisen regarding the efficacy of university instruction at research focused institutions. A growing number of these higher education research institutions focus on the researching prowess of the potential professor (and, in many cases, the grant-writing ability of prospective employee) while often paying substantially less attention to one's ability to disseminate the information. Of course, those talented instructors who are both strong in research and instruction have the potential to really impact their students.

== Scientific studies on the teaching-research nexus ==
According to conventional wisdom, university professors must engage in both research and teaching because these activities are believed to be mutually reinforcing. However, numerous empirical studies have shown that teaching effectiveness and research productivity are nearly uncorrelated. In a meta-analysis of 58 studies, Hattie and Marsh (1996) conclude that the common belief that research and teaching are inextricably entwined is an enduring myth. This finding might not be surprising, given that research and teaching require quite different talents and personality traits. Stappenbelt (2013) concludes that in order to facilitate student learning, teaching and research activities of academics should be unbundled.

Given these empirical findings, it is a puzzle why universities force researchers to teach. One explanation can be given by contract theory. Research efforts are unobservable and their outcome is highly uncertain, so there is a moral hazard problem. When wages cannot be negative, universities must leave economic rents to researchers in order to motivate them to exert high effort. Schmitz (2023) has shown that bundling research with verifiable teaching duties can be a (welfare-reducing but) profit-maximizing strategy for universities. Some teaching duties can be used as a punishment for bad research outcomes, and even teaching duties that are not conditioned on research outcomes may be used to inefficiently extract rents from researchers.
