= Submittable =

American software company

- Company type: Private
- Industry: Software
- Founded: 2010
- Founders: Michael FitzGerald; Bruce Tribbensee; John Brownell
- Headquarters: Missoula, Montana, United States
- Products: Submission and application management software
- Website: www.submittable.com

Submittable is an American software company based in Missoula, Montana. The company develops software for collecting, reviewing, and managing submissions and applications. It was founded in 2010 by Michael FitzGerald, Bruce Tribbensee, and John Brownell.

== History ==
Submittable began as a submission-management service for publishers and literary magazines. FitzGerald, a writer and web developer, developed the service after finding that submissions were being handled through email, postal mail, home-built forms, and enterprise systems. The company was originally called Submishmash.

Submittable was part of Y Combinator in 2012 and raised early funding from 77Ventures, Flywheel Ventures, and Montana-based angel investors. It raised $5 million in Series A funding in 2017 and $10 million in Series B funding in 2019. In 2022, GeekWire reported that the company had raised $47 million in Series C funding led by Accel-KKR and had opened a second office in Bellevue, Washington. In 2024, Submittable acquired WizeHive, a software company for grants, scholarships, fellowships, giving, and related programs.

== Use in literary publishing ==
Submittable has been used by writers, editors, journals, presses, and contests to manage literary submissions. Poets & Writers described it as one of the established services in the submission-management field, while CMS Critic noted that writers could use one account to track submissions across journals using the platform. In 2025, The Writer reported that some literary-magazine editors valued Submittable's organization while others were concerned about its fees.
