= TCRWP's Writing Workshop =

Method of writing instruction for children created by Lucy Calkins

The Teachers College Reading and Writing Project's Writing Workshop was a method of writing instruction for children developed by teacher Lucy Calkins and her colleagues at the Teachers College, Columbia University.

In October 2023, Teachers College announced it would be closing the Reading and Writing Project and replacing it with a new program, based on new research and criticism received about the program in recent years. Calkins is not the director of the new project, which will be managed by the Advancing Literacy unit.

== History ==
Lucy Calkins initially published her model, co-authored with others involved in the Teachers College Reading and Writing Project (TCRWP) at Columbia University in New York City, in her book A Guide to The Writing Workshop, Grades 3-5 (Portsmouth, New Hampshire: First Hand, 2006). Calkin was inspired by the early work of Donald Graves, Donald Murray, and other teacher/researchers who found that coaching adult students to write for a variety of audiences and purposes was more effective than traditional writing instruction; she then extrapolated this approach to teaching children from ages 5 and up.

Calkin's method focused on the goal of fostering lifelong writers. It was based upon four principles: students will write about their own lives, they will use a consistent writing process, they will work in authentic ways, and they will develop independence as writers. The curriculum was developed as part of a program that also included reading.

TCRWP's Writing Workshop was designed for use in all grade levels. Each grade level had specific units of study tailored to meet developmental and curricular needs. Students had a large amount of choice in their topic and style of writing. The teacher acted as a mentor author, modeling writing techniques and conferring with students as they moved through the writing process. Direct writing instruction took place in the form of a mini-lesson at the beginning of each workshop and was followed by a minimum of 45 minutes of active writing time. Each workshop ended with a sharing of student work.

== Process ==
Establishing a consistent writing process that the students work through was one of the main principles of TCRWP's Writing Workshop. Each student moved through the process at his or her rate. However, however deadlines were set for each step so that each writing unit could be completed in a timely manner.

Possible timeline for the workshop:

1. Generating Ideas (1–2 days)
2. Collecting writing entries (5–10 days)
3. Choosing a seed idea (2–3 days)
4. Planning the draft (1–2 days)
5. Revising to change the content and quality (1–3 days)
6. Editing to improve grammar (1–2 days)
7. Publishing the piece to share it with the world (1–3 days)
8. Writing Celebration (1 day)

== Structure of the TCRWP Writing Workshop ==
1. Signal the beginning of the writing workshop

- Use a consistent signal to begin workshop. Some ideas are chimes, a bell, turning on small Christmas lights, singing a song or using a special clap.

2. Direct, explicit mini-lesson (See mini-lesson information below).
3. Writing time

- During this time the teacher guides the young authors through writing conferences, meets with small groups to teach specific writing techniques and/or works one-on-one with authors. Students may also work with a partner during this time with teacher permission.

4. Sharing of student work

- Students that have tried out the concept from the mini-lesson are highlighted.

== Mini-lessons ==
Mini-lessons should be about 10–15 minutes in length. Not all proponents of writing workshop include a mini-lesson, however, as some approaches incorporate the instruction into small-group or individual conferences. Calkins, however, recommends following the same structure each time: make a connection to a previous lesson, teach a new writing technique, and have the students practice the technique right there with your guidance.

Possible Mini-lesson topics are:

- using dialog to show an action
- stretching out actions
- adding internal thinking
- elaborating on physical descriptions
- starting a story with an action
- starting a story with dialog
- end with a sound
- using circular ending
- creating imagery through words
- narrowing a story, making it more focused
- choosing a seed idea
- creating a strong ending

== Conferring ==
Lucy Calkins (1994) has described conferring as, “the heart of our teaching” (p. 189) in the TCRWP Writing Workshop. Conferring takes place during the time when students are actively writing. The teacher circulates around the room, meeting with individual students or student groups to discuss their writing progress. The conferences are often short, typically lasting anywhere from two to seven minutes (Ray, 2001, p. 158).

Calkins (1994) has described a three-step process for facilitating these conferences: “research, decide, teach” (p. 224). The teacher begins the conference by asking probing, open-ended questions to ascertain the student's current focus in his/her writing work. Once the teacher has identified an area of need, the teaching can begin. The teaching often includes critical feedback for the student, a short time in which the student and teacher practice the new skill or strategy, and a link to how the new skill or strategy will improve the child's future work as a writer (Anderson, 2000, p. 26).

Another component of the conference is record keeping. The teacher, and sometimes also the student, can make anecdotal notes about the content of the conference. This will allow the teacher to refer back to previous notes and monitor students’ growth as writers.

“The interesting thing is that in teaching writing, we often unmask our own processes in readers and writers, thinking aloud in front of our kids so they can learn how good readers and writers think about texts" (Calkins, Hartman, White, 2005, p. 62). The teacher knows it is important while facilitating the start of the conference to begin with a positive comment about the student's writing piece.

One way to get better on forming instructional needs is to take time to look at “student work outside of class time and thinking about the decision you might make for this student” (Calkins, Hartman, White, 2005, p. 62). Peter Elbow pioneered thinking about feedback through workshop approaches.

International Writing Project instructors Allen Koshewa and Elly Tobin emphasize that teaching students how to respond to each other's work is also crucial. They recommend that a peer response session include providing feedback on the overall message, citing at least one strong point about the writing or its potential, and inviting the author to present concerns or questions.

== TCRWP's Writing Workshop aligned with the Common Core ==
Although the National Writing Project and other organizations promoting workshop approaches favor an organic approach rather than a scripted one, the writing workshop approach has increasingly been commercialized. Lucy Calkins and her colleagues from the Teachers College Reading and Writing Project wrote a new guide called A Curricular Plan for the Writing Workshop (Heinemann, 2011). This aimed to align the units of study she recommended in the past with the new Common Core State Standards, including narrative, persuasive, informational, and poetry writing (p. 2 A Curricular Plan for the Writing Workshop).

Written by grade level, this resource took the school year month by month and guides teachers towards instructing with a balance of narrative and nonfiction writing. Mini-lesson ideas, additional resources and celebrations were discussed as well, with a focus towards “lifting the level of student work” in every unit.

== Criticism ==
Critiques of Calkins' model have stated that it was based on an approach used for adults rather than children, that it did not properly include reading skills, and that it ignored the findings of cognitive scientists.

In 2022, Calkins stated she is now "embrac[ing] phonics and the science of reading". Though she is no longer in charge of the Teachers College Reading and Writing Project, Calkins has set up a new company called Mossflower to offer professional development services, as well as a website called Rebalancing Literacy, which she hopes "brings people together and supports civil conversation".

== Bibliography ==
- Anderson, C. (2000). How's it going: A practical guide to conferring with student writers. Portsmouth, New Hampshire: Heinemann.
- Calkins, L. (1994). The art of teaching writing (new ed.). Portsmouth, New Hampshire: Heinemann.
- Graves, D. (1994). A fresh look at writing. Portsmouth: New Hampshire: Heinemann.
- Units of Study for Teaching Writing, Grades K-2,2006, FirstHand Press
- Units of Study for Teaching Writing, Grades 3-5, 2006, FirstHand Press
- How Writers Work, Ralph Fletcher, 2000, HarperCollins
- Ray, K. W. (2001). The writing workshop: Working through the hard parts (and they're all hard parts). Urbana, Illinois: National Council of Teachers of English.
- Calkins, L., Hartman, A.,& White, Z. (2005). "One to One". Portsmouth, New Hampshire: Heinemann.
- Calkins, L (2011). A Curricular Plan for the Writing Workshop. Portsmouth, New Hampshire: Heinemann.
- Kissel, B. (2017). When writers drive the workshop. Portland, Maine: Stenhouse.
- Remembering Donald H. Graves - National Writing Project
