= Teachers College Reading and Writing Project =

Educational project in New York

Teachers College Reading and Writing Project (TCRWP or "The Project") was founded and directed by Lucy Calkins, The Robinson Professor of Children's Literature at Teachers College, Columbia University. Its mission was to help young people become avid and skilled readers, writers, and inquirers through research, curriculum development, and in-school professional development. TCRWP developed methods and tools for the teaching of reading and writing through research, curriculum development published through Heinemann, and professional development with teachers and school leaders. TCRWP supported the Reading Workshop and Writing Workshop approaches through its Units of Study curriculum. The project involved thousands of schools and teachers in New York and around the country in an ongoing, multi-faceted in-service community of practitioners engaged in the application and continual refinement of approaches to helping children become effective writers and readers.

In October 2023, TCWRP transitioned to The Reading & Writing Project at Mossflower, the business entity which had previously only held Calkins' work outside of New York City.

== Curriculum and research ==
TCRWP was founded by Lucy Calkins in 1981. Prior to founding the Project, Calkins was a researcher working with Donald Graves on the first research study on writing funded by the National Institute of Education.

After founding the Project, Calkins developed methodologies designed to increase the amount of writing in classrooms, such as the use of texts as models for writing. In its early years, the work of the Project was focused primarily on supporting writing instruction, later this focus widened to include reading and support for all components of balanced literacy. By 2013, the Project had affiliations with over 600 schools and an extensive involvement in New York City's education system, working with hundreds of districts and whole cities such as Chicago, Albany, and Seattle, as well as internationally in Israel, Sweden, Jordan, and others.

Curriculum developed by Project staff supports a balanced literacy approach to reading and writing instruction that is in wide use across the United States. Calkins and TCRWP have tailored the approach to the Common Core Standards by increasing the amount of nonfiction, including more discussion of difficult texts and decreasing the amount of time devoted to personal writing. The "Writer's Workshop" model is based on the idea that children are natural writers.

According to The New York Times, TCRWP and Lucy Calkins were "architects" of New York City's balanced literacy program in schools. New York Magazine referred to Calkins as "looked upon nationally as a godmother of whole-language learning." Balanced Literacy took off under Mayor Michael Bloomberg, who mandated the approach in 2003 and turned to Lucy Calkins as an early advocate of the approach, which factored into the "Reading Wars" nationally in the debate between phonics vs. whole-language instruction. In New York City schools that work closely with TCRWP, 20% more students performed at or above standards on the state's English Language Arts test in 2016. At least 10,000 New York City teachers attended Project workshops and TCRWP held millions of dollars in city contracts.

The TCRWP published Units of Study in Writing for Grades K-8, Units of Study in Reading for Grades K-8, and Units of Study in Phonics for Grades K-1. The Units of Study curriculum guide books and "workshop" model centered on independent student work in combination with teacher modeling and one-on-one and small-group guidance.

The Project also published a Classroom Library Series through Heinemann, which included books for grades K-8 from more than 50 different publishers. These books were designed for students who read both on grade level and below, and each library contains between 450 and 700 titles spanning from fiction and nonfiction genres such as classics, sports, science, mystery, fantasy, biography, and history, and features a strong social justice component.

The Project also jointly operated Reading Rescue, a literacy intervention program, in hundreds of schools in New York City.

== Professional development ==
The Project provided curricular calendars to schools and worked weekly with principals, literacy coaches, and teachers. TCRWP also had multi-day training institutes and one-day workshops for teachers and administrators at Teachers College, Columbia University.

As of 2003, TCRWP worked in thousands of classrooms and schools around the world. More than 170,000 teachers attended the Project's week-long institutes, and over 4,000 teachers attended summer institutes. TCRWP worked during the year with about a third of New York City's 80,000 teachers.

== Change in approach ==
In October 2020, APM Reports published a statement by The Teachers College of Reading and Writing Project discussing recent research findings that would lead to what TCRWP referred to as a "rebalancing" of their curriculum. The primary change was that Calkins believes that early readers need more focused instruction on phonics and decodable words.

In October 2023, TCWRP became The Reading & Writing Project at Mossflower, the business entity which had previously only held Calkins' work outside of New York City.
