= Lucy Calkins =

American educator and professor

Lucy M Calkins
- Born: Lucy McCormick Calkins
- Occupation: Educator

Lucy Calkins is an American educator and professor at Teachers College, Columbia University who is best known for creating the Units of Study reading and writing curriculum.

== Early life ==
Calkins and her eight siblings were raised by their parents who were both doctors. Calkins used to babysit Donald Graves's children, which got her interested in reading and writing. She attended Williams College and graduated in 1973. She earned her doctorate in English education from NYU.

== Career ==
Calkins was a high school teacher in Connecticut. She left that job for an unpaid internship at a primary school in Oxfordshire to learn about the British education model, which was considered to be more effective at teaching reading than the United States.

In 1981, Calkins founded the Teachers College Reading and Writing Project institute in Columbia University's Teacher College.

In 1986, she published The Art of Teaching Writing before expanding her teaching philosophy to reading with the publication of The Art of Teaching Reading in 2001.

Calkins created the reading and writing curriculum, Units of Study, which is used in thousands of American schools. It emphasizes teaching reading through context and cues (whole language) instead of teaching phonics. In the early 2000s, it became central to the New York City public school system's curriculum.

== Criticism ==
Calkins's methods for reading education, derived from the context and cue theories of Marie Clay, have been criticized by researchers and educators for contradicting the science of reading and impeding the reading development of millions of American students. Critics noted that her unconventional approach taught beginning readers to guess words using pictures and context clues instead of decoding words with systematic phonics, a method supported by decades of scientific and cognitive research.

In May 2022, The New York Times reported that Calkins had made "a major retreat" by revising her curriculum to include daily phonics instruction, though educators argued that the changes could not undo the harm done to generations of students. In October 2022, American Public Media debuted the podcast Sold a Story, discussing the negative impacts of Calkins's work on reading education in American public schools, as well as numerous studies that contradicted Clay's cueing theory. In 2024, The Atlantic covered the criticism of Calkins and reported on how she had become the central figure blamed for reading score declines.

In December 2024, a lawsuit was filed in the United States District Court for the District of Massachusetts, alleging that "deceptive" and "defective" literacy products from publisher Heinemann and three authors, including Calkins, Irene Fountas, and Gay Su Pinnell, made it more difficult for children to learn to read. In May 2025, the court dismissed the case, stating it was not adequately equipped to adjudicate disputes over educational policy and research.

== Selected publications ==
- Calkins, Lucy M (2020). Teaching Writing. Portsmouth, New Hampshire: Heinemann. ISBN 978-0-325-11812-3.
- Calkins, Lucy M (2018). Leading Well. Portsmouth, New Hampshire: Heinemann. ISBN 978-0-325-10922-0.
- Calkins, Lucy M (2014). Writing Pathways. Portsmouth, New Hampshire: Heinemann. ISBN 978-0-325-05730-9.
- Calkins, Lucy M (2005). Big Lessons from Small Writers. Portsmouth, New Hampshire: Heinemann. ISBN 978-0-325-00748-9.
- Calkins, Lucy M (2005). One to One. Portsmouth, New Hampshire: Heinemann. ISBN 978-0-325-00788-5.
- Calkins, Lucy M (1994). The Art of Teaching Writing. Portsmouth, New Hampshire: Heinemann. ISBN 978-0-435-08809-5.
