= Listed buildings in Macclesfield =

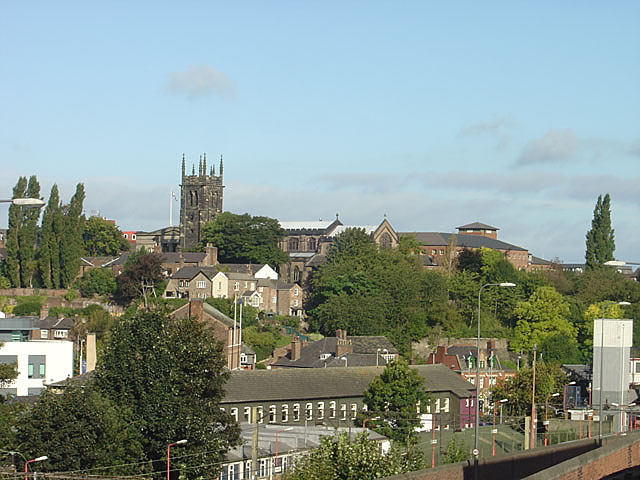
Macclesfield showing St Michael's church at the top of the hill

Macclesfield is a town in Cheshire East, England. It was originally a market town, and was granted a charter in 1261. The medieval town surrounded a hilltop that contained the Church of St Michael and the marketplace. Industry came to the town in the 18th century following the building of the first silk mill by Charles Roe in 1743. This industry grew with the building of more mills, and of houses incorporating weavers' garrets on the top floor, with large windows to light them. The mills were initially supplied with power from horses, or from the River Bollin, which ran through the town. Later, steam power was introduced. Communication was improved by the building of the Macclesfield Canal, which was completed in 1831. The silk industry declined from 1851, industry in the town diversified, and most of the surviving silk mills were converted into other industrial purposes or for domestic use. During the 20th century, some of the buildings were cleared from the town centre, and housing estates were built on the periphery of the town.

The history of the town is reflected in its listed buildings. Apart from an ancient cross shaft, St Michael's Church and the Unitarian chapel, the oldest listing buildings are houses, most of which are timber-framed or have a timber-framed core. From the late 17th century to the early 19th century many of the listed buildings are Neoclassical or Georgian in style. Most of the early silk mills have been demolished, the oldest surviving former silk mills being Little Street Mill, which was built in 1804, and Regency Mill, which was built in about 1820. With the coming of the Victorian era the architectural style of the churches and public buildings changed from Neoclassical and Georgian to Gothic Revival. The construction of the Macclesfield Canal resulted in a number of associated structures that have been listed, including eight bridges and a milestone. Other developments in the town resulted in buildings that have been listed, including the Militia Barracks, constructed in the late 1850s, the cemetery that opened in 1866, and Parkside Hospital (originally an asylum) that opened in 1871. In addition to listed houses, churches, public buildings, schools, mills, and public houses, there is a variety of other structures that have been listed; these include almshouses, boundary stones, bollards, and a museum. The only listed buildings dating from the 20th century are the War Memorial, and a pair of telephone kiosks in front of the Town Hall. As of 2014 there are 218 buildings that are recorded in the National Heritage List for England as designated listed buildings. Of these, 18 are listed at Grade II*, the middle grade, and the others are at Grade II. There are no buildings listed at Grade I.

== Key ==
Grade	Criteria
I	Buildings of exceptional interest, sometimes considered to be internationally important
II*	Particularly important buildings of more than special interest
II	Buildings of national importance and special interest

== Buildings ==
Name and location	Photograph	Date	Notes	Grade
Cross on parish boundary 53.27287°N 2.15555°W	—	11th century (probable)	This is in buff sandstone and consists of a tapering circular shaft about 1.3 metres (4.3 ft) high. The top is broken off.	II
St Michael's Church; 53.26027°N 2.12446°W		1278	There is little original fabric remaining. Two chapels were built in 1503–07 and in 1620. The present chancel dates from 1882, and the nave from 1899 to 1901; a narthex was added in 2003–04. The church consists of a nave with aisles, a chancel with vestries, two south chapels and a west tower. Inside the church are numerous memorials.	II*
96 Mill Street; 53.25764°N 2.12551°W	—	Late 16th century (probable)	Originally a house, later a shop, it has a timber-framed core. There is mock timber framing on the front and it has a Welsh slate roof. The shop is in two low storeys and it has a three-bay front, the outer bays being gabled. There is a central doorway, and the windows are casements.	II
Tytherington Old Hall; 53.28092°N 2.13247°W	—	Late 16th century	Originally a farmhouse, it was altered in the 20th century. It is timber-framed on a stone plinth, and has a stone-flagged roof. The house is in two storey, and has an L-shaped plan, consisting of a long main wing and a gabled cross-wing on the left. The timber-framing includes close studding.	II
28 Chestergate; 53.26070°N 2.12703°W		Late 16th or early 17th century	Originally a house, later used as a shop, this is a timber-framed building with a Welsh slate roof, and a brick front added in the 19th century. It is in three storeys and has a two-bay front. In the ground floor is a bow window and a passage leading to a doorway on the left side. The other windows are sashes.	II
34 Mill Street; 53.25921°N 2.12588°W		Late 16th or early 17th century	A building that is basically timber-framed but which has been altered and extended. On the front is mock timber framing, and at the back is stuccoed brick. The building has a Welsh slate roof, is in four storeys, and has a single-bay front. On the ground floor is a shop front, and above there is one window to each storey.	II
Bate Hall Public House; 53.26089°N 2.12742°W		Late 16th or early 17th century	The public house is basically timber-framed and probably originated as a dwelling. The front is in rendered brick, and the rear wing is in stone. The main range is in three storeys with a five-bay front, and contains sash windows. In the gable of the rear wing are two mullioned windows. Inside is a 17th-century staircase.	II*
1–7 Chester Road; 53.26070°N 2.13217°W	—	Early 17th century	There have been later alterations and additions to the building that consists of a row of three shops in two storeys, built in sandstone with stone-flagged roofs. In the ground floor are doorways and shop windows. Above are two gables, with two three-light mullioned windows and casements.	II
50, 52 and 54 Chestergate; 53.26077°N 2.12780°W		17th century	A row of three shops, originally timber-framed, with a later brick façade. They are in two storeys with shop fronts in the ground floor. The upper floor contains a mix of sashes and casements in gabled dormers with bargeboards and finials.	II
115, 115A, 115B and 115C Chestergate; 53.26093°N 2.13081°W		Late 17th century (probable)	This originated as a timber-framed building, probably a house. It was later encased in brick, and was refronted in about 1920. The roof is slated, and the building has two storeys with a modern shop front below and casement windows above.	II
3 and 5 Pexhill Road; 53.25879°N 2.16223°W	—	Late 17th century (probable)	A pair of houses that are built in rendered brick with a possible timber-framed core. They are roofed with heavy flags and have casement windows. The original part is in 1½ storeys and consists of a main block and a cross-wing to the left. On the right is a later two-storey single-bay extension. One of the windows is in a gabled dormer above the doorway.	II
5 and 6 St Michael's Terrace; 53.25987°N 2.12415°W		Late 17th century	A pair of buildings joined by a timber-framed bridge. They are built in stone with stone-flagged roofs, and No. 6 has a timber-framed core. No. 6 is in two storeys with a three-bay front; No. 5 is small with a single-bay at right angles to No. 6. Most of the windows are inserted casements.	II
George Hotel; 53.26311°N 2.12560°W	—	Late 17th century	A public house extensively rebuilt in the 19th and 20th centuries. It is built in roughcast brick with a Welsh slate roof. The building is in three storeys with cellars. It has a three-bay front and a two-storey single-bay gabled extension to the left. The doorway is round-headed with a fanlight, and the windows are mullioned and transomed.	II
Oldham's Hollow Farmhouse; 53.27762°N 2.12885°W	—	Late 17th century	A stone farmhouse with a stone-flagged roof and a timber-framed core. It is in three storeys and has a three-bay front. The doorway has a moulded architrave. The windows are mullioned, those in the top storey being in gabled dormers.	II
Unitarian Chapel; 53.26116°N 2.12625°W		1689	This was originally a Presbyterian chapel, and later became Unitarian. It is constructed in sandstone with a stone-flagged roof, and has a pair of external staircases. The chapel is expressed in two storeys, with sides of six bays. Inside are east and west galleries, and a two-decker pulpit with a sounding board.	II*
41 Chestergate; 53.26088°N 2.12755°W		1691	Originally a timber-framed house, with alterations in the 19th and 20th centuries converting it into a shop. The front is in rendered brick, the back is in stone, and the roof is in Welsh slate. It is in three storeys, with a two-bay front and a rear wing. In the ground floor are inserted shop fronts.	II
Spring Cottage, Foden Bank and Greystones; 53.24505°N 2.11635°W	—	1691	A house built in several phases, later divided into three houses. The building is in brick with stone-flagged and concrete tiled roofs, and has two storeys. One of the houses has a doorway with architrave containing Corinthian pilasters. Some of the windows are sashes, and others are mullioned and transomed.	II
Charles Roe House; 53.26078°N 2.12840°W		c. 1700	A brick house with stone dressings and a slate roof. It has a double-pile plan, is in three storeys and has a front of five . The doorway has an open pediment and a cornice. The windows are sashes.	II*
Cumberland House; 53.26213°N 2.12595°W		Early 18th century	Originally one house, later extended and divided into two dwellings in three phases. It is built in stone with a stone-flagged roof. All parts are in two storeys, the two parts facing Jordangate each has two bays. The older part on the left has an enriched Venetian window, and the later part has a pedimented doorcase. The third phase is in three bays facing Cumberland Street, and has a round-arched doorway with a Tuscan architrave and a fanlight. The windows are sashes.	II*
Jordangate House (or Pear Tree House); 53.26205°N 2.12554°W		1728	Originally a house, later used as offices, it is built in brick with stone dressings and a stone-flagged roof. It is in Georgian style with a double-pile plan. The front has five bays, and there is a single-story, single-bay extension to the right. The central doorway has fluted Corinthian pilasters, a pediment and a fanlight containing interlacing tracery. The windows are sashes with architraves containing keystones.	II*
Wall, piers, railings and gates, Jordangate House; 53.26206°N 2.12566°W		c. 1730	There is a low brick wall with moulded stone copings. At the ends are piers decorated with panels and surmounted by urns. The railings and gates are in wrought iron.	II*
101–107 Chestergate; 53.26094°N 2.13045°W	—	Mid-18th century (or earlier)	Originating possibly as two dwellings, and later converted into two shops and a restaurant, separated by a central passage. The building are in stone and they have a stone-flagged roof. In the lower floor are shop fronts and doorways, and above are casement windows.	II
Beech Cottages; 53.26933°N 2.12922°W	—	Mid-18th century	A pair of cottages built in sandstone and brick with a tiled roof. They are in two storeys, and each cottage has a two-bay front. Most of the windows are mullioned, with a sash window in the southeast gable.	II
Sundial, St Michael's Churchyard; 53.26019°N 2.12498°W		18th century (probable)	The sundial is in stone and consists of a baluster-pedestal on a base. The dial is no longer present.	II
1 Pexhill Road; 53.25888°N 2.16212°W	—	1750	A rendered brick house with a stone-flagged roof. It is in three storeys and has a three-bay front. In the central bay are a doorway, above which are two blind windows and a small gable. The other bays contain sash windows.	II
4, 6 and 8 Chestergate; 53.26057°N 2.12616°W		c. 1750	A brick house with stone dressings, later used as shops and offices. It is in three storeys and has a six-bay front. In the ground floor are shop fronts, a central doorway with a moulded architrave, and a doorway to a rear passage. The windows are sashes.	II
19 King Edward Street; 53.26156°N 2.12721°W		1758	A brick house with stone dressings and a Welsh slate roof, extended and converted into offices in 1927. The original house is in three storeys with a five-bay front. The central doorway has a rusticated surround and a Doric porch with a pediment. On each side is a Palladian window; the other windows are sashes. The extension consists of a single-bay with three storeys on each side and, to the right a further extension of similar height in two storeys. This contains a three-light window with a similar shape to the Palladian windows in the lower floor and a large window above.	II
Christ Church; 53.25875°N 2.13053°W		1775	A former Anglican church, it is now redundant and in the care of the Churches Conservation Trust. The church is built in brick with stone dressings, and is in Georgian style. It consists of a nave, a short chancel and a tall west tower with a clock and an embattled parapet. At the east end is a Palladian window.	II*
38 and 40 Jordangate; 53.26283°N 2.12575°W	—	Late 18th century	A pair of houses with an earlier core that were altered in the 19th century. They are built in stone with a stone-flagged roof. The houses are in two storeys with simple moulded doorcases. In the lower storey are 19th-century shop windows and a sash window, with 19th-century oriel windows in the upper floor.	II
2A King Edward Street, 3 Market Place; 53.26132°N 2.12575°W		Late 18th century	Originally a house, later used as a printing works, after that shops with accommodation above. It is built in brick with a stone-flagged roof. The building is in three storeys, with two bays on Market Place, four on King Edward Street, and a canted bay between them. The ground floor on Market Place contains two modern shop fronts, and on the King Edward Street front is a doorway with flanking windows and a traceried fanlight. The other windows are sashes.	II
11 King Edward Street; 53.26154°N 2.12660°W		Late 18th century	A brick house with a slate roof that has an earlier core. It is in three storeys and has a two-bay front. On the left is an inserted Georgian doorway, and the windows are sashes. Inside the house are medieval timbers.	II
36 Park Green; 53.25623°N 2.12239°W	—	Late 18th century	Originally a house, later used as offices, it is in rendered brick with a Welsh slate roof. The building is in two storeys and has a front of five bays, the central bay projecting forward. The doorcase has engaged Tuscan columns, an open pediment, and a fanlight. The windows in the ground floor are sashes and those in the upper floor are mullioned. All the windows have painted voussoir heads with keystones.	II
25, 27 and 29 Tytherington Lane; 53.28222°N 2.12522°W	—	Late 18th century	Originally a row of three houses, later converted into a single dwelling. It is built in stone with a stone-flagged roof. The house is in two storeys, and has a central doorway. The windows are casements, those in the upper floor having Gothic-style tracery.	II
90 and 92 Waters Green; 53.25922°N 2.12439°W	—	Late 18th century	Originally a row of houses, later converted for commercial use. They are built in brick with a stone-flagged roof, and have an irregular six-bay front. There are two storeys at the front and three at the rear. On the front there are modern shop fronts and two round-headed doorways with fanlights on the lower floor, and sash windows above. At the rear are Gothic-arched windows and casements.	II
The Castle Public House; 53.25946°N 2.12531°W	—	Late 18th century (probable)	The public house was remodelled and extended in the 19th century. It is built in painted brick with Welsh slate roofs. The public house is in two storeys with a central entrance leading to a corridor with rooms on each side. Many of the interior fittings have been retained.	II
Mile House; 53.25542°N 2.10190°W	—	Late 18th century	A stone house with a stone-flagged roof. It is in two storeys, originally with two bays, with a third bay added later. The main entrance, which has a moulded architrave, is in the gable end, facing the street. The windows are casements.	II
Old Vicarage; 53.26673°N 2.12831°W	—	Late 18th century	A brick house with a stone-flagged roof. It is in three storeys and has a three-bay front, with a later rectangular bay window in the right bay. The central bay projects slightly forward and contains a Tuscan doorcase with a pediment and a fanlight. In each gable apex is a semicircular window. The other windows are sashes.	II
1, 3 and 5 Lark Hall Yard; 53.25840°N 2.10575°W	—	Late 18th century (probable)	A row of three houses that possibly originated as stabling. They are built in brick on a stone plinth and have a stone-flagged roof. The houses have two storeys and a front of four bays. The outer bays project forward and the roof continues over the recessed bays. The doorways have stone architraves and the windows are sashes.	II
Barn, Mile House; 53.25540°N 2.10167°W	—	Late 18th century	The barn is a simple rectangular stone building. It is in a single storey with a loft. There is a pitch hole in the gable facing the road, and an inserted opening on the west side.	II
Park Green House; 53.25632°N 2.12256°W	—	Late 18th century	A brick house with stone dressings and a Welsh slate roof in two storeys. The front facing Sunderland Street has a truncated gable containing a semicircular window. There is a central doorway with an architrave and Doric columns. above which is an enriched Venetian window with Ionic pilasters and an open balustrade. On the Park Green front are four bays, one of which contains a full height canted bay window. At the top is a moulded cornice and a stuccoed panelled parapet.	II*
Ivydeane; 53.25269°N 2.15374°W	—	1779	A brick house with a stone-flagged roof. It is in two storeys and has a three-bay front. The central entrance has a canopied gabled porch, above which is a blind window.	II
Parish boundary stone 53.27226°N 2.16863°W	—	1789	The stone marks the boundary between the parishes of Macclesfield and Prestbury. It is a rectangular block of stone with a shaped top, and is inscribed with "F" for Fallibroome and "M" for Macclesfield.	II
Parish boundary stone, Peel Street; 53.25266°N 2.12536°W	—	1789	The boundary stone is partly buried in the garden of No. 69 Peel Street. It consists of a stone block with shaped head, and is inscribed with the date, "M" for Macclesfield and "S" for Sutton.	II
Wesleyan Methodist Chapel; 53.25807°N 2.12231°W	—	1798–99	This replaced an earlier Methodist chapel of 1779, and has been converted into a snooker centre. It is built in brick with a Welsh slate roof. The building is expressed as two storeys, and has four bays facing the street, and five bays along the sides. Flanking the chapel are side arches leading to the entrances.	II
2 Spring Gardens; 53.26593°N 2.12580°W	—	1799–1800 (probable)	A brick house with a hipped slate roof. It has a square plan and is in two storeys. The entrance front has three bays with a central round-headed doorway and a fanlight. The windows are sashes, and there is an oriel window at the rear.	II
110–116 Chestergate; 53.26076°N 2.13142°W	—	c. 1800	A terrace of four shops, built in brick with a Welsh slate roof. They are in two storeys and have a front of five bays. In the ground floor are modern shop fronts, and above are sash windows.	II
6 King Edward Street; 53.26131°N 2.12622°W		c. 1800	A house, later used as an office, possibly with an earlier core. It is in brick with a Welsh slate roof, with three storeys and a three-bay front. The doorway is to the left of centre, and to the left of this is a Tuscan pedimented entry. The windows are sashes.	II
2 and 4 Market Place; 53.26133°N 2.12538°W		c. 1800	A pair of shops (now bar and restaurant) with accommodation above, originally houses. They are in brick with a stone-flagged roof, with three storeys and a five-bay front. In the ground floor are modern shop fronts, and above there are sash windows.	II
5 and 7 Market Place; 53.26121°N 2.12573°W		c. 1800	A pair of shops with accommodation above, built in brick. They are in three storeys, and each shop has a two-bay front. In the ground floor are modern shop fronts, and above there are sash windows.	II
6 and 8 Market Place; 53.26120°N 2.12535°W	—	c. 1800	A pair of shops with offices above. They are in brick with a stone-flagged roof, with three storeys and a four-bay front. In the ground floor are modern shop fronts, and above there are sash windows.	II
9 and 9A Market Place; 53.26114°N 2.12573°W		c. 1800	Originally a house, later a shop with accommodation above. It is built in brick with a Welsh slate roof. The building is in three storeys with a five-bay front. It has a central Doric doorcase flanked by shop windows. The windows above are sashes, the central windows having architraves.	II
38 Park Green; 53.25624°N 2.12224°W	—	c. 1800	Originally a house, later used commercially, it is in rendered brick with a Welsh slate roof. The building is in two storeys and a single bay. On the front is a plain doorway and a Palladian window, and above is a sash window.	II
Beech Hall School; 53.26966°N 2.13065°W	—	c. 1800	This was built as a country house, it was extended in 1850–60 and was later converted into use as a school. It is built in brick, some of which is stuccoed, on a plinth, and has roofs of Welsh slate and stone slate. It is in two storeys and has a complex plan. In the entrance front is a porch with a round-arched doorway under a segmental pediment with urn finials. To the left of this is a Venetian window with a pierced balustrade and ball finials.	II
Foden Bank Cottage; 53.24692°N 2.11931°W	—	c. 1800	A house in roughcast brick with a stone-flagged roof. It is in two storeys, and has a five-bay front, with a lower two-bay wing to the left. The doorway has a lattice-work porch, and the windows are sashes.	II
Hurdsfield House; 53.26574°N 2.11546°W	—	c. 1800	This originated as a country house for the Brocklehurst family. It is built in brick with stone dressings and a Welsh slate roof, and is in three storeys. The entrance front is in five bays, the central bay containing a porch with a Doric architrave, over which is a balcony with wrought iron railings. The south front originally had three bays, with a fourth added later. The windows are sashes.	II
Regent Foundry; 53.25993°N 2.13139°W		c. 1800	The former foundry has been converted into flats. It is built in brick with a hipped slate roof. The building has an L-shaped plan, and is in three storeys. There are five bays along Catherine Street and ten bays along Pierce Street, with lower extensions at each end. On the Catherine Street side is a shop front with pilasters.	II
10, 12 and 14 Chestergate; 53.26062°N 2.12634°W		Late 18th or early 19th century	A row of three shops with accommodation above built in brick with a tiled roof. They are in three storeys with a front of six bays. In the ground floor are shop fronts, and above are sash windows. At the angles are painted stone quoins.	II
Little Street Mill and 6–12 Little Street; 53.26130°N 2.12914°W	—	1804	An industrial complex that was extended in 1904 (for victuallers) and again later in the 20th century. It included a silk mill, a dye-house, a warehouse, workshops, and housing for the manager and some of the workers. The buildings are constructed in brick with roofs mainly in Welsh slate. Both the original mill and the 1904 extension are in two storeys with fronts of seven bays.	II
110 Buxton Road; 53.25920°N 2.11760°W	—	c. 1805	A brick house with stuccoed gable ends and a Welsh slate roof. It is in two storeys and has a three-bay front. The central doorway has a Tuscan architrave with an open pediment and a traceried fanlight. The windows are sashes, and there is a semicircular window in one gable apex.	II
106 and 108 Buxton Road; 53.25926°N 2.11788°W	—	c. 1806	No. 106 is the original house with No. 108, a smaller house, being added in about 1850. They are built in brick with a slate roof, and have two storeys. No. 106 is symmetrical with a central doorway having a stone architrave and a traceried fanlight. The windows are sashes.	II
124, 126 and 128 Buxton Road; 53.25904°N 2.11698°W	—	c. 1810	A terrace of three brick houses with Welsh slate roofs in two storeys. Each house has a round-headed doorway with an architrave and a fanlight, one sash window on the ground floor, and two above. In the right gable apex is a semicircular window.	II
136, and 136A Buxton Road; 53.25898°N 2.11653°W	—	c. 1810	A brick house with a Welsh slate roof in two storeys. Originally one house, it was later extended and divided into two dwellings. The original part has a symmetrical three-bay front, and there is an additional bay to the left. The main doorway has an Ionic architrave with a traceried fanlight. The windows are sashes.	II
1–11 Spring Gardens; 53.26567°N 2.12564°W	—	c. 1810	A terrace of six brick houses, one of which is rendered, on a stone plinth with slate roofs. They are in two storeys, and built on a slope with one break in the roof line. Each cottage has a doorway with a reeded architrave, and there is a sash window in each floor.	II
Former Macclesfield Arms Hotel; 53.26154°N 2.12577°W		1811	The former hotel is built in brick with a Welsh slate roof, and has later been known as King Edward House. The main block is in four storeys with a five-bay front. This has a central doorway with a moulded architrave and a fanlight. The block is flanked by two-storey pedimented pavilion wings containing Palladian windows in the upper floor. The other windows are sashes.	II*
Sunday School; 53.25810°N 2.12769°W		1813–14	The former Sunday school has been converted into a heritage centre. It is built in brick with a slate roof, is in four storeys with a ten-bay front, and has a three-storey single-bay extension on the right. The central four bays project forward. There are two entrances flanked by Tuscan columns, and on the top of the building is an inscribed pediment. The windows are sashes.	II*
1 Broken Banks; 53.25533°N 2.12278°W	—	c. 1820	A house with adjoining workshop, built in brick with a slate roof. The house is in two storeys, and the workshop has three storeys. The workshop has been converted into flats. There is a large round-headed stair window at the rear of the house. The other windows are sashes.	II
100, 102, and 104 Buxton Road; 53.25930°N 2.11809°W	—	c. 1820	A row of three brick houses with stone dressings and a slate roof. They are in three storeys, the top storey originally weavers' garrets, and they have a double-pile plan. Each house has a doorway to the right with an architrave and a cornice. The windows in the lower two floors are sashes; in the top floor there is one original horizontal sliding sash and two later casements.	II
35 and 37 Chester Road, 2 Great Queen Street; 53.26013°N 2.13356°W	—	c. 1820	A group of three stone houses with stone-flagged roofs. No. 37 Chester Road is in two storeys with two bays. It has a rusticated porch with round head. The other houses are in three storeys and in three bays. Above the doorway of No. 35 is a cornice hood. The doorway to No. 2 Great Queen Street has an architrave and an entablature. The windows are sashes.	II
Birch House and 10 Waterloo Road; 53.25848°N 2.13002°W	—	c. 1820	A pair of brick houses with a stone-flagged roof on a corner, originally three houses, later two. They are in three storeys, with three bays on Bridge Street and six on Waterloo Road. On each front is a Tuscan pedimented doorcase approached by steps with railings. The windows are sashes, with an oriel window on the Waterloo Road front.	II
Kendal House; 53.25203°N 2.15494°W	—	c. 1820	A house that was extended in 1895 and later used as offices. It is built in stuccoed brick with a Welsh slate roof. The house is in two storeys with a double-pile plan. The entrance front is in three bays, the central bay being recessed and containing a porch with Ionic columns. The windows are sashes. On the garden front is a full-height bow window.	II
Regency Mill; 53.25962°N 2.13765°W		c. 1820	The former silk mill is built in brick with a Welsh slate roof. Its main block is in four storeys with a basement, and it has a 17-bay front. The central five bays project forward under a pediment containing a clock, and is surmounted by a cupola. The original doorway has a Doric doorcase. The windows are sashes. Ancillary buildings, including weaving sheds and an engine house are at the rear.	II
Upton Grange; 53.27149°N 2.15313°W	—	c. 1820	A stuccoed house with a Welsh slate roof, altered in the 20th century and used as a nursing home. It is in two storeys and has a three-bay entrance front with a central Ionic porch. On the right is a four-bay front. The windows are sashes.	II
Boundary stone 53.25851°N 2.07420°W	—	1822	The parish boundary stone consists of a sandstone block with a semicircular head. It is inscribed with the date and "M" (for Macclesfield).	II
St George's Church; 53.25374°N 2.12376°W		1822–23	This was built as an independent church, then became Anglican, with a chancel added in 1834. It was later declared redundant and was converted into offices and a flat. The building is in brick with stone dressings and a Welsh slate roof, and is in Neoclassical style. The entrance front has a Tuscan portico, above which is a Venetian window. Along the sides are two tiers of sash windows, and there is another Venetian window at the rear. Inside a U-shaped gallery has been retained.	II
Upper Paradise Mill; 53.25554°N 2.12488°W	—	1822–24	The former silk mill is built in brick with a Welsh slate roof. It is in five storeys, and has a front of eight bays. On the left is an entry with a segmental head, and at the rear are a stair tower and a privy tower. The internal structure consists of timber beams supported by cast iron columns.	II
Brunswick House; 53.25390°N 2.12300°W		1823	This originated as Brunswick Methodist Church, it closed in 1986, and has been converted into offices. It is built in brick with a slate roof. The chapel is in two storeys, and has an entrance front of five bays, the central three bays are pedimented and project forward. It has a segmental Tuscan porch and three doorways. There are seven bays along the sides, and the round-headed windows are in two tiers.	II*
Brunswick Court; 53.25382°N 2.12325°W	—	c. 1823	This originated as a Sunday school and has been converted into flats. It is built in brick with slate roofs, and is in two storeys. The entrance front on Chapel Street has three bays with pilasters between the bays and a pediment over the central bay. This bay contains a doorway with two doors and an architrave with a triglyph frieze. Along the sides are taller blocks at each end, one with a single bay, the other in three bays, and five bays between them. There are two tiers of windows, those in the lower tier having flat heads, and those above with round heads.	II
Alma Mill; 53.25902°N 2.13515°W		c. 1823	A former silk weaving mill built in brick with a Welsh slate roof. It is in three storeys with a basement, and has three bays on the front and eight on the sides. There is a gable facing the street and a flat roof to the right over loading bays. The doorway has a moulded architrave and the windows are transomed.	II
Town Hall; 53.26055°N 2.12532°W		1823–24	This was designed by Francis Goodwin in Greek Revival style with a front facing south, and was extended in 1869–71 in a similar style by James Stevens, with a longer front facing west. There was a further extension in 1991–92. On both fronts there is a similar portico in Ionic style with four unfluted columns and a pediment. Inside the town hall, the assembly room contains six similar Ionic columns running along each side.	II*
Victoria Mills; 53.25412°N 2.12083°W		1825	The mills are in brick with Welsh slate roofs, and were built in two phases, the second phase being added in 1837. The northern section is in four storeys and 13 bays, including a wide gabled bay. The southern section is in five storeys, with 14 bays at the rear and seven at the front.	II
17–25 Back Wallgate; 53.25934°N 2.12494°W		Early 19th century	A terrace of five houses and shops in brick with Welsh slate roofs. They are in two storeys, and each unit has a doorway and sash windows.	II
33, 35 and 37 Blakelow Road; 53.25249°N 2.11187°W	—	Early 19th century	A group of three joined houses in three ranges, two parallel to the road, and the other at right angles to them. They are in brick, partly rendered, and with stone flagged roofs. The windows are sashes.	II
25–33 Brunswick Terrace; 53.26134°N 2.12397°W	—	Early 19th century	A terrace of six brick houses with Welsh slate roofs. No 25 is in three storeys, and the others have two. Each house has a doorway with a round-headed architrave and a fanlight. All the windows are sashes.	II
34, 36, 36A and 38 Chestergate; 53.26069°N 2.12730°W		Early 19th century	A row of three brick shops with a slate roof. They are in three storeys, and have a three-bay front. There is an additional narrow bay containing a passage to the right. The ground floor contains 20th-century shop fronts, and the windows are sashes with flat-arched heads and keystones.	II
40 and 42 Chestergate; 53.26072°N 2.12748°W		Early 19th century	A pair of shops with accommodation above, built in brick with a slate roof. They are in three storeys with shop fronts on the ground floor and sash windows above.	II
44, 46 and 48 Chestergate; 53.26078°N 2.12775°W		Early 19th century	A row of stuccoed brick shops with accommodation above, and with a slate roof. They are in three storeys and have four-bay front. In the ground floor are shop fronts, and above are sash windows.	II
122A and 122B Chestergate; 53.26077°N 2.13189°W	—	Early 19th century	Two shops with accommodation above in rendered brick with stone dressings and a Welsh slate roof. They are in three storeys with shop fronts in the ground floor and sash windows above.	II
7 Churchside; 53.26046°N 2.12456°W		Early 19th century	The building may have an earlier core. It originated as a house, and was later used as offices. The building is in brick with a Welsh slate roof, is in three storeys, and has a two-bay front. There is a central doorway with a round-headed stone architrave that is flanked by three-light windows. The other windows are sashes.	II
9–17 Churchside; 53.26046°N 2.12429°W		Early 19th century	A terrace of five brick houses with Welsh slate roofs, later used as offices. They stand on a stone plinth, are in two storeys, and have a double-pile plan. Each house has a doorway in a round-headed-architrave and sash windows.	II
31, 33 and 35 Churchside; 53.26002°N 2.12427°W		Early 19th century	A terrace of three brick houses with stone dressings and a Welsh slate roof. They have a double-pile plan, are in two storeys, and each house has a single bay. The doorways have architraves, and the windows are sashes.	II
37 and 39 Churchside; 53.25996°N 2.12467°W		Early 19th century	A pair of brick houses with a Welsh slate roof. They have a double-pile plan, and are in two storeys. The doorways have round-headed reeded architraves with fanlights, and the windows are sashes. There is another doorway on the right to a passage.	II
41 Churchside; 53.25997°N 2.12462°W	—	Early 19th century	Originally a house, later used as an office, it is built in brick with a Welsh slate roof. It is in two storeys and has a two-bay front. There is a central doorway with a round-headed stone architrave and a fanlight. The windows are sashes.	II
43 and 43A Churchside; 53.25993°N 2.12480°W		Early 19th century (probable)	A pair of brick houses, later used as offices, with stone-flagged roofs in two storeys. The main block, No. 43, is in three bays with a central enriched Tuscan doorcase. The windows are sashes. No. 43A forms a single-bay pavilion to the right and contains a plain doorway and three-light windows in each storey.	II
47 and 47A Churchside; 53.25997°N 2.12498°W		Early 19th century (probable)	A house, later used as offices, which may have an earlier core, and with later alterations. It is roughcast over brick or timber framing. The building is in two storeys with a parapet, and has a three-bay front. In the ground floor are shop fronts and above are sash windows.	II
5–21 Church Street; 53.25975°N 2.12529°W		Early 19th century	A terrace of seven brick shops with slate roofs, built on a sloping site and stepped. They are in two storeys, and have a front of eleven bays. In the ground floor are shop fronts and two passages. The windows in the upper storey are sashes.	II
3 Jordangate; 53.26191°N 2.12587°W	—	Early 19th century	A brick house with a Welsh slate roof. It is in three storeys and has a three-bay front. The central bay is narrower and recessed, and contains a doorcase with an open pediment. The windows are sashes.	II
36 Jordangate; 53.26276°N 2.12573°W		Early 19th century	A brick house with a Welsh slate roof. It is in two storeys and has a two-bay front. The doorway is round-headed with a fanlight, and to the left of this is a round-headed passage entry. In the ground floor is a bow window, and in the upper floor the windows are sashes.	II
79, 81 and 83 Mill Street; 53.25785°N 2.12589°W	—	Early 19th century	A row of three brick shops with stone-flagged roofs. They are in three storeys, with seven bays facing Mill Street and two facing Roe Street. In the ground floor are modern shop fronts, and above are sash windows with painted stone voussoir heads.	II
57 Roe Street; 53.25772°N 2.12855°W	—	Early 19th century	A brick house with a stone-flagged roof. It is in three storeys and has a three-bay front. The doorway has a round arch and a fanlight. All the windows are sashes, those in the ground floor having round-arched heads.	II
59 Roe Street; 53.25772°N 2.12875°W	—	Early 19th century	A pair of brick houses with a stone-flagged roof. They are in three storeys and have a five-bay front. There are two doorways with fanlights, one of which has a moulded architrave, and the other has an open pediment. The windows are sashes.	II
63 and 65 Roe Street; 53.25775°N 2.12895°W	—	Early 19th century	A pair of brick houses with concrete tile roofs. They are in three storeys, and each house has a single-bay front. The doorways have moulded architraves with clustered shafts and fanlights. The windows are sashes.	II
65A and 67 Roe Street; 53.25777°N 2.12913°W	—	Early 19th century	A brick house with a stone-flagged roof, later in commercial use. It is in two storeys with an attic, and has a front of five bays. The original doorway has a moulded doorcase and a fanlight. To the left is an inserted plain doorway. The windows are sashes.	II
43 and 45 Sunderland Street; 53.25767°N 2.12267°W	—	Early 19th century	A pair of brick shops with a Welsh slate roof. They are in two storeys. In the lower floor are shop fronts and doorcase with a pediment decorated with a frieze and festoons. The windows are sashes.	II
Railings and bollards, Brunswick Hill Steps; 53.26145°N 2.12421°W		Early 19th century	The structures are all in cast iron. They consist of a line of round posts with square caps carrying a tubular rail. At the top of the slope are three bollards.	II
Fina Bar and Grill (formerly Bull's Head Public House); 53.26098°N 2.12570°W		Early 19th century	A stuccoed and roughcast building with a Welsh slate roof. It is in two storeys and has a four-bay front. On the left of the ground floor is a passageway, to the right of which are three mullioned and transomed windows and a doorway. In the upper floor are sash windows.	II
Byronswood Cottage; 53.24393°N 2.11571°W	—	Early 19th century	A house in rendered brick with a slate roof. It is in two storeys, and has a symmetrical three-bay front. The central doorway has a moulded architrave with a pediment. The windows are sashes. At the eaves is a dentilled cornice.	II
Wall, railings, gate pier, Cumberland House; 53.26228°N 2.12589°W	—	Early 19th century	The walls are in stone, and the railings are in cast iron, with spear heads. The single gate pier is in ashlar, and is rusticated.	II
The Town House; 53.26154°N 2.12693°W		Early 19th century	A public house built in brick with a concrete-tiled roof. It is in three storeys with a three-bay front. The central entrance has a pedimented doorcase, and the windows are sashes.	II
Walls, railings, gates and gate piers, St Michael's Church; 53.26027°N 2.12519°W		Early 19th century	The stone walls carry cast iron railings with spearheads, the principal rails being surmounted by urns. There are two pairs of gate piers, between which are main and flanking gates. The gate piers are in stone with moulded cornices, the central pair topped by urns. The cast iron gates and overthrow are elaborately decorated, including a gilded sun motif.	II
Short Street Mill and public house 53.25980°N 2.12362°W	—	Early 19th century	The public house was built adjoining the mill in about 1840–50. The whole building is in brick, with roofs of stone-flags and Welsh slate. The former mill has two storeys at the front and four at the back; the upper two storeys have been converted into cottages, and the rest have been incorporated into the public house. The windows are a mix of casements and sashes.	II
Upton Hall and Farm; 53.27179°N 2.14982°W	—	Early 19th century	A hall and farm in brick with stone-flagged roofs. It has a courtyard plan with the former hall on the east side, later divided into two dwellings with sash windows. The rest of the complex is in agricultural use.	II
Former coach house, Whitfield House; 53.26448°N 2.14148°W	—	Early 19th century	The former coach house is built in stone with a slate roof. It is in a single storey with a hay loft above. There are two windows with a pitch hole over them.	II
Crompton Road Mill; 53.25901°N 2.13506°W		c. 1825	The former mill is built in brick and has a roof of corrugated sheeting. It is on a sloping site, and has 3–5 storeys. The main range extends for twelve bays. The entrance is through a round-arched doorway with a loading bay and hoist above. All the windows are transomed.	II
Thorpe Street Mill; 53.26164°N 2.12211°W	—	c. 1825	A former silk mill converted for other uses. It is built in brick on a stone plinth and has a roof of stone flags and Welsh slates. The building is in three storeys, and has a front of 13 bays with an engine house at the rear. Four doorways have been inserted, and the windows are sashes.	II
Former St Alban's Parochial Hall; 53.25801°N 2.12884°W	—	1828–29	Originally built as a Kidd's Chapel, later used as a parochial hall, and after that by the Salvation Army. It is a stuccoed building with a slate roof, and is in two storeys. The front has five bays, the middle three bays projecting forward and divided by Corinthian pilasters. In front of these is a Doric portico containing three doors with moulded architraves. Along the sides are five arcaded bays. The windows are sashes, those in the upper storey having round heads.	II
38 Bridge Street, 26, 28 and 30 Great King Street; 53.25933°N 2.12954°W	—	c. 1830	A group of four brick houses with Welsh slate roofs standing on corner site. They are in three storeys. The doorway on the Bridge Street front has a doorcase with Tuscan pilasters and an open pediment. On the Great King Street front is a doorway with a moulded architrave, a round-headed doorway, a segmental-headed carriage entry, and a modern shop front. The windows are sashes.	II
102 and 104 Bridge Street; 53.25678°N 2.13010°W	—	c. 1830	A pair of brick houses with Welsh slate roofs. They are in three storeys, the top storey forming a weaver's garret, and have a double-pile plan. Each house has a central round-headed doorway approached by steps, and between the houses is a round-headed entry. The windows are sashes.	II
8 and 10 Chapel Street; 53.25394°N 2.12230°W	—	c. 1830	A pair of brick houses with a Welsh slate roof and weavers' garrets. They are in three storeys and have a three-bay front. The entrances are paired having round-headed stone architraves with keystones and fanlights. The windows are sashes, and at the rear is a long weavers' window in the top floor.	II
43 Chapel Street, 41 St George's Street; 53.25352°N 2.12339°W	—	c. 1830	A pair of brick houses on a corner site with a hipped slate roof. They are in two storeys, and each house has a two-bay front. There is a shop front on the side facing St George's Street. The windows are sashes.	II
51 and 53 Chapel Street, 38 High Street; 53.25342°N 2.12376°W	—	c. 1830	Three brick houses with a Welsh slate roof. They are in two storeys, with six bays on Chapel Street and three bays facing High Street. The doorways have reeded architraves and fanlights, and the windows are sashes.	II
120 and 122 High Street; 53.25144°N 2.12286°W	—	c. 1830	A pair of brick houses with former weavers' garrets. They are in three storeys, and have a double-pile plan. The doorways have stone architraves and fanlights. The windows are sashes, those in the top storey being long with horizontal sliding sashes.	II
25–31 Park Street, 2 High Street; 53.25481°N 2.12452°W	—	c. 1830	A terrace of five brick houses in three storeys. The doorways have fluted pilasters and fanlights, and the windows are sashes.	II
34–42 Pool Street; 53.25279°N 2.12075°W	—	c. 1830	A terrace of five houses with weavers' garrets, built in brick with a Welsh slate roof, and originally back-to-back. They are in three storeys, each house having a single bay. The doorways are round-headed and the windows are sashes. Along the top floor, at the front and rear, are long workshop windows.	II
30, 30A and 32 Townley Street; 53.25698°N 2.12369°W	—	c. 1830	A row of three houses with a former weavers' garret. They are built in brick with a Welsh slate roof. The building has three storeys and four bays. There are three doorways towards the centre, the middle one leading to the upper floor. The windows in the lower storeys are sashes. In the top floor are three long windows, originally with horizontal sliding sashes.	II
Lord Byron Public House; 53.25359°N 2.12309°W		c. 1830	A public house with three attached houses, built in brick with Welsh slate roofs. The public house and the first two houses have two storeys, and the third house has three. They all have round-arched doorways and sash windows.	II
Walls, railings and gates Methodist Church; 53.25377°N 2.12286°W	—	c. 1830	The walls are in brick with stone copings, and the cast iron railings have spear heads. There are two pairs of stone gate piers with cast iron gates.	II
Union Mill; 53.25733°N 2.11478°W		c. 1830	Originally a flour mill, it is built in brick with a Welsh slate roof. The mill has five storeys, and is 17 bays long by three bays deep. To the right is the former boiler house. Most of the windows are later casements, but there are earlier sash windows in the top storey.	II
Bridge No 33; 53.27012°N 2.10705°W		1831	A footbridge over the Macclesfield Canal, for which the engineer was William Crosley. It is built in Kerridge stone, and consists of a single elliptical arch with voussoirs, keystones, parapets, and terminal piers.	II
Bridge No 35; 53.26352°N 2.10705°W		1831	A bridge carrying Higher Fence Road over the Macclesfield Canal, for which the engineer was William Crosley. It is a skew bridge, built in Kerridge stone, and consists of a single elliptical arch with voussoirs, keystones, parapets, and terminal piers.	II
Bridge No 36; 53.26047°N 2.11097°W		1831	A footbridge over the Macclesfield Canal, for which the engineer was William Crosley. It is built in Kerridge stone, and consists of a single elliptical arch with voussoirs, keystones, parapets, and terminal piers.	II
Bridge No 38; 53.25564°N 2.11388°W		1831	A bridge carrying Black Road over the Macclesfield Canal, for which the engineer was William Crosley. It is a skew bridge, built in Kerridge stone, and consists of a single elliptical arch with voussoirs, keystones, raking parapets, and projecting terminal piers.	II
Bridge No 39; 53.25442°N 2.11374°W		1831	A bridge carrying a road over the Macclesfield Canal, for which the engineer was William Crosley. It is built in Kerridge stone, and consists of a single elliptical arch with voussoirs, keystones, raking parapets, and projecting terminal piers.	II
Bridge No 40; 53.25270°N 2.11466°W		1831	A bridge carrying Windmill Street over the Macclesfield Canal, for which the engineer was William Crosley. It is built in Kerridge stone, and consists of a single steep sided elliptical arch with voussoirs, keystones, raking parapets, and projecting terminal piers.	II
Bridge No 41; 53.25203°N 2.11513°W		1831	A bridge carrying a road, Richmond Hill, over the Macclesfield Canal, for which the engineer was William Crosley. It is built in Kerridge stone, and consists of a single steep sided elliptical arch with voussoirs, keystones, raking parapets, and projecting terminal piers.	II
Bridge No 44; 53.24057°N 2.11611°W		1831	A bridge carrying Bullocks Lane over the Macclesfield Canal, for which the engineer was William Crosley. It is a skew bridge, built in Kerridge stone, and consists of a single elliptical arch with voussoirs, keystones, parapets, and terminal piers.	II
Canal milestone 53.24438°N 2.11404°W	—	c. 1831	A block of stone with a shaped top by the towpath of the Macclesfield Canal. It is inscribed with the distances in miles from Marple and from Hall Green.	II
St George's School; 53.25328°N 2.12406°W	—	1835	A Church of England school designed by William Grellier in Neoclassical style, and later converted into houses. It is built in brick with stone dressings and has a slate roof. The building is in two storeys and with a front of five bays. The outer bays have pediments and Tuscan pilasters.	II
Parish boundary stone 53.26015°N 2.11830°W	—	Early to mid-19th century	The boundary stone is in Victoria Park. It consists of a block with a semicircular head. The stone is badly worn and its inscription is not legible.	II
Parish boundary stone 53.25387°N 2.12434°W	—	Early to mid-19th century	The boundary stone is adjacent to a playground wall in St George's Place. It is a small stone block with a semicircular head and is inscribed with "M" (for Macclesfield).	II
Three bollards, Byron Street; 53.25004°N 2.12041°W	—	Early to mid-19th century	The three bollards are in cast iron. They are fluted and tapered, and have fluted conical tops.	II
Bollard, Chestergate; 53.26087°N 2.12760°W		Early to mid-19th century	The bollard stands between 41 and 43 Chestergate. It is in cast iron and has a fluted shaft with a rounded top.	II
Former Methodist Chapel; 53.25449°N 2.12500°W	—	1836	Built for the Methodist New Connexion, this was used later as a printing works. It is built in brick with stone dressings and a Welsh slate roof, and is in Neoclassical style. The chapel is in two storeys, and on the Park Road front are five bays, the central three bays projecting forward, plus an outer recessed single bay on each side. In the outer bays are Doric doorcases. On the High Street front are five bays with two tiers of windows. The right bay projects forward with a pediment, and in the left bay is a doorway, beyond which is a projecting two-storey block.	II
Holy Trinity Church; 53.26434°N 2.11288°W		1838–39	The church was designed by William Hayley, and is in Gothic Revival style. It is built in stone with a slate roof. The church consists of a nave and a chancel with an enclosed west tower. The tower has buttresses rising to pinnacles, a west door, and an embattled parapet. Along the sides are stepped lancet windows, and the east window contains Decorated tracery.	II
Whitfield House; 53.26435°N 2.14128°W	—	c. 1838	A stone house with a slate roof. It is in two storeys and has a three-bay front, the central bay protruding slightly forward with a pediment. The central doorway has a moulded doorcase and a traceried fanlight. At the corners are pilasters, and the windows are sashes.	II*
Newton Terrace, 253–259 Park Lane; 53.25318°N 2.13273°W		1839	A terrace of four brick houses with stone dressings and a Welsh slate roof. They are in three storeys, and each house has a three-, the left bay of No. 259 consisting of a full-height bow window. Nos. 253 and 255 have pedimented doorcases; the doorways of Nos. 257 and 259 are round-headed with fanlights. The windows are sashes.	II
St Alban's Church; 53.25995°N 2.13401°W		1839–41	A Roman Catholic church designed by A. W. N. Pugin. It is built in stone with a Welsh slate roof, and is in Perpendicular style. The church consists of a nave, aisles, a chancel, a south chapel, a porch, a vestry, and an unfinished tower at the west end. The pulpit and the altarpiece in the chapel were designed by E. W. Pugin.	II*
55–63 Chapel Street; 53.25313°N 2.12497°W	—	c. 1840	A row of five former weavers' houses. They are in brick with slate roofs, and have three storeys. The doorway to No. 55 has an architrave and an entablature; the other doors have round heads without an architrave. The windows are sashes.	II
7 and 9 Cross Street; 53.25160°N 2.12142°W	—	c. 1840	A pair of brick houses with Welsh slate roofs. They are in three storeys, and each house has a two-bay front. In the ground floor are shop fronts, the middle storey contains sash windows, and in the top floor are long workshop windows.	II
1, 3 and 5 James Street; 53.25434°N 2.12569°W	—	c. 1840	A terrace of three brick houses with Welsh slate roofs. They are in two storeys, and each house has a two-bay front. The doorways have reeded architraves and fanlights, and the windows are sashes.	II
21–27 Lord Street; 53.25470°N 2.12341°W	—	c. 1840	A terrace of four brick houses with a slate roof and weavers' garrets. They are in three storeys, and each house has a single-bay front. The doorways have simple architraves. The windows in the lower two storeys are sashes, and in the top storey there are horizontal sliding long sash windows.	II
22 and 24 Lord Street; 53.25484°N 2.12322°W	—	c. 1840	A pair of brick houses with a slate roof and weavers' garrets. They are in three storeys with round-headed doorways and fanlights. The windows in the lower two storeys are sashes, and in the top storey there are long windows.	II
38–70 Paradise Street; 53.25651°N 2.12972°W		c. 1840	A row of 17 houses with weavers' garrets, stepped to correspond to their sloping site. They are constructed in brick with Welsh slate roofs. The houses are in three storeys and have a double-pile plan; each house is in a single bay. All the houses have a round-headed doorway, some with steps and rails leading up to it. The windows in the lower two storeys are sashes, and in the top storey there are long windows with horizontal sliding sashes.	II
92 Paradise Street; 53.25669°N 2.13108°W		c. 1840	A house with a weavers' garret, built in brick with some slate hanging, and a Welsh slate roof. It has a double-pile plan, and it is in three storeys with a single bay. There is a round-arched doorway to the right and sash windows in the lower two storeys. In the top floor is a long window with a horizontal sliding sash window.	II
80–96 Park Lane; 53.25436°N 2.12602°W	—	c. 1840	A terrace of six houses with a shop at each end forming a projecting bay. They are built in brick with Welsh slate roofs, the shops having hip roofs. Each house has a round-headed doorway with a simple architrave and a traceried fanlight. There are shop fronts on the shops, and the other windows are sashes.	II
126–132 Park Lane; 53.25405°N 2.12760°W	—	c. 1840	A terrace of four houses with weavers' garrets. They are constructed in brick with Welsh slate roofs. The houses are in three storeys and have a double-pile plan; each house is in a single bay. All the houses have a round-headed doorway with a fanlight. The windows in the lower two storeys are sashes, and in the top storey there are long windows with horizontal sliding sashes.	II
1 Park Street; 53.25559°N 2.12329°W	—	c. 1840	A brick house with stone dressings and a Welsh slate roof. It is in two storeys and has a three-bay front, the central bay projecting forward and pedimented. In the centre is a portico carried on Corinthian columns, and above the doorway is a segmental fanlight. The windows are sashes. The central window is in a moulded architrave with an entablature on console brackets. The other windows have stone heads with keystones.	II
59 and 61 Prestbury Road, 4 Walker Street; 53.26181°N 2.13459°W		c. 1840	A group of three houses on a corner site, mainly in brick with a Welsh slate roof, and in two storeys. Along Walker Street are five bays, with a doorway in the second bay. On Prestbury Road there are three symmetrical bays with a central doorway, followed by a full-height stone canted bay window, and another doorway. The doorways have fluted Ionic pilasters and fanlights, and the windows are sashes.	II
46 Vincent Street; 53.25469°N 2.12709°W	—	c. 1840	A brick house on a stone plinth with a slate roof. It is in three storeys and has a two-bay front. The doorcase has fluted pilasters and a pediment, and the windows are sashes.	II
Brown Street Mill; 53.25502°N 2.12974°W		c. 1840	A former mill in brick with a hipped slate roof. It has an L-shaped plan with seven bays on Brown Street and eleven on Statham Street. The mill has four storeys. The main doorway has a stuccoed architrave with an entablature and a shallow pediment. There are plain pilasters at the corners and one to the left of the doorway.	II
Park Lane House; 53.25370°N 2.12968°W	—	c. 1840	A brick house with a Welsh slate roof, it is in two storeys and has a three-bay front, the central bay projecting lightly forwards. There is a fluted Ionic doorcase with a fanlight. Between the floors is a continuous sill band.	II
Social Services Department; 53.26131°N 2.12654°W	—	c. 1840	This was built as the county police office, than used by the local authority. It is built in stone with Welsh slate roofs, and is in Gothic style. It is in two storeys, and has a seven-bay front, the outer and central bays protruding forward and gabled. The windows are all arched and mullioned. In front of the building are walls, railings and gate piers that are included in the listing.	II
St George's House; 53.25490°N 2.12438°W	—	c. 1840	A house for the owner of St George's Street Mill and integral to it. The house is built in brick with a Welsh slate roof. It is in three storeys and has a three-bay front. Steps lead up to the central entrance that has a doorway with a reeded architrave and a fanlight. The windows are sashes.	II
St George's Street Mill; 53.25477°N 2.12423°W	—	c. 1840	This consists of a former silk mill converted into offices and two attached houses. The building is in brick with a Welsh slate roof, and is in three storeys. The mill has a six-bay front, with an entry in the left bay. Both houses have a single bay. There are round-headed doorways with fanlights in both houses and in the right bay of the former mill. Most of the windows are mullioned and transomed, and there are long weavers' windows in the top storey at the rear.	II
Barclay's Bank; 53.25676°N 2.12390°W		1841–42	Built as a savings bank, this is in Neoclassical style. It is constructed in stone and has two storeys. On the front is a Greek Doric portico with four fluted columns without bases, a triglyph frieze, and a pediment. There is a central doorway and the windows are sashes.	II*
Albion Mill; 53.24915°N 2.12111°W		1843	A former silk mill built in brick on a stone basement, with stone dressings and a slate roof. The main block is in four storeys with a basement and extends for 15 bays, the central five bays projecting slightly forward. Above the central bays is a parapet with an inscribed panel. At the rear are two stair towers and a privy tower. To the east is a later extension in six storeys and four bays.	II
St Paul's Church; 53.25727°N 2.11962°W		1843–44	This was a Commissioners' church designed by William Hayley. It is constructed in stone with slate roof, and is in Perpendicular style. The church consists of nave with a clerestory, north and south aisles, and a chancel. At the west end is a tower with pinnacles, and a recessed spire with lucarnes.	II
General Hospital; 53.26228°N 2.13793°W	—	1843–45	This was built as a workhouse designed by Scott and Moffatt. It is constructed in stone with patterned tiles and has three storeys. The plan is of a long range with projecting wings. There is a central gabled porch with pinnacles. On the centre of the building is a lantern with a clock. Most of the windows are mullioned.	II
Prestbury Road Terrace; 53.26146°N 2.13442°W	—	1845	A terrace of eight houses, built in brick on a stone plinth with stone dressings and a Welsh slate roof. The terrace is in two storeys, and the central bay protrudes under a pediment. The doorways have moulded architraves with consoles supporting entablatures. The windows are sashes.	II
St Paul's School; 53.25752°N 2.11908°W	—	c. 1845	This was built as a Church of England primary school, and was later converted into flats. It is constructed in stone with a slate roof, and is in Gothic style. The building is in two storeys with a gable, and the windows are mullioned and transomed.	II
Memorial to John Whitaker; 53.25792°N 2.12767°W	—	1846	The memorial commemorates John Whitaker, the founder of Macclesfield Sunday School, and was unveiled on its fiftieth anniversary in the forecourt of the school. It was designed by Alfred Gatley, and is in stone and marble. The memorial consists of a pedestal with a cornice decorated with acroteria, on top of which is a draped urn. On the south face is a medallion containing a bust of Whitaker in low relief and an inscription.	II
Park Grange; 53.25292°N 2.13290°W	—	1848	A terrace of six brick houses with stone dressings and a Welsh slate roof. The terrace is in two storeys and has a front of 14 bays, the right bay projecting forward. Each house has a fluted Ionic doorcase with a fanlight. The windows are mullioned and transomed, each in an architrave with a shallow pedimented head.	II
Boundary stone 53.25450°N 2.12399°W	—	1849	The stone marking the boundary between two parishes is set at ground level into the wall between 13 and 15 St George's Street. It has a semicircular head and is inscribed with the date and the letter "M".	II
Boundary stone 53.25128°N 2.11826°W	—	1849	A stone with a semicircular head marking a parish boundary at the junction of Gunco Lane and Heapy Street. It is inscribed with the date and the letter "M" for Macclesfield.	II
Boundary stone 53.25420°N 2.12460°W	—	1849	The boundary stone is in the front wall of No. 7 High Street. It has a semicircular head and is inscribed with the date and the letter "M" for Macclesfield.	II
St Peter's Church; 53.25340°N 2.11786°W		1849	This is a Commissioners' church designed by Charles and James Trubshaw, and it was re-ordered in 2005. It is built in stone with tiled roofs, and is in Early English style. The church consists of a nave with a clerestory, aisles, a chancel, a vestry, and a southwest tower. The tower has an embattled parapet with corner pinnacles, and in the clerestory are gabled dormers.	II
Lark Hill Yard; 53.25845°N 2.10558°W	—	Mid-19th century	A brick cottage with a slate roof. It is in two storeys and has three bays. The doorway has a moulded architrave, and the windows are sashes.	II
31 Great King Street; 53.25947°N 2.12953°W	—	c. 1850	A brick house with a hipped Welsh slate roof. It is in two storeys with a symmetrical three- front, and three bays on the left side. The central doorway has a moulded architrave and a fanlight containing stained glass. The windows are sashes.	II
56 and 58 Mill Lane; 53.25360°N 2.12151°W	—	c. 1850	A pair of brick houses with a Welsh slate roof, incorporating weavers' garrets. The building is in three storeys with an attic, and each house has a two-bay front. In the ground floor are shop fronts, and the upper two storeys contain sash windows. The attic has a continuous run of horizontal sliding sash windows.	II
Mount Pleasant; 53.26596°N 2.14329°W	—	c. 1850	A terrace of eight houses in brick with stone dressings and a Welsh slate roof. They are in two storeys with a basement. Each house has a round-headed doorway with an architrave. In the lower floor are canted bay windows with casements, and in the upper floor the windows are sashes.	II
Presbytery, St Alban's Church; 53.26001°N 2.13379°W	—	c. 1850	The presbytery is linked to the church by a porch. It is built in stone with Welsh slate roofs. The presbytery was designed by A. W. N. Pugin in Gothic style. It is in two storeys and has an irregular plan. There is a gable facing the road containing a mullioned and transomed window in each floor, and a dormer in the gable. On the right side is a full-height canted bay with a pyramidal roof. This contains a two-light mullioned window in each floor, and a dormer in the gable.	II
Byrons Mill; 53.24859°N 2.12156°W		c. 1850–60	A silk mill built in brick on a basement and ground floor of stone, with dressings in brick and stone, and a Welsh slate roof. It is in four storeys and a basement, with a 15-bay front, the middle five bays protruding lightly forward. At the angles are brick pilasters with stone caps. The entrance is in the gable end, and at the rear are two towers with an engine house between them.	II
Park Mill; 53.25212°N 2.12634°W		1853	A former silk mill built in brick on a stone plinth with a Welsh slate roof. It has two storeys and is in two ranges, the range facing south has 19 bays, and the range facing Hobson Street has 11 bays. The entrance is on Hobson Street, and has a stone architrave above which is a tablet inscribed with the date.	II
King's School (original block); 53.26308°N 2.13031°W	—	1854–56	There have been later alterations and additions. This block was designed by F. Bellhouse, and is built in stone with slate roofs. The building is gabled, and has mullioned and transomed windows.	II
Armoury Towers; 53.25394°N 2.13675°W		1855–65	This was built as the militia headquarters, and was converted into flats in the 1980s. It is in Tudorbethan style, built in stone, and with a hipped tile roof. The building has three storeys, and a five-bay front. At each end is a round stair tower with a conical roof. The central three bays of the ground floor form an arcade with a central doorway. The windows are mullioned and transomed.	II
Evington House; 53.25381°N 2.13640°W	—	1855–65	A stone house within the Barracks with a tiled roof, designed in Tudorbethan style. It has a double-pile plan, and is in two storeys. There is an irregular two-bay front with two gables of different sizes, the larger one containing a bay window. The windows are mullioned and transomed or mullioned. The rear perimeter wall and its terminal pier are included in the designation.	II
Gatehouse, the Barracks; 53.25354°N 2.13627°W		1855–65	Originally the gatehouse to the militia barracks, it was converted into houses in the 1980s. It is constructed in sandstone with tiled roofs, and is in Tudorbethan style. The building is in a single storey with an attic, and incorporates an entrance with a pointed archway, gabled half-dormers, a round stair tower with a conical roof and a finial. The perimeter wall of the barracks is included in the designation.	II
Works building, the Barracks; 53.25401°N 2.13707°W	—	1855–65	Originally a house, then a workshop, and reconverted into a house in the 1980s. It is constructed in sandstone with tiled roofs, and is in Tudorbethan style. The house has a single storey with an attic, and a front with a large gable flanked by gabled half-dormers. The windows are mullioned and contain casements.	II
Lodge, King's School; 53.26270°N 2.13273°W	—	c.1856	The lodge is built in stone with a Welsh slate roof. It has an L-shaped plan, with a porch in a lean-to at the west end. The windows are mullioned or mullioned and transomed, some of them in dormers.	II
33–39 Great King Street; 53.25951°N 2.13004°W	—	c.1860	This was built as a school, and used later as offices by the local authority. It is constructed in stone with a Welsh slate roof, and is in Tudor style. The building has two storeys and an asymmetrical gabled front. The windows are mullioned and transomed or mullioned, with a lancet window in each gable.	II
1–4 The Barracks and the Lodge; 53.25327°N 2.13714°W	—	c. 1860	These were originally the buildings on the south side of the parade ground of the militia barracks, and were converted into flats in the 1980s. They are built in sandstone with tiled roofs, and are in Tudorbethan style. The buildings are in 1½ storeys, and include an octagonal tower, mullioned windows containing casements, and gabled half-dormers.	II
The Barracks and rear perimeter wall 53.25367°N 2.13736°W		c. 1860	These were originally the buildings on the west side of the parade ground of the militia barracks, and were converted into flats in the 1980s. They are built in sandstone with tiled roofs, and are in Tudorbethan style. The buildings are in 1½ storeys, and form a long symmetrical range that include archways, gables, and half-dormers. Above the central gable is a square turret containing a clock and topped by a pyramidal roof. The rear stone perimeter wall is included in the listing.	II
Cemetery Lodge and gates 53.26402°N 2.13861°W		c. 1860–70	The lodge is built in stone with a Welsh slate roof, was designed by James Stevens, and is in Gothic style. It has an L-shaped plan and is in two storeys with gables. In front of the lodge is a wall with cast iron railings. At the entrance to the cemetery are cast iron gates. These are flanked by octagonal stone piers with pyramidal copings.	II
Lower Paradise Mill; 53.25579°N 2.12468°W		1862	A former silk mill, later converted into a working museum with 26 Jacquard looms. It is built in brick with Welsh slate roofs, is in four storeys, and has a 13-bay front. The right three bays project forward and contain an Art Deco entrance. Along the top of the mill is a stepped parapet.	II
Cemetery Chapel (Episcopal); 53.26629°N 2.13911°W		1866	The cemetery chapel was designed by James Stevens, it is built in sandstone with Westmorland slate roofs, and is in Gothic style. The chapel consists of a nave with two gabled porches, an octagonal narthex, and a tower with a porch. On the tower are gablets and a slim recessed spire with lucarnes. Other features include rose windows in the gables, and Decorated tracery in the windows flanking the porches.	II
Parkside Hospital; 53.26297°N 2.15375°W		1868–71	A former psychiatric hospital designed by Robert Griffiths that closed in 1997 and has been converted into domestic use. It is built in red brick with dressings and decoration in yellow and blue brick and in stone. The roofs are in Welsh slate. It is arranged with a plan around quadrangles, and an administrative building at the entrance. Prominent features include a tall clock tower on the administrative building, and two towers with lead cupolas flanking the dining hall.	II
Parkside Lodge, Parkside Hospital; 53.26350°N 2.15032°W	—	1868–71	The lodge to the hospital was designed by Robert Griffiths, and is in red brick with dressings in blue and yellow brick and in stone, and with a slate roof. It is in Italianate style, has an L-shaped plan, and is in two storeys. The front is in two bays, the right bay projecting forward and gabled. The ground floor windows have wedge lintels and keystones.	II
Fence Almshouses; 53.25942°N 2.11912°W		1870–72	The almshouses were designed by Walter Aston, and were extended in 1895 and again in 1992–93. They are built in brick with stone dressings, a stone-flagged roof, and applied timber-framing in the gables. The almshouses are in a single storey with a central entrance through a stone archway. Above this is a large jettied three-light mullioned and transomed window and a gable surmounted by a weathervane. On each side of the entrance are two windows under gables with finials.	II
88, 90 and 92 Buxton Road; 53.25938°N 2.11864°W	—	1871	Three brick houses with stone dressings, stone-flagged roofs, and some half-timbering applied to gables. They are in two storeys. Nos. 90 and 92 face Buxton Road and each has a doorway and a single-storey bay window. The entrance to No. 88 is on the right side in a timber porch, above which is an oriel window and a gable rising higher than the roof line. To the right of this is a bay with a small gable. All the widows are sashes.	II
Parkstone Hospital Chapel; 53.26088°N 2.15584°W	—	1871	The chapel was designed by Robert Griffiths, and is built in stone from Tegg's Nose with a tiled roof. It has a cruciform plan, consisting of a long nave, transepts, and a chancel with a three-sided apse. At the west end is a bellcote.	II
Stanley's Almshouses; 53.26208°N 2.12935°W	—	1871	The almshouses were extended in 1927 and again in 1992. They are built in stone with slate roofs, and consist of four blocks on three sides of a courtyard. The buildings are in Gothic style. They are in a single storey, with mullioned windows; gabled dormers were added in 1992. The entrance is through a pointed archway with a castellated parapet.	II
Fence House; 53.25953°N 2.11941°W		1872	A brick house with stone dressings, timber framing in the gables, and a stone-flagged roof. It is in Tudor style, and has two storeys and an asymmetrical front. On the right a gabled wing projects forward, and to the left is a set-back wing. On the front is a gabled two-storey bay window. On the right side of the house is an oriel window forming a porch. The windows are mullioned and transomed or mullioned.	II
George Street Mill; 53.25728°N 2.12188°W		1872	The mill was extended in 1855. It is built in brick on a stone plinth with a Welsh slate roof. The original block is in three storeys, with 13 bays facing George Street, and a six-bay wing to the south. The later block is in four storeys, with 11 bays on George Street, and was planned to accommodate Jacquard weaving.	II
Farm buildings, Lark Hall Yard; 53.25856°N 2.10620°W	—	1874	A group of farm buildings forming three sides of a courtyard. They are in stone and brick and have stone-flagged roofs. The central range has gabled dormers with bargeboards and finials, and all ranges have various openings.	II
Public Library; 53.25643°N 2.12472°W		1874–76	Designed as the Chadwick Library by James Stevens, and later altered and used as a Register Office. It is built in stone with Welsh slate roofs, is in Gothic style, and has a complex plan on corner site. Its features include an entrance with polished granite columns and polychromic brickwork, a canted corner topped by a spirelet, a gable containing a rose window, and transomed lancet windows.	II
Waters Green New Mill; 53.25922°N 2.12313°W		1875	A former silk mill, later used as offices, built in brick with a stone-flagged roof. It is in four storeys and has a front of eight bays. The 16-pane windows have heads of red and yellow brick. Inside, the timber beams are carried on cast iron columns.	II
Former Dye Houses, Waterside; 53.25454°N 2.12060°W	—	Late 19th century	The three attached dye houses are built in brick with roofs of asbestos sheet, and have slatted clerestories. They are in a single storey, and have three gables facing the street with decorative brickwork. Each dye house has a wedge-shaped plan.	II
183–189 Crompton Road; 53.25547°N 2.13526°W	—	1877	A terrace of four houses on a stone plinth with a Welsh slate roof. They are in three storeys, the top floor being weavers' garrets. The houses have a double-pile plan, and each house is in a single bay. The doorways have round heads, and the windows are sashes, those in the top storey being horizontally sliding.	II
College of Further Education; 53.25634°N 2.12438°W	—	1877	The college was later extended, incorporating a house dating from the early 19th century, and a further block was added in 1900, with an extension in 1913. It is built mainly in stone with Welsh slate roofs. The main building is in two storeys with a seven-bay front.	II
United Reformed Church; 53.25688°N 2.12415°W		1877	This was originally a Congregational church designed by C. O. Ellison. It is built in stone with a Welsh slate roof, and is in Gothic Revival style. At the entrance front is a recessed porch with paired arches carried on granite shafts, above which is a triple stepped window. To the right of this is a four stage tower with a pierced parapet and pinnacles. Inside the church is a hammerbeam roof and galleries on three sides.	II
Chapel Mill; 53.25591°N 2.12187°W	—	c. 1880	Originally a chapel, this was converted into a textile mill in 1946. It is built in brick with stone dressings and a Welsh slate roof. The building is in three storeys with a front of four bays. The doorways and the windows, which are sashes, have stone architraves. At the top of the building is a modillion cornice and a shallow pediment.	II
Walls, gates and gate piers, Fence Almshouses; 53.25958°N 2.11901°W		c. 1880	The low stone wall extends along the front of the almhouses and house. Opposite the entrance to the almhouses is a pair of rusticated gate piers with ball finials. The gates are in wrought iron.	II
Former District Bank; 53.26146°N 2.12544°W		1881	Built as the Manchester and County Bank, this has been converted into a library. It is built in brick and sandstone with a Welsh slate roof. The building is in two storeys with four bays on Jordangate, three on Brunswick Street, and a canted bay between containing the entrance. The windows are sashes, and other features include coped gables, quoins and a moulded cornice. The gate piers at the rear are included in the listing.	II
Arighi Bianchi Showrooms; 53.26072°N 2.12191°W		1882–83	This originated as a silk mill and has later been used as a furniture showroom. It has a front of four storeys in cast iron and glass, the sides and rear being in brick. The entrance porch is recessed and has a mosaic floor. The front has three bays, the upper storeys each containing an arcade of three round-headed windows.	II*
West Park Museum; 53.26301°N 2.13659°W		1897–98	The museum was given to the town by members of the Brocklehurst family. It is built in brick with terracotta dressings and has a Welsh slate roof. It is in a single storey, and consists of a single room that is lit from above by a clerestory. The entrance front has a shaped gable, and a decorative terracotta frieze and panels. There is a glass verandah on the right side.	II
War Memorial; 53.25597°N 2.12240°W		1921	The war memorial was designed by John Millard. It consists of a stone pedestal and pillar, with statues, wreathes, and inscribed plates in bronze. Around the pillar is a curved wall with more pillars. On top of the main pillar is a female figure holding a wreath, and beside the pillar are the statues of a soldier who has died from gassing, and of Britannia leaning over him with a wreath.	II*
Pair of telephone kiosks 53.26074°N 2.12544°W		1935	A pair of K6 type telephone kiosks standing in front of the town hall, designed by Giles Gilbert Scott. Constructed in cast iron with a square plan and a dome, they have three unperforated crowns in the top panels.	II
41 Sunderland Street; 53.25775°N 2.12266°W	—	Undated	A brick shop with a Welsh slate roof. It is in two storeys with a single bay. In the ground floor, to the left of a modern shop front, is a Gothic doorcase with clustered shafts rising to pinnacles, with an ogee archway between. The window in the upper floor is a sash.	II
Walls, railings and gate piers, St Alban's Hall; 53.25786°N 2.12881°W	—	Undated	The walls and the terminal piers are in stone with ogee caps, and the railings are in cast iron. The gate piers are in hollow cast iron.	II

== See also ==
- Listed buildings in Bollington
- Listed buildings in Gawsworth
- Listed buildings in Henbury
- Listed buildings in Higher Hurdsfield
- Listed buildings in Macclesfield Forest and Wildboarclough
- Listed buildings in Over Alderley
- Listed buildings in Prestbury
- Listed buildings in Rainow
- Listed buildings in Sutton
