= King Edward Street Chapel, Macclesfield =

Coordinates: 53.26116°N 2.12625°W

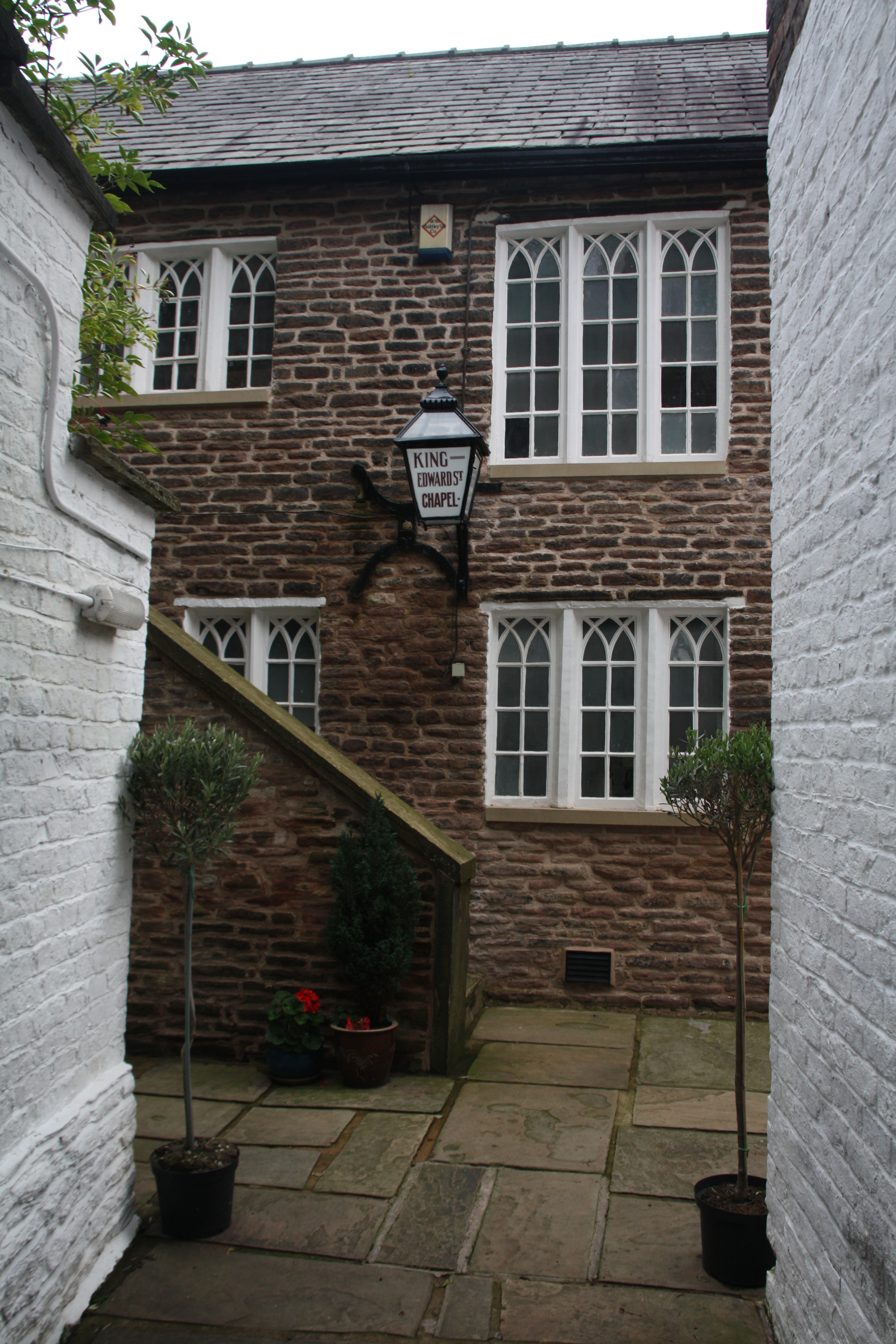
- King Edward Street Chapel, Macclesfield

- Location in Cheshire
- OS grid reference: SJ 917 738
- Location: Macclesfield, Cheshire
- Country: England
- Denomination: Unitarian
- Website: King Edward Street Chapel

History
- Status: Chapel

Architecture
- Functional status: Active
- Heritage designation: Grade II*
- Architectural type: Chapel
- Style: Gothic Revival
- Completed: 1690

Specifications
- Length: 60 feet (18 m)
- Width: 20 feet (6 m)
- Materials: Red sandstone Stone-flagged roof

Administration
- District: Manchester

King Edward Street Chapel, Macclesfield is in the town of Macclesfield, Cheshire, England. It is recorded in the National Heritage List for England as a designated Grade II* listed building.

== History ==
The chapel was built in 1690, soon after the passing of the Act of Toleration 1689. Initially an independent chapel in the Trinitarian tradition it became Unitarian during the ministry of John Palmer between 1764 and 1780. Around 1800 the internal south gallery was removed. In the early 19th century a number of Gothic features were introduced to the interior. In 1825 it acquired its current name, changed from Back Street Chapel.

The old box pews were replaced with bench pews in 1930. It is still in use as a Unitarian chapel.

== Architecture ==
=== Exterior ===
The chapel lies behind other buildings and is approached by a narrow passageway from King Edward Street. It is built from local red sandstone and has a pair of external staircases leading to the east and west galleries. A lead downspout bears the date 1690. The chapel is 60 feet (18 m) long and 20 feet (6 m) wide.

=== Interior ===
A high two-decker pulpit is in the middle of the north side. Galleries are at the east and west ends. In the vestry are oil portraits of Thomas Culcheth, minister from 1717 to 1751, and his wife. There is an elaborately carved chair by William Leicester made in 1688. The communion table which was presented to the chapel in 1894 is also elaborately carved. The alabaster christening bowl and its cover are dated 1842. In the east gallery is a two-manual organ dated 1846, made by John Bellamy. There are no memorials or gravestones. The registers date from 1713 and the treasurers' cash books from 1708.

== See also ==
- Grade II* listed buildings in Cheshire East
- Listed buildings in Macclesfield
