= St George's Church, Macclesfield =

Coordinates: 53.2538°N 2.1238°W

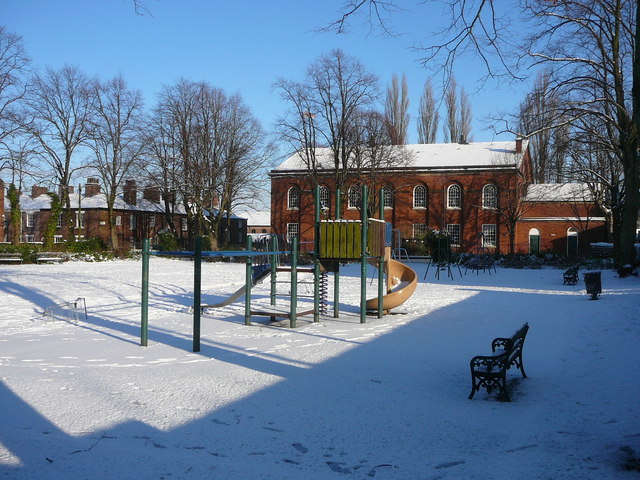
- St George's Square showing the church

- Location in Cheshire
- OS grid reference: SJ 918 730
- Location: St. Georges's Street, Macclesfield, Cheshire
- Country: England
- Denomination: Anglican

History
- Status: Former parish church
- Dedication: Saint George

Architecture
- Functional status: Redundant
- Heritage designation: Grade II
- Designated: 17 March 1977
- Architectural type: Church
- Style: Neoclassical
- Groundbreaking: 1822
- Completed: 1834

Specifications
- Materials: Brick with stone dressings Slate roofs

St George's Church is a former church in High Street, Macclesfield, Cheshire, England. It is recorded in the National Heritage List for England as a designated Grade II listed building.

== History ==
St George's was built originally as an independent church in 1822–23. In 1834 a chancel was added; by this time it had come under the care of the Church of England. During the 20th century it was declared redundant, and has since been converted into offices. When in use as a church, it could seat 1,000 people & frequently did at Sunday evening concerts featuring local choirs..Guest artists sometimes appeared including. Kathleen Ferrier in 1947 just before she became world famous.

== Architecture ==
The former church is constructed in brick with stone dressings and is roofed in Welsh slate. It has a rectangular plan of seven by three bays, and is externally expressed as two storeys. Its architectural style is Neoclassical. At the entrance front is a projecting stone portico consisting of a plain entablature carried on four Tuscan columns, above which is a Venetian window in a stone architrave. The portico leads to a pair of doors, each with a radial fanlight, and between them is a 16-pane sash window. At the summit of the entrance front is a gable. The bays at the front and sides of the church are separated by brick pilasters that curve at their tops to form arched recesses. In each recess is a round-headed window in the upper tier, and a flat-headed window in the lower tier, all of them being sash windows with 30 panes. At the rear is a second Venetian window with a plaque flanked by lunettes above it. Despite the interior having been converted into offices, the gallery has been retained. It is U-shaped, and carried on fluted iron piers.

== See also ==
- Listed buildings in Macclesfield
