= The Castle, Macclesfield =

Listed pub in Cheshire, England

The Castle
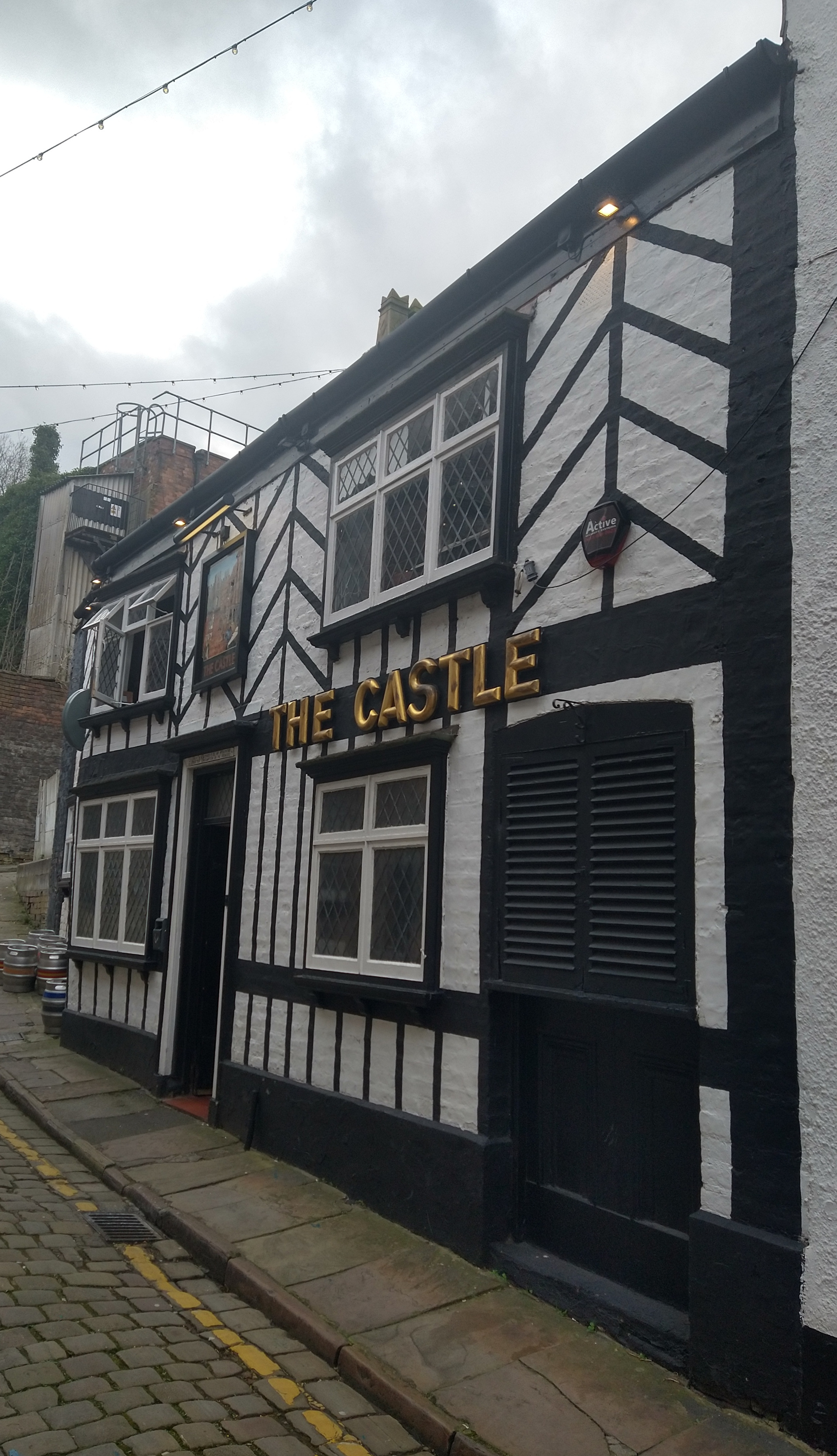
- The pub in 2022

- Location within Cheshire

General information
- Type: Public house; originally houses (probable)
- Location: 25–27 Church Street, Macclesfield, Cheshire, England
- Coordinates: 53.25946°N 2.12531°W
- Year built: 18th century
- Renovated: 19th century (converted); Late 19th century (extended); 2021 (refurbished)

Design and construction
- Designations

Listed Building – Grade II
- Official name: The Castle public house
- Designated: 28 October 1994
- Reference no.: 1291859

The Castle is a Grade II listed public house on Church Street in Macclesfield, Cheshire, England. The building probably originated as late 18th-century dwellings before being converted into a pub during the 19th century. It is included on CAMRA's National Inventory of Historic Pub Interiors, where its three-star interior is regarded as being of "outstanding national historic importance". It reopened in 2021 after refurbishment following a six-year closure and later received a joint CAMRA and Historic England Conservation Award.

== History ==
The building consists of a public house created from what were probably late 18th-century dwellings that were remodelled for pub use during the 19th century. A substantial extension was added to the rear later in the 19th century. The premises were formerly owned by the Macclesfield brewery Lonsdale & Adshead.

On 28 October 1994, The Castle was designated a Grade II listed building. It was included on the Campaign for Real Ale (CAMRA)'s National Inventory of Historic Pub Interiors before the inventory's grading system was revised. Under the revised scheme, it is rated three stars and its interior is regarded as being "of outstanding national historic importance".

After closing in 2015, the pub reopened in September 2021 following an extensive refurbishment, which subsequently received a joint CAMRA and Historic England Conservation Award.

== Architecture ==
=== Exterior ===
The two-storey building is constructed of brick, with the front elevation painted, and has slate-covered roofs. Chimneys rise from each end of the building.

=== Interior ===
The interior retains much of its historic arrangement. A small entrance lobby leads to the principal rooms, including a small bar with a 19th-century bar counter, built-in seating and wall panelling. Opposite, the smoke room retains fixed seating, bell-push fittings, a painted fireplace surround and a decorative ceiling with geometric and foliate ornament.

A central corridor runs through the building and retains a former serving hatch. Along one side is a curved glazed screen that formerly enclosed the off-sales area, while nearby fittings include the entrance to the servery and a bell indicator board associated with the pub's former call system. The smoke room's decorative ceiling was restored before the pub reopened in 2021 following a prolonged closure.

Behind the servery is a parlour separated from the corridor by a glazed screen. Original bench seating survives, although alterations during the late 20th century included the creation of an opening to the servery and the removal of some seating. The corridor retains Lincrusta wall covering.

At the rear, a room brought into pub use in 1986 was enlarged in 2021 through the incorporation of the former kitchen. The gentlemen's toilets, originally outside the building, were later relocated indoors.

== See also ==
- Listed buildings in Macclesfield
