= St Alban's Church, Macclesfield =

Coordinates: 53.2600°N 2.1340°W

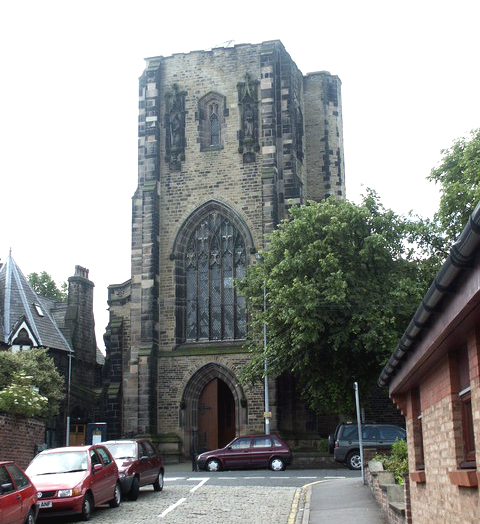
- West front of St Alban's Church, Macclesfield

- Location in Cheshire
- OS grid reference: SJ 912 736
- Location: Chester Road, Macclesfield, Cheshire
- Country: England
- Denomination: Roman Catholic
- Website: St Alban, Macclesfield

History
- Status: Parish church
- Dedication: Saint Alban

Architecture
- Functional status: Active
- Heritage designation: Grade II*
- Designated: 17 March 1977
- Architect: A. G. Pugin
- Architectural type: Church
- Style: Gothic Revival
- Completed: 1841
- Construction cost: c. £8,000

Specifications
- Materials: Stone, Welsh slate roof

Administration
- Diocese: Shrewsbury

Clergy
- Priest: Father Peter Burke

St Alban's Church in Macclesfield, Cheshire, England, is a Roman Catholic parish church. The church is recorded in the National Heritage List for England as a designated Grade II* listed building. It was designed by A. W. N. Pugin and is described as a "church of exceptional interest among the works of this major architect".

== History ==
The church was designed in 1838 and built between 1839 and 1841. Some of the money needed to build it was given by the Earl of Shrewsbury; the total cost was about £8,000 (equivalent to £720,000 in 2025).

== Architecture ==
=== Exterior ===
The church is built in stone rubble with ashlar dressings and Welsh slate roof. Its plan consists of a west tower, a nave with a high clerestory, north and south aisles, a chancel, a south chapel, a south porch, and a vestry in the northeast angle. Its style is Perpendicular. The tower is unfinished. Its west doorway is deeply moulded with a five-light window above it. Above this is an arched light flanked by statues in niches. The tower has clasping buttresses and a stair turret in the southeast angle. The aisles have five-light windows and in the clerestory are ten closely set two-light windows. The east window has seven lights.

=== Interior ===
In the church the piers carrying the arcade are very slender. At the entrance to the tower, the chancel and the chapel are tall, painted perpendicular arches. In the tower are the organ and the choir gallery. The chancel arch contains a rood screen. On the screen are three 15th-century German figures that were coloured by Pugin. The chancel has a coloured tile floor, a sedilia in the south wall, and an ornate altar piece with a statue in an aedicule over the tabernacle and 12 figures of saints on each side of it. The altarpiece of the chapel consists of a statue in a niche flanked by panels depicting scenes from the life of Mary. Another altar is at the east end of the north aisle. The pulpit was added in 1854. The pulpit, and the altarpiece in the chapel, were designed by E. W. Pugin and carved by Richard Hassall. The stained glass in the east window is either by William Warrington or William Wailes to A. G. Pugin's design. The south window in the chapel is dated 1846, is by Hardman, and also designed by Pugin. The organ was built by Gray & Davison and moved to St Alban's from St Michael's Church, Macclesfield, in 1885. It was rebuilt by the same firm in the 1910s.

== See also ==
- Grade II* listed buildings in Cheshire East
- Listed buildings in Macclesfield
