= Macclesfield Cenotaph =

World War I memorial in Macclesfield, England

Coordinates: 53.25597°N 2.12240°W

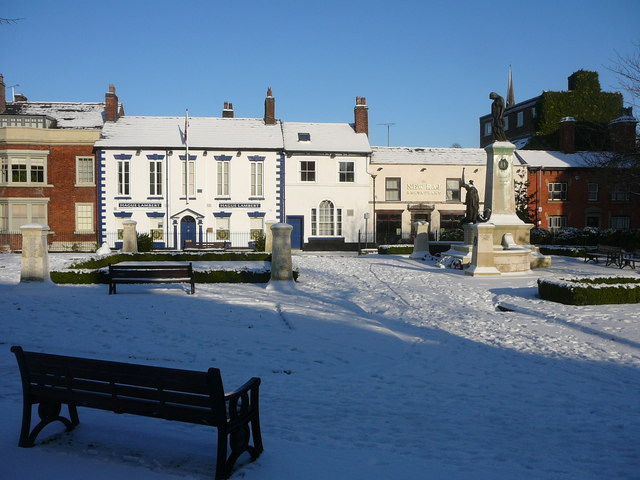
Park Green showing the War Memorial on the right

Macclesfield Cenotaph is a World War I memorial in Park Green, Macclesfield, Cheshire, England. It was unveiled in 1921, and consists of a stone pillar and pedestal and three bronze statues. One statue is that of a mourning female, and the others comprise Britannia laying a wreath over a soldier who had died from gassing, an unusual subject for a war memorial at the time. The memorial is recorded in the National Heritage List for England as a designated Grade II* listed building.

== History ==
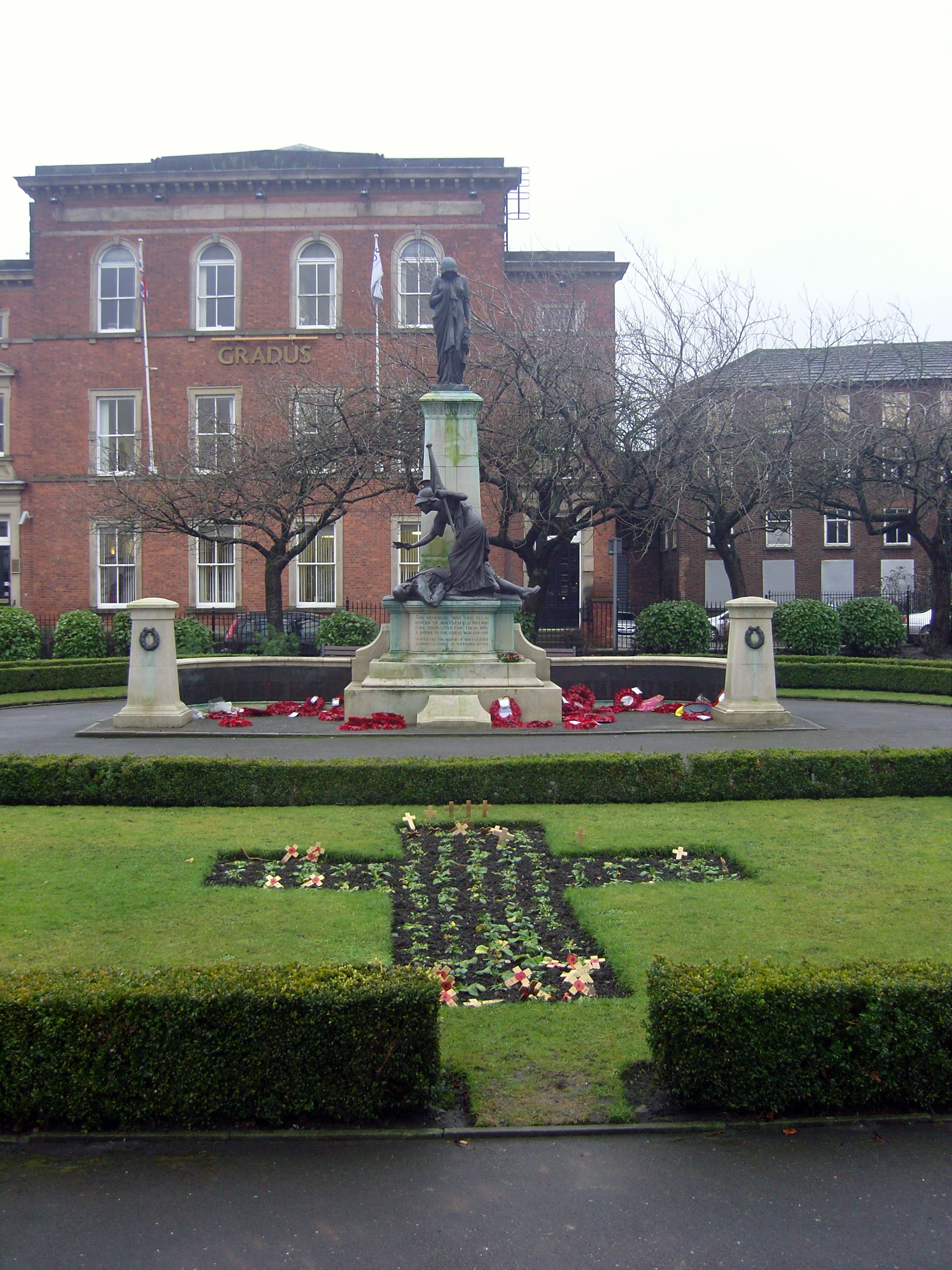
The War Memorial

In 1919 a public meeting was held in the town and a War Memorial Committee was formed. The committee invited public subscriptions to be given toward the design and erection of a memorial to commemorate those who had been lost in the First World War. Although money was slow to come in, the committee invited John Millard of the Manchester School of Art to produce a model for a memorial. The model included a statue of Britannia laying a crown of laurels on the body of a soldier who had died from gassing. There was discussion about the "gruesome" nature of this statue, and some argued for a more heroic subject, but Millard's model was eventually accepted. It was built locally by E. and H. Frith, and was unveiled by the Mayor of Macclesfield on 21 September 1921. The ceremony was attended by about 20,000 people.

== Description ==
The memorial consists of a stone pedestal and pillar, with statues, wreathes, and inscribed plates in bronze. It stands about 7.3 metres (24 ft) high. Behind the memorial is a curved wall ending in pillars and there are four more pillars arranged in front of the memorial; all these carry inscribed plates. On top of the main pillar is the bronze statue of a female figure, mourning and holding a wreath, representing those who were left behind at home. At the foot of the column are two more bronze statues. One is of a soldier who has died from gassing, clutching a gas mask which he had not had time to place over his face. The other is of Britannia, leaning over the soldier, placing a laurel wreath over his head.

On the front of the base of the memorial is an inscription:

THIS MEMORIAL WAS ERECTED IN
HONOUR OF MACCLESFIELD MEN WHO
GAVE THEIR LIVES FOR THEIR KING
& EMPIRE IN THE GREAT WAR 1914–1918
UNVEILED BY THE MAYOR OF MACCLESFIELD
ALDERMAN J. G. FROST J.P. SEPTEMBER 21ST 1921

The left side of the pillar is inscribed:

ITALY
MACEDONIA
DARDANELLES

The right side is:

FRANCE
BELGIUM
EGYPT

And the back is inscribed:

PALESTINE
MESOPOTAMIA
RUSSIA

The names of those who lost their lives in World War One are inscribed on the four pillars in front of the memorial. The names of a further fifty men and three women who lost their lives in World War One but were omitted from the original four pillars are inscribed on the sides of the left-hand pillar of the memorial; this was rededicated on 2 July 2023.

The names of those who lost their lives in World War Two are inscribed on a series of bronze plates on the curved walls between the three main pillars.

Five names of those who lost their lives in other conflicts are inscribed on the side on the right-hand pillar of the memorial.

== Appraisal ==
Following the First World War most memorials were designed to evoke heroic triumphalism or detached contemplation, and they avoided depicting the horrors of war. It was unusual to include depictions of dead soldiers, as this was thought to be too gruesome, an objection that was raised about the dead soldier in the Royal Artillery Memorial by Charles Sargeant Jagger at Hyde Park Corner in London. To depict soldiers dying heroically was more acceptable, and servicemen dying in the arms of angels were included in memorials by Ferdinand Blundstone in war memorials in Stalybridge and at the Prudential Assurance Building in London. As the Macclesfield Memorial is an exception to the general rule of design for war memorials at the time, Morris and Roberts in the Public Sculpture in Britain series consider it to be "of great interest". The monument is recorded in the National Heritage List for England as a Grade II* listed building. It was initially designated on 1 March 1977 at Grade II, and this was raised to Grade II* on 11 November 2016. Grade II* is the middle of the three grades of listing and is applied to "particularly important buildings of more than special interest". Writing about the architecture of Macclesfield, Hartwell et al. in the Buildings of England series describe the memorial as being "The finest thing in town".

== See also ==
- Listed buildings in Macclesfield
- Grade II* listed war memorials in England
