= St Paul's Church, Macclesfield =

Coordinates: 53.2573°N 2.1196°W

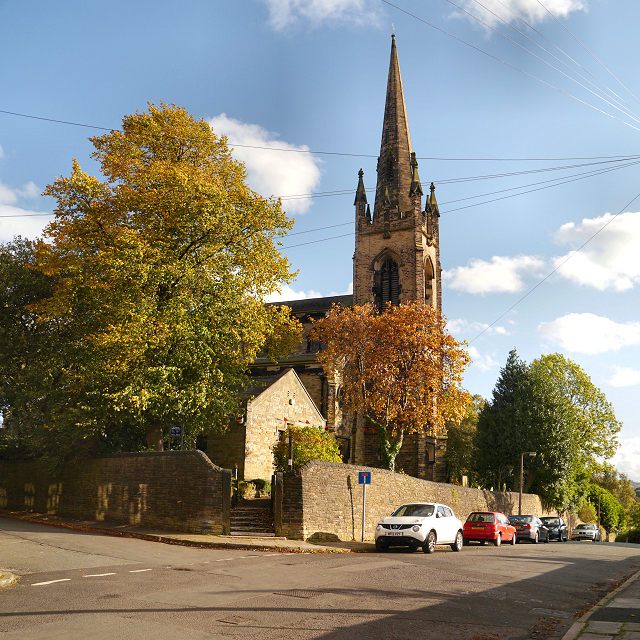

- Location in Cheshire
- OS grid reference: SJ 921 734
- Location: Brook Street, Macclesfield, Cheshire
- Country: England
- Denomination: Anglican
- Churchmanship: Central
- Website: St Paul's Macclesfield

History
- Status: Parish church
- Dedication: Saint Paul

Architecture
- Functional status: Active
- Heritage designation: Grade II
- Designated: 17 March 1977
- Architect: William Hayley
- Architectural type: Church
- Style: Gothic Revival
- Groundbreaking: 1843
- Completed: 1844
- Construction cost: £5,000

Specifications
- Materials: Stone, slate roofs

Administration
- Province: York
- Diocese: Chester
- Archdeaconry: Macclesfield
- Deanery: Macclesfield
- Parish: St.Paul, Macclesfield

Clergy
- Vicar: Revd Canon Vivien Gisby

St Paul's Church is in Brook Street, Macclesfield, Cheshire, England. It is an active Anglican parish church in the deanery of Macclesfield, the archdeaconry of Macclesfield, and the diocese of Chester. The church is recorded in the National Heritage List for England as a designated Grade II listed building. It was a Commissioners' church, having received a grant towards its construction from the Church Building Commission.

== History ==
St Paul's was built in 1843–44 to a design by William Hayley. A grant of £1,000 (equivalent to £110,000 in 2025) was given towards its construction by the Church Building Commission. The total cost of construction was £5,000.

== Architecture ==
=== Exterior ===
The church is constructed in rubble stone with slate roofs. Its architectural style is Perpendicular. The plan consists of a nave with a clerestory, north and south six-bay aisles, a short chancel, and a west tower with a recessed spire. The tower is in three stages with a wide west doorway over which is a three-light window. In the middle stage are blind traceried arcades and a central roundel. In the top stage are paired bell openings. At the summit of the tower is a stepped parapet with pinnacles at the centres and corner. The spire contains lucarnes. At the west end of the aisles are doorways with rose windows above them. Along the sides of the aisles are buttresses between the bays. Each bay contains a two-light window, and there are similar windows along the clerestory. The sides of the chancel contain lancet windows, and the east window has four lights.

=== Interior ===
Inside the church are five-bay arcades carried on octagonal piers, and a west gallery. Between the nave and the chancel is a screen with an integral pulpit. In the chancel is a reredos containing mosaic, and sediliae on both the north and south sides. In the eastern bay of the chancel the roof is painted with stencil work. The stained glass in the east window dates from 1921, it is by Walter J. Pearce, and it depicts Suffer the Children. The three-manual organ was built in 1911 by Alex Young and Sons.

== See also ==
- List of Commissioners' churches in Northeast and Northwest England
- Listed buildings in Macclesfield
