= Memorial to John Whitaker =

Memorial in Macclesfield, Cheshire, England

Coordinates: 53.25792°N 2.12767°W

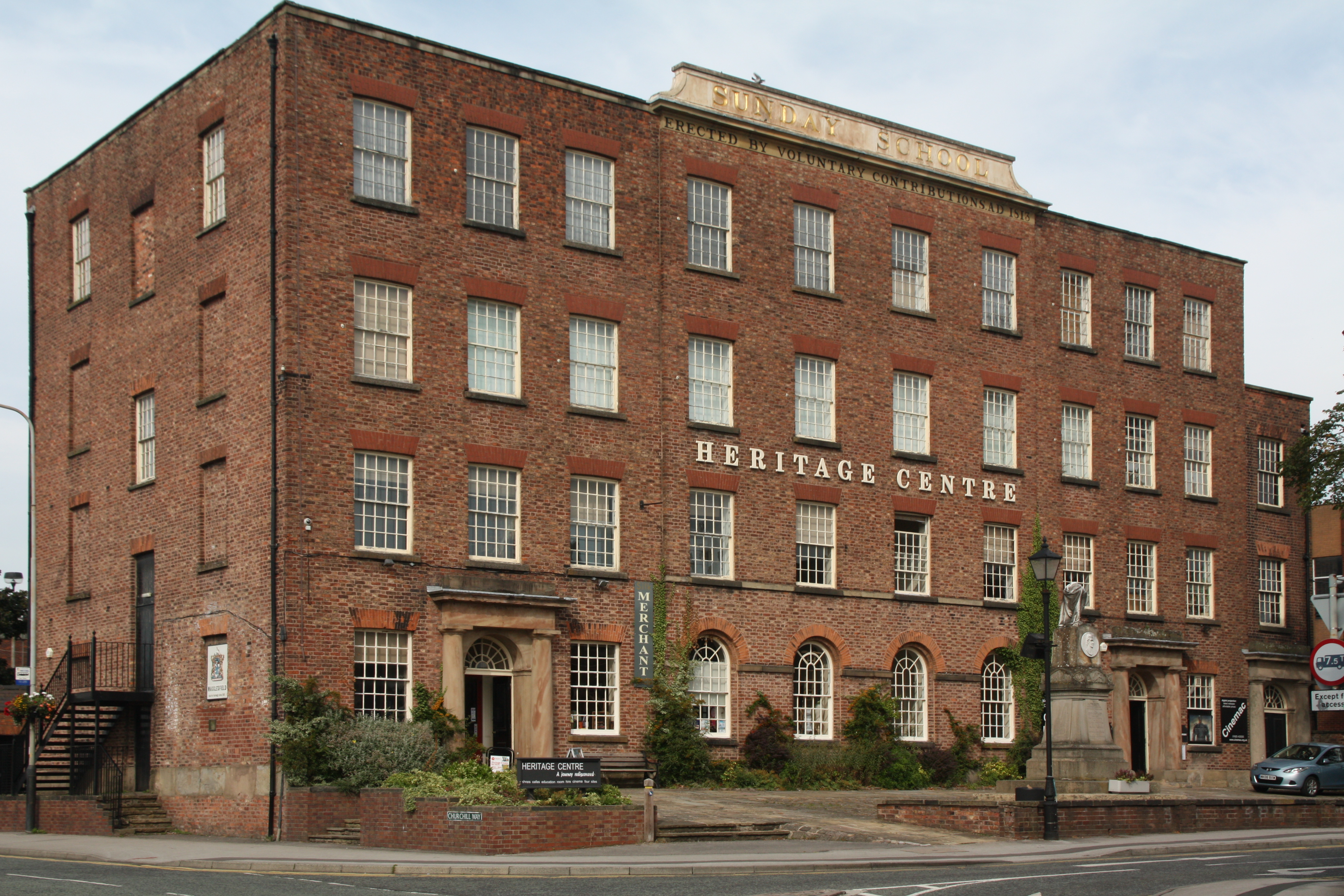
Macclesfield Heritage Centre, originally the Sunday School, with Whitaker's memorial in the forecourt

The Memorial to John Whitaker is in Roe Street, Macclesfield, Cheshire, England. It stands in the forecourt of the Sunday School that Whitaker established in 1814, and was placed there in 1846 to commemorate the school's fiftieth anniversary. The memorial was sculpted by Alfred Gatley in stone and marble, and contains a bust of Whitaker in a medallion on the south face. The monument is recorded in the National Heritage List for England as a designated Grade II listed building.

== History ==
John Whitaker (1772–1820) was an alderman of Macclesfield Borough Council and a local magistrate. In 1796 he opened a free Sunday School in Pickford Street, which accommodated about 40 children. In doing this he was inspired by Robert Raikes who had initiated the Sunday School movement, and by David Simpson, a local Anglican priest who had earlier provided schools for poor children in the town. Unlike most Sunday Schools, Whitaker's school was non-denominational. In 1814 he followed this by opening a much larger purpose-built Sunday School in Roe Street. The school was financed by public subscription and by the children paying a small weekly fee. Whitaker died in 1820, but the school continued to flourish, and in 1844 a Day School was opened in the same building. These schools continued to function until they were closed in 1973.

The fiftieth anniversary of the foundation of the school was celebrated on 6 May 1846 by processions, speeches, feasting and unveiling a memorial to Whitaker in the forecourt of the school; the sculptor was Alfred Gatley. Since the closure of the school, the building has been converted to become Macclesfield Heritage Centre. There was a previous memorial to Whitaker, which was created by Samuel Franceys and Son of Liverpool and was placed in the Sunday School in 1821. It consists of a bust of Whitaker surrounded by grieving scholars. This memorial is now in the auditorium of the Heritage Centre.

== Description ==
The memorial is constructed in stone and marble, and stands about 9 metres (30 ft) high. It consists of a tapering pedestal standing on steps, above which is a cornice decorated with acroteria. On top of this is a plain block surmounted by a draped urn. On the south face of the block is a medallion containing a bust of Whitaker in low relief. On the south face of the pediment is an inscription reading as follows.

AS
A TRIBUTE
OF VENERATION AND ESTEEM,
FOR THE PRIVATE AND PUBLIC BENEVOLENCE
OF
JOHN WHITAKER,
THE FOUNDER,
THIS MONUMENT IS ERECTED
BY THE
VOLUNTARY CONTRIBUTIONS
OF A
GRATEFUL POSTERITY,
THE
SIXTH DAY OF MAY, 1846,
BEING
THE FIFTIETH ANNIVERSARY OF
THE ESTABLISHMENT
OF THIS SUNDAY SCHOOL

== Appraisal ==
The monument was designated as a Grade II listed building on 28 October 1994. Grade II is the lowest of the three grades of listing and is applied to "buildings of national importance and special interest". In the Public Sculpture of Britain series, Morris and Roberts comment that it "has the design of a typical classicist church monument enlarged for an outside location". The Sunday School (now the Heritage Centre) established by Whitaker is designated as a Grade II* listed building. Grade II* is the middle of the three grades and is granted to "particularly important buildings of more than special interest".
