= St Peter's Church, Macclesfield =

Coordinates: 53.2534°N 2.1179°W

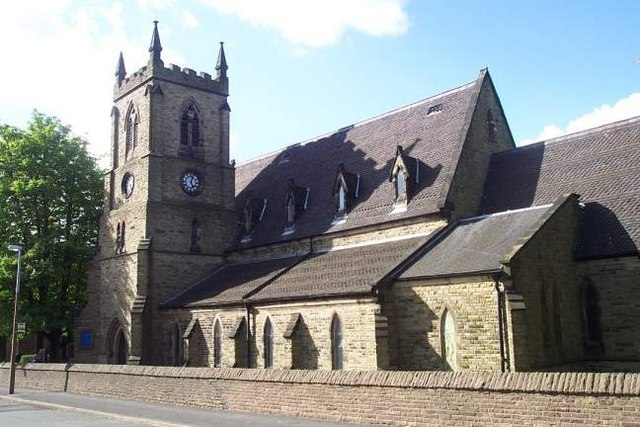
- St Peter's Church, Macclesfield, from the southeast

- Location in Cheshire
- OS grid reference: SJ 922 729
- Location: Windmill Street, Macclesfield, Cheshire
- Country: England
- Denomination: Anglican
- Website: St Peter, Macclesfield

History
- Status: Parish church
- Dedication: Saint Peter

Architecture
- Functional status: Active
- Heritage designation: Grade II
- Designated: 28 October 1984
- Architect(s): Charles and James Trubshaw
- Architectural type: Church
- Style: Gothic Revival
- Completed: 1849

Specifications
- Materials: Stone, tile roofs

Administration
- Province: York
- Diocese: Chester
- Archdeaconry: Macclesfield
- Deanery: Macclesfield
- Parish: Macclesfield Team Parish

Clergy
- Rector: Revd Martin Stephens

St Peter's Church is in Windmill Street, Macclesfield, Cheshire, England. It is an active Anglican parish church in the diocese of Chester, the archdeaconry of Macclesfield, and the deanery of Macclesfield. It forms a team ministry with three other Macclesfield churches: St Michael, All Saints, and St Barnabas. The church is recorded in the National Heritage List for England as a designated Grade II listed building. It was a Commissioners' church, having received a grant towards its construction from the Church Building Commission.

== History ==
St Peter's was built in 1849, and designed by Charles and James Trubshaw. It was planned to have a spire, but this was never built. A grant of £257 (equivalent to £30,000 in 2025) was given towards its construction by the Church Building Commission. The interior was re-ordered in 2005.

== Architecture ==
=== Exterior ===
The church is constructed in rubble stone with tiled roofs. Its architectural style is Early English. The plan consists of a five-bay nave with a clerestory, north and south aisles, a chancel, a northeast vestry, and a southwest tower. The tower is in four stages with corner buttresses, and an embattled parapet with corner pinnacles. There are doors on the west and southwest sides, lancet windows in the second stage, circular clock faces in the third stage, and paired louvred bell openings in the top stage. Along the sides of the church the bays are divided by buttresses, each bay containing a lancet window. The clerestory contains gabled dormers. The east window in the chancel is a stepped triple lancet.

=== Interior ===
Inside the church is a west gallery. The nave is divided from the aisles by five-bay arcades carried on circular piers whose capitals are decorated with stiff-leaf carving. The bowl of the font has blind trefoil arcading, and is carried on clustered shafts. The wooden lectern is elaborately carved. The organ was built in 1891 by Young. There is a ring of eight bells, all of which were cast in 1947 by John Taylor & Co of Loughborough.

== See also ==
- List of Commissioners' churches in Northeast and Northwest England
- Listed buildings in Macclesfield
