= Macclesfield United Reformed Church =

Coordinates: 53.2569°N 2.1241°W

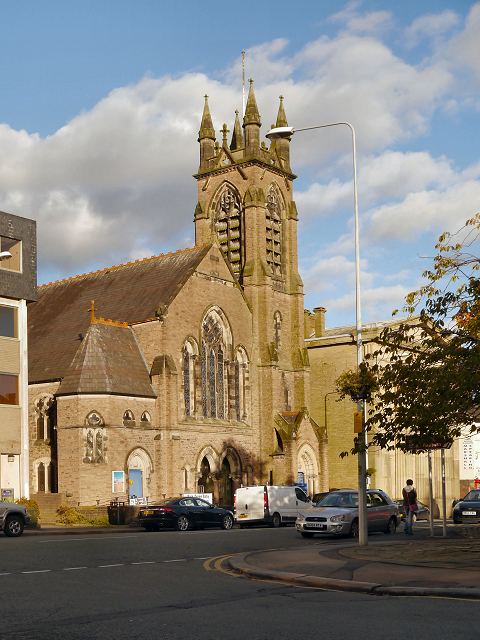
- Macclesfield United Reformed Church

- Location in Cheshire
- OS grid reference: SJ 918 733
- Location: Park Green, Macclesfield, Cheshire
- Country: England
- Denomination: United Reformed Church
- Website: Macclesfield United Reformed Church

Architecture
- Functional status: Active
- Heritage designation: Grade II
- Designated: 17 March 1977
- Architect: C. O. Ellison
- Architectural type: Church
- Style: Gothic Revival
- Completed: 1877

Specifications
- Materials: Stone, slate roofs

Macclesfield United Reformed Church is located in Park Green, Macclesfield, Cheshire, England. It is recorded in the National Heritage List for England as a designated Grade II listed building.

== History ==
Built in 1877, it was originally a Congregational church, the architect being C. O. Ellison. The church replaced an older chapel built in 1788 located nearby.

== Architecture ==
The church is contracted in freestone with Welsh slate roofs in Gothic Revival style. Its plan consists of the main body of the church, a south porch, and a southwest tower, with church offices attached on the north side. The tower is in four stages with corner buttresses. On the west side is a gabled porch flanked by pilasters. There are lancet windows in the second and third stages, with paired bell openings in the top stage. At the summit are corner pinnacles with conical roofs, and a parapet pierced by a gabled decoration arising from the tops of the bell openings. In the entrance front is a recessed porch with an entrance consisting of two pointed arches with polished granite columns. Above this is a stepped triple window, the central window having three lights. To the left is a doorway leading to the church offices. The sides of the church are expressed in two storeys, and divided into three bays by shallow buttresses. Each bay contains a window in both storeys, all with trefoiled heads. Inside the church are a hammerbeam roof and galleries on three sides.

== See also ==
- Listed buildings in Macclesfield
