= Hurdsfield House =

Country house in Cheshire, England

Coordinates: 53.26574°N 2.11546°W

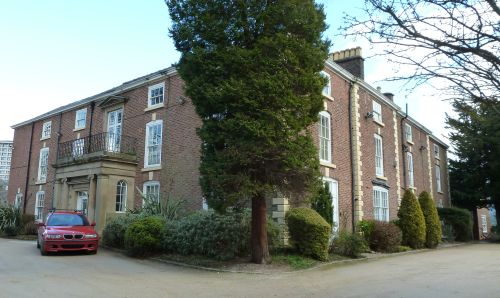
Hurdsfield House (now Brocklehurst Manor) © Rosie Rowley

Hurdsfield House is a former country house, now surrounded by housing, in the town of Macclesfield, Cheshire, England. It was built for a branch of the Brocklehurst family. During the 20th century it was used as a welfare clinic. The house dates from about 1800, with later additions and alterations. It is constructed in brick with stone dressings, and has Welsh slate roofs. The house is in three storeys, and its entrance front, facing west, has five bays. In the central bay is a porch with a Doric architrave, over which is a balcony with wrought iron railings. Behind and above this is a tall window with an entablature. The windows are sashes, and at the corners of the house are quoins. The south front originally had three bays, and a further bay has been added to the right. In the angle at the rear of the house is an extension added later in the 19th century. The house is recorded in the National Heritage List for England as a designated Grade II listed building. It has been divided into flats.

== See also ==
- Listed buildings in Macclesfield
