= Holy Trinity Church, Hurdsfield =

Coordinates: 53.2643°N 2.1129°W

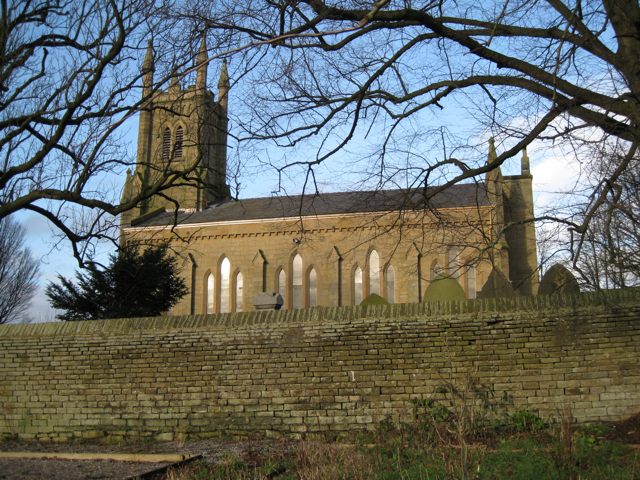
- Holy Trinity Church, Hurdsfield, from the south

- Location in Cheshire
- OS grid reference: SJ 926 742
- Location: Hurdsfield Road, Macclesfield, Cheshire
- Country: England
- Denomination: Anglican
- Churchmanship: Evangelical
- Website: Holy Trinity Hurdsfield

History
- Status: Parish church
- Consecrated: 11 October 1839

Architecture
- Functional status: Active
- Heritage designation: Grade II
- Designated: 28 October 1994
- Architect: William Hayley
- Architectural type: Church
- Style: Gothic Revival
- Groundbreaking: 1838
- Completed: 1839

Specifications
- Materials: Stone, slate roof

Administration
- Province: York
- Diocese: Chester
- Archdeaconry: Macclesfield
- Deanery: Macclesfield
- Parish: Holy Trinity Hurdsfield

Holy Trinity Church is in Hurdsfield Road, Macclesfield, Cheshire, England. It is an active Anglican parish church in the deanery of Macclesfield, the archdeaconry of Macclesfield, and the diocese of Chester. The church is recorded in the National Heritage List for England as a designated Grade II listed building.

== History ==
The foundation stone of Holy Trinity was laid on 28 May 1838, and the church was consecrated on 11 October 1839. It was designed by William Hayley. The church was originally a chapel of ease to St Peter, Prestbury. In 1868 its interior was re-ordered, and in 1876 the clock was installed in the tower. Holy Trinity became a separate parish in its own right in 1879. Further alterations were made to the interior of the church in 1939, 1976, and 1992.

== Architecture ==
=== Exterior ===
The church is constructed in stone with a slate roof. Its architectural style is Gothic Revival. The plan consists of a four-bay nave, a shallow chancel, and an integral west tower. The tower is in four stages with corner buttresses rising to form pinnacles. In the bottom stage is a west door, over which is a two-light window. The third stage contains a clock face in a lozenge panel, and in the top stage are paired bell openings. The tower is topped by an embattled parapet. There are buttresses along the sides of the nave, each bay containing stepped lancet windows. The east window has five lights with Decorated tracery.

=== Interior ===
The interior consists of a single chamber. At the west end is a gallery containing the organ. Under this is a screen to form separate rooms. The two-manual organ was made by Samuel Renn, and rebuilt in 1921 by Alexander Young and Sons. In 1976, following the closure of Trinity Square School adjoining the church, the organ was removed and replaced with a modern electronic version at the front of the nave. The gallery was closed off and the space was modified to provide meeting rooms and a kitchen to replace the facilities formerly in the school.

== External features ==
The churchyard, which is divided into old and new sections, contains the war graves of two soldiers of World War I, and a soldier of World War II.

== See also ==
- Listed buildings in Macclesfield
