= Parkside Hospital =

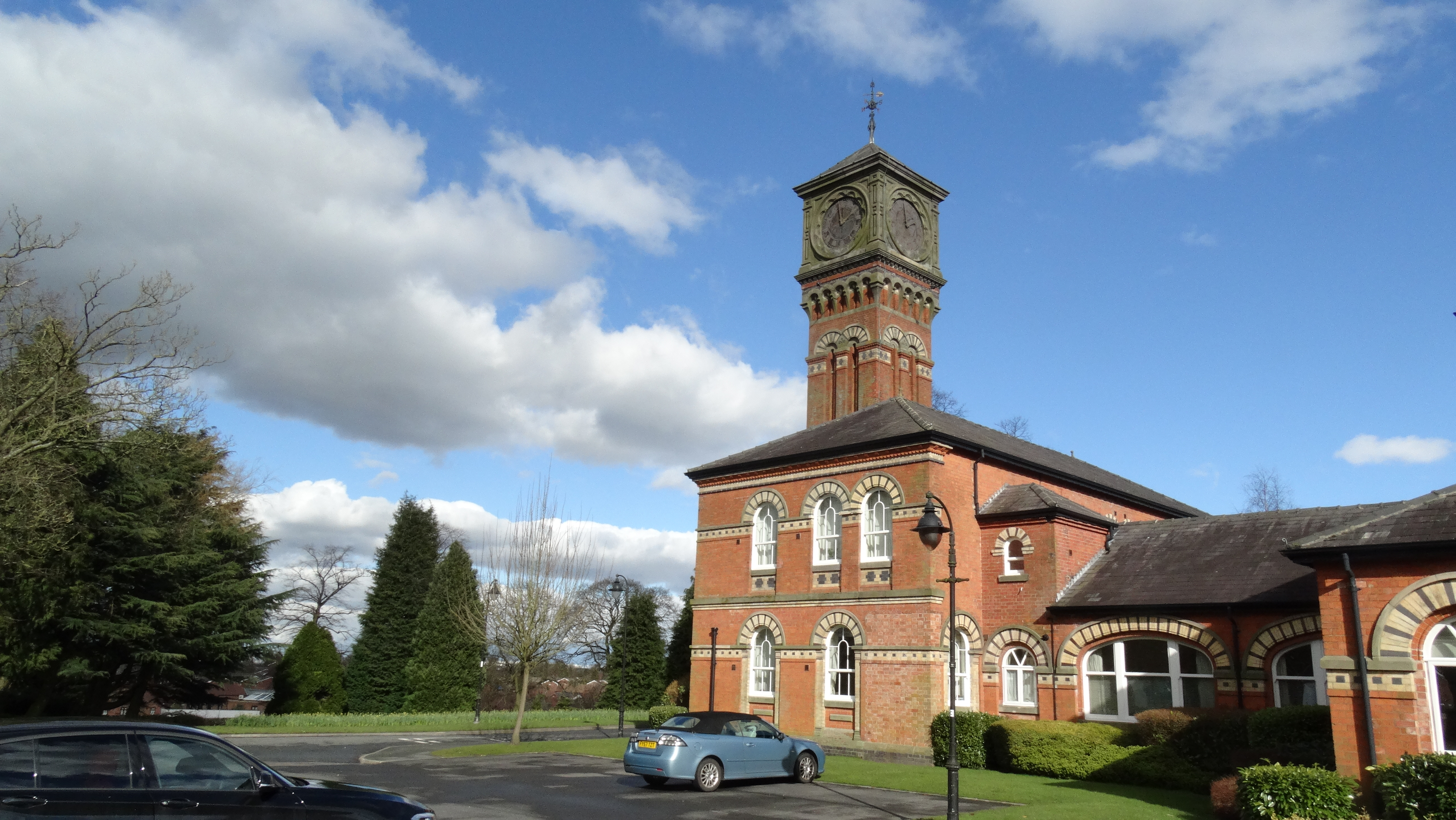
- Clock tower at former Parkside Hospital

- Shown in Cheshire

Geography
- Location: Macclesfield, England
- Coordinates: 53.2628°N 2.1560°W

Organisation
- Care system: NHS
- Type: Specialist

Services
- Speciality: Mental health

History
- Founded: 1871
- Closed: 1997

Links
- Lists: Hospitals in England

Parkside Hospital was a mental health facility at Victoria Road in Macclesfield, Cheshire, England. The administration block survives and is a Grade II listed building.

== History ==
The hospital, which was designed by Robert Griffiths in the Italianate style using a corridor-pavilion layout, opened as the Second Cheshire County Asylum in May 1871. A female epileptic block was completed in 1891 and a male epileptic block was completed in 1903. It became Cheshire County Mental Hospital in 1920 and joined the National Health Service as Parkside Hospital in 1948.

After the introduction of Care in the Community in the early 1980s, the hospital went into a period of decline and closed in January 1997. The main administration block was subsequently converted into apartments.

== See also ==
- Macclesfield District General Hospital
