= Samuel Franceys =

English sculptor (1762–1829)

Samuel Franceys of Liverpool (1762–1829) was a late 18th- and early 19th-century English sculptor and stucco-worker.

== Life ==
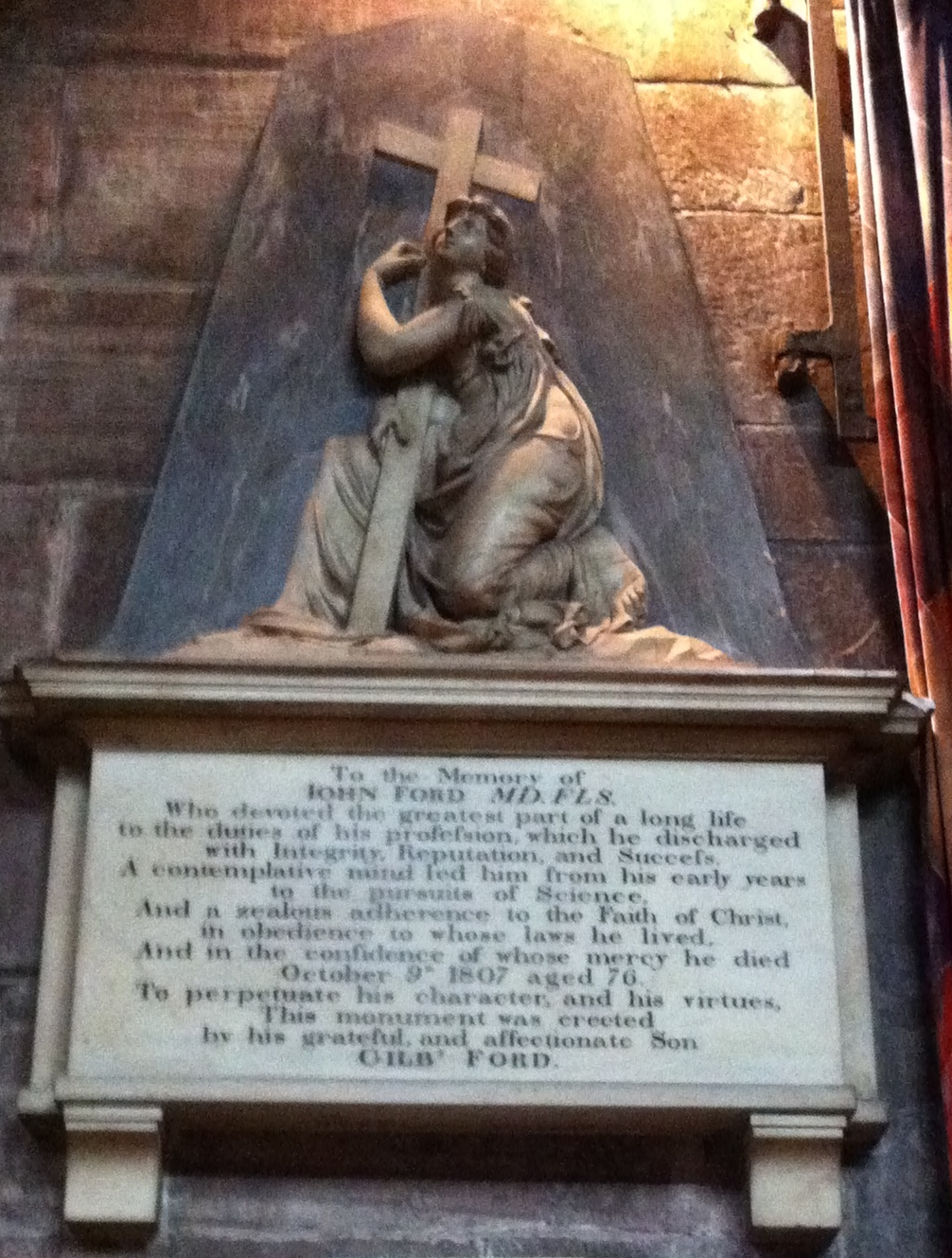
Memorial to John Ford in Chester Cathedral

He was from a family of stucco-workers. His father Samuel Franceys had done the stucco work in Melbourne Hall in Derbyshire.

In 1802, with his younger brother Edward Franceys, he established the "Marble Rooms" in Liverpool. This appeared to be a studio where they trained other sculptors, including John Gibson and William Spence. It was also a showroom for sale of marble monuments and chimneypieces.

In 1819, he went into partnership with William Spence.

He died in Liverpool on 20 May 1829, leaving no known family, and was buried in the Wesleyan Chapel on Brunswick Street.

== Known works ==
- Monument to William Pate at Gresford in Wales (1783)
- Monument to Rev Thomas Edwards at Selattyn (1800)
- Monument to Thomas Lovett at Chirk (1801)
- Monument to Thomas Smith in Rochdale Parish Church (1806)
- Monement to Rev Josias Dawson (1807)
- Monument to Dr John Ford FLS in Chester Cathedral (1807)
- Monument to Benjamin Smith in Rochdale Parish Church (1809)
- Monument to Rev William Loxham in Penwortham (1809)
- Monument to Rev Joseph Venables at Oswestry (1810)
- Monument to Rev Robert Morgan at Llanbedr (1811)
- Huge stele to Alexander Butler at Garstang (1811)
- Monument to Rev Samuel Hall in St Ann's Church, Manchester (1813)
- Monument to Sir Thomas Broughton, 6th baronet at Broughton, Staffordshire (1813)
- Monument to Frances Bower at Stockport (1813)
- Monument to Rev John Hargreaves at Burnley (1813)
- Monument to Henry Blundell in Sefton Church (1813)
- Monument to Elizabeth France at Davenham (1814)
- Monument to Hannah Hale at Audlem (1817)
- Monument to George Johnson in St Peter's Church in Chester (1818)
- Monument to John Lownes in Congleton (c.1820)
- Monument to Anne Rowland wife of John Rowland of Plasbennion at Ruabon (c.1820)
- Monument to Rev E Jones at Ruthin (1823)
- Monument to Rev Thomas Blackburne at Holt near Denbigh (1823)
- Monument to Joseph Brandreth at Ormskirk (1827)
