= Alfred Gatley =

English sculptor

Alfred Gatley (1816 – 28 June 1863) was an English sculptor.

== Life ==
Alfred Gatley was born at Kerridge, about two miles from Macclesfield in Cheshire, in 1816. As a child he learned the use of a stonemason's tools from his father, who owned and worked two quarries in the Kerridge hills. In 1837, helped by a few friends, he came to London and obtained employment in the studio of Edward Hodges Baily. He also studied in the British Museum, and two years later became a student of the Royal Academy, where he gained silver medals for modelling from the antique, and in 1841 for the first time exhibited a "Bust of a Gentleman".

In 1843 Gatley left Baily and became an assistant to Musgrave Watson. That year he sent a marble bust of "Hebe" to the Royal Academy, which was purchased by the Art Union of London and reproduced in bronze. In 1844 he received the silver medal for the best model from the life, and exhibited marble busts of "Cupid" and "Psyche", and in 1846 he exhibited a bust of Marshal Espartero, and a model in bas-relief of "The Hours leading out the Horses of the Sun", which went to the library of Britwell Court, Buckinghamshire. Also in 1846, his Memorial to John Whitaker was installed in Macclesfield. In 1848 he sent to the Royal Academy a bust of John Sumner, archbishop of Canterbury, and in 1850 that of Samuel Christie-Miller, who became his close friend. About 1851 he executed a bust of Richard Hooker, now in the Temple Church.

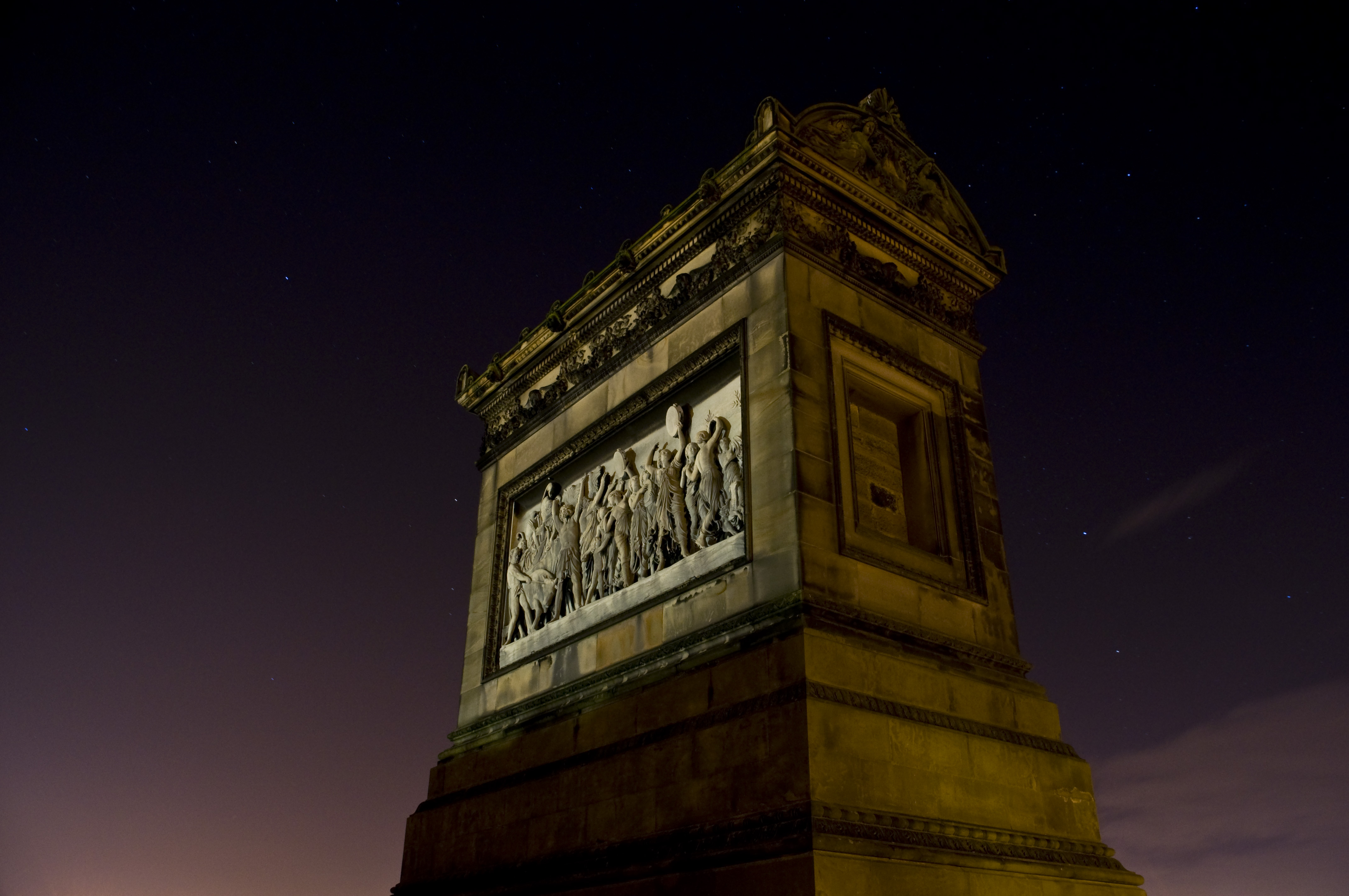
Final resting place of William Henry Miller, designed by David Rhind, with bas relief sculptures by Alfred Gatley, this on the south side depicting "The Song of Moses and Miriam"

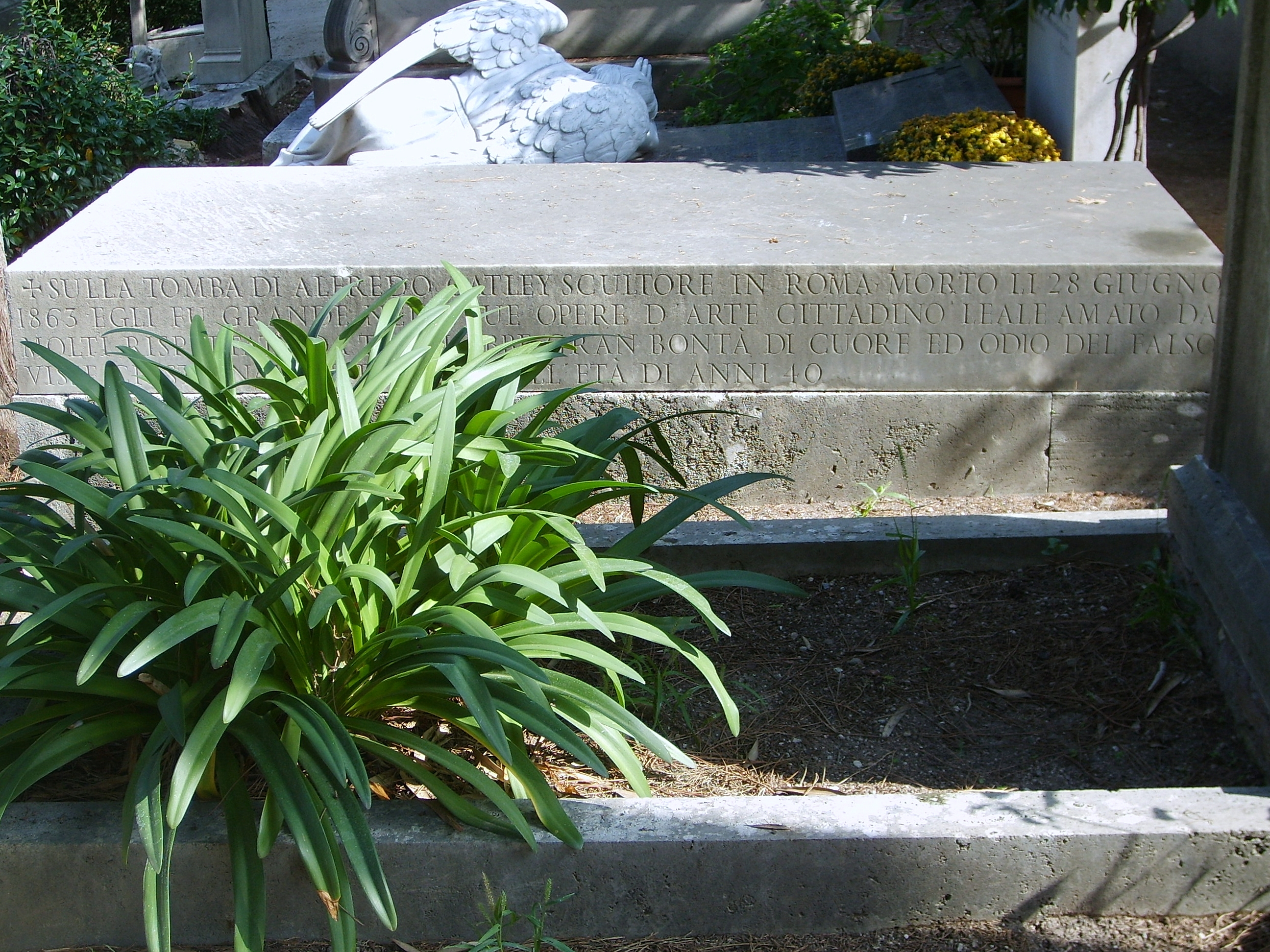
Grave of Alfred Gatley at cimitero acattolico in Rome

Although successful in this and other works, Gatley saw no prospect of earning an adequate income in England, and so went to Rome towards the end of 1852, where he took a studio on the Pincian Hill, and made the acquaintance of John Gibson, whose enthusiasm for Greek art he shared. Before long he completed a bust of "Alastor, or the Spirit of Solitude", and began statues of "Echo" and "Night". A head in marble, "The Angel of Mercy", and a design for a mural monument were his contributions to the Royal Academy in 1853.

Soon after Gatley's settlement in Rome, Samuel Christie-Miller invited him to prepare designs for the sculptural decorations of a mausoleum to be erected to the memory of William Henry Miller at Craigentinny, his estate near Edinburgh. Gatley produced a model of a large bas-relief representing "The Overthrow of Pharaoh in the Red Sea", which was highly praised by Gibson. Early in 1855 he was entrusted with the companion bas-relief, "The Song of Moses and Miriam". The Pharaoh bas-relief was finished in time for the 1862 International Exhibition, but the 'Song of Miriam' was completed only just before the sculptor's death. In the judgement of Robert Edmund Graves, Gatley's DNB biographer, "The two bas-reliefs are in strong contrast to each other, the idea of rejoicing being as powerfully given in the one work as is that of fear and impending destruction in the other".

Gatley visited England for the last time in 1862, but returned to Rome depressed by his failure to dispose of the works which he had sent to the International Exhibition, where, besides the bas-relief of "Pharaoh", he exhibited his statues of "Echo" and "Night", as well as four marble statuettes of recumbent animals—lions, a lioness, and a tiger—which had gained for him in Rome the name of the "Landseer of Sculpture".

He died from dysentery at Rome on 28 June 1863, and was buried in the Protestant cemetery there.

== Legacy ==
His portrait, painted by a Portuguese artist named Da Costa, used to be in the sculptor's old home at Kerridge. His statue of "Echo" is in the Salford Museum and Art Gallery, and there also are a marble group of "A Boy leading a Bull to Sacrifice" (1861), and busts of Euripides and Paris copied in marble from antiques in the Vatican at Rome.
