= Armoury Towers =

- Macclesfield
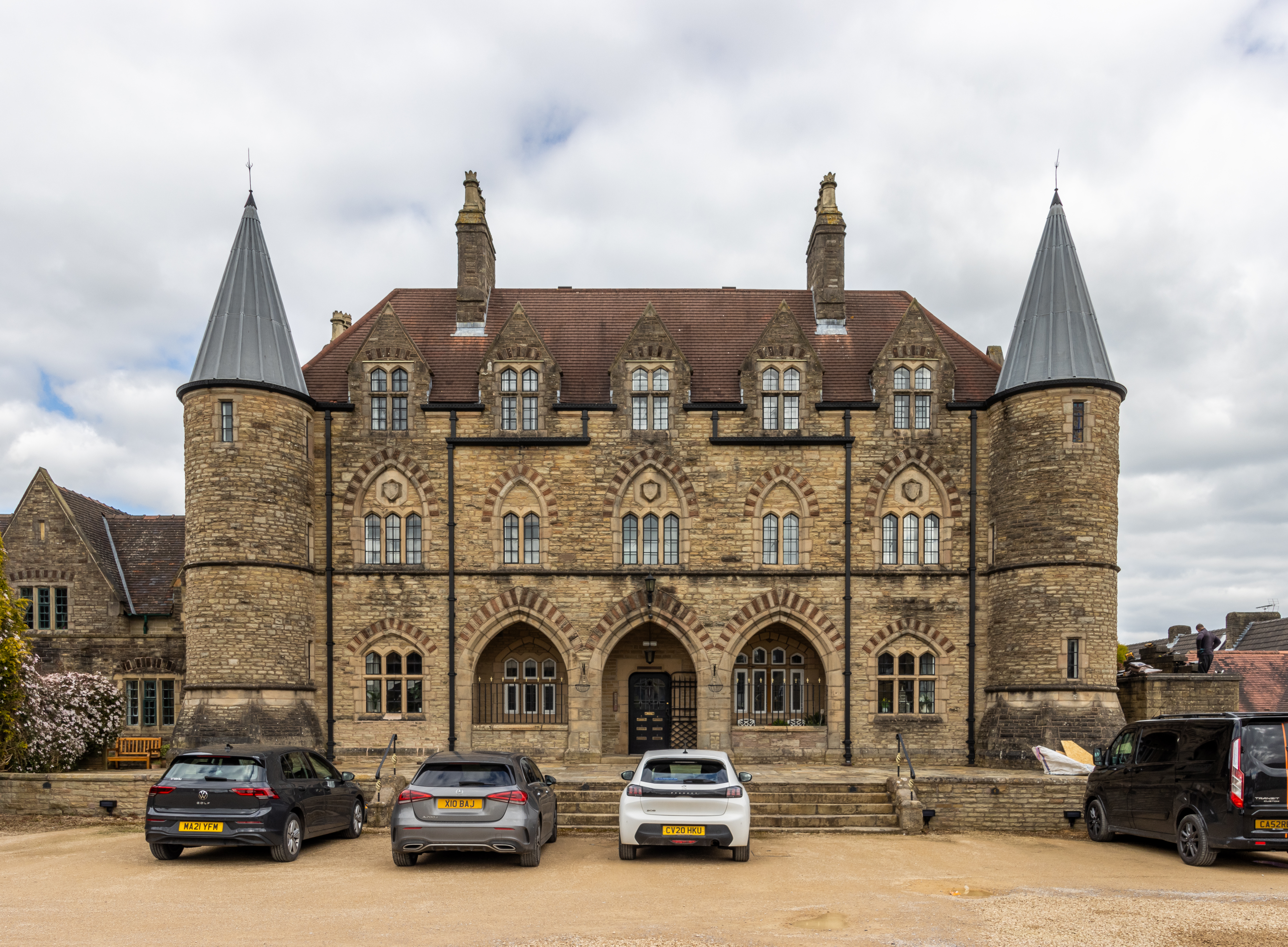
- The main building of Armoury Towers

Site information
- Type: Barracks
- Owner: Private residential

Location
- Location within Cheshire
- Coordinates: 53.2539°N 2.1367°W

Site history
- Built: 1857
- Built for: War Office
- In use: 1857-1980s

Armoury Towers is a former military installation at Macclesfield, Cheshire, England.

== History ==
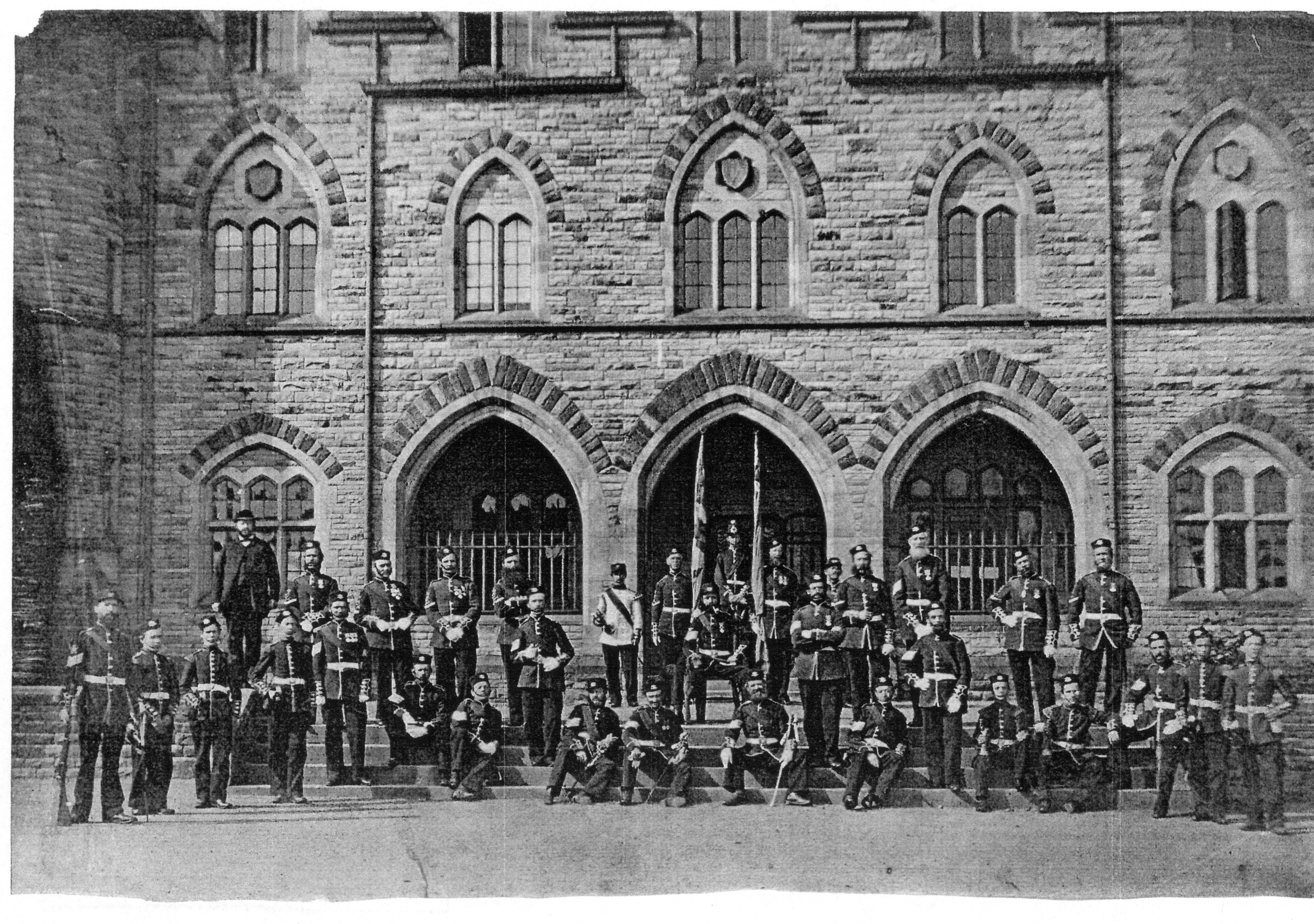
Old photo of Permanent Staff 1868

The need for the construction of barracks followed the raising of the 2nd Royal Cheshire Militia, recruiting in the eastern part of the county (the existing 1st Cheshire Militia was based at Chester). In October 1857 the Cheshire Quarter sessions passed a resolution that "...barracks for the 2nd Regiment of Cheshire Militia be erected in some part of the eastern division of the county." Initially, Stockport was favoured, but a decision to purchase land in Macclesfield was made in January 1858, against the objections of the Mayor and Corporation of the town. The 4th Battalion (2nd Royal Cheshire Regiment of Militia), The Cheshire Regiment was disbanded in 1908 and building was decommissioned and converted for residential use in the 1980s.
