= Richard Crosse (British Army officer) =

British Army officer (1888–1970)

Lieutenant Colonel Richard Banastre Crosse DSO (1888–1970) was a British Army officer who commanded the 2nd Battalion The Oxfordshire and Buckinghamshire Light Infantry (The 52nd) on the Western Front. He was twice awarded the Distinguished Service Order. He later joined the Ulster Special Constabulary.

== Military service ==
Born in 1888, in Macclesfield, Crosse came from a military family. His uncle, Kenrick Crosse, led the assault party at the storming of the Cashmere Gate, Dehli, during the 1857 Indian Mutiny, being the first to liberate the city from the mutineers. Richard Crosse was commissioned as a second lieutenant into the Oxfordshire Light Infantry in 1906 and was posted to the regiment's 2nd Battalion, often known simply as the 52nd. The regiment became the Oxfordshire and Buckinghamshire Light Infantry in 1908 and he was promoted to lieutenant in April 1909 and appointed adjutant of the battalion in March 1913.

Crosse was awarded the DSO in January 1915, several months after the outbreak of World War I. He was appointed captain in May and remained adjutant until February 1916. He was promoted to temporary major in March 1916 and appointed brevet major in June 1916.

On 8 July 1916, Crosse took over command of the 2nd Ox and Bucks (the 52nd) and was granted the temporary rank of lieutenant colonel while in command. He led the battalion in many battles on the Western Front including on the Somme battlefield at Delville Wood, Guillemont and in the battle of Beaumont Hamel: a large attack on the Redan Ridge in the battle of the Ancre. Later battles included the Battle of Arras (1917) and the battle of the Selle. Crosse was awarded a Bar to the DSO in February 1918. He was wounded on 23 August and rejoined the battalion on 2 October 1918 having discharged himself from hospital and he continued treatment through the regimental medical officer. He was Mentioned in Despatches four times. Crosse was appointed a Chevalier of the French Legion of Honour in 1917. During the 1st World War Crosse declined further promotion in order to stay with his battalion which he remained in command of to June 1919.

He retired from the army in February 1923 with the rank of lieutenant colonel and joined the Ulster Special Constabulary in 1924. Crosse wrote a book on the history of his former regiment: titled A Short History of the Oxfordshire and Buckinghamshire Light Infantry 1741 - 1922. He died in Nantwich, in 1970, aged 82.

== Sources ==
- The Oxfordshire and Buckinghamshire Light Infantry (the 43rd/52nd Regiment of Foot) Philip Booth (1971)
- History of the 43rd and 52nd (Oxfordshire and Buckinghamshire) Light Infantry Regiment in the Great War 1914-1918 Vol 11 The 52nd Light Infantry in France and Belgium Simon Harris (2012)
- The Story of the Oxfordshire and Buckinghamshire Light Infantry (The old 43rd and 52nd Regiments) Sir Henry Newbolt (1915)
- The Somme Gary Sheffield (2004)
