= Macclesfield Castle =

Castle in the United Kingdom

- Location within Cheshire

General information
- Architectural style: Fortified manor house
- Location: Macclesfield, Cheshire, England
- Coordinates: 53.258926°N 2.12421°W
- Construction started: 1398
- Demolished: 1932
- Client: John de Macclesfield

Macclesfield Castle (also known as Buckingham Castle or Buckingham Palace) was a fortified manor house in Macclesfield, Cheshire (grid reference SJ91717358). John de Macclesfield began construction of the castle in 1398. It was made from sandstone, and was square with projecting wings. Alterations were made in the 15th century, and it passed through the hands of two families of earls. By 1585 the building was ruinous, and all that survived to the 20th century was the porch. This was dismantled in 1932, and the site reused for cottages and shops.

== History ==
Between 1392 and 1398, John de Macclesfield, an officer in the court of Richard II and Keeper of the Great Wardrobe. began acquiring land in the town of Macclesfield for the purpose of building a manor house. Construction of the house – Macclesfield Castle – began in 1398. In 1398, and again in 1399, Macclesfield applied for a licence to crenellate his new manor house. The historian of the castle, R.C. Turner, attributes this to the crisis towards the end of Richard II's reign. The king died before he could grant Macclesfield's request, however, and was succeeded to the throne by Henry IV. Although he fell out of favour and returned to his home in Macclesfield after being replaced as Keeper of the Wardrobe, John was granted a licence to crenellate in 1410. John de Macclesfield was a commoner, despite his previous position as Keeper of the Wardrobe, and to allow him to fortify his home – which was in the royal borough of Macclesfield – was very unusual.

When John de Macclesfied died in 1422, his estates passed to his bastard children. By 1444, these lands had been bought by Humphrey Stafford, 1st Duke of Buckingham. In the mid-15th century additions were made to the castle. The castle passed from the possession of the Dukes of Buckingham – after whom the house became known as Buckingham Palace or Buckingham Castle – into the hands of the Stanley family, Earls of Derby from 1485. It is assumed that when Henry VII visited the Earl of Derby in Macclesfield in 1496, he stayed at Macclesfield Castle. The castle had fallen into disrepair by the late 16th century, as in 1585 it was described by William Smith as a "huge place all of stone in a manner of a castle – but now gone into much decay".

Parts of the castle were still in use in 1793–1811, when a room of the castle was used by Macclesfield's Roman Catholic congregation. By the 20th century, all that remained of the building was the porch (or gateway) – which dated to the reign of Henry VII – where Palace Yard is now and parts of the curtain wall. Despite plans to preserve the porch, it was dismantled in 1932 and the site reused to build cottages and shops. In 1985, dressed stone that had originally been part of the castle was accidentally discovered, although it was heavily weathered; the site was excavated the same year. The courtyard of Macclesfield Town Hall contains stones from the porch.

== Layout ==
When the castle was described in 1585, Smith recorded that Macclesfield Castle was a square building with projecting wings and decorative towers. Because so little of the building survives, it is unknown whether it had a great hall, but Turner believes the building was probably influenced by the contemporary construction of Bodiam Castle and alterations to Kenilworth Castle; Turner comes to this conclusion as he believes John de Macclesfield would have been involved in organising payment for the construction of these castles in his role as Keeper of the Wardrobe. Macclesfield Castle was constructed from sandstone, and the remains of it which were uncovered in 1985 have not survived well due to weathering. The overall layout and size of Macclesfield Castle is uncertain, but it was probably 140 by 39 yards (128 by 36 m) The porch which survived until 1932 was on the west side and measured 4.5 metres (15 ft) square and 7.31 metres (24.0 ft) high. It was built from coursed rubble sandstone and faced with ashlar; it probably had a castellated parapet. Unusually, it featured a vaulted interior with an unusual Tudor rose, dating it to the reign of Henry VII.

== See also ==
- Buckingham Palace – palace built for the Dukes of Buckingham in 1703
- List of castles in Cheshire
