= Macclesfield =

Town and civil parish in Cheshire, England

Coordinates: 53.25°N 2.13°W

- Town
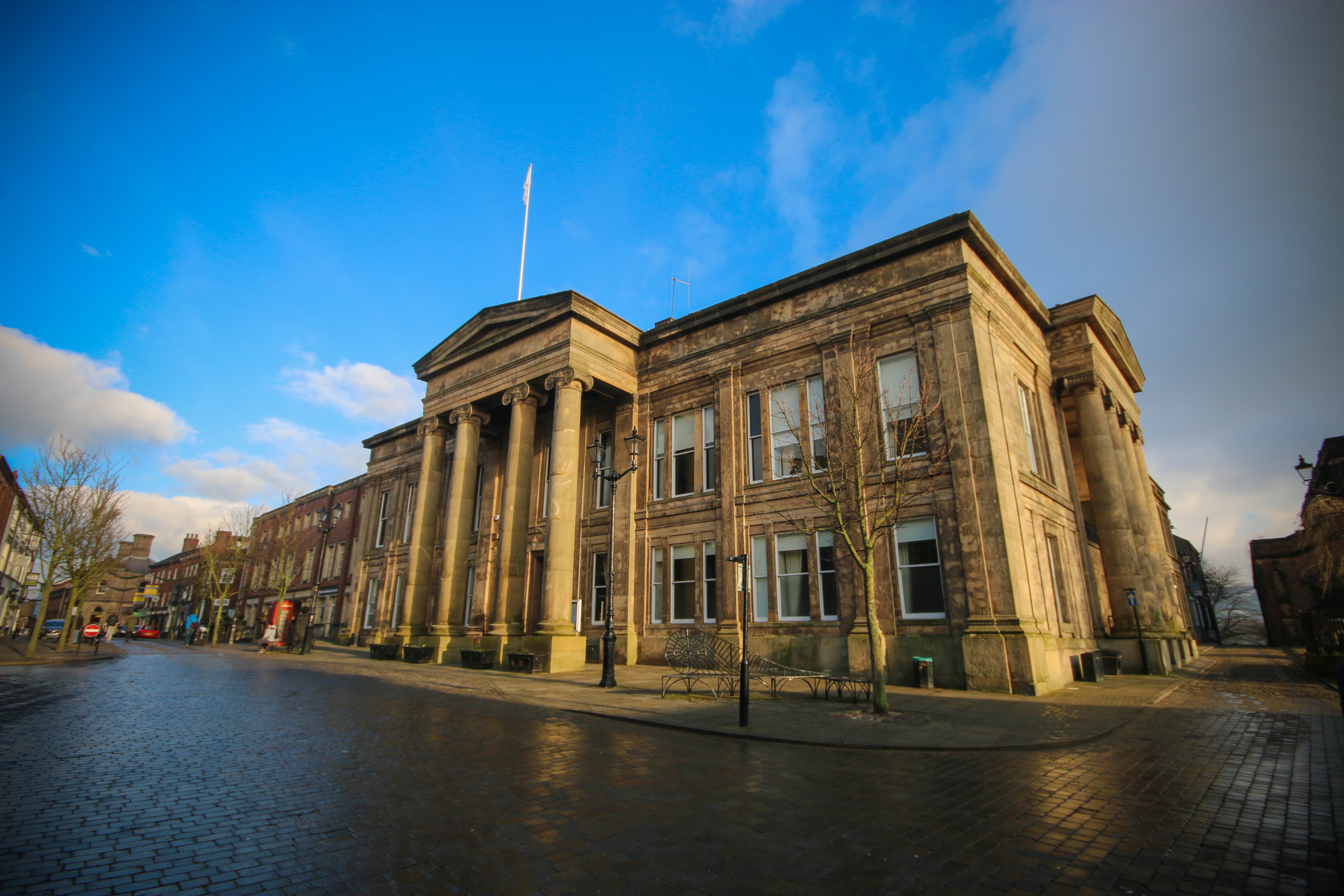
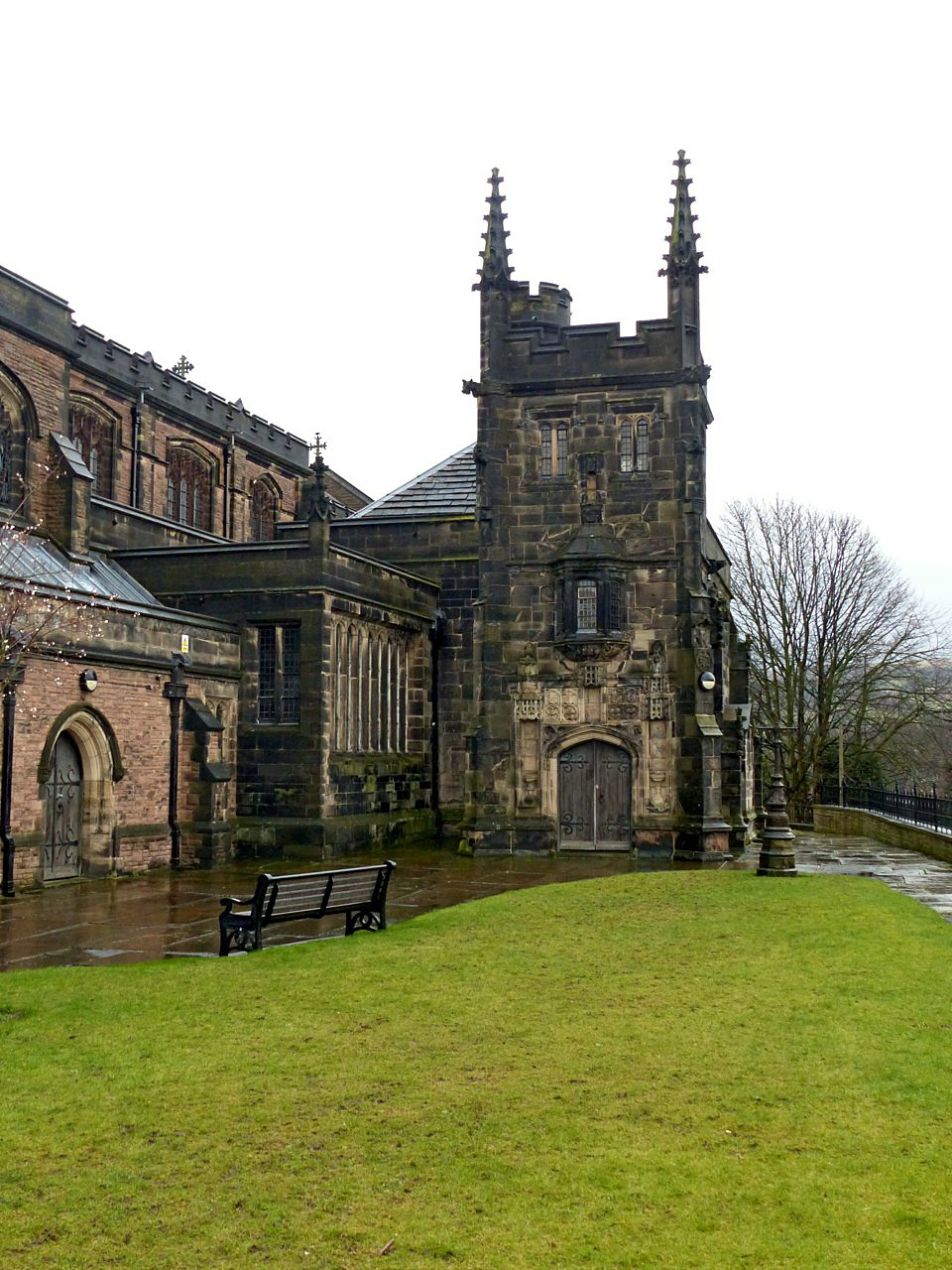
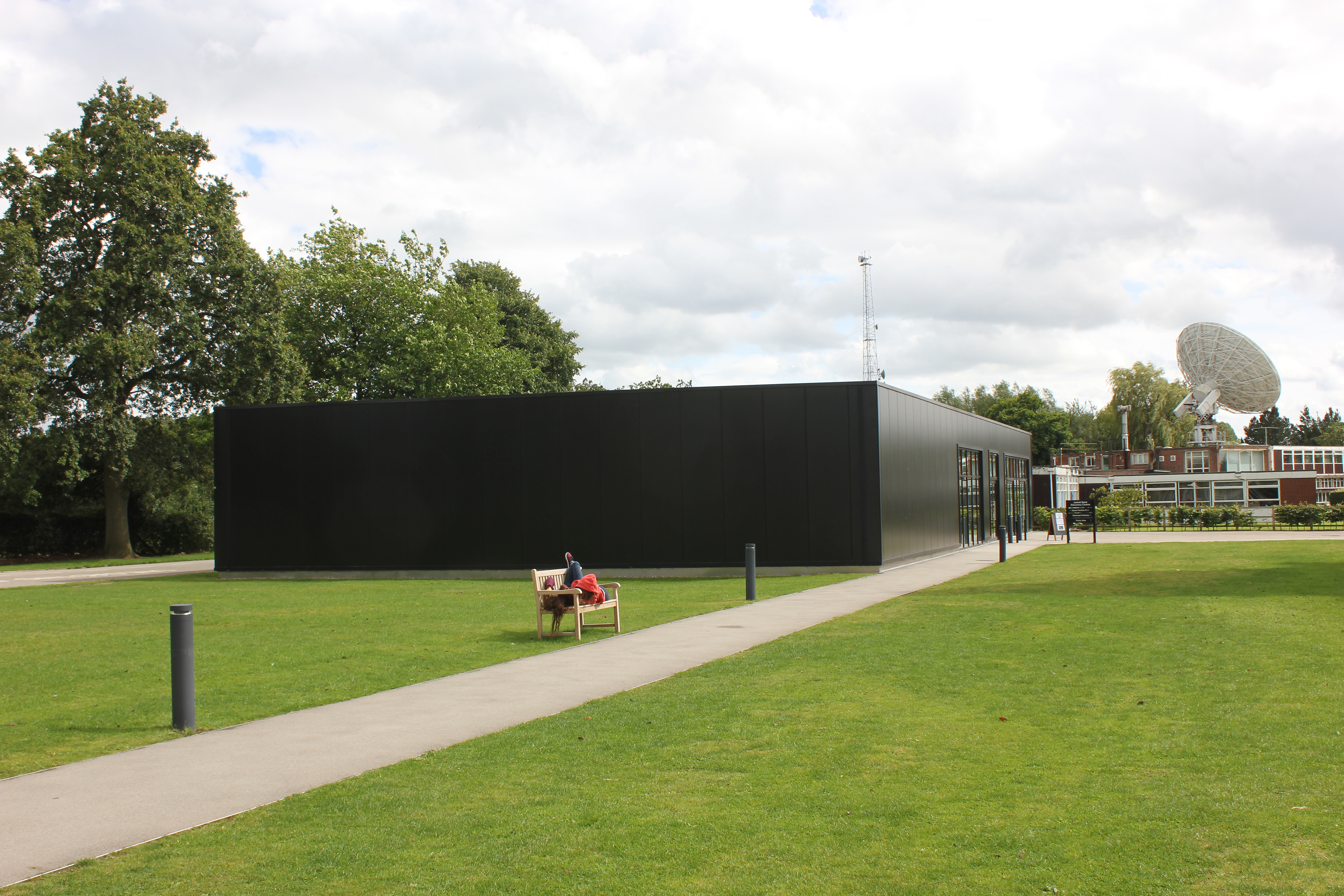
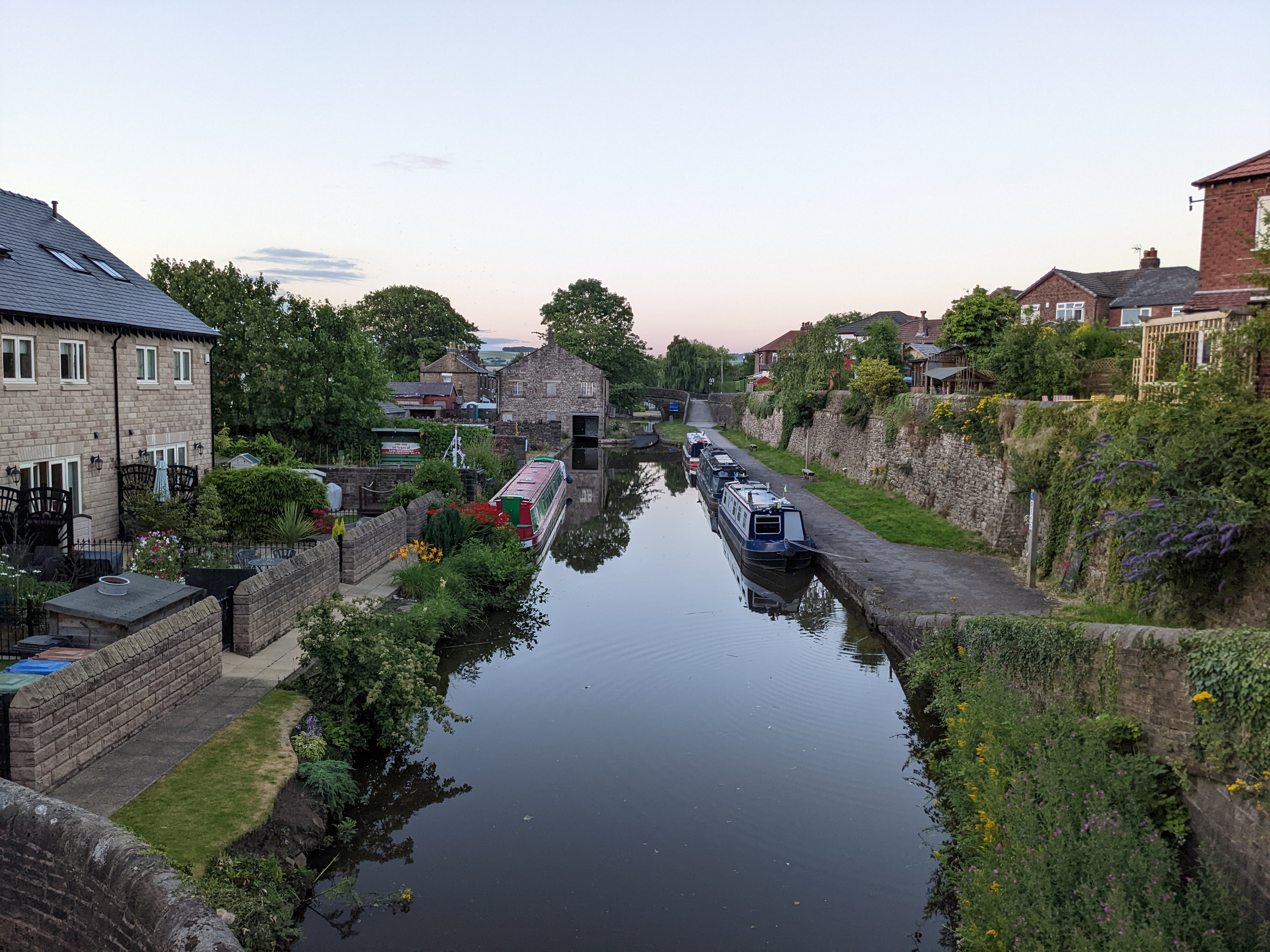
- Town Hall St Michael's Church Jodrell Bank Observatory Macclesfield Canal

- Location within Cheshire
- Population: 52,496 (Parish, 2021); 54,345 (Built up area, 2021)
- OS grid reference: SJ9173
  - London: 148 mi (238 km) SE
- Civil parish: Macclesfield
- Unitary authority: Cheshire East
- Ceremonial county: Cheshire
- Region: North West
- Country: England
- Sovereign state: United Kingdom
- Post town: MACCLESFIELD
- Postcode district: SK10, SK11
- Dialling code: 01625
- Police: Cheshire
- Fire: Cheshire
- Ambulance: North West
- UK Parliament: Macclesfield
- Website: macclesfield-tc.gov.uk

Macclesfield (/ˈmækəlzfiəld/) is a market town and civil parish in the unitary authority of Cheshire East, Cheshire, England, on the River Bollin and the edge of the Cheshire Plain, with Macclesfield Forest to its east, 16 miles (26 km) south of Manchester and 38 miles (61 km) east of Chester.

Before the Norman Conquest, Macclesfield was held by Edwin, Earl of Mercia and was assessed at £8. The medieval town grew up on the hilltop around what is now St Michael's Church. It was granted a municipal charter in 1261. Macclesfield Grammar School was founded in 1502. The town had a silk-button industry from at least the middle of the 17th century and became a major silk-manufacturing centre from the mid-18th century. The Macclesfield Canal was constructed in 1826–31.

Hovis breadmakers were another Victorian employer; modern industries include pharmaceuticals, such as Astra Zeneca. Multiple mill buildings are still standing and several of the town's museums explore the local silk industry. Other landmarks include Georgian buildings such as the Town Hall and former Sunday School; St Alban's Church, designed by Augustus Pugin; and the Arighi Bianchi furniture shop.

At the 2021 census the population of the parish was 52,496 and the population of the built up area was 54,345. A person from the town is referred to as a Maxonian. (Note: Maxonian was coined originally to identify a group of alumni of the King's School at Oxford University as a portmanteau of Macclesfield and Oxonian; it was then applied to residents of the town in general.)

== Toponymy ==
The town is recorded in the Domesday Book as Maclesfeld and in 1183 it was referred to as Makeslesfeld. The English Place-Name Society gives its name as being derived from the Old English name, Maccel, and field, yielding the meaning "Maccel's open country".

Although "Silk Town" seems to be its preferred nickname, the traditional nickname of Macclesfield is "Treacle Town". This refers to an historical incident when a horse-drawn wagon overturned and spilt its load of treacle onto the street, after which the poor scooped the treacle off the road.

== History ==
Before the Norman Conquest, Macclesfield was held by Edwin, Earl of Mercia, who also held much of the east of the county. Three crosses survive from this period, originally located in Sutton and now in West Park, and J. D. Bu'Lock speculates that there might have been a Pre-Conquest church. The area was devastated by the Normans in 1070, and had not recovered by 1086; the Domesday Book records the manor as having fallen in value from £8 to 20 shillings. Hugh d'Avranches, Earl of Chester held the manor himself after the Conquest; there was a mill, meadow for oxen, and woodland 6 leagues by 4 leagues. A Norman castle was built at Macclesfield.

At the time of the Domesday Book, Macclesfield was in the hundred of Hamestan. By the 13th century, the Hundreds of Cheshire had been reorganised, and the town gave its name to the Macclesfield Hundred, which covered a similar area to the old Hamestan Hundred in the east of the county.

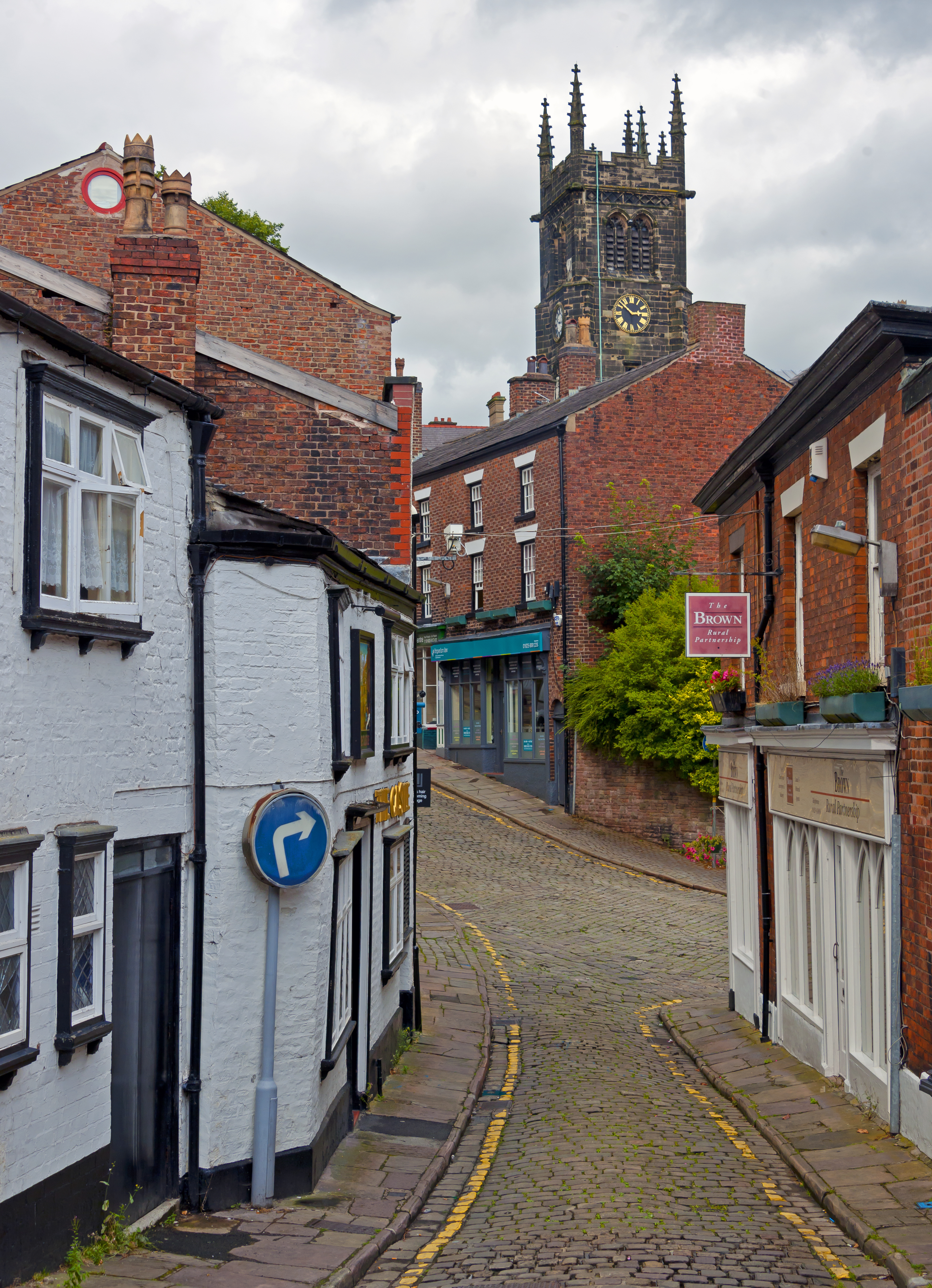
Church Street heading up the hill towards St Michael's Church

Macclesfield was granted a borough charter in 1261 by Edward, Earl of Chester, eldest son of Henry III; Edward later became king as Edward I. Although the 1261 charter purported to create the borough, there was reputedly an earlier charter, possibly granted by Ranulf de Blondeville, 6th Earl of Chester, in the early 13th century. The 1261 charter gave the right to hold a market, fair and judicial courts. The medieval town stood on the hilltop, centred on All Saints' Church (later renamed St Michael's), which was built in 1278, an extension of a chapel built in approximately 1220. In 1357, a hall was built in the town for the mayor's court and the borough court (portmote). The town lacked industries at this date and was described as poor, remaining a small market town until the end of the 15th century, with a population numbered in the hundreds.

The Cheshire archers were a body of elite soldiers noted for their skills with the longbow that fought in many engagements in Britain and France in the Middle Ages. Battles at which there were sizeable numbers of Cheshire archers include Agincourt and Crecy. In 1277 Edward I employed 100 of these archers from the Macclesfield area as his personal bodyguard, his successor Richard II also employed a bodyguard of these yeoman archers who came from the Macclesfield Hundred and the forest districts of Cheshire.

The borough had a weekly market and two annual fairs: the Barnaby fair on St Barnabas day (11 June), the other on the feast of All Souls (2 November). In recent years the Barnaby fair has been reinvented as the Barnaby Festival, a cultural festival in mid-June. The weekly market no longer happens but on the last Sunday of each month the Treacle Market is held, a large market selling locally produced food and handmade items such as clothing, handmade goods and pottery.

Macclesfield was the administrative centre of the Hundred of Macclesfield, which occupied most of east Cheshire. The Earl of Chester's manor of Macclesfield was very large, and its boundary extended to Disley. The manor house was on the edge of the deer park, on the west of the town. In the 14th century, it had a king's chamber and a queen's hall, as well as a large stable, and the manor served as a stud farm for Edward the Black Prince. The Earls of Chester established the Forest of Macclesfield, which was much larger than its present-day namesake. It was used for hunting deer and pasturing sheep and cattle. By the end of the 13th century, large areas of the forest had been ploughed because of the pressure of population growth. In 1356, two trees from the forest were given to archer William Jauderell to repair his home.

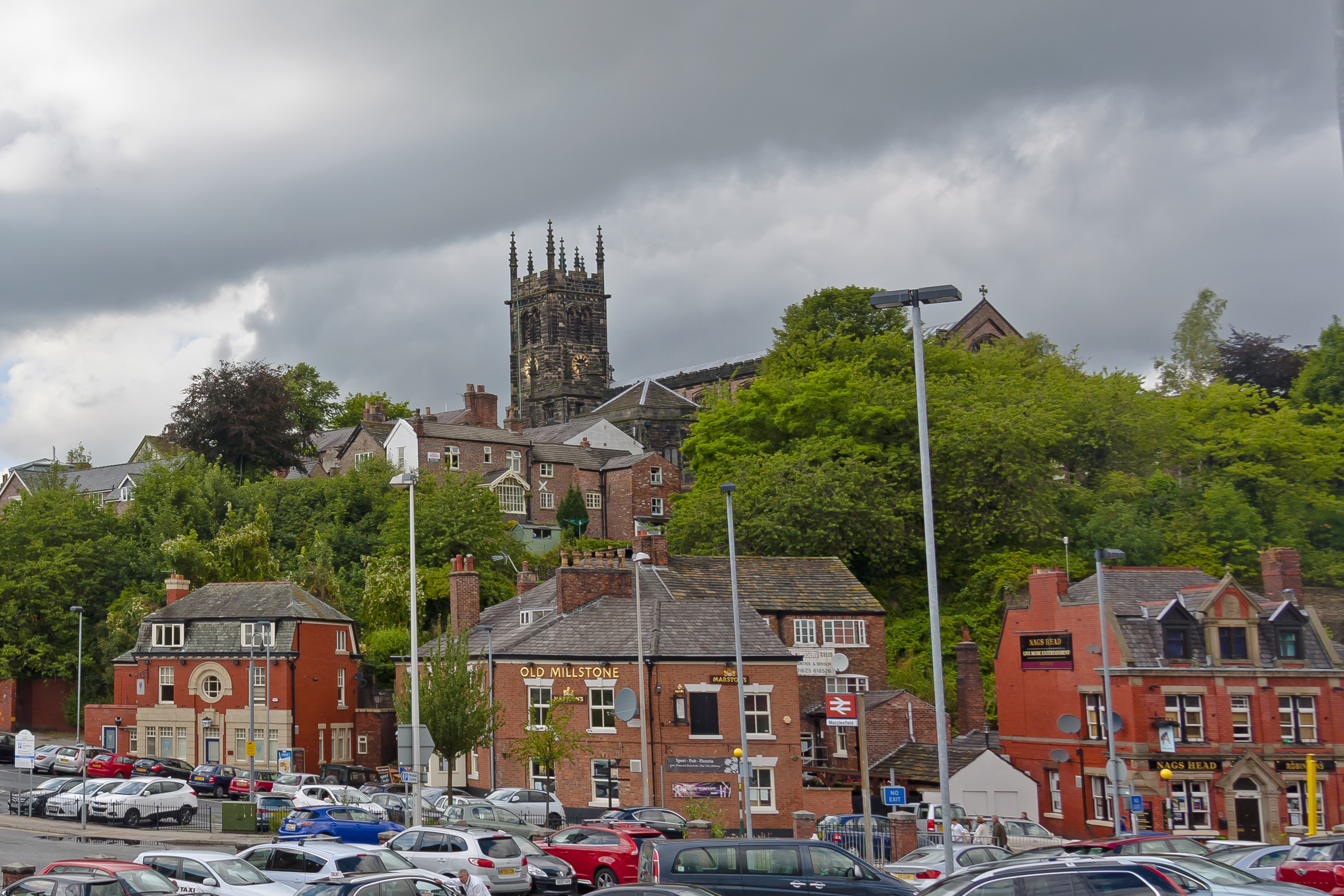
Macclesfield as viewed from the railway station

Macclesfield Castle was a fortified town house built by John de Macclesfield in the later Middle Ages. Construction began in 1398, and that year an application was made for a licence to crenellate, or fortify, the building. Two chantries were founded in the town: one in 1422 by the Legh family, and one in 1504 by Thomas Savage. In 1502, Macclesfield Grammar School was founded by Sir John Percyvale.

No proof exists that Macclesfield was ever a walled town. When the settlement was first established and for some centuries afterwards there would have certainly been some sort of ditch and palisade round the western side of the town which was not naturally defended. This was necessary in order to keep out undesirable people and stray animals. No physical trace of a ditch remains though measurements and the shape of certain streets suggest where such a ditch could have been and most of the medieval building were within this area. It is unlikely that the ditch and palisade were succeeded by a wall for no record has been found of a murage tax, which would certainly have been levied to keep the wall in repair.

The suffix "gate" in the names of several Macclesfield streets has been taken to indicate the former presence of a gate in the sense of a guarded opening in a wall; however, this is very unlikely as the term 'gate' is derived from gata, Scandinavian for road, which became gate in Middle English. Therefore, Chester Gate, the Jordan Gate and the Church Wall Gate (some sources give the name Well Gate for this gate), are simply referring to the road to/from Chester or the road leading from the church to the well. These names are preserved in the names of three streets in the town, Chestergate, Jordangate and Back Wallgate, which have several older and listed buildings.

A charter of 1595 established a town governing body consisting of the mayor, two aldermen and 24 "capital burgesses", and the powers of this body were increased by a charter of 1684. By the Tudor era, Macclesfield was prospering, with industries including the manufacture of harnesses, gloves and especially buttons, and later ribbons, tapes and fancy ware. Coal was mined from the 16th century. In 1664, the population was around 2,600, making Macclesfield the third-largest town in the county, after Chester and Nantwich, although the town had expanded little from its medieval extent and had fewer large houses than Nantwich and Stockport. By around 1720, the number of households had increased to 925, and this rapid population growth continued throughout the 18th century, reaching 8,743 in 1801.

In the 1580s, Macclesfield was one of the earliest towns in the county to have Puritan preaching "Exercises", and it was also an early centre for the Quakers. By 1718 an estimated 10% of the population was Nonconformist. Towards the end of that century, the town had a large Methodist congregation, and Christ Church was the only Anglican church in the county to invite John Wesley to preach.

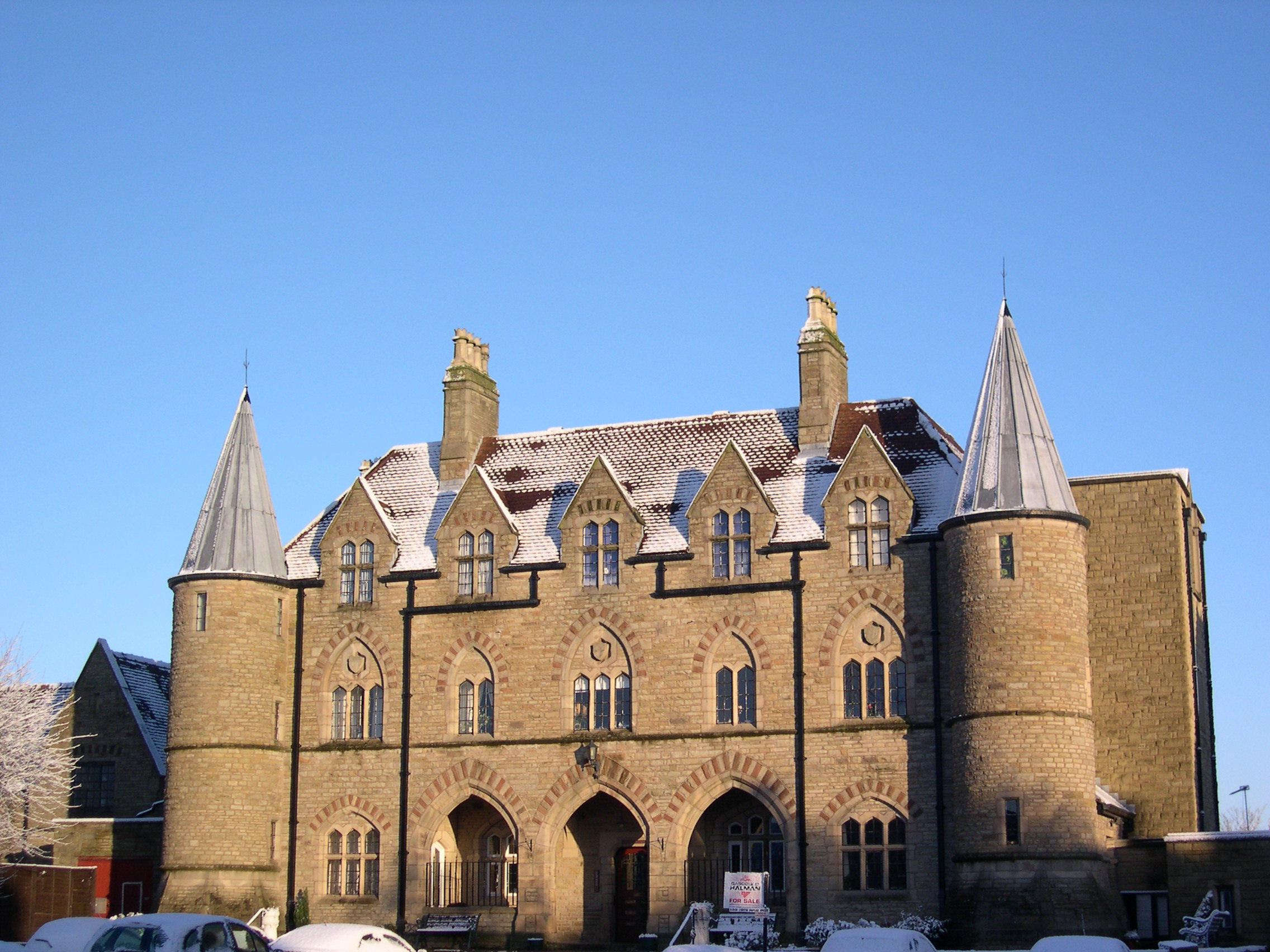
Armoury Towers

During the Civil War, in 1642 the town was occupied for the King by Sir Thomas Aston, a Royalist. In the Jacobite Rising of 1745, Charles Stuart and his army marched through Macclesfield as they attempted to reach London. The mayor was forced to welcome the prince, and the event is commemorated in one of the town's silk tapestries. Cumberland House on Jordangate is so named after the Duke of Cumberland who stayed there in 1745 when pursuing the fleeing Prince.

The population was 24,137 by 1841.

Armoury Towers was completed in 1858 and the Bridge Street drill hall was completed in 1871.

=== Industry ===
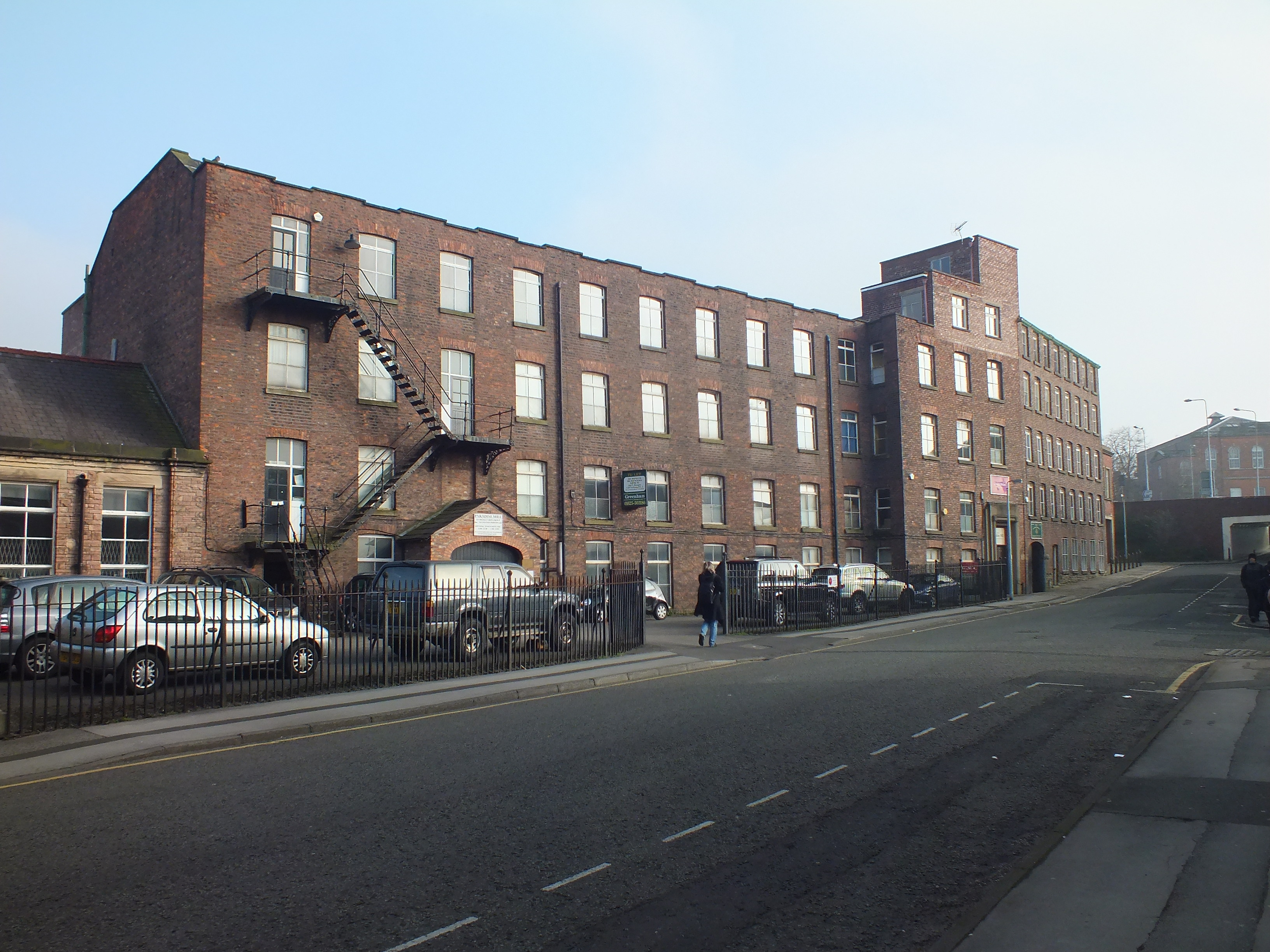
Paradise Mill

Macclesfield was once the world's biggest producer of finished silk. A domestic button industry had been established in the town by the mid-16th century, although the first mention of silk buttons is not until 1649. In the mid-18th century, when metal buttons became fashionable, the silk-button industry transitioned to silk manufacture in mills. Macclesfield's first silk mill was founded by Charles Roe in 1743 or 1744. The mills were initially powered by water, and later by steam. There were 71 silk mills operating in 1832, employing 10,000 people, but a crash occurred in 1851 and many mill-workers emigrated to the American silk town of Paterson, New Jersey. The silk industry remained active in the town in the 1980s, but no longer dominated. Paradise Mill reopened in 1984 as a working mill museum, demonstrating the art of silk throwing and Jacquard weaving. The four Macclesfield Museums display a range of information and products from that period.

A short-lived copper-smelting operation was established by Roe in 1750, processing ore from mines at Alderley Edge and Ecton (Staffordshire), and later from Anglesey. The business switched to copper processing and the manufacture of brass in 1767, before closing after Roe's death in 1781. The industry is reflected in some of the town's street names.

Between 1826 and 1831 the Macclesfield Canal was constructed, linking Macclesfield to Marple to the north and Kidsgrove to the south. The canal was surveyed for its Act of Parliament by the canal and roads engineer Thomas Telford, and built by William Crosley (junior), the Macclesfield Canal Company's engineer. It was the last narrow canal to be completed and had only limited success because within ten years much of the coal and other potential cargo was increasingly being transported by rail.

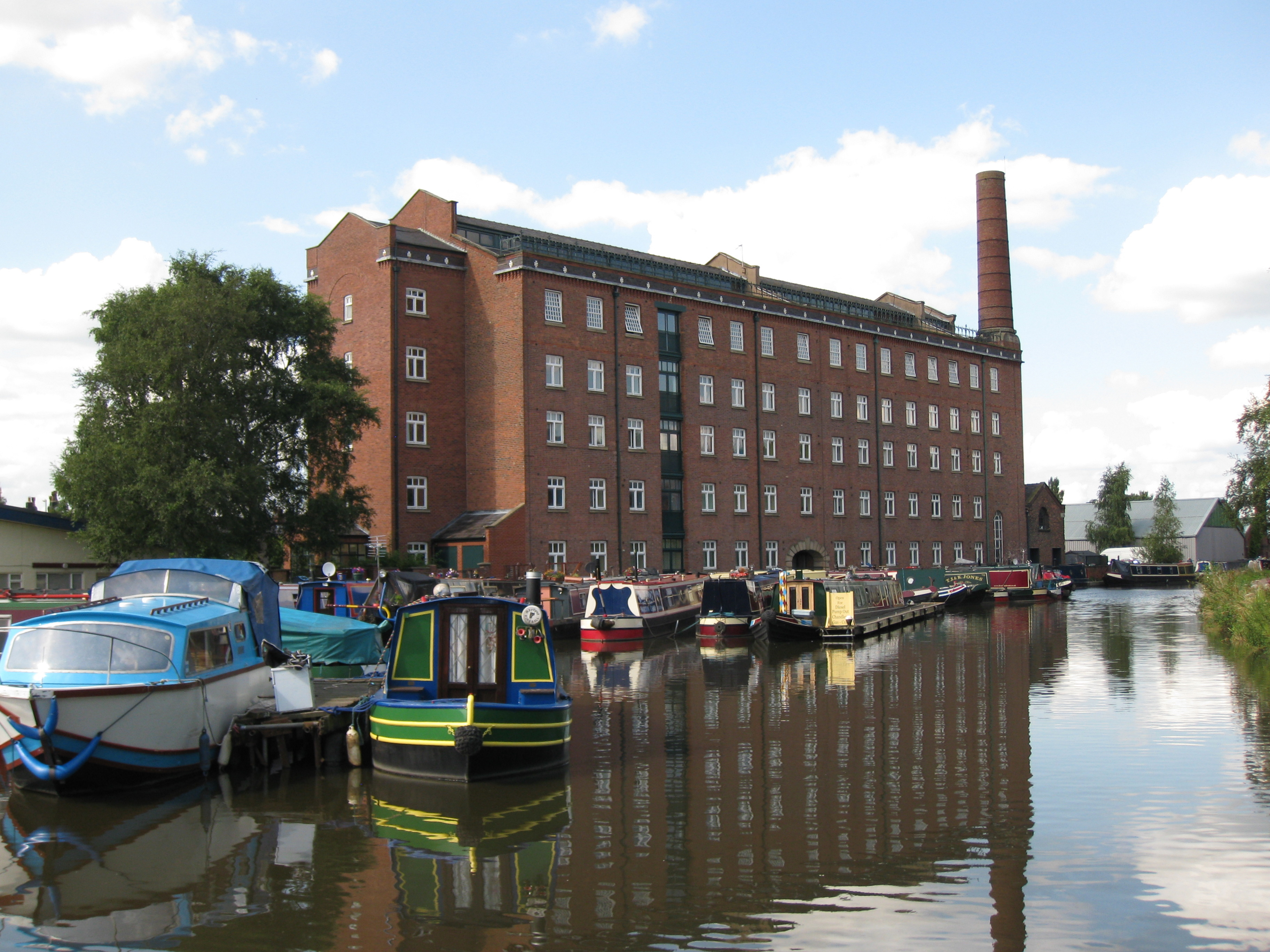
Hovis Mill on the Macclesfield Canal in the town.

Macclesfield is the original home of Hovis breadmakers, produced in Publicity Works Mill (commonly referred to as "the Hovis Mill") on the canal close to Buxton Road. It was founded by a Macclesfield businessman and a baker from Stoke-on-Trent. Hovis is said to derive from the Latin "homo-vitalis" (strength for man) as a way of providing a cheap and nutritious food for poor mill workers and was a very dry and dense wholemeal loaf completely different from the modern version.

Waters Green was once home to a nationally known horse market which features in the legend of the Wizard of Alderley Edge. Waters Green and an area opposite Arighi Bianchi, now hidden under the Silk Road, also held a sheep and cattle market until the 1980s.

Macclesfield is said to be the only mill town to have escaped bombing in World War II. After the war, two pharmaceutical companies opened facilities in Macclesfield, Geigy (now part of Novartis) and the pharmaceutical division of ICI (now AstraZeneca).

== Governance ==
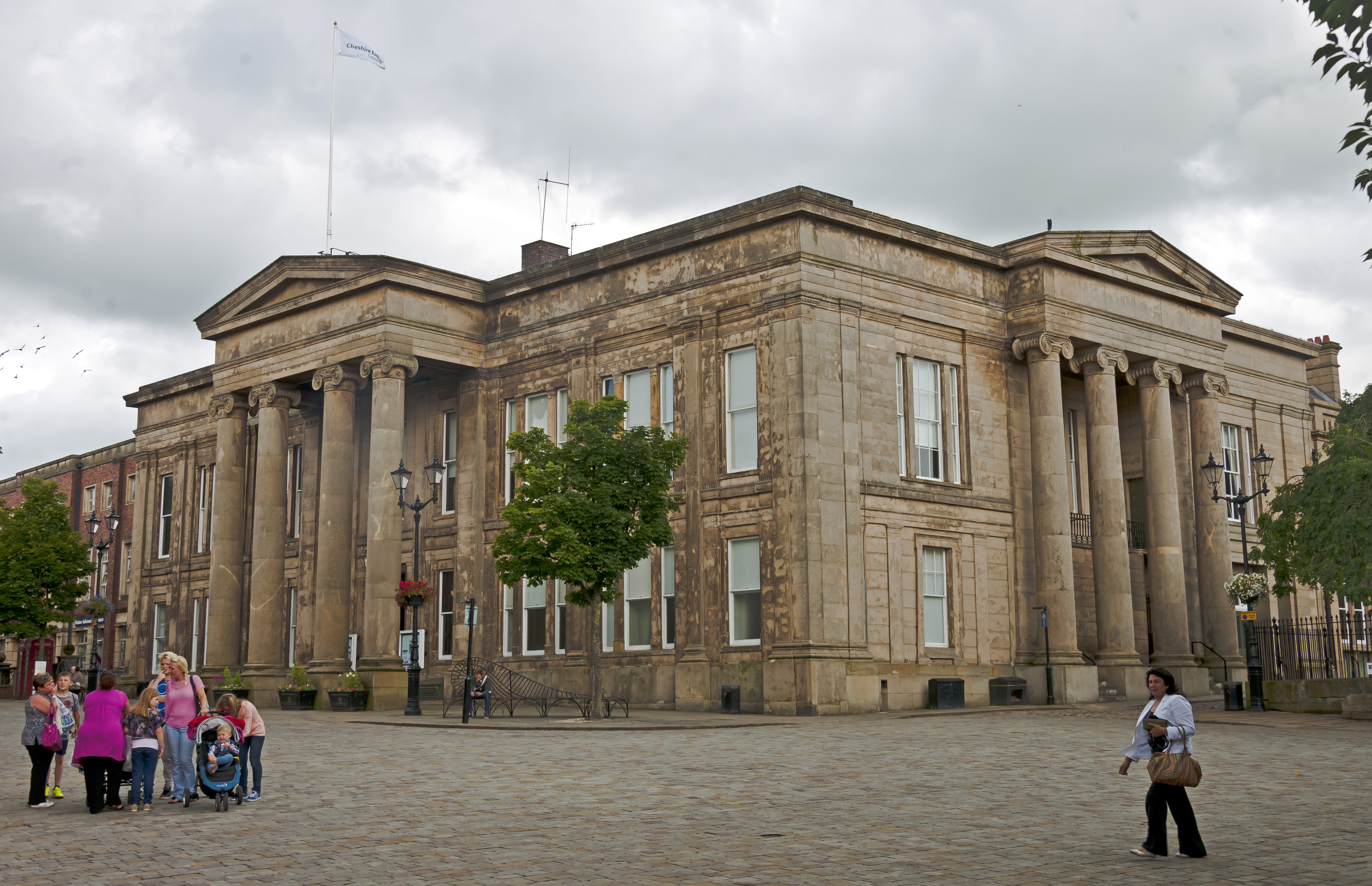
Town Hall, Market Place

There are two tiers of local government covering Macclesfield, at civil parish (town) and unitary authority level: Macclesfield Town Council and Cheshire East Council. The town council is based at the Town Hall on Market Place, and Cheshire East Council also uses the building as an area office.

For national elections, the town forms part of the Macclesfield constituency, which has been represented by Tim Roca of Labour since the 2024 general election.

=== Administrative history ===
Macclesfield was historically a township in the ancient parish of Prestbury. From the 17th century onwards, parishes were gradually given various civil functions under the Poor Laws, in addition to their original ecclesiastical functions. In some cases, including Prestbury, the civil functions were exercised by each township separately rather than the parish as a whole. In 1866, the legal definition of 'parish' was changed to be the areas used for administering the poor laws, and so Macclesfield became a civil parish.

Macclesfield was also a chapelry from at least the 13th century, when St Michael's Church (originally dedicated to All Saints) was built as a chapel of ease to St Peter's Church, Prestbury. St Michael's formally became a parish church in 1835, when Macclesfield was made a separate ecclesiastical parish from Prestbury.

The Macclesfield township was administered as a borough from at least the time of its 1261 charter. The borough was administered from a guildhall in the Market Place from at least the 13th century. Macclesfield Town Hall was completed in 1824 on the site of the guildhall.

A Macclesfield constituency was created in 1832, covering the borough plus adjoining parts of the townships of Hurdsfield and Sutton, where the urban area had grown beyond the borough boundaries. The borough was reformed in 1836 to become a municipal borough under the Municipal Corporations Act 1835, which standardised how most boroughs operated across the country. As part of the 1836 reforms, the borough was enlarged to match the constituency.

The result of the 1880 general election for the Macclesfield constituency was declared void due to corruption, and no by-election was allowed to be held. In 1885, the constituency was replaced by a much larger county constituency, also called Macclesfield, which took in surrounding towns and villages as well as the borough of Macclesfield.

The municipal borough of Macclesfield was abolished in 1974 under the Local Government Act 1972. A much larger non-metropolitan borough of Macclesfield was created instead, which also covered an extensive surrounding area, including the towns of Bollington, Knutsford, and Wilmslow.

In 2009, Cheshire East Council was created, taking over the functions of the borough council and Cheshire County Council, which were both abolished. The area of the pre-1974 municipal borough of Macclesfield had been unparished since the 1974 reforms; a new civil parish of Macclesfield was created covering the area in 2015, with its parish council adopting the name Macclesfield Town Council.

== Geography ==
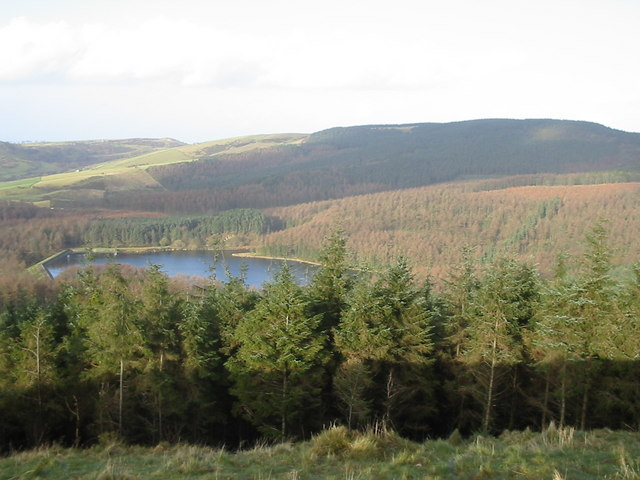
Macclesfield Forest and the Trentabank Reservoir

Macclesfield is in the east of Cheshire and on the River Bollin, a tributary of the River Mersey. It is close to the county borders of Greater Manchester to the north, Derbyshire to the east and Staffordshire to the south. It is near the towns of Stockport to the north, Buxton to the east and Congleton to the south. It is 38 miles (60 km) to the east of Chester, the county town of Cheshire.

To the west of the town lies the Cheshire Plain; Macclesfield Forest is to the east, containing Ridgegate and Trentabank Reservoirs which supply the town's drinking water, as well as Tegg's Nose and the Peak District.

According to the 2011 Census, the gender makeup of the population was 31,266 male and 32,688 female. The ethnic makeup of the whole urban area was under 96.2% white and 2.2% Asian; other ethnic minorities were 1.6%. The religious make up of the whole area includes: 66.3% Christian, 0.5% Muslim, 24.8% irreligious and 6.8% not stated.

=== Climate ===
Like most of the United Kingdom, Macclesfield has a temperate maritime climate (Köppen: Cfb). Records of the climate extend back to at least 1850. Between 1881 and 2005, the highest temperature has been 38 °C (100 °F) on 19 July 2022 and the lowest, from at least 1850–2005, −16.7 °C (1.9 °F) on 25 December 1860.

== Landmarks ==
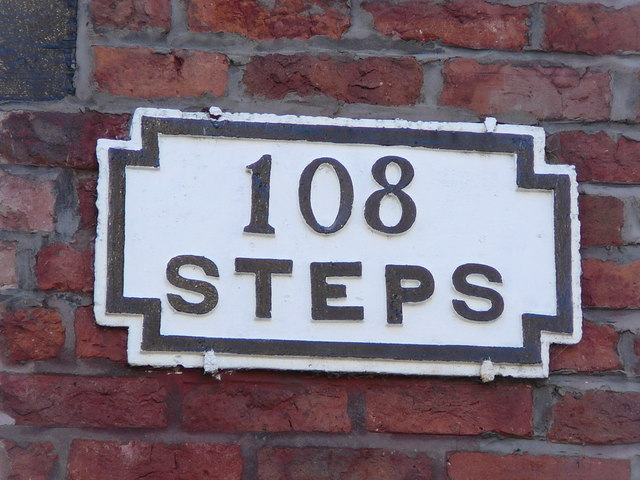
108 steps sign, located on Churchside, at the top of the "108 Steps" down to Waters Green.

The town is famous for its once thriving silk industry, commemorated in the Silk Museum.

The Georgian Town Hall was designed by Francis Goodwin in 1823.

Macclesfield is home to an Augustus Pugin church, St Alban's on Chester Road.

The former Cheshire County Asylum on Pavilion Way was designed by Robert Griffiths in Italianate style. It is now converted into apartments.

== Economy ==
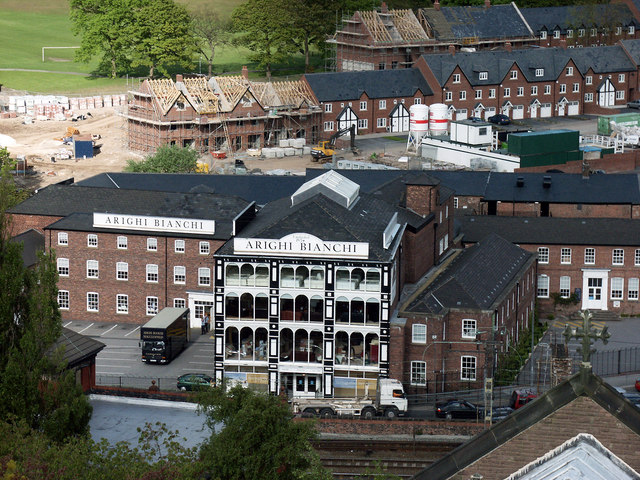
Arighi Bianchi store, located on the "Silk Road" A523.

Macclesfield is the manufacturing home to AstraZeneca, one of the world's largest pharmaceutical companies. The furniture store Arighi Bianchi was founded in 1829. Other industries include textiles, light engineering, paper and plastics.

== Transport ==
=== Railway ===
Macclesfield station is on the Stafford to Manchester branch of the West Coast Main Line. There are generally four trains per hour in each direction, served by three train operating companies:

- Avanti West Coast operates one inter-city service an hour between Manchester Piccadilly (20 minutes away), Stockport (10 minutes), Stoke-on-Trent (15 minutes) and London Euston (1 hour 47 minutes)
- CrossCountry operates two inter-city services an hour: one between Manchester Piccadilly, Stockport, Birmingham New Street, Reading, Southampton Central and Bournemouth; the other between Manchester Piccadilly, Stockport and Birmingham New Street, with most services continuing to Bristol Temple Meads and two per day on to Paignton
- Northern Trains provides hourly stopping services between Manchester Piccadilly, Stockport, Congleton and Stoke-on-Trent.

A railway station was first opened at Beech Lane by the London and North Western Railway on 19 June 1849, which was replaced a month later by Hibel Road station. The current station dates from the modernisation of the West Coast Main Line in the mid-1960s, when the old station buildings were replaced.

=== Buses ===
Macclesfield has a bus station located within the town centre. The original building opened on Sunderland Street, just outside the railway station; it was replaced in 2004, when a new bus station opened on Queen Victoria Street.

The principal operators around Macclesfield are two subsidiaries of Centrebus Group: D&G Bus and High Peak Buses. Fifteen bus routes run within the town and to other locations including Altrincham, Buxton, Congleton, Crewe, Knutsford, Stockport, Wilmslow and Wythenshawe.

=== Roads ===
Macclesfield is served by good road links from the north, south and west, but has fewer roads going east due to the terrain of the Peak District. From the south, access from Congleton and the Potteries is from the A536, and via the A523 from Leek. From the north, the main access to the town is the A523 from Manchester, Hazel Grove and Poynton. The main west–east road is the A537 Knutsford to Buxton road. At various points around the town centre, some of these roads combine, such as the A537 / A523 on the Silk Road section, giving rise to traffic congestion, especially at peak times. The A538 provides access to Prestbury, Wilmslow and Manchester Airport, with the B5470 being the only other eastbound route from the town, heading to Whaley Bridge and Chapel-en-le-Frith.

== Culture ==
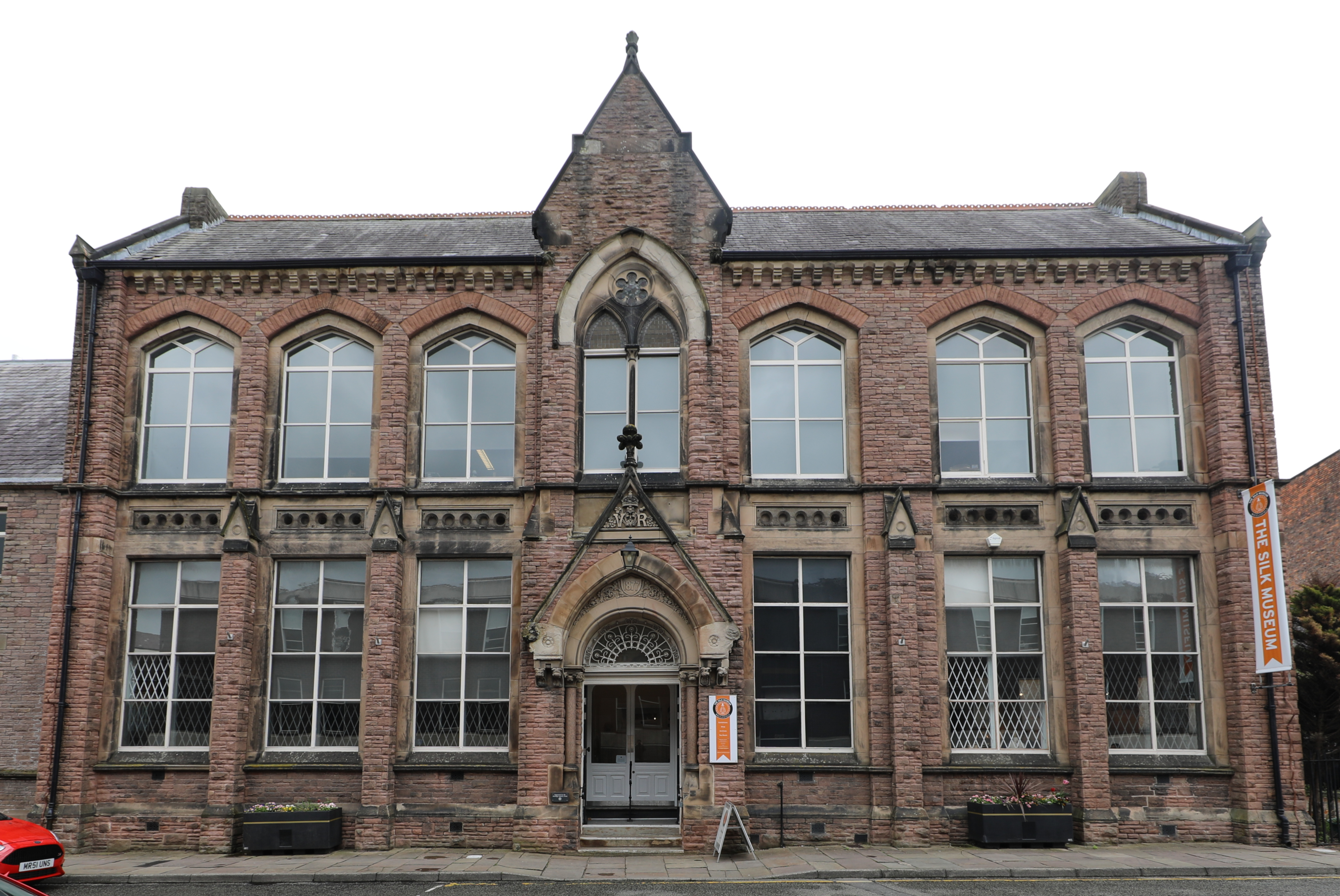
Silk Museum

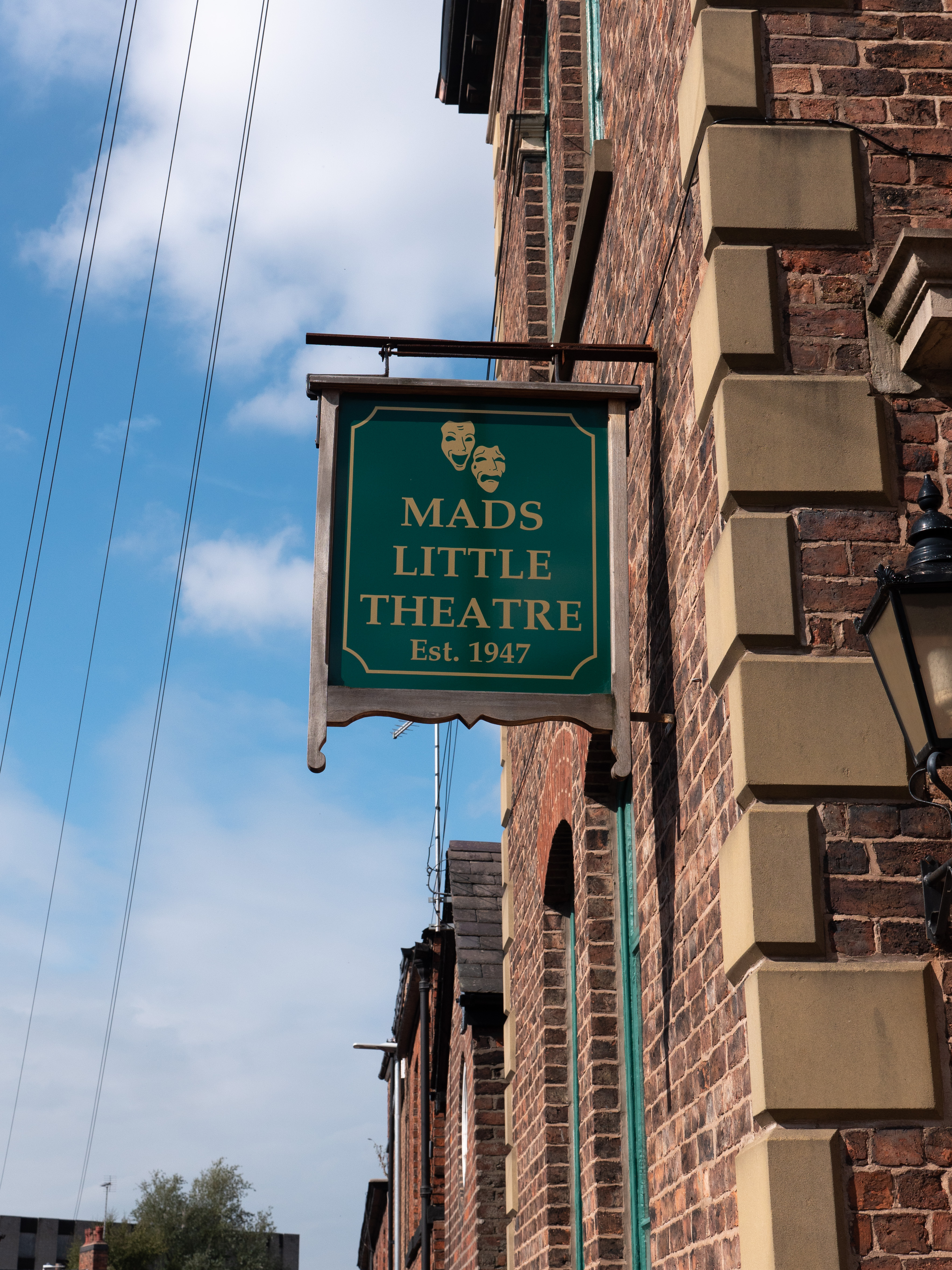
The Macclesfield Amateur Dramatic Society have performed at the Little Theatre on Lord Street since 1954.

Macclesfield has been accused of having few cultural amenities. In 2004, research was published in The Times naming Macclesfield and its borough the most uncultured town in Britain, based on its lack of theatres, cinemas and other cultural facilities.

The Northern Chamber Orchestra is the oldest professional chamber ensemble in the North West; its home is the Macclesfield Heritage Centre and presents a series of eight concerts a year, attracting international guest soloists. The Silk Opera Company was created to perform 'The Monkey Run' at Barnaby.

After recent rationalisation, the town now has one museum: the Silk Museum, on Park Lane, which includes paid access to Paradise Mill, a former silk mill. The Silk Museum houses the Ancient Egyptian artefacts brought back by Victorian antiquarian Marianne Brocklehurst and her partner Mary Booth: these were formerly held in West Park Museum, as well as a number of art galleries.

Macclesfield Chess Club is one of the oldest chess clubs in the country, having been founded in 1886.

The 'Macclesfield Literary and Philosophical Society' was formed in 2006, partly in response to The Times' 2004 article.

Local newspapers include the Macclesfield Express and the Community News. Macclesfield residents have access to Macclesfield Forum, an online Internet forum, for informal discussion of local news and issues. The town is also served by two locally based radio stations: Canalside Community Radio based at the Clarence Mill in Bollington, just north of Macclesfield, and Cheshire's Silk Radio, an independent commercial radio station with studios in the town. Local information websites include Visit Macclesfield and the local what's on guide, Canalside's The Thread.

The last remaining commercial cinema in Macclesfield closed in 1997. Discussions have taken place regarding the possibility of building a multiplex cinema, but attempts to build a cinema have thus far been unsuccessful. In 2005, a small-scale cinema, Cinemac, was set up in the Heritage Centre, which has since become well established; also based in the Heritage Centre is the Silk Screen arts cinema, which gives fortnightly screenings of art-house films.

Amateur dramatics is well represented in the town; the Macclesfield Amateur Dramatic Society has existed since 1947 and performs in its own theatre on Lord Street. The Macclesfield Majestic Theatre Group has been producing musicals since its inception in 1971, initially at the Majestic Theatre (hence the title), but latterly at various other locations after the theatre was converted into a public house by the new tenants. Most recently, shows have been produced at the Heritage Centre, the Evans Theatre in Wilmslow and MADS Theatre on Lord Street. Several members of this society have progressed to the professional stage, most notably Marshall Lancaster and Jonathan Morris.

Gawsworth Old Hall hosts an annual Shakespeare festival as well as many arts and music events throughout the year.

Macclesfield has appeared in film; it was used as the location for Edward Dmytryk' film So Well Remembered in 1947, starring John Mills. Some of the locations are still recognisable, such as Hibel Road. A fictionalised version of Macclesfield's railway station appeared in the 2005 football hooliganism film Green Street. It was also the location of Control (2007), a film about Ian Curtis, the lead vocalist of the rock band Joy Division.

The British blues singer John Mayall was born in the town in 1933. Macclesfield was also the home town of Ian Curtis and Stephen Morris of Joy Division, and Gillian Gilbert who, along with Morris, was a member of New Order. A memorial to Curtis is located at Macclesfield Crematorium. Other Macclesfield acts to have gained recognition include the Macc Lads and Marion.

Silk Brass Band, the Macclesfield-based brass band, won the National Championship of Great Britain Third Section Final in 2002. Having been promoted from the third section in 2002, they have since consistently competed in the Second, First and Championship sections of the UK's brass band grading system. Local band the Virginmarys has achieved national and international success.

In literature, Macclesfield is the second principal location of the fantasy novels The Weirdstone of Brisingamen (1960) and The Moon of Gomrath (1963) by Alan Garner.

In 2008, the borough was named as the fifth happiest of 273 districts in Britain by researchers from the universities of Sheffield and Manchester, who used information on self-reported personal well-being from the British Household Panel Survey.

== Media ==
Local news and television programmes are provided by BBC North West and ITV Granada. Television signals are received from the Winter Hill TV transmitter and the local relay transmitter situated south east of the town.

The town is served by both BBC Radio Manchester and BBC Radio Stoke. Other radio stations are Heart North West, Smooth North West, Capital Manchester and Lancashire and Greatest Hits Radio Manchester & The North West. Community based stations that broadcast from the town are Silk Radio and Canalside Radio.

Macclesfield Express is the town's local newspaper which publishes on Wednesdays.

== Education ==
Macclesfield is served by four state-funded academies (previously state high schools); Tytherington School, The Macclesfield Academy, Fallibroome Academy and All Hallows Catholic College.

There is also an independent school, Beech Hall School.

Macclesfield Academy is made up of pupils from the former school Henbury High School, and also took in the pupils left over when Ryles Park secondary school closed in 2004. Ryles Park had been in turn an amalgamation of Ryles Park girls school and the oldest state school in the town, Macclesfield Central boys school, which closed in 1975. It is on the site of Park Lane Special School and the former Macclesfield College as part of the Macclesfield 'Learning Zone', which was opened in 2007. Macclesfield High School was the name originally given to the girls grammar school on Fence Avenue which formed part of the King's School.

== Religion ==
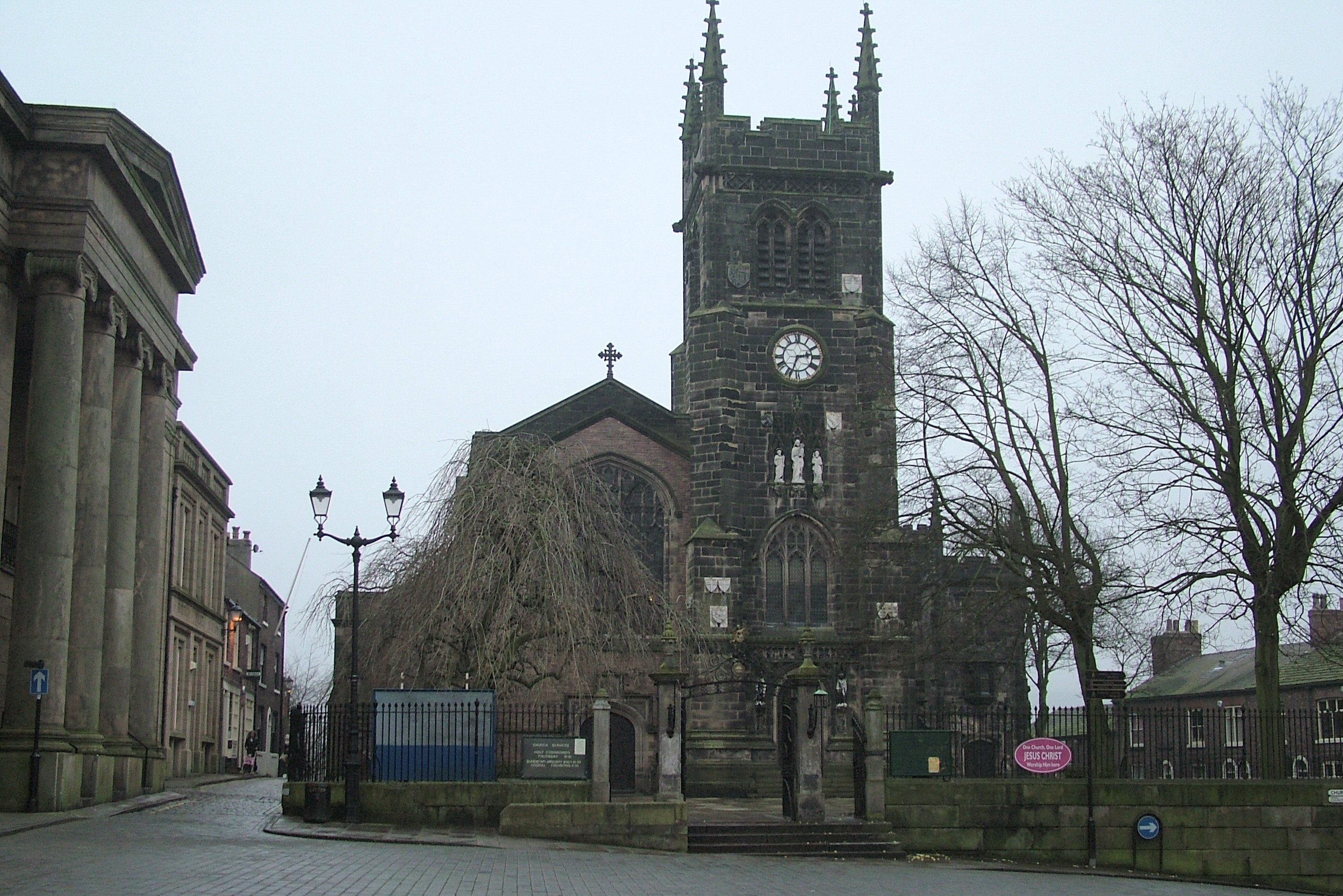
St Michael's Church, Macclesfield

The hilltop church of St Michael and All Angels has views of nearby Kerridge Hill. (Note: The apparently 15th-century St Michael's Church sandstone tower has carved panels with coats of arms: 1. Two chevrons and a canton (possibly Fitton); 2. A cross engrailed; 3. A cross engrailed charged with a mullet; : 4. A pale fusilly (possibly Nigel or Norton Augustinian Abbey, Cheshire, founded by Fitz-Nigel); 5. A cross ermine; 6. Quarterly, 1st and 4th a stag lodged, 2nd and 3rd a human leg couped at the thigh.) The church is approached from Waters Green by a flight of 108 steps, which themselves are a local landmark.

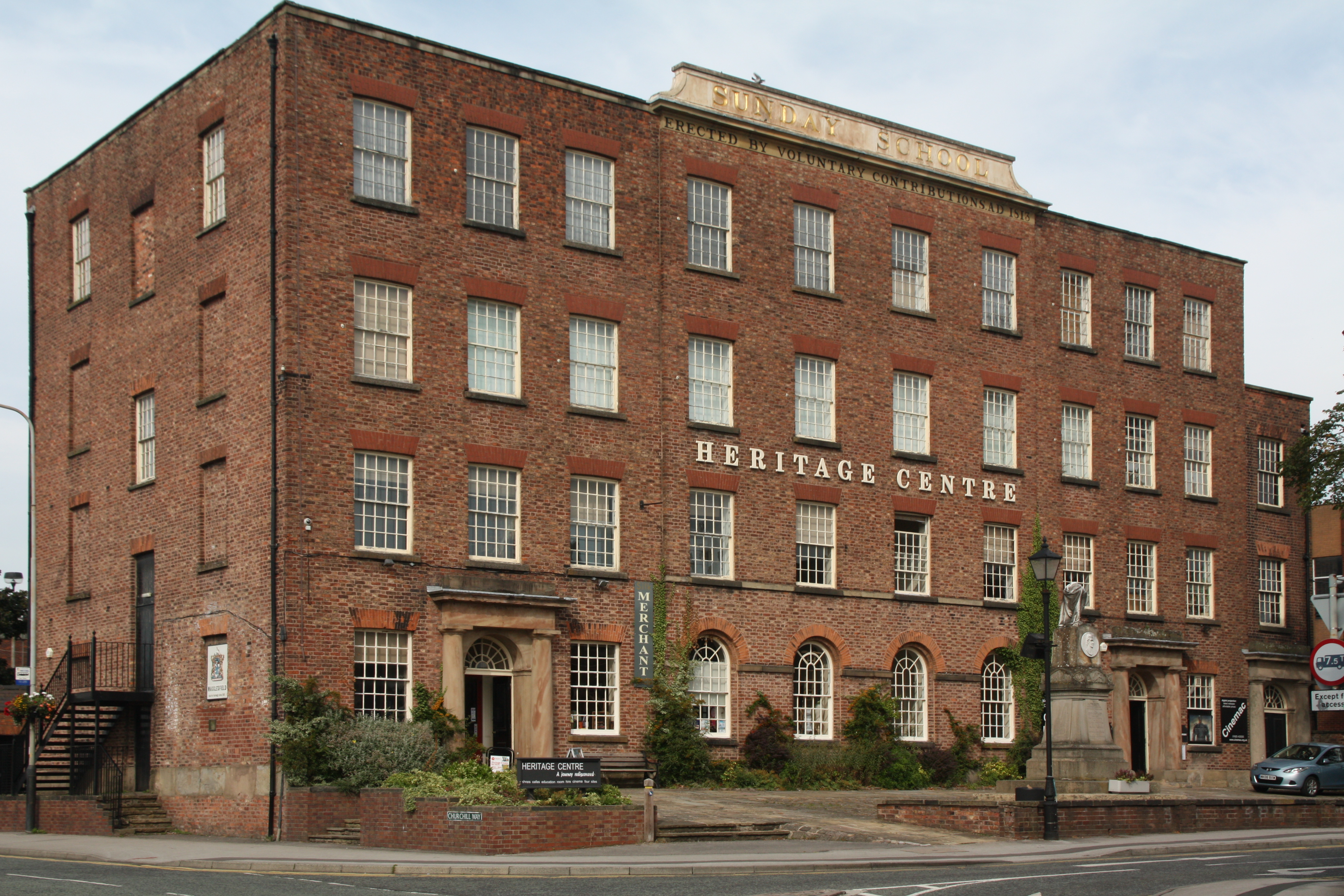
The Big Sunday School

Macclesfield Sunday School started in 1796 as a non-denominational Sunday School in Pickford Street, which catered for 40 children. It was founded by John Whitaker whose objective was "to lessen the sum of human wretchedness by diffusing religious knowledge and useful learning among the lower classes of society". Though chapels set up their denominational schools, the Sunday School committee in 1812 elected to erect a purpose-built school on Roe Street. The Big Sunday School had 1,127 boys and 1,324 girls on its books when it opened.

St Alban's Church in Chester Road is an active Roman Catholic parish church. The church is recorded in the National Heritage List for England as a designated Grade II* listed building. It was designed by A. W. N. Pugin.

Christ Church is a brick-built redundant Anglican church, located on Great King Street. It is recorded in the National Heritage List for England as a designated Grade II* listed building, and is under the care of the Churches Conservation Trust. The church was in use until 1981. It remains consecrated and is used occasionally for services.

An Ebenezer Chapel was established on Rainow Road in 1864. It is now a private residence.

There is a Latter-day Saint chapel located on Victoria Road.

There is a Kingdom Hall of Jehovah's Witnesses on Western Avenue.

Other churches of architectural merit include:

- King Edward Street Chapel, Macclesfield
- St George's Church, Macclesfield
- St Paul's Church, Macclesfield
- St Peter's Church, Macclesfield
- Holy Trinity Church, Hurdsfield
- Macclesfield United Reformed Church

== Sport and leisure ==
=== Football ===
Macclesfield's professional football club, Macclesfield Town, first gained league status in 1997 as Football Conference Champions; they had won that title two years earlier but were denied promotion as their Moss Rose stadium in the south of the town failed to meet Football League stadium capacity requirements. At the end of the 2019–20 season, the Silkmen were relegated from EFL League Two. In September 2020, Macclesfield Town Football Club was wound up in the High Court over debts totalling more than £500,000.

==== Macclesfield F.C. ====
On 13 October 2020, the official receiver confirmed that the assets of Macclesfield Town had been sold to Macc Football Club Limited. Local businessman Robert Smethurst had purchased the assets, and rebranded the club as Macclesfield F.C., they currently play in the National League North. They are known for beating Premier League side and Cup-holders Crystal Palace in the 3rd round of the 2025–26 FA Cup.

==== Other football clubs ====
Youth football teams include Macclesfield Juniors FC, Macclesfield Saints JFC, Moss Rose Juniors FC and Tytherington Juniors.

=== Other sports ===
Macclesfield RUFC, the town's rugby union club, plays in National League 1, following promotion from National League 2 North in the 2013–14 season.

Macclesfield Wheelers is a local cycling club for activities from pleasure riding to racing. World-famous cyclist Reg Harris produced his eponymous bikes in Macclesfield for three years during the 1960s. The local cycling campaign group is known as MaccBUG (Macclesfield Borough Bicycle Users Group). Formed in 1999, it campaigns for better cycling provision for leisure and utility cyclists.

Macclesfield Harriers & Athletic Club is an active club with over 500 members. The club caters for all abilities and ages. There are sections for road running, track & field, fell running and cross country.

Macclesfield Hockey Club is a community club with 8 senior teams and a thriving junior section. They cater for players of all abilities from the age of 5 upwards. At the first team level, the ladies play in the Regional North Leagues and the men in the North West Hockey Premier League.

In December 2006, Sport England published a survey which revealed that residents of Macclesfield were the third-most active in England in sports and other fitness activities; 29.3% of the population participate at least three times a week for 30 minutes.

Macclesfield parkrun, a free weekly timed 5k run, takes place in South Park every Saturday morning at 9.00 AM.

== Notable people ==
=== Politicians ===
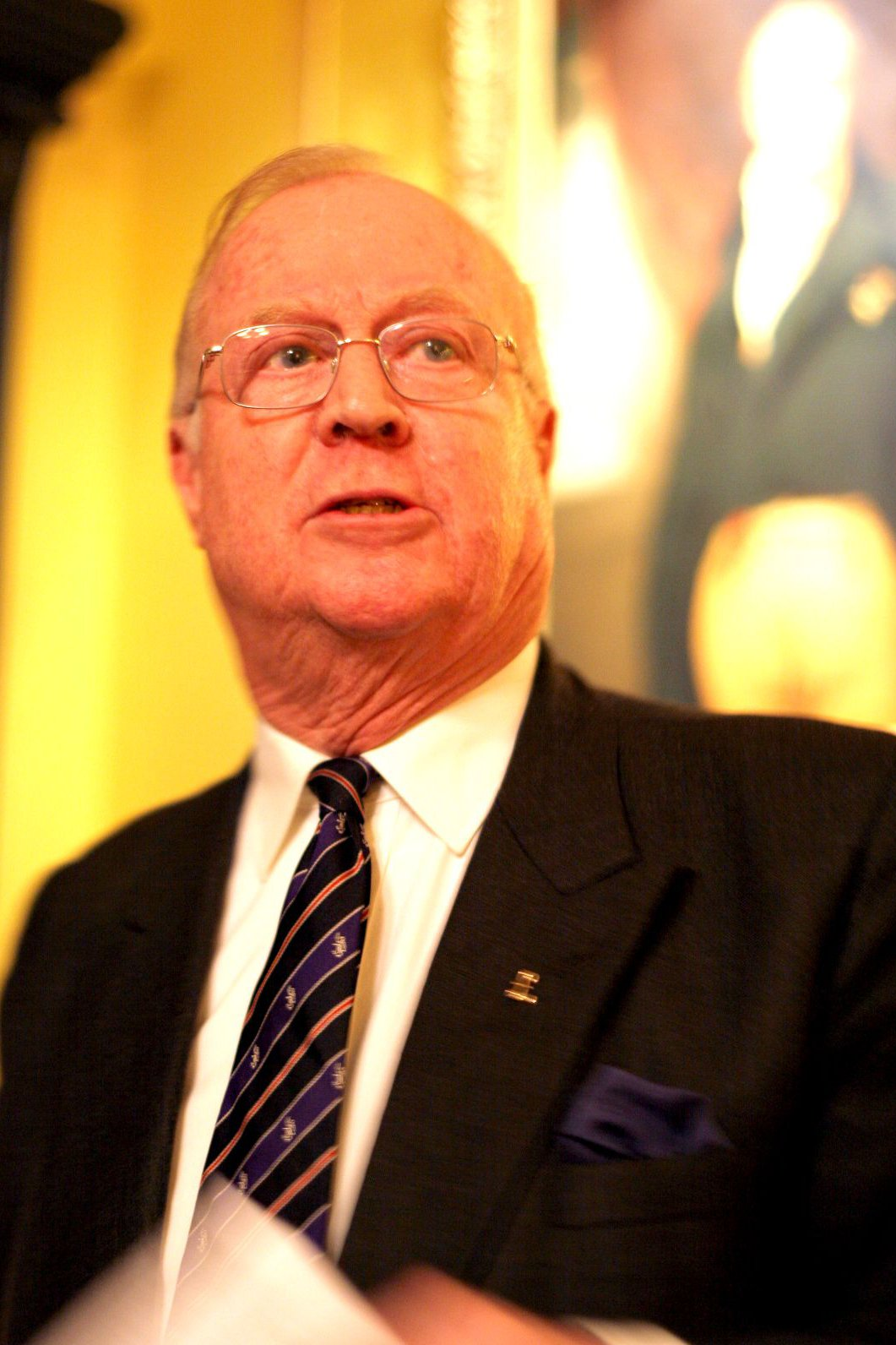
Nicholas Winterton, 2010

- John Brocklehurst, MP (1788–1870) Head of a family of silk producers, banker and MP for Macclesfield for 36 years, 1832 / 1868.
- William Coare Brocklehurst (1818–1900) Liberal Party politician. son of John and his successor as MP (1868–80). Unseated after a complaint of bribery during the 1880 election; his son was William (1851–1929), businessman and MP 1906 /1918.
- David Chadwick (1821–1895) English accountant and Liberal Party politician. One of two local MP's from 1868 to 1880 who were unseated and convicted of bribery and of making a false return of election expenses
- Sir Walter Bromley-Davenport (1903–1989) Conservative MP for Knutsford from 1945 until 1970
- Nicholas Winterton (born 1938), retired local MP, 1971 / 2010

=== Public service ===
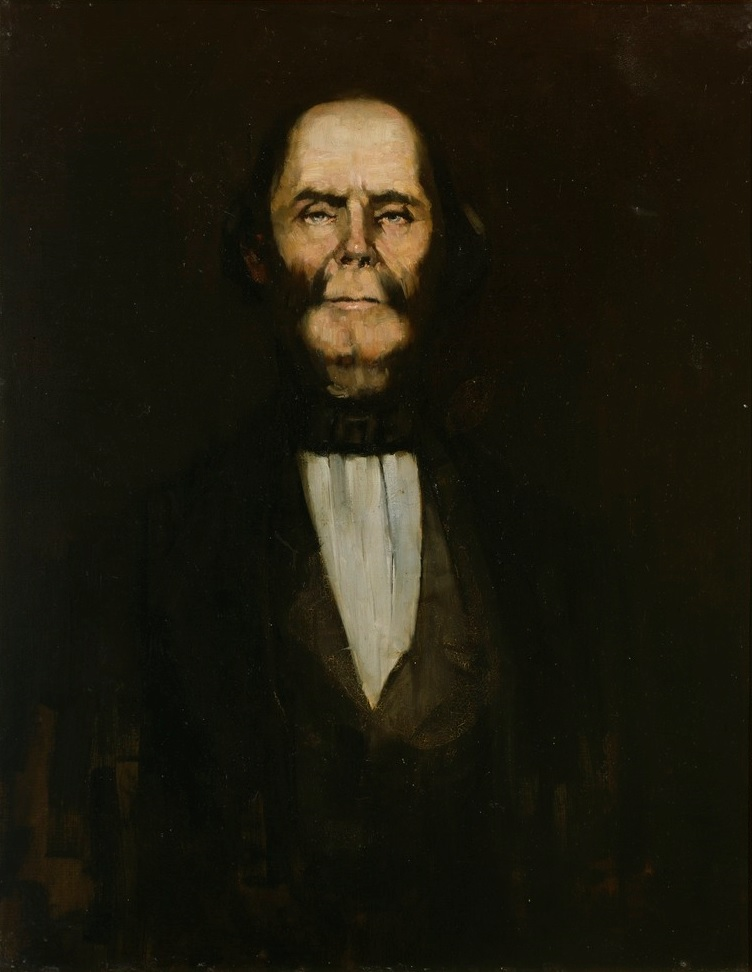
William Buckley

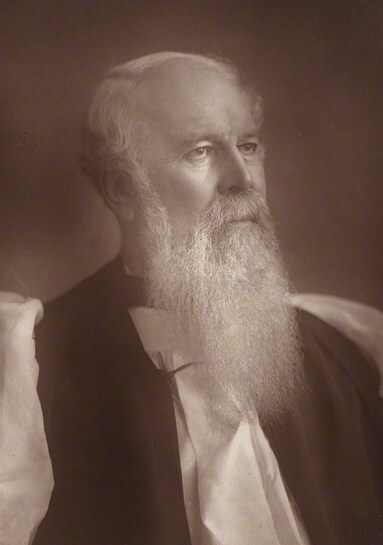
John Charles Ryle, 1888

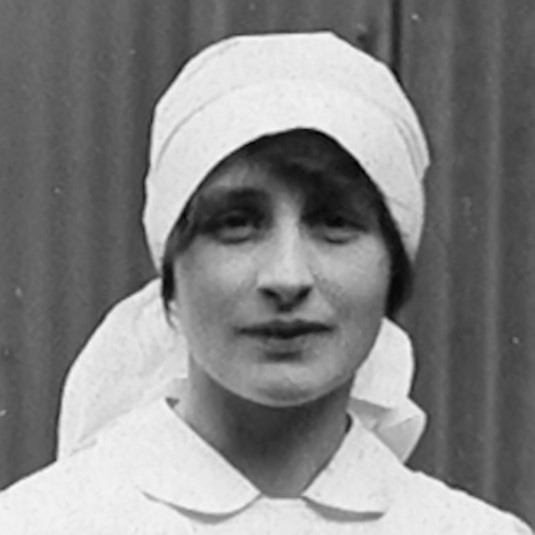
Vera Brittain, 1918

- John Shert (c.1544–1582) Catholic priest and martyr, executed in the reign of Elizabeth I, beatified 1889.
- Sir Edward Fitton (1548?–1606), MP who took part in the Elizabethan plantations of Ireland.
- Rev David Simpson (1745–1799) Anglican priest who spent most of his career in Macclesfield
- Edward Hawkins (1780–1867), numismatist and antiquary; Keeper of Antiquities at the British Museum.
- William Buckley, (1780–1856) escaped convict, survived among Australian aborigines between 1803 and 1835, raised here.
- John Charles Ryle (1816–1900) was the first Anglican Bishop of Liverpool
- Thomas Mottershead (c.1825 – 1884) British trade unionist and socialist activist
- Herbert Philips (c.1835–1905) philanthropist and justice of the peace
- Sir Samuel Rowe (1835–1888) doctor and colonial administrator of Sierra Leone, the Gambia and Gold Coast
- Arthur Smith Woodward, (1864–1944) palaeontologist specialised in fossil fish, born and educated here
- Richard Crosse (1888–1970) distinguished British Army officer
- Vera Brittain (1893–1970) nurse, feminist and pacifist, wrote Testament of Youth, lived locally as a child
- Edward Brittain (1895 in Macclesfield – 1918) British Army officer, fought and died in WW1 and was immortalised by his sister Vera Brittain in Testament of Youth
- Alec Stokes, (1919–2003) scientist worked on X-ray crystallography and DNA was born here.
- Mrs Justice Arbuthnot (born 1959), has served as a High Court judge for England and Wales since 2021.
- Christine Mary Tacon (born 1959) the United Kingdom's Groceries Code Adjudicator
- Tony Pollard (born 1965) archaeologist, specialising in the archaeology of conflict

=== Commerce ===
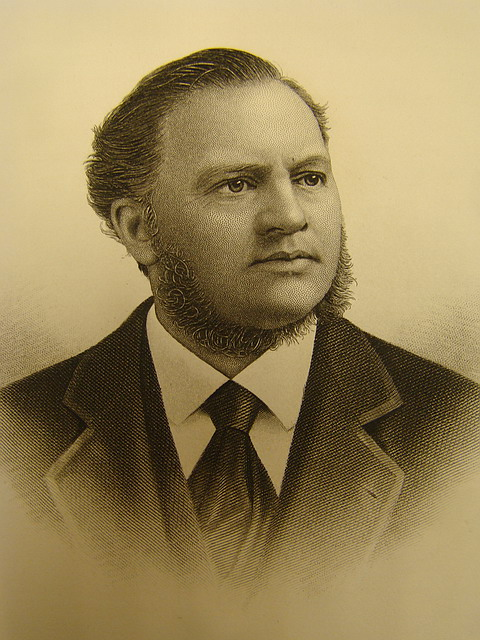
William Ryle II

- Charles Roe (1715–1781) industrialist, helped establish the silk industry in Macclesfield
- James Pigot (1769–1843) British publisher of directories, and a pioneering publisher of trade directories
- John Birchenough (1825–1895) silk manufacturer in the town and local politician
- Sir Thomas Wardle (1831–1909) businessman, known for his innovations in silk dyeing and printing on silk
- William Ryle II (1834–1881) silk manufacturer
- Sir John Henry Birchenough, 1st Baronet, (1853–1937) English businessman and public servant.
- Harold W. Whiston (1873–1952), businessman, magistrate, activist for vegetarianism and local Liberal.
- Peter Gaddum (1902–1986) was the sole provider of raw silk to the UK during much of World War II

=== The Arts ===
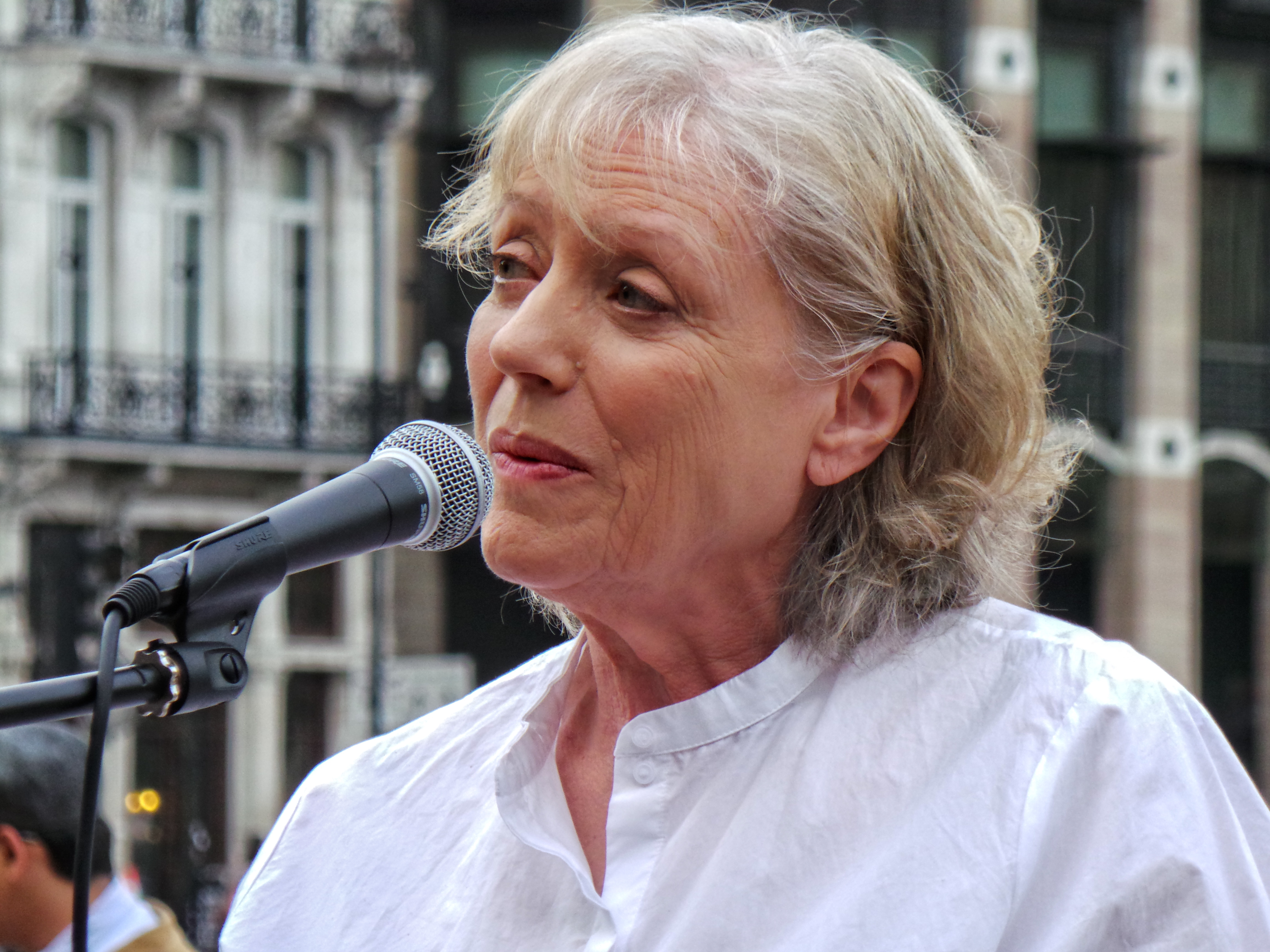
Kika Markham, 2014

- Alfred Gatley (1816–1863) was an English sculptor
- John William Wadsworth (1879–1955), ceramics designer for Mintons, born in Macclesfield
- Mabel Frances Layng (1881–1937) English landscape and figure painter
- Charles Tunnicliffe (1901 in Langley – 1979) naturalistic painter of British birds and other wildlife
- Kika Markham (born 1940) English actress, widow of Corin Redgrave
- Robert Longden (born 1951) composer, librettist, director, film, stage and television actor
- Mr Methane (born 1966 in Macclesfield) as Paul Oldfield, the world's only currently performing flatulist
- Dominic Brunt (born 1970) actor, played vet Paddy Kirk in ITV's Emmerdale
- Marshall Lancaster (born 1974) actor, played DC Chris Skelton in BBC dramas Life on Mars and Ashes to Ashes
- Sarah Burton (born 1974) fashion designer, creative director of fashion brand Alexander McQueen
- Helen Marten, (born 1985) sculptor who won the Turner Prize and the inaugural Hepworth Prize

=== Journalists and writers ===
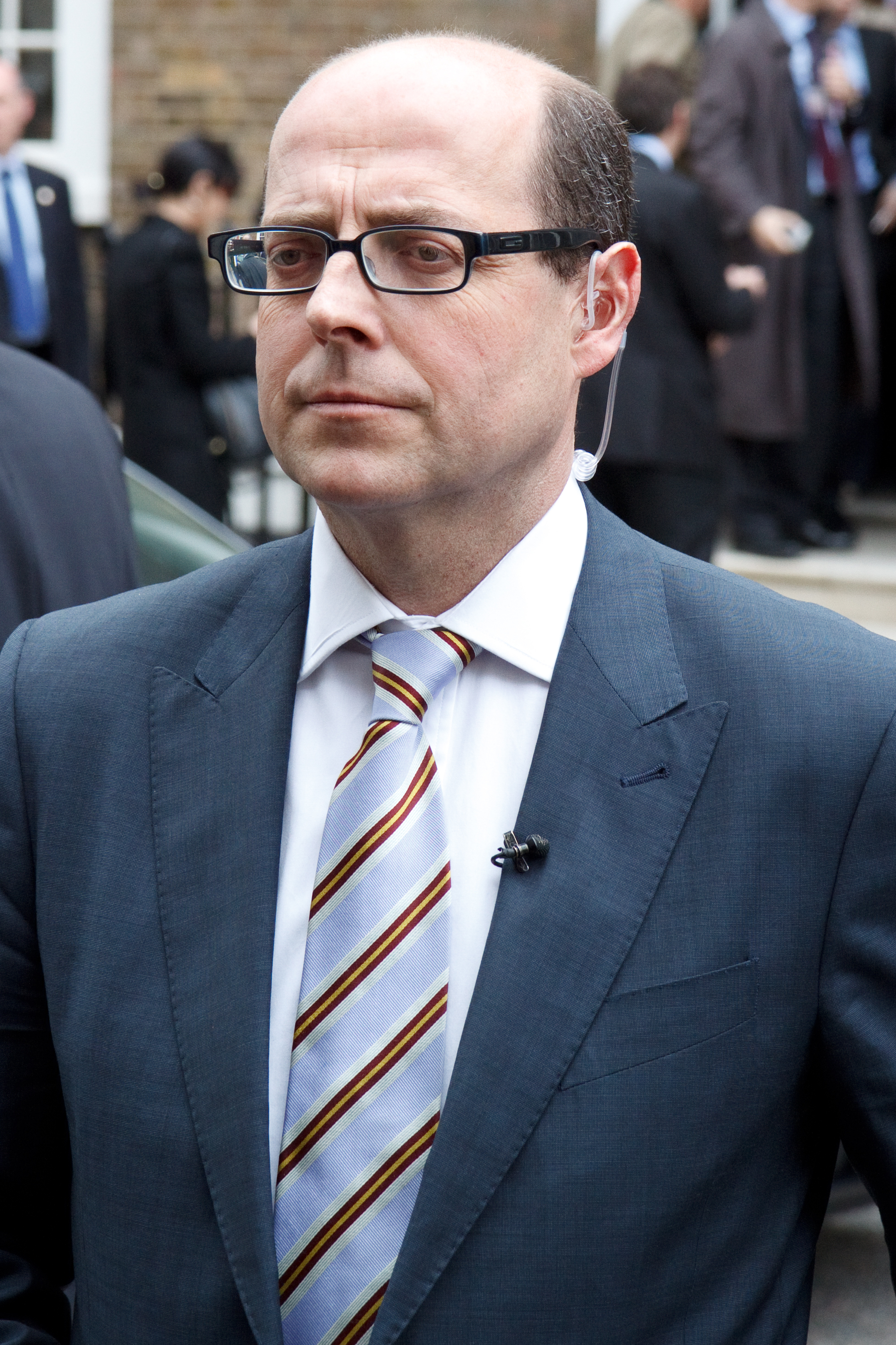
Nick Robinson, 2010

- Hester Rogers (1756–1794) British Methodist writer and role model for women Methodists
- Sui Sin Far (born Edith Maude Eaton; 1865–1914) author, wrote about Chinese people in North America
- Joseph McCabe, (1867–1955) rationalist writer and critic of religion, was born here
- Brian Redhead, (1929–1993) Manchester Guardian journalist and BBC Radio 4 Today anchorman, lived in the town
- Sir Andreas Whittam Smith, (1937-2025) financial journalist, founded and edited The Independent newspaper in 1986
- Michael Jackson (born 1958) television producer and executive, was Controller of both BBC One and BBC Two and Chief Executive of Channel 4, between 1997 and 2001
- Benedict Allen (born 1960) writer, explorer, traveller and filmmaker; immerses himself among indigenous peoples
- Peter Stanford (born 1961) writer, editor, journalist, presenter, known for biographies and writings on religion and ethics
- Nick Robinson, (born 1963) was political editor for the BBC, now presenter of the Today programme
- Stuart Evers (born 1976) novelist, short story writer and critic.

=== Music ===
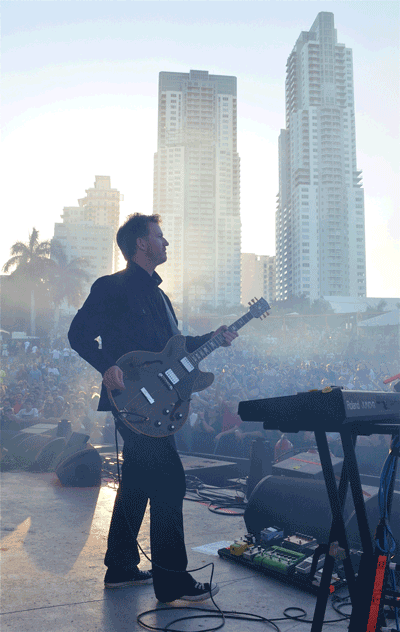
Phil Cunningham, New Order, 2012

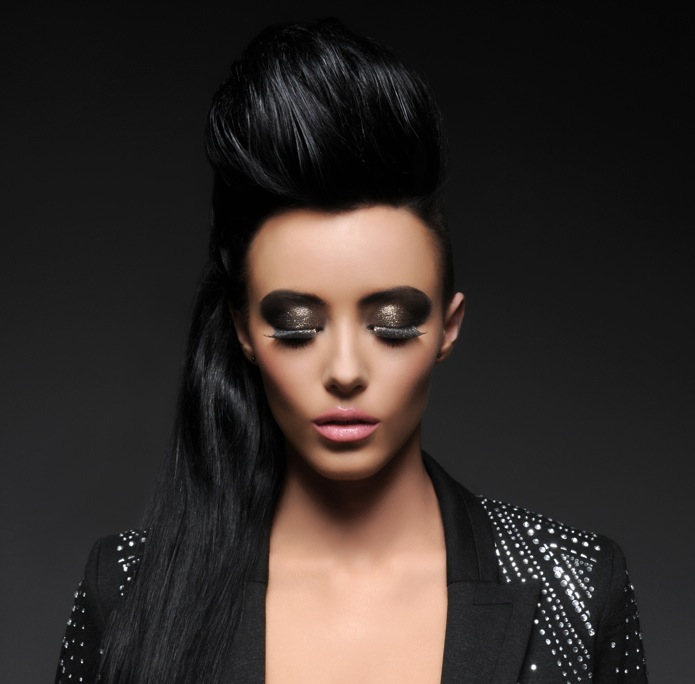
Hatty Keane, 2011

- Fanny Ayton (1806–1891), an English operatic soprano.
- Forbes Robinson (1926–1987) bass, known for his performances in works by Mozart, Verdi, and Britten.
- John Mayall (1933–2024) blues musician and bandleader, influential in the British blues movement
- Noddy Holder (born 1946) lead singer of Slade, lives in the town.
- Ian Curtis (1956–1980) lead singer of Joy Division, lived, died and buried locally.
- Stephen Morris (born 1957) drummer in the bands Joy Division, New Order, The Other Two & Bad Lieutenant
- Gillian Gilbert (born 1961) musician, keyboardist, guitarist, member of New Order and The Other Two
- Andy Carthy (born 1972) known by his stage name Mr. Scruff, record producer and DJ
- Phil Cunningham (born 1974) guitarist, member of the bands Marion, New Order and Bad Lieutenant
- Geoff Lloyd (born 1973) radio DJ, known as Geoff in Pete And Geoff; Hometime show on Absolute Radio.
- Jim Moray (born 1981) folk musician and singer, multi-instrumentalist and record producer.
- The Macc Lads (active 1981 – present) rock band, sing irreverent, foul-mouthed and politically incorrect lyrics
- The Other Two (active 1990–2011) dance act consisting of Stephen Morris and Gillian Gilbert of New Order
- Marion (formed in 1993) Brit-Pop band
- Hatty Keane (born 1994) R&B and pop singer
- The Virginmarys (formed in 2009) rock band.

=== Sport ===
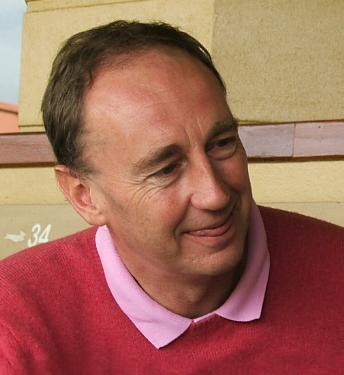
Jonathan Agnew, 2006

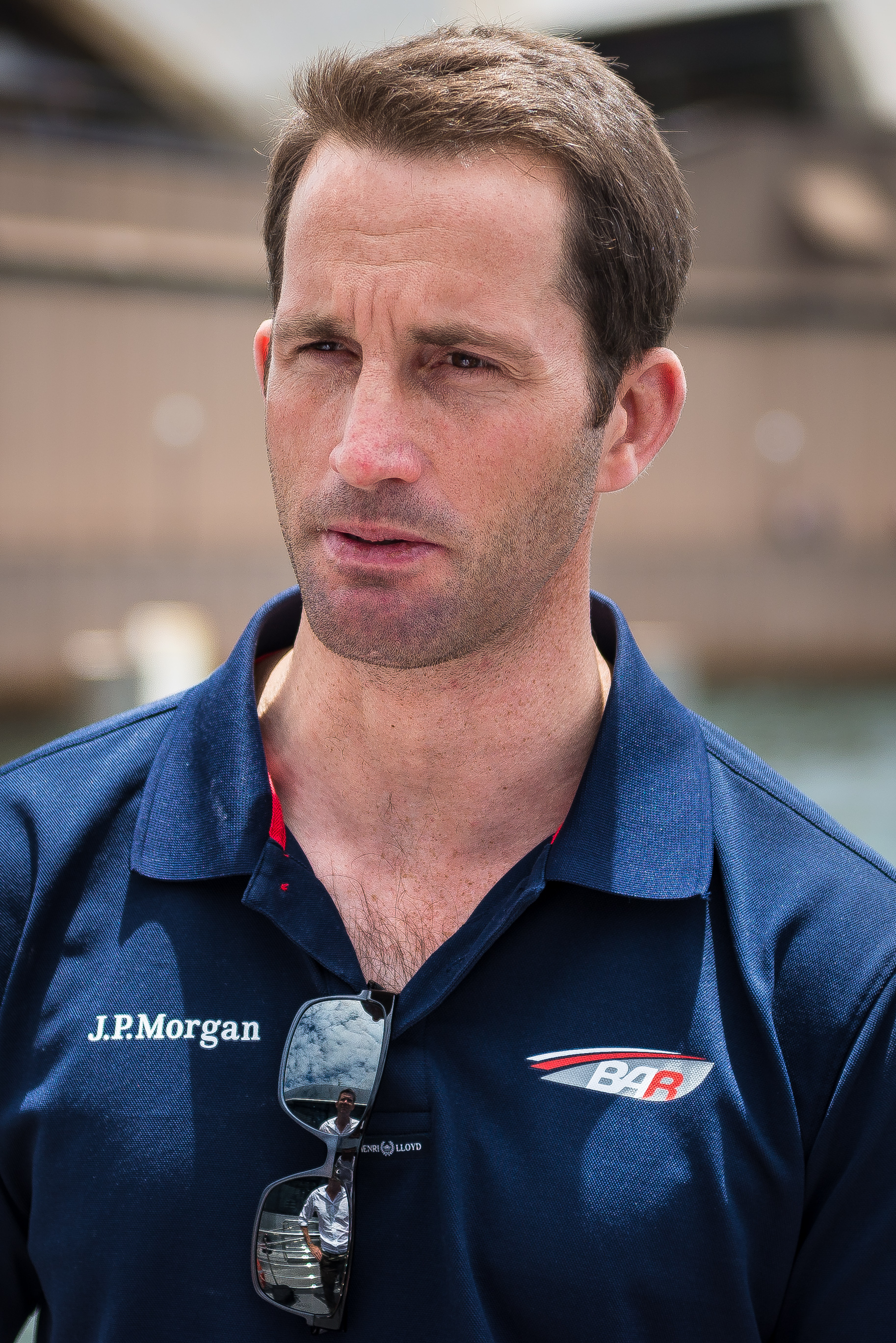
Sir Ben Ainslie, 2014

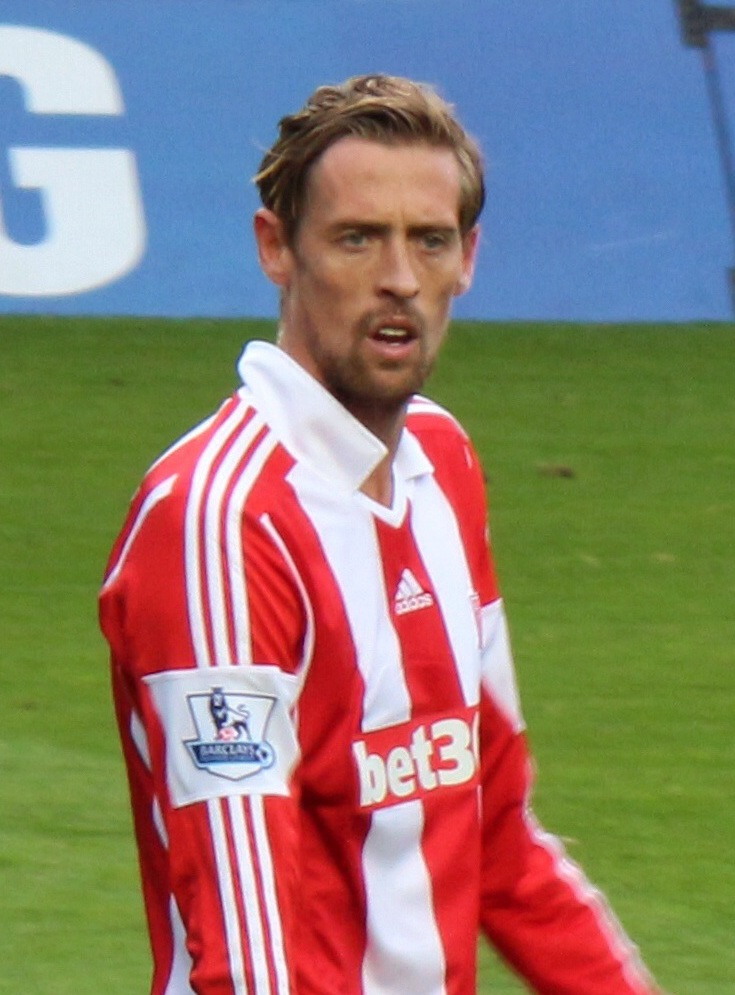
Peter Crouch, 2014

- Joseph Hawcridge (1863 in Macclesfield – 1905) a rugby union footballer
- Linton Hope (1863–1920) sailor, competed at the 1900 Summer Olympics in Meulan, France
- Charlie Twemlow (1901–1976), an English footballer who played 166 games for Macclesfield Town F.C.
- Reg Harris (1920–1992) track cyclist, active in the 1940s, 1950s and 1970s, died locally
- Guy Edwards (born 1942 in Macclesfield) Formula One driver, 1974-1977
- Bobbie van de Graaf (born 1944 in Macclesfield) retired Dutch rower, bronze medalist in the 1964 Summer Olympics
- Alf Wood (1945 – 2020), an English footballer who played 488 games
- Chris Nicholl (1946-2024) former N.Ireland footballer, played 706 games and 51 for NI, coach and manager
- Jonathan Agnew (born 1960) cricketer and cricket commentator, known as "Aggers"
- Peter Moores (born 1962) former England Cricket Coach, born and schooled in Macclesfield.
- Matthew Fleming (born 1964), former British Army officer and cricketer; President of the MCC from 2016 to 2017.
- Paul Thorp (born 1964), former rider with Great Britain national speedway team with 31 caps
- Stuart Brown (born 1972) thirteen-time British National Sidecarcross Champion.
- Steven Mellor (born 1973) swimmer, competed in the 1992 Olympic Games in Barcelona
- Jamie Donaldson (born 1975) golfer, born in and plays for Wales, was raised and currently lives in the town
- Ben Ainslie (born 1977) silver and gold medal-winning yachtsman at the 1996 & 2000 Summer Olympics,
- Peter Crouch (born 1981) footballer, played 599 games including 225 for Stoke City F.C. and 42 for England
- Chris Holroyd (born 1986), footballer, played over 430 games, including 140 with Macclesfield Town F.C.
- Vicky Jepson (born 1987), association football manager
- Gareth Evans (born 1988), footballer who has played over 450 games, including 82 for Macclesfield Town F.C.
- Luke Murphy (born 1989), footballer who has played over 480 games, including 55 for Macclesfield Town F.C.
- Ben Amos (born 1990), football goalkeeper, played over 300 games
- Shaun Brisley (born 1990), footballer, played over 400 games, starting with 124 for Macclesfield Town F.C.
- Izzy Christiansen (born 1991) English women footballer, played over 130 games and 31 for England women
- Matthew Nottingham (born 1992) badminton player
- Karriss Artingstall (born 1994), female featherweight boxer, bronze medallist at the 2020 Summer Olympics
- Emily Whitlock (born 1994) a professional squash player, world No. 12 in 2017.
- Joseph Loake (born 2005) racing driver

== Twin towns ==
Macclesfield has no twin towns. Until 2010, Macclesfield had an informal bond with Eckernförde in Germany in the aftermath of World War II when the townsfolk sent aid to Eckernförde.

== Freedom of the Town ==
The following people and military units have received the Freedom of the Town of Macclesfield.

=== Individuals ===
- Sir Geo Jeffreys: 1682.
- John Askey: 9 August 2018.

=== Military regiments ===
- 4th Battalion The Cheshire Regiment: 1902.

== See also ==
- Listed buildings in Macclesfield
- Cat and Fiddle Road
- Macclesfield Castle
- List of textile mills in Cheshire
- Duke's Court (Macclesfield)
- Macclesfield group power stations
