= The Macclesfield Academy =

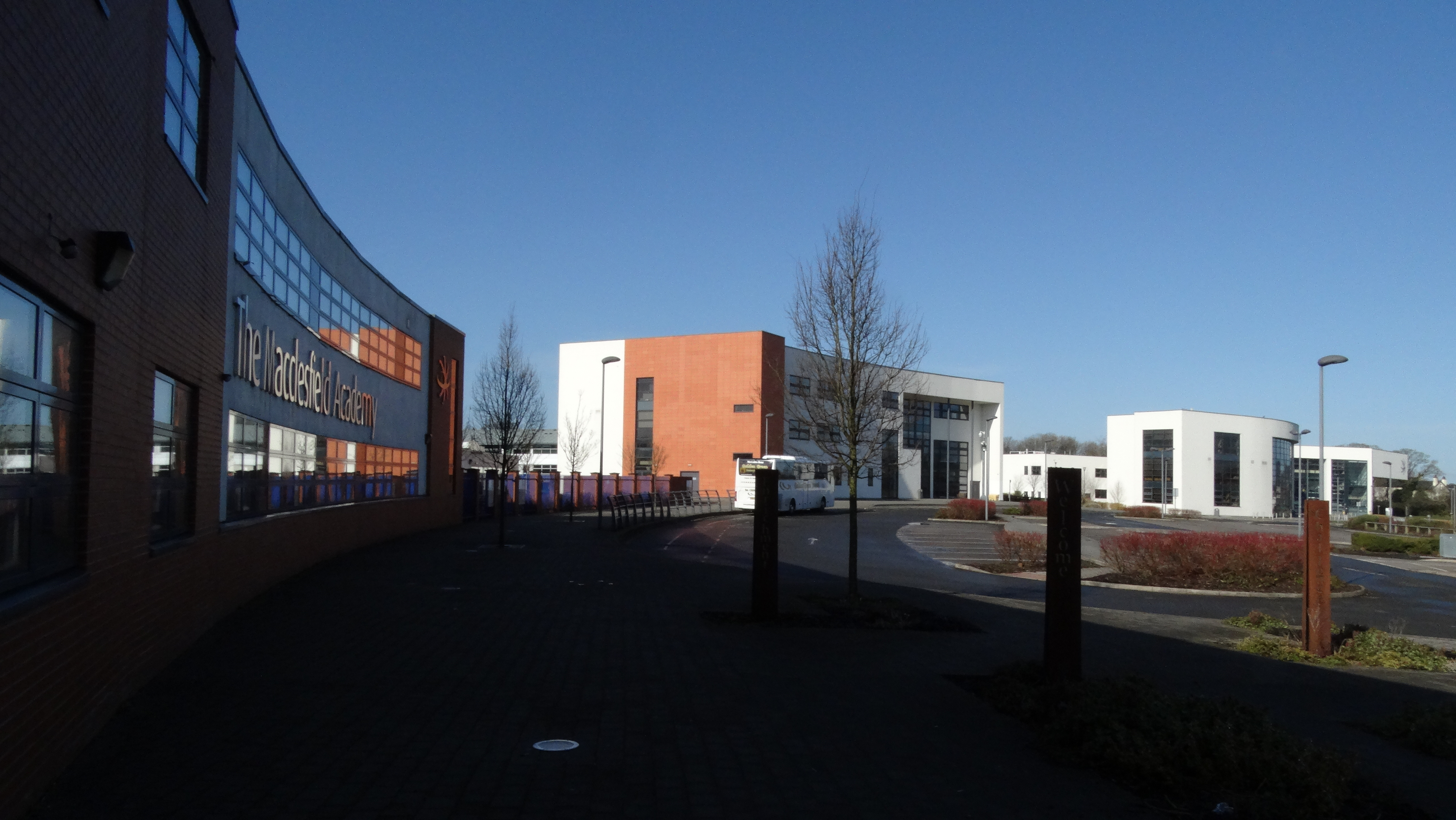
- Macclesfield Academy and Macclesfield College (2018)

Location
- Park Lane; Macclesfield, Cheshire, SK11 8JR; England; 53°15′05″N 2°08′09″W

Information
- Type: Academy
- Established: 1 September 2011
- Local authority: Cheshire East
- Department for Education URN: 137064 Tables
- Ofsted: Reports
- Interim Headteacher: Mrs Sarah du Plessis
- Gender: Coeducational
- Age: 11 to 16
- Houses: Silk, Mulberry & Hovis
- Colour: Navy Blue
- Website: http://www.macclesfieldacademy.org/

Macclesfield Academy is an Academy situated in Macclesfield, Cheshire.

The Academy opened on 1 September 2011 following the decision of Cheshire East Council to close Macclesfield High School which had previously operated on the same site. It is built on the Macclesfield Learning Zone campus, sharing it with Park Lane Special School, the former Macclesfield College and various other facilities. The Academy has approximately 50 teachers and 30 support staff who together serve a population of about 650 students.

== Ofsted ==
As of 2021, the school's most recent inspection by Ofsted was in 2020, with a judgement of Requires Improvement.
