= Duke's Court (Macclesfield) =

Secluded part of Macclesfield with independent shops

Duke's Court is a secluded part of Macclesfield town centre incorporating independent shops, bars and restaurants.

The Courtyard was renovated in the early 1990s and has numbered small bookshops, dressmakers, florists, hat shops, hairdressers and travel agents among its residents.

It is becoming a popular location for eating out in Macclesfield.

Duke's Court is open at both ends with access to Mill Street and Duke's Street.

In 2007–2008 Duke's Court was under threat from the planned regeneration of Macclesfield which would have seen the area demolished to make way for a replacement location for TJ Hughes. This was opposed by local businesses, and when the plans were submitted in November 2008, demolition of Duke's Court was not included.
