= Macclesfield College =

College in Cheshire

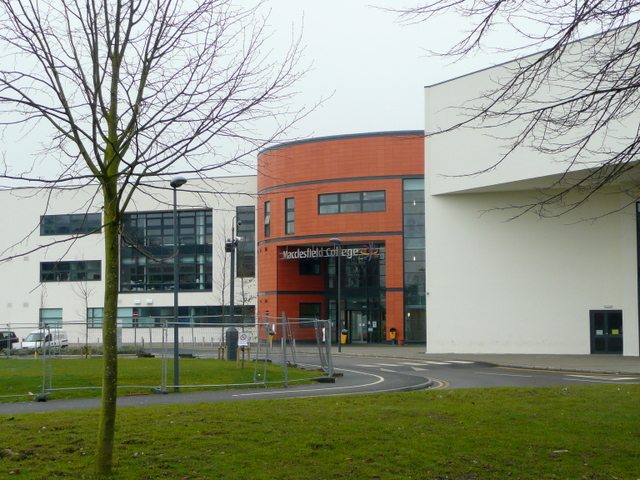
- Macclesfield College in 2009
- Location: Macclesfield, England; 53.251°N 2.138°W

Macclesfield College is a further education campus in Macclesfield, Cheshire and forms part of Cheshire College – South & West. It offers a range of further education provision, including vocational and technical courses, T Levels, apprenticeships and adult education.

The campus is situated just off Park Lane, alongside other establishments including The Macclesfield Academy, Park Lane School and Macclesfield Tennis Club.

In March 2026, it was announced that Macclesfield College and Cheshire College – South & West planned to merge.

The merger was completed in August 2026, with Macclesfield College becoming part of Cheshire College – South & West. The Macclesfield campus remains open, alongside the College's campuses in Crewe, Ellesmere Port and Chester.
