= Arighi Bianchi =

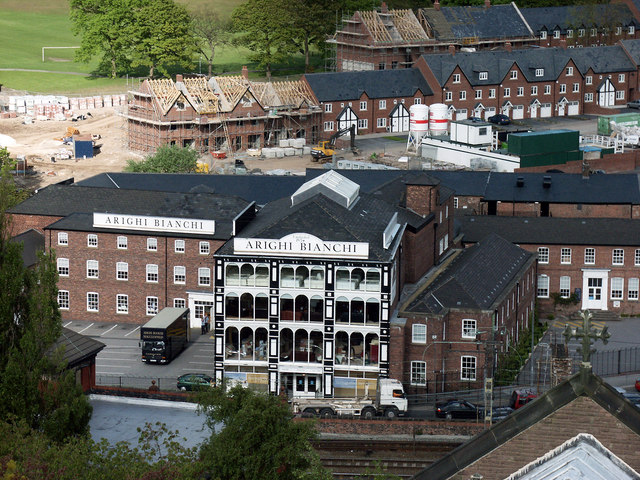
- Arighi Bianchi

- Location in Cheshire
- 53.2608°N 2.1218°W
- Location: Macclesfield, Cheshire, England
- OS grid reference: SJ 920 738

History
- Founded: 1854
- Built for: Antonio Arighi, Antonio Bianchi

Listed Building – Grade II*
- Official name: Showroom premises of Messrs Arighi Bianchi
- Designated: 18 September 1973
- Reference no.: 1291854

Arighi Bianchi is a furniture shop in Macclesfield, Cheshire, England, founded in 1854 by Italian immigrants Antonio Arighi and Antonio Bianchi who originated from the village of Casnate on the shores of Lake Como.

The shop is a Grade II* listed building. It has a cast iron and glass frontage, and stands close to Macclesfield railway station. The four-storey shop front, inspired by Paxton’s Crystal Palace of 1851, was the work of a local builder George Roylance. It was saved from demolition in 1973 after a campaign supported by the Victorian Society, the Architectural Review magazine and John Betjeman.

== History ==
Arighi Bianchi (pronounced a-ree-ghee bee-an-key) has been involved with furniture for over 150 years. In 1854 Antonio Arighi left the tiny silk-weaving town of Casnate near Lake Como to escape the ravages of the Italian civil war. After crossing the Alps by toboggan, Antonio arrived in Macclesfield, Cheshire. Antonio was soon joined by his nephew Antonio Bianchi, and the two men swiftly set up in business as cabinet makers.

The 19th century progressed not without incident, with Arighi's intervention helping to save the town from flooding in 1872 and the decision to move to the current site in 1883. In the early 20th century, the store supplied furniture to Marlborough House and Sandringham House, by Royal Appointment of Edward VII, Queen Alexandra and Queen Mary.

== See also ==
- Grade II* listed buildings in Cheshire East
- Listed buildings in Macclesfield
