= Bridge Street drill hall =

Drill hall in Macclesfield, Cheshire, England

- Macclesfield
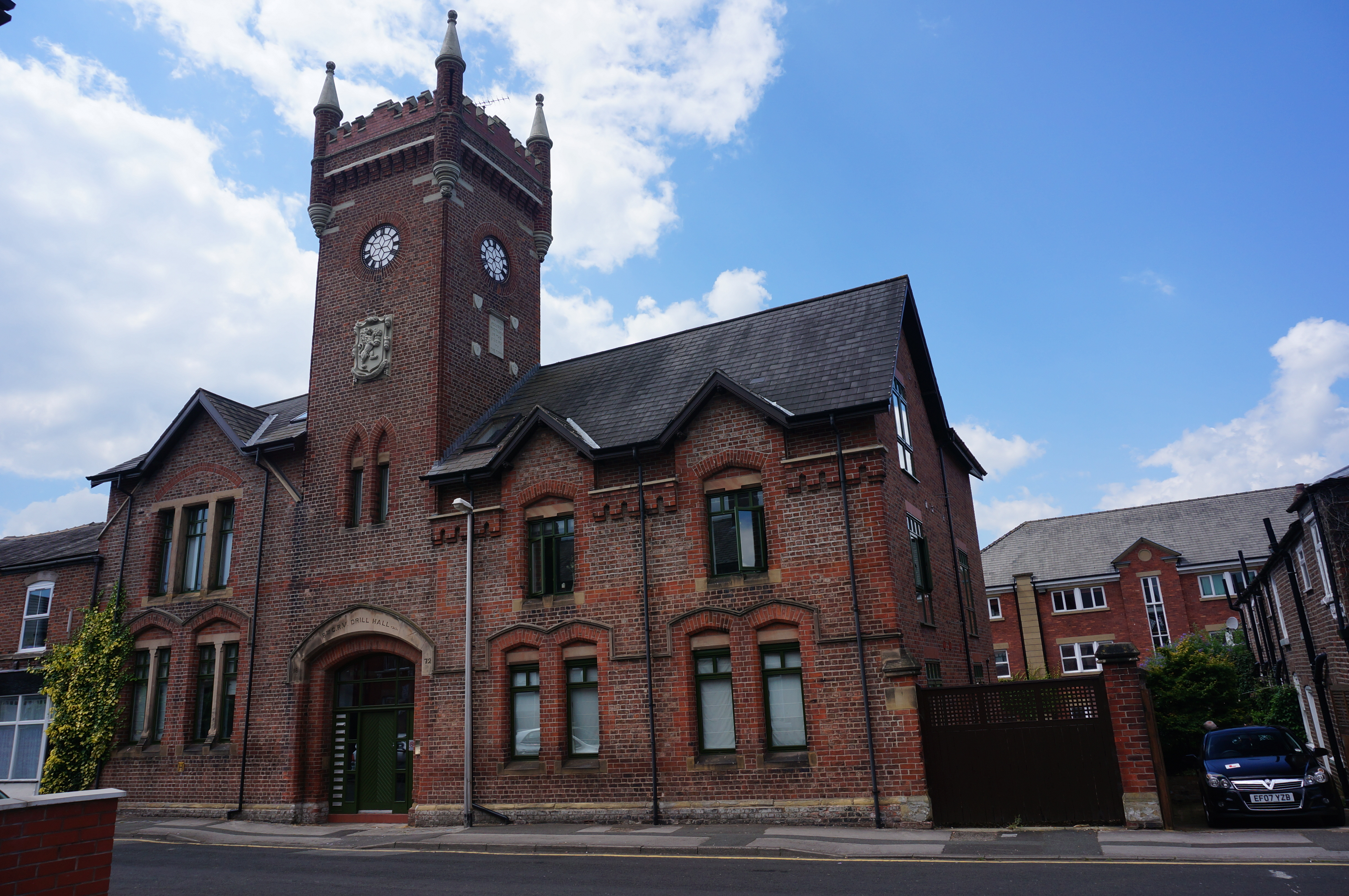
- Bridge Street drill hall

Site information
- Type: Drill hall

Location
- Location in Cheshire
- Coordinates: 53.26054°N 2.13150°W

Site history
- Built: 1871
- Built for: War Office
- In use: 1871 – 1990

The Bridge Street drill hall is a former military installation in Macclesfield, Cheshire.

== History ==
The building was designed as the headquarters of the 8th Cheshire Rifle Volunteers and opened in 1871. This unit evolved to become the 5th Volunteer Battalion, The Cheshire Regiment in 1883 and the 7th Battalion, The Cheshire Regiment in 1908. The battalion was mobilised at the drill hall in August 1914 before being deployed to Gallipoli and ultimately to the Western Front. The battalion amalgamated with the 4th Battalion to form the 4th/7th Battalion in 1967. The presence at the drill hall was reduced to a single company, B Company, 3rd (Volunteer) Battalion, The Cheshire Regiment, in 1988. B Company moved to new premises at Ypres Barracks in Chester Road in 1990 and the Bridge Street drill hall was decommissioned and has since been converted into apartments.
