= Peter Gaddum =

Expert in silk production

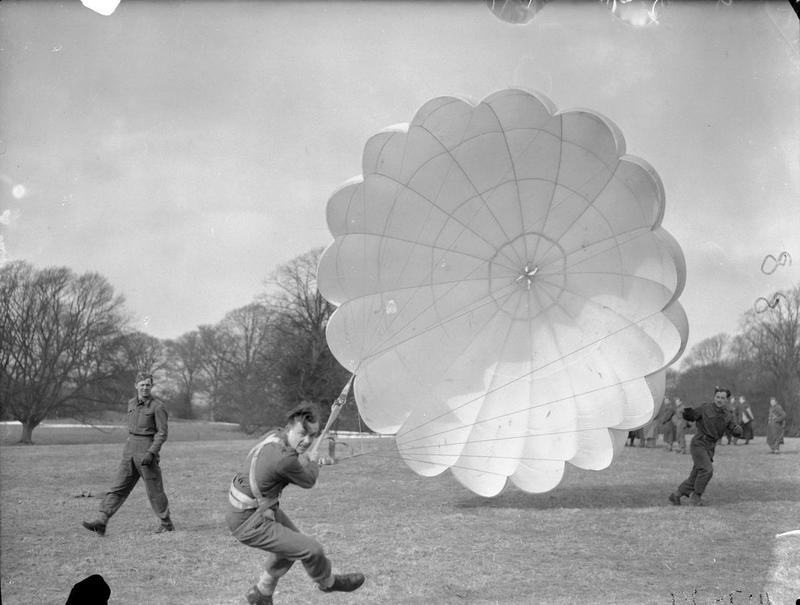
Parachute training for soldiers in Britain 1940s

Peter William Gaddum (1902–1986) from Bowdon, Greater Manchester, in England was the sole provider of raw silk to the UK during much of World War II.

== Career ==
After Japan entered the war in 1941, supplies from all usual sources (in China, Japan, France and Italy) were in enemy hands. Silk was needed for making parachutes. Nylon had recently been commercialised in the USA but was in very short supply in the UK.

Before the war, Gaddum worked for the family firm H.T. Gaddum. The Gaddum family had been trading in textiles since 1826. During the war he was in the army but moved to become Chief Assistant in the Ministry of Supply, responsible for the supply and control of silk and rayon. In order to develop new supplies of silk to the UK, Gaddum embarked on a treacherous journey in 1941 to the Middle East via Ireland and Africa. He travelled up the Congo and down the Nile to Cairo in Egypt and onto Beirut in the Lebanon. He spent two years travelling around the Middle East, Cyprus, Turkey and India sourcing high-grade raw silk to be reeled in Lebanon, as a reliable supply for the UK war demands.

After the war, Gaddum was given the task of reestablishing the silk trade with the Far East. He wrote a definitive guide to sericulture in 1948, entitled Silk: How and Where it is Produced which sold worldwide. Gaddum handed over the records of the Silk Association of Great Britain and Ireland to the Manchester Central Library in 1974. The family is still involved in the silk and textile industry. Gaddum & Gaddum Ltd. was founded in 2006, operating in Leek, Staffordshire.

== See also ==
- Silk industry of Cheshire
- List of textile mills in Cheshire
