= John F. Leeming =

English entrepreneur, businessman, aviator, gardener and author

John Fishwick Leeming (8 January 1896 – 3 July 1965) was an English entrepreneur, businessman, early aviator, co-founder of the Lancashire Aero Club, gardener and author.

== Early life and family ==
John was born in Chorlton Lancashire in 1896, the youngest son of Henry and Edith Leeming. He had an older brother Henry (born 1886) and sister Jessie (born 1888). The 1901 census records the family living in 7 Demesne Road, Withington, together with Lucy Clifton (governess) and Florence Clark (servant, domestic). John's father Henry was an employer in a Silk & Cotton Manufacturing & Oil Merchant business together with his older brother John H Leeming. Leeming was sent to a preparatory school in Southport, and sold his first published article at 13, and later became internationally known for his books, which sold in large numbers. Whilst at school he first saw the pioneering efforts of powered flying at Birkdale near Southport. In 1910 when Leeming was 15 years he made his first glider and tried it on the sands there. The family moved to Hale in 1915 and in 1923 were living at Alderbank, 40 Ashley Road, Altrincham. In the spring of 1918 Leeming (now 23 years) married Gladys Birch and they lived first at 38 Albert Road from 1920 to 1923 and later 23 Spring Road, Hale. They had two children David and John. The latter was involved in the Downside Abbey Air Crash of 15 May 1943.

== Aviation interests ==
With the upsurge of aviation during the First World War, Leeming built his next glider in 1921 in his parents' cellar, later moved to their garage at Bowdon Cheshire (now Greater Manchester), as it got bigger, then the greenhouse. In 1924 he flew his fifth glider which he had built from scrap from A.V.Roe & Co at their Woodford Airfield, with friends Tom Prince and Clement Wood and known as an LPW' after their initials. All his later gliders could be dismantled and stored in a garage. He crashed the glider and rebuilt it with a Douglas motorbike engine installed but it was too heavy to fly and they could only trundle around the field. The aircraft was based at Alexandra Park Aerodrome just outside Manchester City Centre from early 1924 until 1925 when the group moved to Woodford Aerodrome on invitation from the Avro Aircraft Company.

=== The Lancashire Aero Club ===
Leeming and nine friends formed the Lancashire Aero Club in his greenhouse, the first aero club in Britain with Leeming as first chairman and later president. In that same year 1924, the glider was completed and taken to Alexandra Park Aerodrome Manchester where it was tow-launched into the air behind a high-powered car, frequently being damaged and repaired during its exploits. When Alexandra Park Aerodrome closed in August 1924, the club was invited to move to Avro's Woodford airfield. The club is the largest and oldest surviving aero club in Britain. Manchester Corporation opened a new airport at Barton in 1930. In July the same year Miss Winifred Brown of the Lancashire Aero Club won the prestigious King's Cup Air Race in Hanworth, West of London, despite tough opposition from numerous famous pilots, flying the very latest aircraft, in front of a 30,000 crowd. World War II stopped club activities, and in September 1939, the club's aircraft were stored in Avro's hangars at Woodford. The club restarted at Barton in 1946.

=== Landing on a mountain ===
Leeming had become famous for landing on the Chester Road near The Swan Inn in the 1920s to refuel at a petrol station and for a planned landing on the second highest mountain in England. In 1926 John Leeming, chairman of Lancashire aero club and Bert Hinkler (1892–1933), the Australian chief test pilot of A.V.Roe Avro Manchester, two daring airmen decided to lift the nation's spirits by being the first aircraft to land on a mountain in Great Britain. They chose to land on Helvellyn in the English Lake District, which is 3,117 feet above sea level. They set off in his Avro Avian 585 two-seater biplane on 22 December. They managed to land on the stony plateau which tops the fell, witnessed by a fell walker who was visiting the area. An academic, E.R. Dodds (1893–1979), Professor of Greek at the University of Birmingham, recorded the event, signing an old bill (receipt) to that effect, before they took off again. It was quite some feat. The plane had only a 30 yard run-up to the rim overlooking Red Tarn (a lake), as they flew back to Woodford, some 90 miles away south of Manchester. Today the event is marked by a slate which reads: "The first aeroplane to land on a mountain in Great Britain did so on this spot. On December 22nd 1926 John Leeming and Bert Hinkler in an AVRO 585 Gosport landed here and after a short stay flew back to Woodford".

=== Northern Air Lines (Manchester) Ltd ===
In 1928 he co-founded Northern Air Lines (Manchester) Ltd together with Mr. F. J. V. Holmes, acting as managers for the Manchester Corporation. They operated charter and pleasure flights from Manchester's early airfield at Barton, who based several Avro 504s and other types for training, club and charter flights. They had a two-seater De Havilland DH.60 Moths available for charter at one shilling per mile. Leeming was good at securing publicity for his airline, as Flight magazine reported frequently at the time:

"Northern Airlines, Ltd., have recently acquired a D.H.50A, to carry four passengers and pilot, for use in connection with their air taxi work from Barton Aerodrome, Manchester. This machine was christened The Lancastrian by Alderman Davy, chairman of the Manchester Aerodrome Special Committee, on November 13, and is their first "enclosed " machine. Northern Air Lines are carrying out a considerable amount of air taxi work, and their rates are about the cheapest of any in the country for passenger transport, working out at 6d. per mile per person."
" ... negotiations are in progress between Imperial Airways and the Northern Air Transport Company of Manchester, for the inauguration of a passenger air service between London and Manchester. It is proposed to connect up at Croydon with the Imperial Airways ..."
"Mr. John Leeming, of Northern Air Lines, Ltd., has, together with Mr. M. Morgan, a motor engineer of the Ford Motor Co., invented this new flying instructor, which will be marketed at £25. It has proved a considerable ..."

Between 1926 and 1928, Leeming, using his good contacts with Sir Sefton Brancker (U.K. Director of Civil Aviation), the Royal Aero Club and the city leaders, orchestrated an eventually successful campaign for Manchester to construct the UK's first municipal aerodrome. Manchester Corporation opened Barton Aerodrome in 1928 but it proved to be unsuitable for large aircraft. Leeming, had become an authority on flying, (his book Pilots 'A' Licence published in 1935), was asked to find a new airport location by Manchester Corporation. He recommended the Ringway site, which was initially rejected, but eventually they opened the aerodrome in 1938.

== House and garden ==
In the early 1930s he built Owlpen, York Drive, Bowdon where he developed a two-acre garden, all up the left hand side of York Drive and Theobald Road. At the end of the plot near to the Lady of the Vale Convent he spent the whole of the 1930s developing the garden and built The Barn out of reclaimed handmade bricks and old oak beams and with a Priest's Hole. During this time he became an expert on delphiniums and wrote The Book of the Delphinium (1932) and The Garden Grows (1935) on the building of the garden. He bred pedigree sheep and had an interest in bee-keeping. In 1936 he created 'Claudius the Bee' for the Manchester Evening News for which Walt Disney bought the film rights. In that same year he wrote Airdays, based on his experiences as a pioneer of gliding and light-aeroplane flying in Great Britain. The house itself named ' Badgers', in Theobald Road Bowdon, was built after the war in 1948. He is said to have helped fund the neighbouring Bollingworth House given by Fanny Baxter to establish Our Lady of the Vale Convent on condition that he reserved the right to use an entrance from Theobald Road. His wife Gladys lived there for the last five years of her life.

== RAF and World War II ==
Leeming joined the Royal Air Force in 1939 and was commissioned a flight lieutenant and appointed to Air Marshal Owen Tudor Boyd as his aide-de-camp. Leeming accompanied Boyd on his way to Egypt, in November 1940 as the new Deputy Commander of the British Air Forces in the Middle East. En route for Malta, the Wellington bomber in which Boyd and his staff were passengers was forced down over enemy-controlled Sicily by a group of Italian fighters. They destroyed confidential papers by setting the aircraft on fire, which included some £250,000 in currency, 11 million pounds in 2019. Leeming was taken prisoner and to Villa Orsini close to the Sulmona PG 78, POW camp near Rome in the Abruzzo. 'He organised and ran the house, mess and batmen, and looked after us very well'. 'Leeming became one of my great friends in captivity. He had left his business at the beginning of the war to join the RAF., having been for years a skilled amateur pilot'. He later was transferred to Castello di Vincigliata camp near Florence, where he was to hatch his plan for escape. He took inspiration from a book published in 1920, The Road to En-Dor? in which tells the true story of how a couple of British officers' attained freedom from a Turkish prison camp in WW1 through an extremely elaborate pretence of mental illness.

=== Prisoner of war and escape ===
As Lieutenant General Sir Philip Neame wrote 'Leeming gave up running the mess in December 1941, after we had been in Florence for three months to devote himself to the plot'. 'His character interested me. I place him as an extremely shrewd man, very persistent and determined, but pleasant to deal with, with a most kindly nature and a flair for getting on with nearly anyone. But he delighted to appear to others as simple and easily overcome by circumstances, a pose which he developed so successfully that he managed to get himself repatriated as a very bad nervous breakdown case. I must say he worked hard for months on this astounding plot. He succeeded so well that the international Medical board, with Swiss and Italian doctors, unhesitatingly accepted his case for early repatriation' (in April 1943). 'However, he reached England and returned to duty. We used to spend many hours on the battlements of Castello di Vincigliata discussing [my] book, how to be an author and many other matters'. Leeming was influential in the escape plans, suggesting using the castle well system camouflaging and coding secret communications to MI9. He was repatriated from Lisbon on the British hospital ship HMHS Newfoundland (Furness Withy Line 6,791 tons). As he describes in his book, 'In the late afternoon, of 8 April 1943, we went aboard the British hospital ship, which was lying at the quay ready to sail for England. I walked quickly up the gangway, and as I felt my two feet touch the ship's deck I looked up – I suppose I am too sentimental – at the flag flying from the masthead. "Done it!" I said aloud.'... we docked at Avonmouth early in the morning of 23 April 1943. The sky was grey, and it was raining.'

== Post war ==
After the war he wrote about his repatriation in April 1943 by feigning paranoia in The Natives are Friendly (1951). He also told of his experiences as a prisoner of the Italians during the Second World War in Always To-Morrow (1951). His war-time adventures in Italy inspired him to write some novels like It always rains in Rome (1960), A Girl like Wigan (1961), and Arnaldo my Brother (1962). Leeming described himself as 'a reluctant engineer', but retired as the managing director of a Broadheath firm, a suburb of Altrincham near Manchester, England which, amongst other feats, made money by extracting oil from rags and then selling the discarded material for further use. He died in 1965 aged 69.

== Books by John F Leeming ==
Many of Leeming's books have been translated into French, Italian, German, Danish, Finnish and Dutch

- The Book of the Delphinium, 1932, 76 pages, Sir Isaac Pitman & Sons Ltd, London, several illustrations
- Pilots 'A' Licence, 1935, Sir Isaac Pitman & Sons Ltd, London
- The Garden Grows: a Story, 1935, George G Harrap & Co., London
- Manchester & Aviation, 1935 ?
- Airdays, 1936, George G Harrap &Co., 301 pages, some b/w photos, (author's experiences as a pioneer of gliding and light-aeroplane flying in Great Britain)
- Claudius the Bee, 1936, George G Harrap & Co., London, 128 pages, Illustrated by Richard B.Ogle. 128p ISBN 0-245-53584-5 (also in French ('Jacky au pays des abeilles'), Dutch, German ('Claudius der Hummelkönig'))
- Thanks to Claudius, 1937, George G Harrap & Co Ltd,157 pages (also in French)
- The Natives are Friendly, 1951, E. P.Dutton & Company, New York, 1951, pages 195–222, (PoW, World War II experiences)
- Always To-Morrow, 1951, George G Harrap & Co. Ltd, London, 188pages, Illustrated with photographs and maps, (Tells of the author's experiences as a prisoner of the Italians during the Second World War)
- A Girl Like Scranton (a novel) 1961, Farrar, Straus and Cudahy, New York (title changed for US readers)
- A Girl like Wigan, (a novel) 1961, George G Harrap & Co (exotic adventure across Europe)
- It always rains in Rome, (a novel), 1960, Avon Books, (A hilarious account of what happens at the end of the war when the townspeople of Fontana d'Amore discover that their 14th-century bridge is about to be blown up by overzealous liberators on the one hand and a retreating enemy on the other) (also in German ('Die Brücke von Fontana d'Amore'), Italian, Dutch, Danish)
- Arnaldo my Brother, 1962, (a novel) 1962, Harrap, UK, (using his experiences at Villa Orsini and Castello di Vincigliata) (also in German 'Mein Bruder Arnaldo')

== See also ==
- LPW Glider
- Vincigliata
- Lancashire Aero Club
- HMHS Newfoundland
- Helvellyn

== Bibliography and sources ==
- 1901, UK Census Records for England,
- Altrincham Historical Society, Biographies of local people.
- Lancashire Aero Club, History, http://www.lancsaeroclub.co.uk
- Playing with Strife, (1947), The Autobiography of a Soldier, Lt-Gen. Sir Philip Neame, V.C., K.B.E., C.B., D.S.O., George G Harrap & Co. Ltd, 353 pages, (written whilst a POW, in Vincigliata - Campo PG12, contains a scale plan of Castello di Vincigliata, and photographs taken by the author, just after the war)
- Farewell Campo 12, (1945), Brigadier James Hargest, C.B.E., D.S.O. M.C., Michael Joseph Ltd, 184 pages contains a sketch map of Castello Vincigliata page 85, (no index)
- Happy Odyssey, (1950), Lt-Gen. Sir Carton De Wiart, V.C., K.B.E., C.M.G., D.S.O., Jonathan Cape Ltd, in PAN paperback 1956, re-printed by Pen & Sword Books 2007, 287 pages, ISBN 1-84415-539-0 (Foreword by Winston S Churchill)
- To War with Whitaker, (1994), Hermione Ranfurly, William Heinemann Ltd, London, 375 pages, ISBN 0-434-00224-0
- Always To-Morrow, (1951), John F Leeming, George G Harrap & Co. Ltd, London, 188 pages, Illustrated with photographs and maps, (Tells of the authors' experiences as a prisoner of the Italians during the Second World War)
- The Natives are Friendly, (1951), E. P.Dutton & Company, New York, 1951, pages 195–222, (PoW, World War II experiences)
- Airdays, (1936), George G Harrap & Co., 301 pages, some b/w photos, (author's experiences as a pioneer of gliding and light-aeroplane flying in Great Britain)
- Manchester's early airfields: establishment, development and operations, (2004), R.A.Scholefield, an extensive article in "Moving Manchester", Lancashire & Cheshire Antiquarian Society, ISSN 0950-4699
- The Lancashire Aero Club: Three Score Years and Ten, (1992), Peter Maher, Lancashire Aero Club, ISBN 0-9524099-0-9
- http://www.flightglobal.com/pdfarchive/index.html The Flightglobal Archive, of 'Flight Magazine' published during the 1920s and 1930s, featured numerous articles on aviation and business news concerning John Leeming, his wife Sarah and associates, Lancashire Aero Club and his company, Northern Airlines (Manchester) Ltd.
- List of unreleased Disney animated shorts a. List of unreleased Disney animated shorts and feature films, Date: 1947, Series: Mickey Mouse, Title: Mickey and Claudius the Bee, Description: 'Mickey is shrunk down to the size of a bee and given a tour of the hive by Claudius'. This cartoon was explored as a possible release. But, for a variety of reasons, production was never completed, and this cartoon was never made.
