= RAF Ringway =

Former RAF base in Cheshire, England

RAF Ringway
- Near Ringway, Cheshire in England

Site information
- Type: Royal Air Force satellite station
- Owner: Air Ministry
- Operator: Royal Air Force
- Controlled by: RAF Fighter Command * No. 9 Group RAF

Location
- Shown within Cheshire RAF Ringway (the United Kingdom)
- Coordinates: 53°21′14″N 2°16′30″W

Site history
- Built: 1938
- In use: June 1938 - 1957
- Battles/wars: European theatre of World War II

Airfield information
- Elevation: 235 feet (72 m) AMSL
Runways
Direction	Length and surface
00/00	Concrete/Tarmac
00/00	Concrete/Tarmac
00/00	Concrete/Tarmac

Royal Air Force Ringway or more simply RAF Ringway is a former Royal Air Force satellite station at Ringway, Cheshire, England, near Manchester. It was operational from 1939 until 1957. The site is now occupied by Manchester Airport.

== Prewar years ==
Manchester's first municipal airfield was Manchester (Wythenshawe) Aerodrome (open from April 1929), and then Barton Aerodrome (open from January 1930) just west of Eccles. Barton Aerodrome was planned to be the main airport for Manchester, but it became clear by 1934 that its small boggy grass airfield was inadequate for the larger airliners then coming into service including the Douglas DC-2 and DC-3.

A new airport site at Ringway, eight miles south of Manchester city centre, was selected from several alternatives, and this was to become the site of the RAF station by early 1940. Construction of the all-grass airfield began in late 1935, and the first (westerly) portion opened in June 1937 for use by Fairey Aviation. The remaining airfield areas and the terminal building were opened for public use on 25 June 1938. Initially known as Manchester (Ringway) Airport, then Manchester International Airport, from 1986 it has been designated simply Manchester Airport.

== Second World War ==
Construction of a Royal Air Force station, including two large hangars, workshops, barrack blocks and ancillary accommodation, began in the northeast corner of the airport during spring 1939, with phased completion during early 1940. One of the hangars was intended for use by No. 613 (City of Manchester) Squadron, but this unit had been moved south at the outbreak of war. RAF Ringway was therefore initially used by No. 1 (Coastal) Operational Training Unit RAF, RAF Coastal Command.

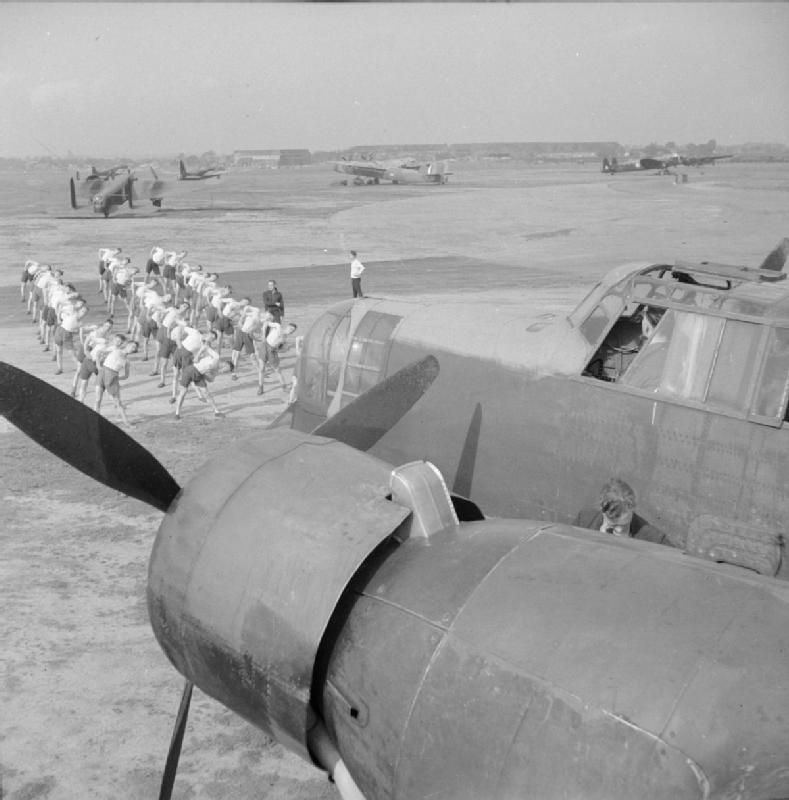
Paratroopers from the 6th (Royal Welch) Parachute Battalion undergoing physical training with No. 1 Parachute Training School at Ringway, with a Whitley III in foreground, August 1942

From June 1940, Ringway became the wartime base for No. 1 Parachute Training School RAF, which was charged with the initial training of all allied paratroopers trained in Europe (60,000) and for development of parachute drops of equipment; also the development of military gliding operations. Men and women agents of the Special Operations Executive (SOE) were also trained to jump.

Comedian Frank Muir, serving in the RAF, spent several years at the school in the photographic section taking slow motion film of jumps on a project intended to decrease the frequency of parachutes failing (sometimes called "Roman Candle"). He recalled the Special Operations Executive training centre, housed in an Edwardian house on the outskirts of the airfield, where he was assigned to take pictures of the agents for identity documents. There was an additional SOE holding centre in a large house in nearby Bowdon.

No. 14 Ferry Pilots Pool of the Air Transport Auxiliary (ATA) was based at Ringway between 1940 and 1945. The veteran ATA aircrews delivered many thousands of military aircraft to operational units which had been built, modified or repaired at Ringway, Woodford, Barton and at other northwest aircraft factories and airfields.

Over 4,400 warplanes were built at Ringway by Fairey Aviation and Avro. The aircraft included the Fairey Battle, Fairey Fulmar, Fairey Barracuda, Bristol Beaufighter, Handley Page Halifax and Fairey Gannet. Avro's experimental department, located in Ringway's 1938-built northside hangar between mid-1939 and late 1945. In 1939 they completed the prototype Avro Manchester bomber. The aircraft failed to meet operational requirements and, with only 202 built, it was subject to several radical modifications, culminating in January 1941 with the Avro Manchester Mk III, the prototype of the famous Avro Lancaster bomber. The last warplane prototype to be assembled here was the Avro Lincoln bomber which first flew from Ringway on 9 July 1944. Avro built over 100 Avro York military transport aircraft in the three 1941/42 southside hangars. Two hangars built in the NW corner of the airfield during 1939/40 for use by Fairey Aviation remain in use, one for aircraft maintenance and the other for ground operations. The other three wartime hangars built for Fairey's were demolished during the 1990s.

No. 613 (City of Manchester) Squadron had its home base at RAF Ringway during 1939 and again from 1946 to 1957 when it flew Supermarine Spitfires and de Havilland Vampire jet fighters in its fighter role as a unit within the Royal Auxiliary Air Force.

The following units were also here at some point:

- No. 4 Squadron RAF
- No. 5 Service Flying Training School RAF
- No. 6 Anti-Aircraft Co-operation Unit RAF
- No. 7 Anti-Aircraft Co-operation Unit RAF
- No. 8 Anti-Aircraft Co-operation Unit RAF
- No. 50 (Army Co-operation) Wing RAF
- No. 50 Elementary and Reserve Flying Training School RAF
- No. 64 Squadron RAF
- No. 78 Squadron RAF
- No. 107 (Transport) OTU RAF
- No. 110 (Anti-Aircraft Co-operation) Wing RAF
- No. 253 Squadron RAF
- No. 264 Squadron RAF
- No. 296 Squadron RAF
- No. 663 Squadron RAF
- No. 1951 Reserve AOP Flight RAF
- Airborne Forces Establishment
- Airborne Forces Experimental Establishment
- Central Landing Establishment RAF
- Central Landing School RAF
- Development Unit (Central Landing Establishment) RAF
- Glider Exercise Squadron RAF
- Glider Exercise Unit RAF
- Glider Flight RAF
- Glider Training Squadron RAF
- Manchester University Air Squadron
- Parachute Exercise Squadron RAF
- Parachute Training Centre RAF
- Parachute Training School RAF
- Parachute Training Squadron RAF

== Post war ==
On the disbandment of 613 Squadron (and all other Royal Auxiliary Air Force Squadrons) in March 1957, RAF Ringway was closed and its hangars and other buildings handed over for civil airline operations including cargo and maintenance.

The two 1939/40-built hangars remained in use until late 1995, when they were demolished to permit construction of the new Terminal 3.

By January 2009, the only surviving building from RAF Ringway was the Officers Mess (Building 217) in Ringway Road and until recently used as the Airport Archive. It was still standing, but disused, in November 2011. It was later demolished to make way for a further extension of car parking facilities.

== Memorials and monuments ==
A garden outside Olympic House (near Terminal 1) houses several carved stone memorials to the wartime units based at Ringway and to 613 Squadron.

There is a monument, formerly in Terminal 1 but now in Manchester Airport railway station, to Alcock and Brown, the pioneers of transatlantic flight; of them, John Alcock was born in Old Trafford, near Barton Airport.

== Bibliography ==
- Falconer, Jonathan (2012). RAF Airfields of World War 2. UK: Ian Allan Publishing. ISBN 978-1-85780-349-5.
- Holmes, Harry (2004), Avro – the History of an Aircraft Company, Marlborough Wilts: Crowood Press, ISBN 1-86126-651-0
- Scholefield, R.A. (1998), Manchester Airport, Stroud: Sutton Publishing, ISBN 0-7509-1954-X
