= Winifred Brown =

Sportswoman, aviator, author, first woman to win King's Cup Air Race (1930)

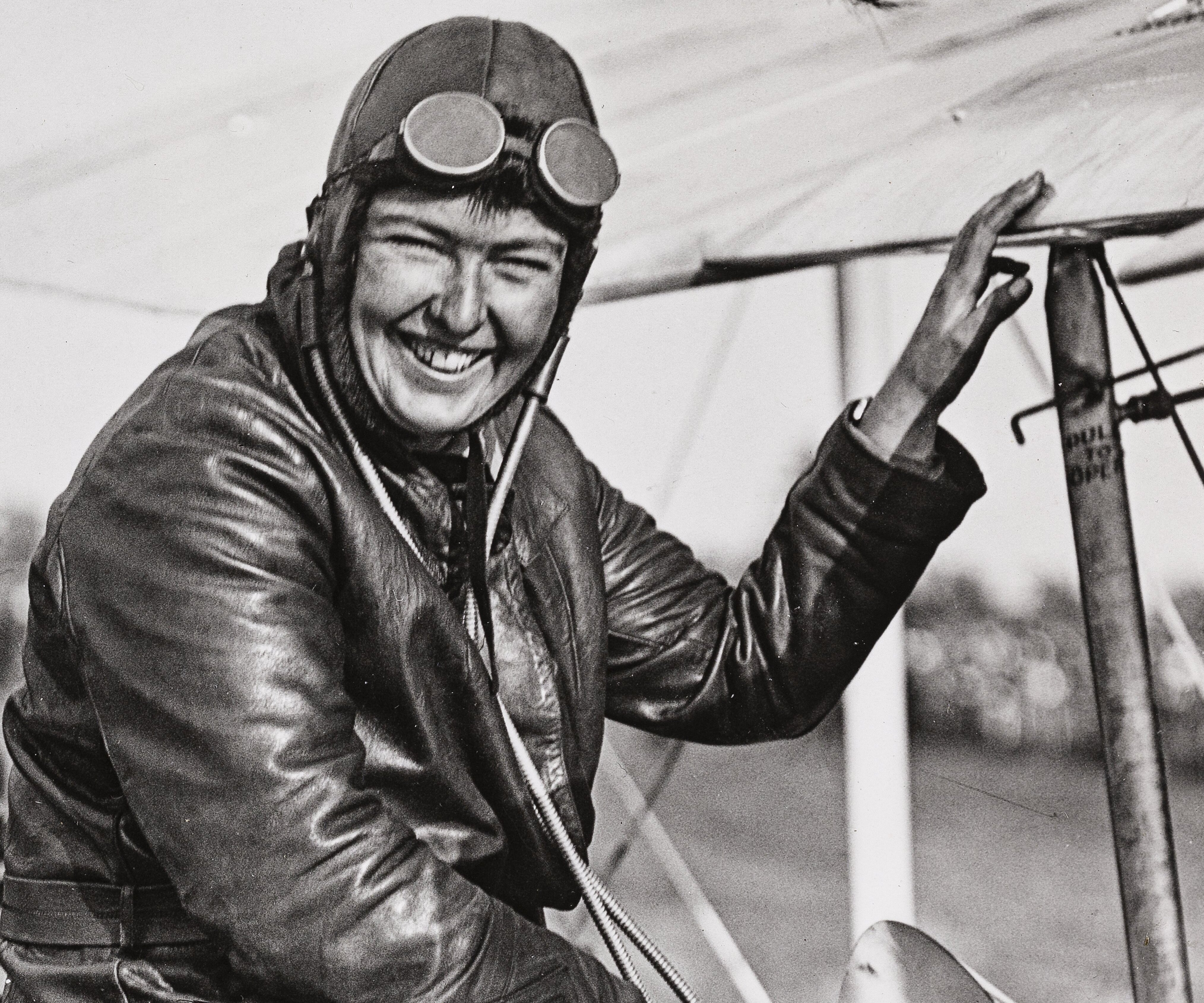
- after winning the King's Cup
- Born: 26 November 1899; Sale, England
- Died: 30 July 1984 (aged 84); Hove, England
- Other name: Winifred Adams
- Occupation: Aviator
- Known for: Winning the King's Cup air race in 1930
- Spouse: Ron Adams
- Partner: Einar Sverdrup
- Children: Tony Adams

Winifred Sawley Brown (also known as Winifred Adams; 26 November 1899 – 30 July 1984) was an English sportswoman, aviator and author. She was the first woman to win the King's Cup air race (in 1930). The race has been running annually since 1922.

== Early life and career ==
Brown was born in 1899 in Sale, Cheshire. Her father was the director of a butchery firm. She was expelled from school at the age of 14, after writing graffiti featuring the headteacher on a toilet wall. She made her first flight in 1919, at Hooton Park Aerodrome, and she later took up flying lessons with the Lancashire Aero Club at Woodford Aerodrome, from where she received her pilot's licence in 1927. As the first female member of the Lancashire Aero Club, she was not allowed to take part in club events that were defined for all-male participants.

In 1927, she was photographed in her pilot's outfit by the Lafayette company. One of these portraits, which was owned by Pinewood Studios, is in the National Portrait Gallery. She competed in the Talbot O'Farrell Handicap at the Filton Aerodrome in May 1928. Her father bought her an aircraft (an Avro Avian) for £500.

=== King's Cup air race ===
In July 1929, Brown attended the King's Cup air race at Squires Gate Aerodrome, which inspired her to consider entering the race the next year, aiming for some credibility for herself to take part in events reserved for men. With the moral support of both her father and boyfriend, in the winter of 1929/1930, she eventually decided to formally enter the 1930 race. The Lancashire Aero Club principals did not support her competing, as they worried her result might look bad for the club. The 9th edition of the race for 1930 attracted a record entry list of 101 aircraft, to be piloted by many notable aviators including several former King's Cup winners, the Schneider trophy winner of 1929 Richard Waghorn, and Augustus Orlebar who had set the world speed record with 357.7 mph (575.7 km/h) flying a Supermarine S.6. Others included Geoffrey de Havilland, Geoffrey de Havilland Jr., Lady Mary Bailey, Winifred Spooner, Edgar Percival, Frederick Guest, and the Master of Sempill. On 4 July 1930, she arrived at London Air Park, Hanworth, with her companion Ron Adams, but she was denied a room at the local aero club where a social pre-race event was taking place, and instead stayed elsewhere.

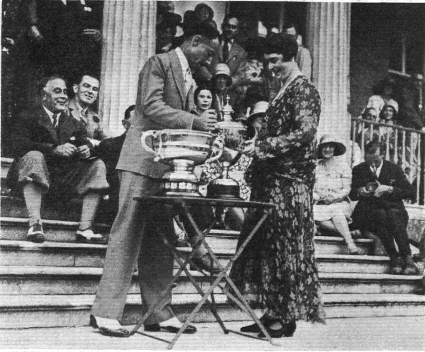
Sir Philip Sassoon presents the King's Cup to Win Brown July 1930

On 5 July 1930, the King's Cup air race was staged to start and finish at Hanworth, starting at 7:00 am, following a circular route of 753 miles (1,212 km) via Hamble, Whitchurch (Bristol), Birmingham, Hooton Park, Barton Aerodrome, Woodford Aerodrome, Sherburn-in-Elmet, Cramlington (Newcastle), Hedon Aerodrome, Ratcliffe Aerodrome, and back to Hanworth. Fixed-time refuelling stops were at Whitchurch, Barton, Cramlington and Hedon. She started the handicap race in her Avro Avian biplane accompanied by Adams as a passenger. At Whitchurch, she was told that she had passed several competitors, then at Barton she learned from her father that she was in third position. As the weather outlook became grim, she had the advantage of having learned to fly in this region. She chose to fly over the Woodhead Pass crossing the Pennine Hills towards Cramlington, where she was received with the news she was then in the lead. She crossed the finishing line at Hanworth in her Avro Avian III G-EBVZ at 6:16 pm, followed ten minutes later by A.S. Butler (Chairman of de Havilland Aircraft Co), flying a DH.60M Moth G-AAXG into second place. The race had 88 starters, of which 61 achieved completion of the course at Hanworth the same day. It was the race with the most participants to date. With an average speed of just over 100 miles per hour (160 km/h), Winifred Brown was the first woman to win the King's Cup air race. The King's Cup trophy was presented to her by Sir Philip Sassoon. Sassoon was a politician, and the Air-Commodore of No. 601 Squadron RAF known as "the millionaires squadron". She was also presented with the Siddeley Trophy, as the winner who was also a member of the Lancashire Aero Club, a qualifying light aeroplane club. After her victory in one of the most prestigious air races in the United Kingdom, she was welcomed in several official ceremonies and events including a reception in the House of Commons.

== Later life ==
After flying, Brown went to South America where she explored the length of the River Amazon in a ship and canoe.In 1935, she moved from flying and exploring to sailing. This had been her father's interest; she bought a boat, and had it re-fitted by the original builders. She sailed together with Adams, and they set off for the Arctic, travelling to Spitzbergen. In 1939, her book about sailing off the Norwegian coast, Duffers on the Deep, was published.

From 1976, Brown lived on Seaway, a motor yacht bought by her son Tony, moving between Lymington and Brighton. Her King's Cup trophy was displayed in the aft cabin.

Brown died in Fairlight Nursing Home in Hove on 30 July 1984, following a series of strokes.

== Private life ==
Einar Sverdrup was described as the love of Brown's life. He lost his life during the Second World War.

Brown married Edwin R "Ron" Adams, and her son Tony took his surname. Tony Adams became a successful actor.

Brown was a sportswoman active in a variety of disciplines; she also golfed and played hockey and ice hockey for England.

Brown's biography Winifred Brown Britain's Adventure Girl No.1 was written by Geoff Meggitt.
