= Lancashire Aero Club =

The Lancashire Aero Club is the oldest established flying club in the United Kingdom, it was founded in 1909 to organise the Blackpool Aviation Week, Britain's first officially recognised air show.

== Early history ==
- October 1909: The original club was founded in Blackpool.
- Late 1922: The club was re-formed by John F. Leeming and a group of friends who had started to build a glider in Leeming's garage at his home in Bowdon near Altrincham Cheshire. It was named "Aero Club" because at the time many racing pigeon clubs called themselves "<placename> Flying Club".
- Early 1924: The LPW Glider was completed and was taken to Alexandra Park Aerodrome. The club flew the glider many times at Alexandra Park, launching it by towing behind a car.
- August 1924: Alexandra Park Aerodrome closed. The club moved to Avro's Woodford Aerodrome.
- 21 July 1925: Alan Cobham delivered the club's first powered aircraft (a de Havilland DH.60 Moth) to Woodford
- August 1925: Another followed it.
- 22 December 1926: John F. Leeming and Bert Hinkler (1892–1933), the chief test pilot of A.V.Roe Avro Manchester, landed on Helvellyn in the Lake District. This was the first aeroplane to land on a mountain in Great Britain.
- Mid 1927 onwards: Woodford-built Avro Avians joined the club. The LAC's fleet continued to be based at Woodford.
- 1929: Aircraft were frequently detached to Manchester (Wythenshawe) Aerodrome for the convenience of locally resident members.
- 5 July 1930: Winifred Brown, a club member, won the King's Cup Air Race hosted at Barton Aerodrome, flying an Avro Avian biplane built at Woodford.
- September 1939: The Second World War stopped club activities. The club's aircraft were stored in Avro's hangars at Woodford where the club was based until then.

== Post-war operations ==
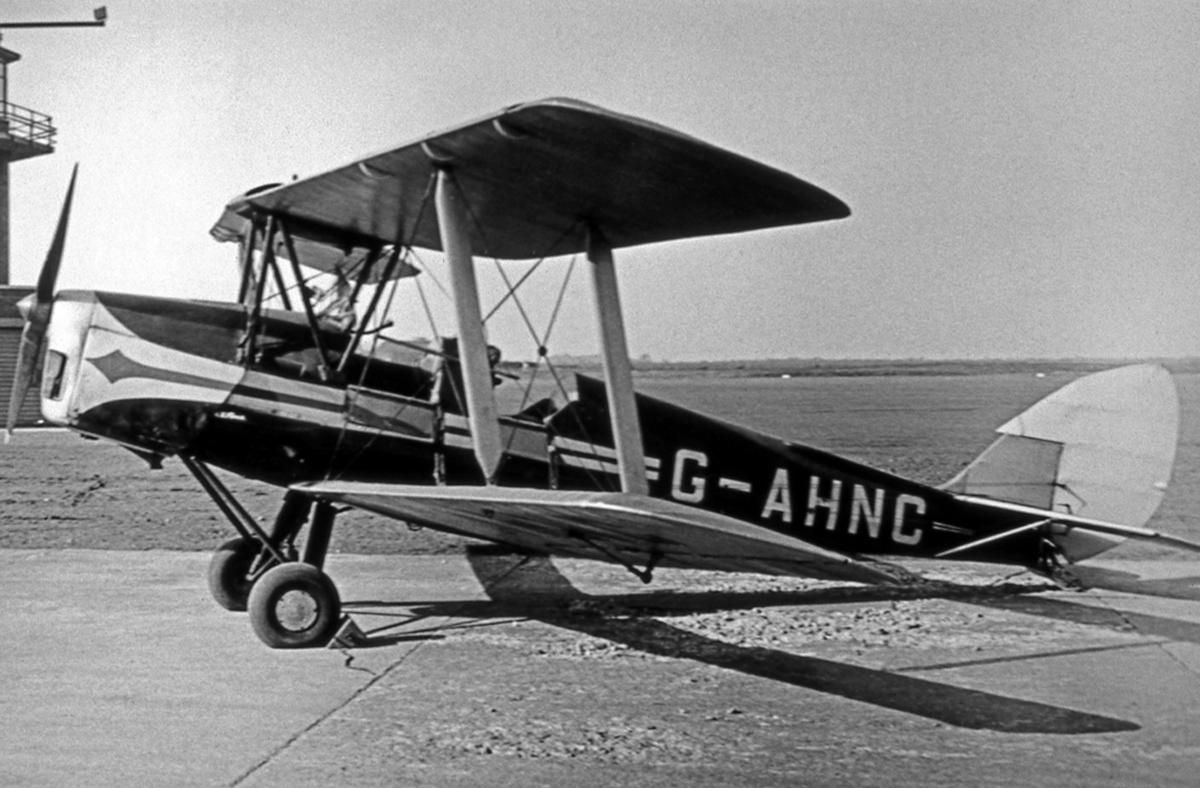
De Havilland Tiger Moth of Lancashire Aero Club wearing their dark blue and silver colour scheme at Barton Aerodrome in October 1952

- 1946: Avro asked the club to relocate elsewhere. The club moved to Barton Aerodrome. Flying training and aircraft rental was provided to members, initially using Auster Autocrat and De Havilland Tiger Moth aircraft.
- 2007: The club decided to leave Barton, due to terms being required by Peel Holdings that the Lancashire Aero Club's committee deemed to be unacceptable.
- July 2009: The club started operating from a single grass strip airfield at Kenyon Hall Farm, near Warrington, which it is hoped will become its new home if planning permission is granted.
