= Oscar Garden =

New Zealand aviator and horticulturist

- Born: Oscar Garden; 21 August 1903; Tongue, Sutherlandshire, Scotland
- Died: 6 February 1997 (aged 93); Middlemore Hospital, Auckland, New Zealand
- Spouses: Greta Norlén (m. 1937; div. 1948) Helen Lovell (m. 1948; died 1997)

Oscar Garden (21 August 1903 – 2 June 1997) was a Scottish-born Antipodean aviator and horticulturist.

== Early life ==
Garden was born in Tongue, Sutherlandshire, Scotland on 21 August 1903. He was the second son and fourth child to Robert Garden and Rebecca (née Ward). His father was a businessman who originated from Orkney, whilst his mother was a Salvationist from the Isle of Man.

Following the break-up of his parents' marriage, Garden, together with his mother, moved to Manchester and then to the Isle of Man, where he attended Douglas High School for Boys, whilst his father and two of his sisters emigrated to New Zealand.

In 1920 Garden joined his father in New Zealand where he found employment with his father's business in Timaru.

Garden moved to Australia in 1928 where he became a garage proprietor in Sydney, New South Wales, before returning to England in 1930. Garden obtained his pilot's licence at the Norwich Flying School with the intention of returning to Australia by way of flight.

== Aviation ==
On 16 October 1930, Garden embarked on a flight from Croydon Aerodrome, London, to Wyndham Aerodrome in Western Australia. Before the 18-day flight in a second-hand De Havilland Gipsy Moth, he had only 40 hours' solo flying experience. He flew in concert with Mrs Victor Bruce from Jask, Iran, to Rangoon, Burma, part of her record-setting air-sea circumnavigation.

In February 1931, Garden became the first to land a plane on Stewart Island. The landing was recreated 90 years later, in February 2021, using a Tiger Moth.

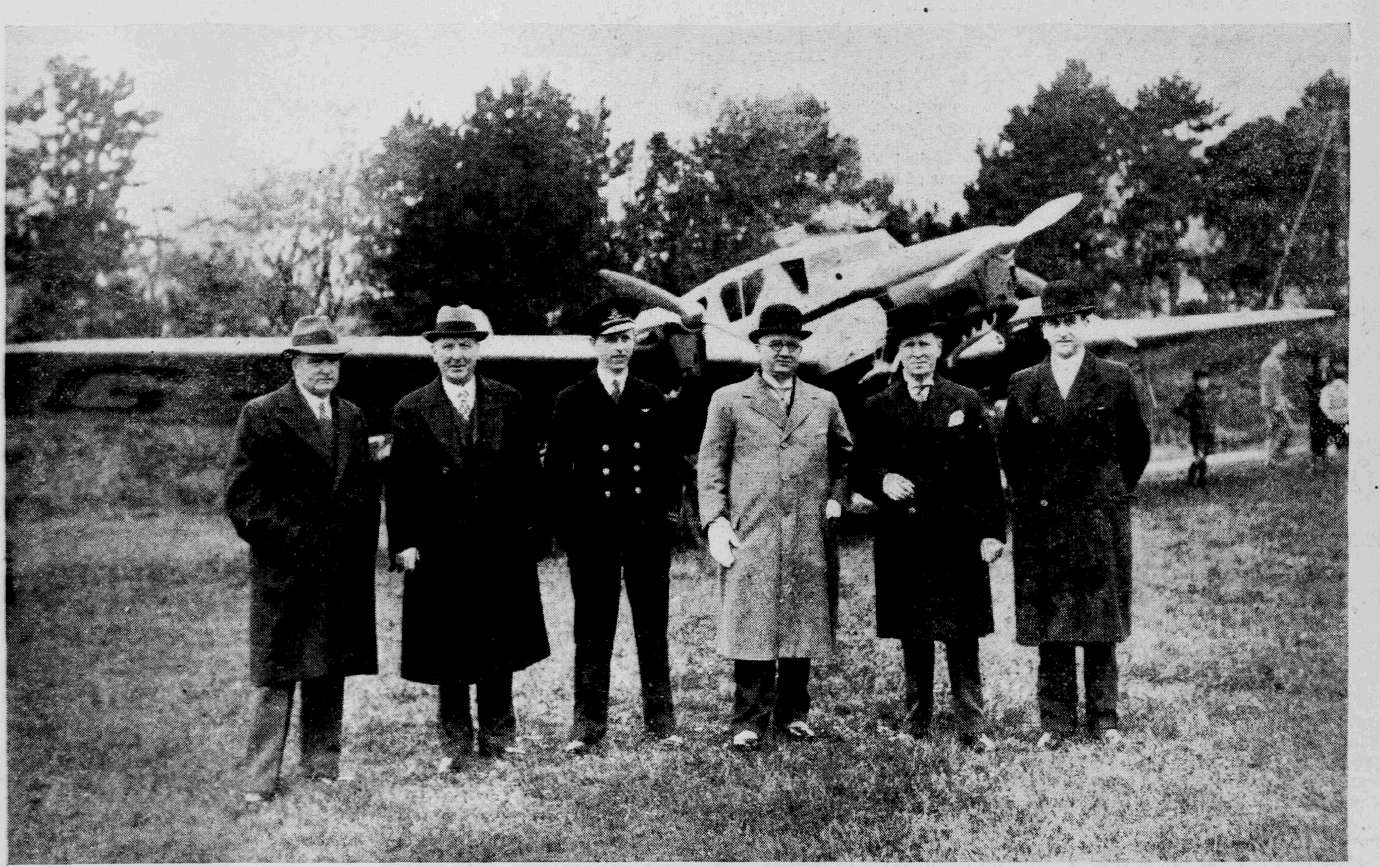
The opening of Hall Caine Airport, Isle of Man, Tuesday, 30 April 1935. Left to right: T.J. Rubens and J.J. Faragher, vice-chairman and chairman of Ramsey Town Commissioners; Captain Oscar Garden; Alderman J. Skillicorn (Mayor of Douglas); Percy Shimmin (Douglas Town Clerk) and W.E. Faragher (Ramsey Town Clerk)

During his time operating for United Airways Limited Captain Garden was instrumental in the establishment of scheduled commercial air services from Hall Caine Airport, Isle of Man, during the mid 1930s.

The Manx headquarters of the operation were situated at Hall Caine with Captain Garden appointed by United Airways to supervise the flying operation.

Capt. Garden went on to become chief pilot, mainly on Short Empire flying boats, and later operations manager for Tasman Empire Airways Ltd, the forerunner to Air New Zealand.

A major feature article "Sundowner of the Skies – Mary Garden takes flight with her father" on his 1930 flight from England to Australia was published in the Australian Financial Review in 2005.

In 2019, Sundowner of the Skies: The Story of Oscar Garden, The Forgotten Aviator was published, written by one of his daughters, Mary Garden. It was shortlisted for the NSW Premier's History Award 2020 for a book of international significance. In 2020, Oscar's youngest daughter Annamaria Aurelia Garden self-published her own book "Oscar Garden: A Tale of One Man’s Love of Flying". One review of the two books noted that it was odd to have two biographies written about the same person from two different familial perspectives, but that they complement each other. After it was discovered that most of "Oscar Garden: A Tale of One Man’s Love of Flying" had been plagiarised, it was withdrawn from publication and all copies removed from libraries and museums. Her sister, Mary Garden, mentioned this in an essay for Meanjin 18 June 2022. Annamaria died on 19 August 2023 after a short illness.

Graham Hoete, an acclaimed Māori artist, has created a mural of Oscar Garden, now on display at Tauranga Airport, New Zealand. The mural was unveiled on 11 August 2019 with Oscar's daughter Mary and other family members present.
