= Hall Caine Airport =

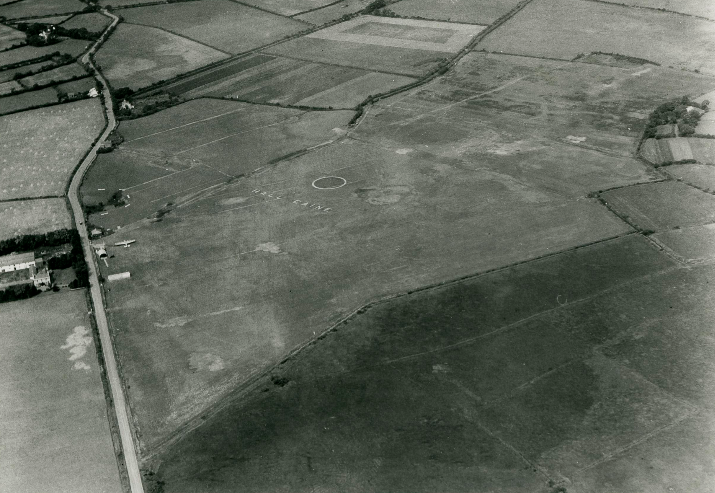
- Aerial view of Hall Caine Airport, Isle of Man
- IATA: N/A; ICAO: N/A

Summary
- Airport type: Private
- Owner: Hall Caine Manx Airport Ltd
- Location: Ramsey, Isle of Man
- Elevation AMSL: 30 ft (9.1 m)
- Coordinates: 54°20′12″N 004°26′19″W

Map
- Location in Isle of Man

Runways
Direction	Length		Surface
Direction	ft	m	Surface
18/36	2,400	732 (800yds)	Grass
09/27	2,400	732 (800yds)	Grass
00/00	0	0	Grass

Hall Caine Airport, also referred to as Close Lake Airfield, was an airfield on the Isle of Man located near the town of Ramsey. It was named after the author Sir Thomas Henry Hall Caine CH, KBE by his sons Gordon Hall Caine and Derwent Hall Caine, who initiated the project, and was the first airport in the British Isles to be named after a person.

From 1935 to 1937 it handled domestic scheduled passenger flights to English, Scottish and Irish airports. By 1937 it had fallen into disuse, primarily due to its location.

== Close Lake Airfield ==
=== Origins ===
The original site was known as Close Lake Airfield, as it occupied land on Close Lake Farm, which itself was part of the estate of Sir Thomas Henry Hall Caine. The location was chosen for its size (about 30 acres (12 ha)) and flatness, allowing a take off length of approximately 400 yd (370 m).

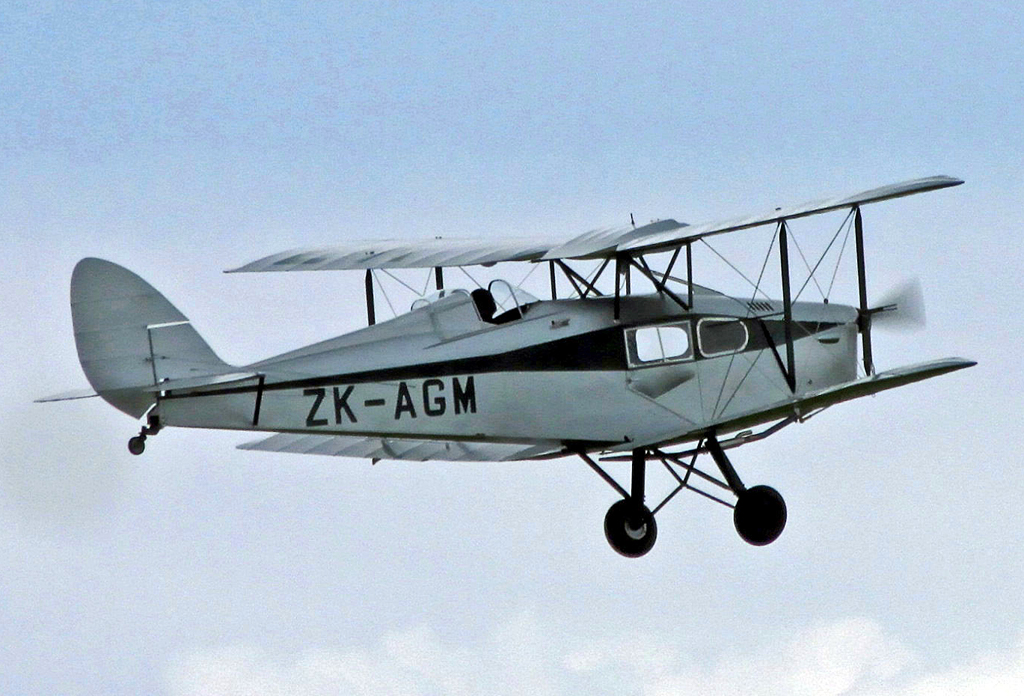
A DH. 83 Fox Moth, identical to G-ABVI which operated the first recognized commercial passenger flight from Close Lake Airfield on 11 October 1932.

A few light aircraft had used the landing field in the early 1930s, mainly for visits to the Isle of Man for the TT Races. The first recorded passenger flight was on Tuesday, 11 October 1932, from Romford Aerodrome via Stanley Park Aerodrome (Blackpool), touching down just after 13:00. After a short stay the aircraft departed with two passengers; one bound for London and the other bound for Blackpool. However the flight was eventful, with strong winds resulting in the pilot being unable to land at Blackpool. Continuing through lowering cloud and freshening winds the Fox Moth eventually landed near Haddon Hall in Derbyshire, due to a shortage of fuel.

The sporadic use of the airfield continued into 1933. A further documented flight was that of a DH.80A Puss Moth which arrived on 21 January 1933, its passenger visiting the nearby Glen Auldyn Estate. Another arrival was at the end of April; the aircraft ferried a family to the Isle of Man from Blackpool and then took a party of local people including the Ramsey Harbour Master on a pleasure flight around the locality.

=== Development ===
By the early summer of 1934 the airfield was being seriously considered as an aerodrome for the Isle of Man. A two aerodrome concept was favored, with Close Lake serving the north of the island and Ronaldsway serving the south. Close Lake's weather record, superior to Ronaldsway's, was shown in June when eight aircraft landed on the airfield, six of them carrying passengers, because they could not land at Ronaldsway due to fog. Three of the aircraft belonged to West Coast Air Services, then engaged in operations from Ronaldsway and operating in connection with the TT Races, whilst the others were operated by Midland & Scottish Air Ferries with one being a private aircraft on charter to the Daily Mail.

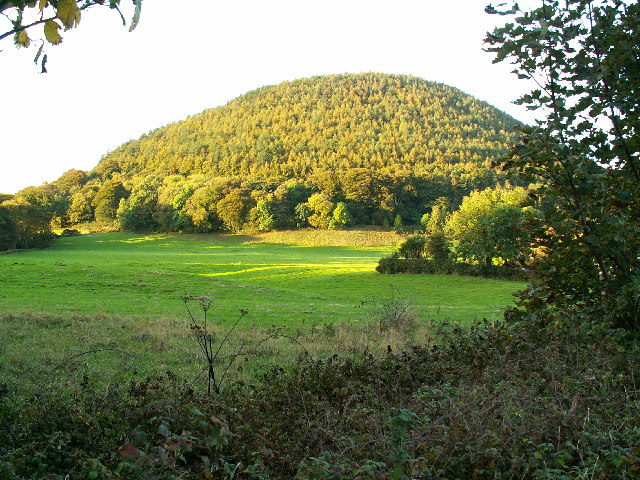
Skyhill was identified as a potential hazard to aircraft operating from Close Lake Airfield.

During July 1934, a local architect, Joseph Teare, was tasked with surveying the site at Close Lake. His findings were sent to the Air Ministry with Wing Commander Allen being sent to the airfield in August so as to verify them.

Sir Alan Cobham had also favoured the north of the island for an airfield and had identified about six suitable sites between Ballaugh and the Point of Ayre in an earlier survey. In August 1934, Derwent Hall Caine flew into Close Lake and also undertook a thorough survey of the main landing area as well as the surrounding fields.

The findings were favorable, and the Lieutenant Governor of the Isle of Man, Sir Claude Hill, granted Hall Caine a temporary civil licence for an aerodrome on Close Lake Farm in August 1934. The temporary operating licence was replaced by a permanent licence granted by the Air Ministry in September.

In September 1934, some improvements were made at the airfield, including land filling with 400 tons of silt taken from the bed of the Sulby River in addition to the construction of a Nissen-type hangar, a petrol pump and the installation of a telephone.

Close Lake was seen as a better site for an aerodrome than Ronaldsway, and was said to have a better surface. The site had no obstructions for aircraft landing into the prevailing (southwesterly) wind and the land could be easily drained. One shortcoming, however, was Close Lake Airfield's proximity to high ground about 1 mile (1.6 km) to the south. In comparison, the land at Ronaldsway was uneven, and the large folds in the surface needed filling in, but it was closer to the island's capital, Douglas. Ronaldsway's susceptibility to sea mist and fog had been identified as early as 1934.

In late September 1934, a deputation from Railway Air Services visited the Isle of Man. The deputation was joined by the Tynwald Aerodrome Committee in order to identify a suitable landing ground. They visited many sites on the island, including Ronaldsway and Close Lake.

An air mail service was inaugurated in August 1934 by Railway Air Services but ceased in late September. The main reason cited was an unsuitable landing ground for winter operations; Ronaldsway was deemed not up to the required standard, and whilst Close Lake was deemed suitable with regard to the load bearing of the ground, it was considered too small to handle the size of aircraft used for the contract.

== Hall Caine Aerodrome ==
Both Sir Thomas Henry Hall Caine's sons, Gordon Hall Caine and Derwent Hall Caine, were particularly keen on the development of an aerodrome on the site, as they saw it as another memorial to their late father. They also wished to involve the Ramsey town commissioners in the project, as they felt the aerodrome would bring immense benefit to the town.

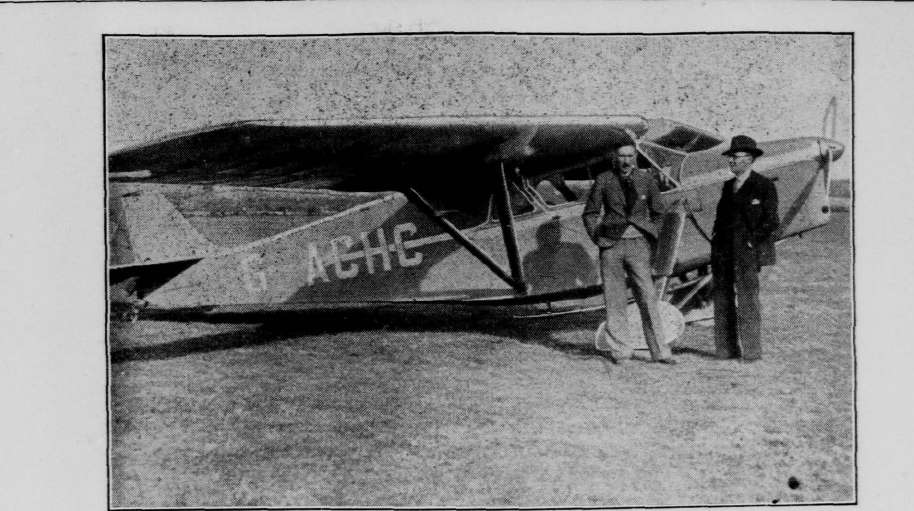
Derwent Hall Caine pictured with his Leopard Moth at Close Lake Airfield, April 1935.

At the time there was talk of linking the aerodrome with another landing ground at The Strang, just outside of Douglas, but this was discounted by Derwent as it would be difficult to convert it into a licensed aerodrome. However, as part of the development at Close Lake Airfield, arrangements for the conveyance of passengers to other parts of the island were undertaken.

=== Construction ===
Further work on improving the area began in early April 1935, and Derwent began to oversee some of the work and to make the arrangements needed to start a regular air service to Blackpool. This work included the removal of hedges and fences, the leveling of ground and the addition of extra land to the north and west of the site. This enabled a takeoff run of 800 yd (730 m) in any direction and increased the area of the airfield to 70 a (75,000 sq ft).

Although the work had not been completed, Hall Caine was nonetheless satisfied with the state of the airfield. Although heavy rain had fallen, the surface had stood up to the wheels of a motorcar, which had made no impression on the ground. This was considered a good test for the aerodrome: if the wheels had sunk into the ground then evidently it would have been impossible to operate aircraft of any size.

In an interview with the Ramsey Courier, Derwent said the site was to be known as Hall Caine Manx Airport. This was subsequently changed to the Hall Caine Airport, Ramsey. With all parties satisfied, Hall Caine Airport officially came into being on 30 April 1935.

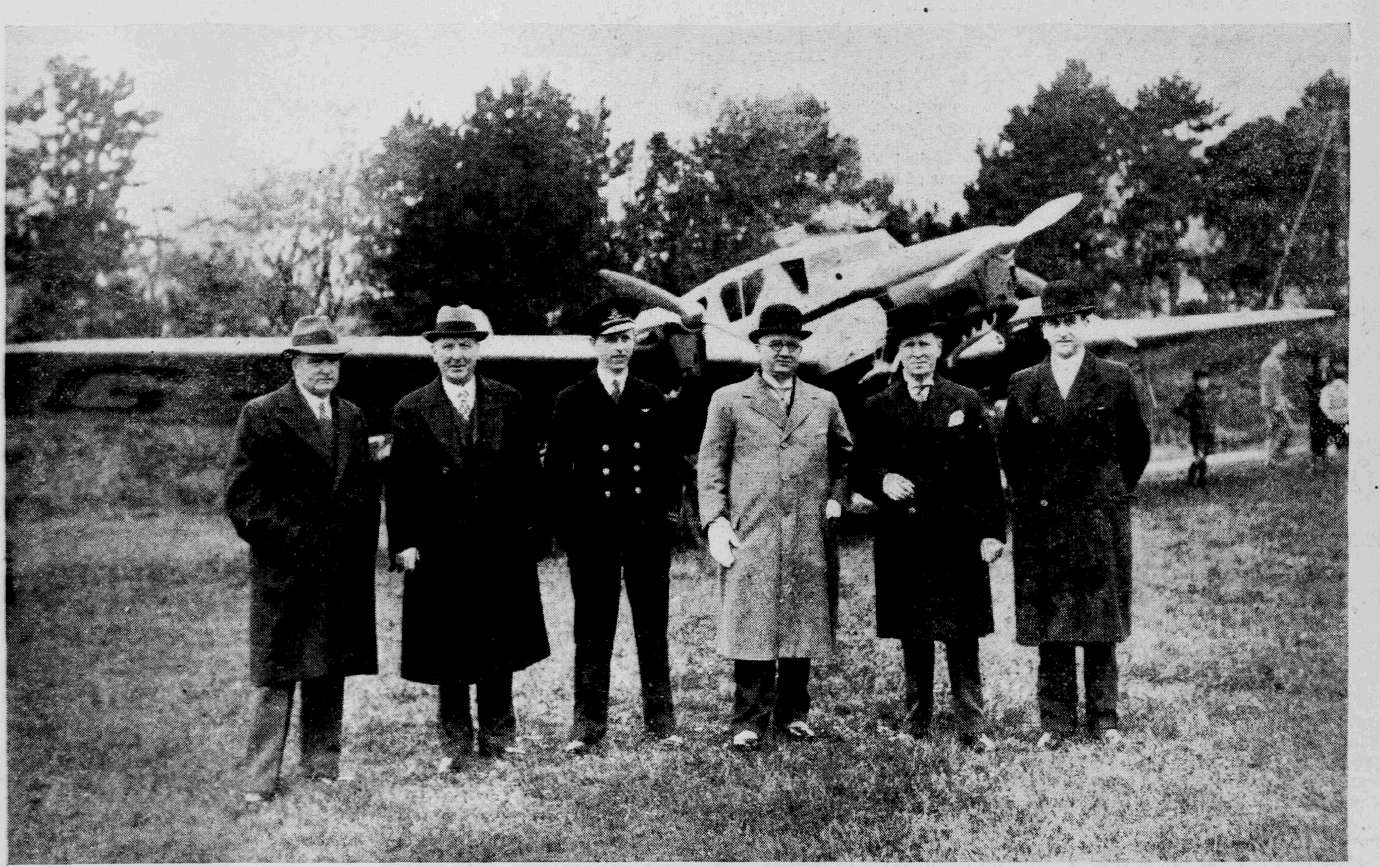
The opening of Hall Caine Airport, Tuesday, 30 April 1935. Left to right: T.J. Rubens and J.J. Faragher, vice-chairman and chairman of Ramsey Town Commissioners; Captain Oscar Garden (pilot); Alderman J. Skillicorn (Mayor of Douglas); Percy Shimmin (Douglas Town Clerk) and W.E. Faragher (Ramsey Town Clerk)

=== Operational life ===
==== 1935 ====
===== United Airways Ltd =====
On completion of the expansion, Aircraft Exchange and Mart became the lessees of the aerodrome as scheduled services were about to commence. W. Thurgood of United Airways Limited visited Hall Caine Airport in early April and announced a skeleton service between the UK and the Isle of Man was to be introduced immediately, and this, in turn, was to be upgraded to a full scheduled service beginning in May. The occasion was marked by an official ceremony at Stanley Park. Those in attendance included Sir Philip Sassoon, Alderman J. Skillicorn (Mayor of Douglas), the Mayor of Carlisle, Sir Kingsley Wood and Derwent Hall Caine.

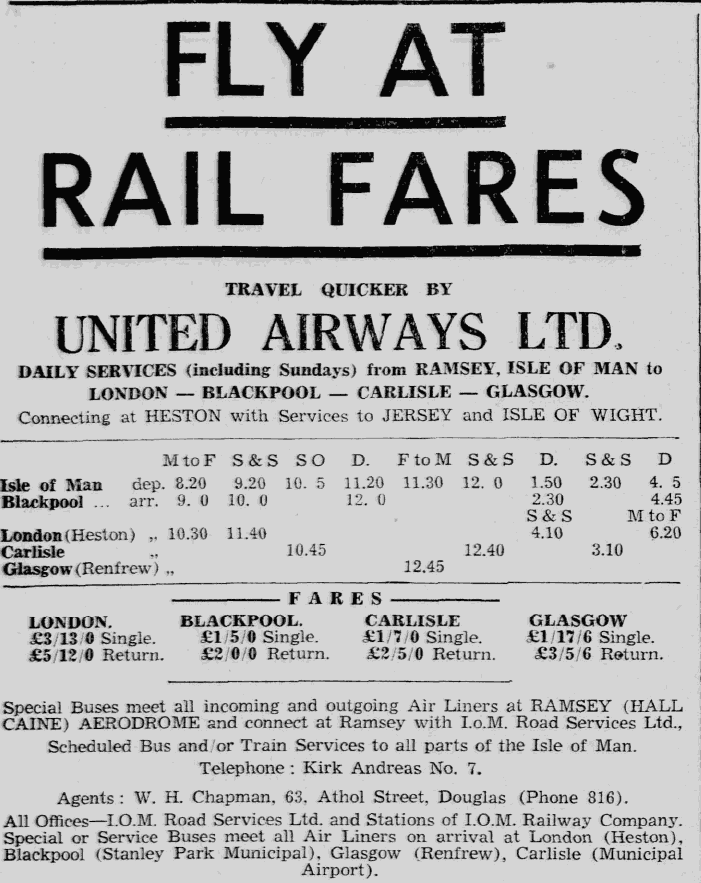
United Airways Timetable for their schedule to and from Hall Caine Airport, summer 1935.

Whitehall Securities Ltd, owners of United Airways Ltd and their sister airline Spartan Air Lines began to build on their fledgling operation, introducing a schedule from London via Stanley Park Aerodrome (Blackpool), Hall Caine and then onwards to Dublin (Collinstown).

By mid-May the United Airways service between Hall Caine and Blackpool was operating four times a day and twice daily to Crosby-on-Eden, Carlisle, using Spartan Cruisers. Another service was started by Northern Airways Ltd and operated in conjunction with United Airways. On 17 May 1935, Northern and Scottish Airways commenced a service from Glasgow (Renfrew) Airport to Hall Caine, operating Fridays, Saturdays and Mondays, using a De Havilland Dragon. Initially, the Glasgow service operated three times weekly, but by early July it had peaked at twice daily.

The Manx headquarters of the operation were situated at Hall Caine with Captain Oscar Garden, a renowned aviator who had made what was described as a "sensational" flight from England to Australia in 1930 appointed by United Airways to supervise the flying operation. William Goudie was engaged as the traffic officer, tasked with overseeing the ground operation.

A busy day of operations occurred at the end of May. Hall Caine received its first celebrity passenger, George Formby, who combined his visit with the Mannin Moar as well as the preparation for his film No Limit.

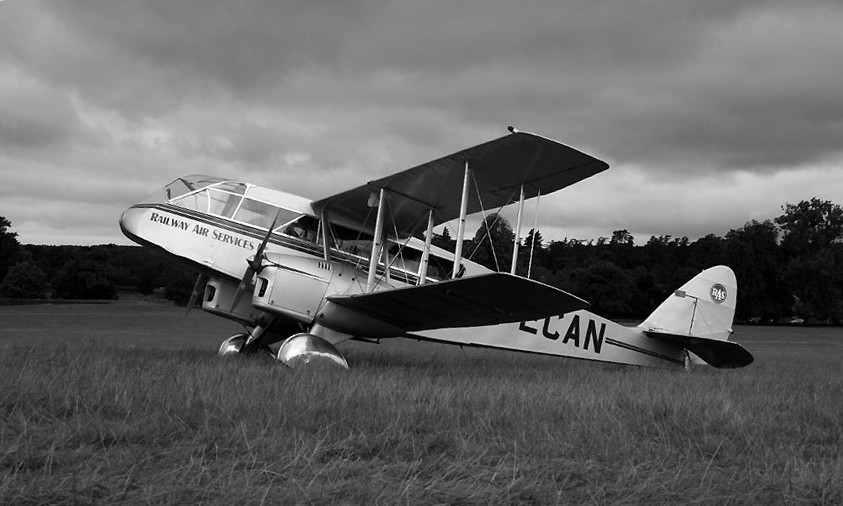
DH84 Dragon. This type of aircraft was the mainstay of United Airway's operation to and from Hall Caine.

In the summer of 1935, United took delivery of an Armstrong Whitworth Argosy from Imperial Airways. They had used the type on their Middle East routes from the early 1920s. The aircraft was converted to carry 28 passengers for pleasure flights around Blackpool, but it was also a frequent visitor to Hall Caine when traffic demanded.

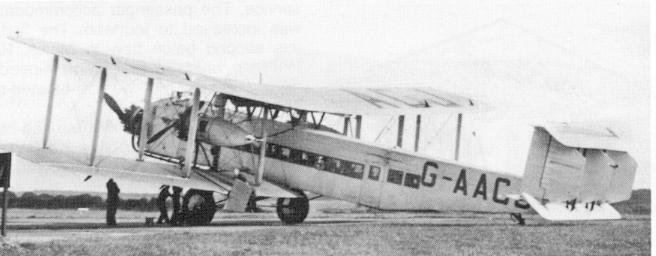
Argosy G-AACJ (City of Manchester) was the largest type of aircraft to operate in and out of Hall Caine Airport.

In October a service was inaugurated between London (Heston Aerodrome), Blackpool, Hall Caine and Belfast.

Blackpool and West Coast Air Services resumed the air mail service from February to October 1935. From 1 November, United Airways secured the main contract from the Post Office. It was then passed on to their subsidiary Northern and Scottish as a result of a round of amalgamations which took place at the end of 1935. United Airways Ltd was wholly amalgamated with Spartan Air Lines and Hillman's Airways, and the three names were replaced with British Airways Ltd. This company was to join Imperial Airways in 1940 thus forming the British Overseas Airways Corporation.

As the mail service continued, the Post Office insisted that all air mail letters from Douglas and the south of the island were to be handled at Ronaldsway, while the mail from Ramsey and the north was to be collected at Hall Caine. This meant a connecting flight between the two airports.

==== 1936 ====
===== British Airways Ltd =====
The beginning of 1936 saw heavy rain falling across the Isle of Man and the aerodrome was subjected to some flooding in early January which disrupted operations. The problems continued throughout the month and had become so acute that United Airways were forced to transfer their operation to Ronaldsway. The overflowing of the Sulby River inundated a large area of the surrounding countryside and was the main cause of the airport being flooded. It was not until Sunday, 2 February following tests was it decided the airport was safe for the resumption of operations.

Infrastructure work, however, continued with the erection of a hangar on the airfield. It was constructed from steel girders and galvanized iron on a concrete base and was capable of accommodating three Spartan Cruisers.

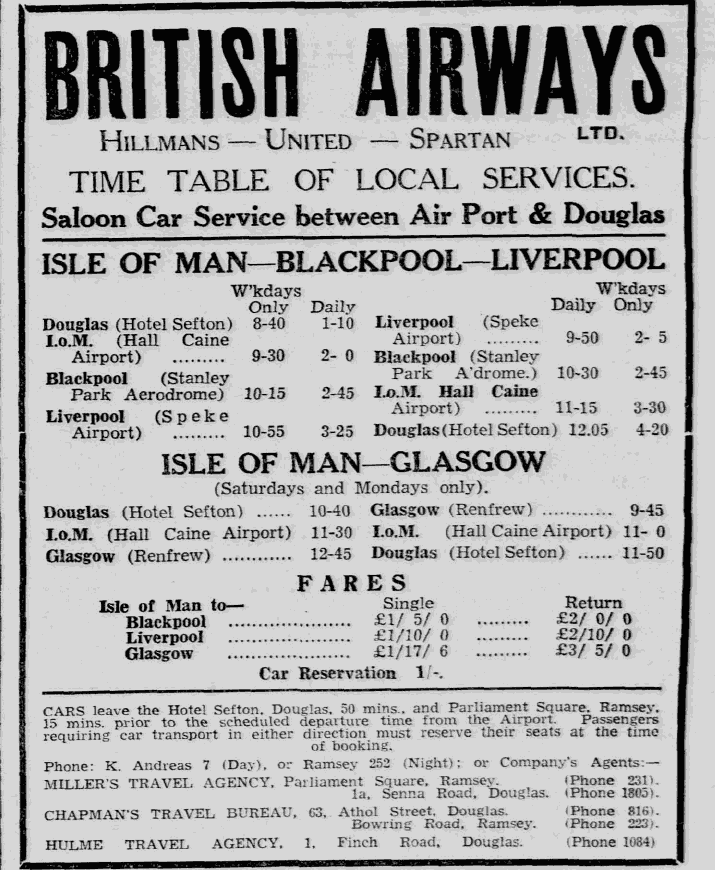
British Airways Ltd's Hall Caine Schedule, summer 1936

In the summer of 1936 Northern and Scottish, now acting for British Airways Ltd., were operating the following routes involving Hall Caine: Glasgow (twice daily by the end of September); Liverpool–Blackpool (two or three flights a day); Belfast and Carlisle (daily).

The mail link between Hall Caine and Ronaladsway also offered limited passenger availability. The service departed Hall Caine on weekday mornings at 07:00hrs, returning from Ronaldsway at 09:20hrs, with a one-way ticket costing five shillings and a return, seven shillings and six pence.

At this time a scheduled bus service from Douglas was introduced by the Isle of Man Road Services, allowing passengers to connect at regular intervals with services from Hall Caine. The service departed the Central Bus Station in Douglas, calling at the Sefton Hotel and the Villa Marina. The service continued on to Parliament Square, Ramsey prior to arriving at Hall Caine.

British Airways Ltd commenced their summer schedule at the end of May, operating from Hall Caine to destinations in England, Ireland and Scotland.

A busy day was recorded on Saturday, 18 July, when 160 passengers were landed at the airport. This included the arrival of the Western Brothers who flew in from Elmdon Airport, Birmingham, by private charter to perform at the Villa Marina.

Heavy rain-blighted operations in late July causing the Sulby River to again break its banks flooding across large areas of Close Lake and Ballakillinghan. However, operations from the aerodrome were unaffected. This did, however, lead to the further dredging of the Lough Molla and Close Chairn watercourses in Lezayre, thus reducing the potential of future flooding.

George Formby returned to Hall Caine at the beginning of August. He arrived from Blackpool in a privately chartered aircraft with a party of friends to undertake some sightseeing.

In the first two weeks of August Hall Caine handled 1,200 passengers, some of whom were passengers of Railway Air Services whose Ronaldsway services were affected by fog. Again Hall Caine's weather record proved its worth at the end of August. It was again able to offer itself as a suitable weather alternate for Ronaldsway, which was again affected by coastal fog. By the end of August Hall Caine Airport had handled approximately 2,500 passengers.

The summer of 1936 also saw a record time set for a flight between Hall Caine and Ronaldsway. A mail flight, piloted by Capt. Wilson flying a British Airways Dragon Rapide with the assistance of a substantial tailwind, is reported to have made the flight in a time of six minutes. The ground speed attained on the flight is reported to have reached 259 mph (417 km/h) in what were described as perfect conditions,

Further records were established at the end of September for flight times to and from Hall Caine. The first was on 26 September, when Capt. Ramsay, in command of a British Airways Spartan Cruiser covered the 72 nmi (133 km; 83 mi) from Carlisle to Hall Caine in 27 minutes from take off to touchdown. This was followed by a new record between Glasgow and Hall Caine, when Capt. Hankins recorded a time of 39 minutes for the 110 nmi (200 km; 130 mi) sector.

Scheduled services intermingled with charter operations, one such being arranged for members of Douglas Borough Council who visited Belfast to arrange the purchase of some horses for the Douglas Bay Horse Tramway.

For the autumn of 1936 and into the winter of 1936–7 there was a daily Liverpool – Blackpool – Hall Caine – Belfast – Glasgow service. In the preceding seven months to the end of 1936, 7,000 passengers had been landed at Hall Caine Airport. Spartan Cruisers, Dragons and Rapides were employed with an occasional visit from the Argosy though the latter was becoming increasingly expensive to maintain and was de-registered at the end of 1936. It was also during the latter part of 1936 that a Tynwald Committee were looking into the viability of installing a radio direction finder (RDF) at Ronaldsway as well as Hall Caine. In the end, the Air Ministry decided upon Ronaldsway as the preferred venue for the wireless station, with Tynwald unanimously decided to approve the proposal on Friday 20 November 1936.

The increased traffic had necessitated an increase in the staffing levels at the airport, and as part of this recognition the Isle of Man Road Services, in conjunction with British Airways, were in discussion to provide a bus service to meet all arrivals.

In the seven months to November 1936, 7,000 passengers had been landed at Hall Caine. The airport had also accommodated 39 diversions from Ronaldsway on 18 separate days between May and September.

The year 1936 ended as it had begun with heavy rain affecting the Isle of Man. Flooding was again prevalent over the Island's northern plain, however, operations at Hall Caine continued without disruption.

==== 1937 ====
===== Northern and Scottish Airways =====
By the beginning of 1937, the lease on the airfield was held by Northern and Scottish Airways. January saw increased passenger numbers with the corresponding period of 1936, with traffic over the Christmas period of 1936–37 also showing an increase. At this time Northern and Scottish operations from Hall Caine served Belfast, Liverpool, Glasgow and Blackpool.

On 26 January a Northern and Scottish Dragon Rapide, specifically fitted out for the task, conveyed an elderly couple (one of whom was on a stretcher) to Hall Caine from Barton Airport, Manchester, so as they could visit their son. The flight time was 50 minutes and the commander of the aircraft was Capt. McGevor, chief pilot of the southern section of Northern and Scottish.

In February operations continued despite snow covering the area, and extra flights were operated at the beginning of the month to meet increased bookings.

At the end of February the aerodrome's owners, Hall Caine Manx Airport Ltd, applied for a re-valuation of the lease of the airport. At this time Close Lake Farm comprised 255 acres (103 ha), which were let under lease to John Brew at a cost of £400 per annum. Of this 54 acres (22 ha) were used for the aerodrome and were sub-leased at £125 per annum. A submission was made by Derwent Hall Caine stating that investment in the region of several thousand pounds had been made in the development of the airport, however as was the case with other airports, Hall Caine was running at a loss. The airport had been valued at £223 gross and £215 rateable, and it was the contention of the owners that if the airport was to continue then the rateable assessment needed to be lowered. After consideration it was announced by the Board that the airport should be re-valued.

However, it was announced by Northern and Scottish Airways on 21 May that all services operated from Hall Caine had been suspended until 1 June; "pending important changes relating to the air services between the Isle of Man and mainland airports." The notice also stated that from 1 June Northern and Scottish would resume their service to Glasgow, services to Liverpool, Blackpool, Carlisle and Belfast (Newtownards) were to be abandoned. Consequently, all ticket holders on services operated by Northern and Scottish from Hall Caine were transferred onto Manx Airway services from Ronaldsway Airport.

====== Rationalisation & Closure ======
The primary reason for the cessation of services from Hall Caine was a rationalization of services operated by Northern and Scottish who at this time had entered into an undertaking with Manx Airways Ltd at Ronaldsway. This resulted in Manx Airways covering the schedules to Liverpool, Blackpool, Carlisle and Belfast which were formerly operated by Northern and Scottish, leaving only the Glasgow service being operated from Hall Caine. This was a severe blow to the town of Ramsey coming as it did at the beginning of the tourist season. The resumption of services from Hall Caine to Glasgow recommenced in early June. Aimed primarily at the increased traffic as a result of the TT Races, it continued throughout the month with 80 passengers arriving from Glasgow on 16 & 17 June. In addition Lord Londonderry's aircraft diverted into Hall Caine whilst en route from Rochester to Belfast (Newtownards) due to poor weather at the destination.

The Ramsey Ratepayers Association petitioned the Lieutenant Governor of the Isle of Man, Sir Montague Butler, with a view to his intervening to preserve commercial air operations from Hall Caine. The cancellation by Northern and Scottish Airways also lead to a special meeting by the Ramsey Commissioners. It was hoped that Railway Air Services would have commenced operations from Hall Caine, but any hope proved unfounded.

The recommencement of the Hall Caine–Renfrew service led to there being six rotations daily (three from Ronaldsway and three from Hall Caine) between the Isle of Man and Glasgow. Services between Hall Caine and Glasgow continued through until August and with the passing of the peak season for visitors to the Isle of Man the schedule became unsustainable.

A further night landing, again conducted with the aid of flares, was carried out on 29 August when a Northern and Scottish aircraft under the command of Capt. McGregor touched down at 21:25hrs.

At the end of September, it was announced by Northern and Scottish that they were to discontinue the service between Hall Caine and Glasgow. Piloted by Capt. McGeow, the final commercial flight from Hall Caine Airport departed at 4:15 pm on Saturday, 2 October 1937.

==== 1938 ====
===== Demise =====
Following the cessation of scheduled services, there were a few private visitors. The most notable visitor during the summer of 1938 was the celebrated Austrian glider pilot Robert Kronfeld, following what was described as a "thrilling flight" across the Irish Sea. The flight, in a Kirby Kite sailplane was undertaken from Kirby Moorside in Yorkshire and was the first glider crossing of the Irish Sea. The glider was under tow from an Avro Cadet intended to take a track to Blackpool to perform the crossing to Ronaldsway, however due to adverse weather conditions the aircraft and glider were blown 30 nmi (56 km; 35 mi) off course. Fixing their position over St Bees Head it was decided to make the crossing to Maughold Head. Descending to only 50 ft (15 m) above the sea the crossing was completed, but as a consequence of the weather it was deemed necessary to land at Hall Caine. The glider was detached above the airfield and landed after the aircraft, touching down just after 20:00hrs. Another occasion saw the test flight of a home-made Luton Minor (G-AFRC) - the first aircraft to be constructed on the Isle of Man - which had been built by Jack Carine, an engineer at the Pulrose Power Station. The test flight was undertaken by Fred Dodd, a local private pilot.

It was a brief hope a resumption of scheduled services would occur in the summer of 1938. However the removal of the main hangar and its subsequent erection at Ronaldsway, together with other infrastructure removals, ended such hopes. World events then played their part in ensuring that Hall Caine's scheduled services were not resumed. Following the cessation of scheduled services the Ramsey Gun Club were successful in agreeing on terms for the use of the airfield for Skeet shooting.

The inhabitants of the north of the island had become accustomed to the airport, which had shown signs of satisfactory development in 1935 and 1936, so much so that they had become to regard it as a permanent operation. The local press also alluded to a certain amount of prejudice which had existed concerning the Hall Caine operation in official circles. The fact that Hall Caine Airport was 20 mi (32 km) from the main center of Douglas was not in its favor and, as the Ramsey Courier of the day sadly observed, "with many airlines trying to make ends meet, there was bound to be contractions of services".

On the other hand, William Lambden in his work, The Manx Transport Systems makes reference to the fact that the Isle of Man Road Services Ltd. had carried over 10,000 passengers on their special airport route from Hall Caine to Douglas during the 1936–37 period.

== Subsequent use ==
In 1939 planning permission was granted to Jack Carine to erect a temporary hangar in order to accommodate the Luton Minor, which was based at Hall Caine. An incident of fuel starvation caused damage to the aircraft during a flight on 31 August 1939, after which it was described as "damaged beyond repair." With the outbreak of war on 3 September 1939, all private flying was banned and therefore what little use was being made of the airfield ceased. The Luton Minor was stored in the hangar for the duration, and was reported to be still there as late as 1957; after which no further information exists.

Having transferred from Jurby Aerodrome the airfield was again used, albeit briefly, by the Islanders Gliding club in the mid-1990s. Following an amalgamation, they subsequently relocated to Andreas Airfield.

== RAF ==
During the latter part of May 1937, Sky Hill was the venue for training exercises by the 125th Brigade, Territorial Army, comprising the 5th, 6th and 8th Lancashire Fusiliers. As part of this three RAF Hawker Hector army cooperation aircraft were detailed to co-ordinate the training and were hangared at Hall Caine. The aircraft were part of a force based at RAF Odiham and came from 13 Squadron. Having flown to the Isle of Man from RAF Sealand, the aircraft were engaged in the attacking and retreating exercises of the troops; in picking up and dropping messages, and in observation work. During the stay pilots gave an impromptu flying display by diving down onto the airfield and picking up messages.

Another Territorial Army camp, together with associated military exercises, occurred during August, and again three aircraft, together with a detachment of 30 engineers, were based at Hall Caine.

A further camp of the Territorial Army was held on the Isle of Man in 1938, when the 158th (Royal Welch) Infantry Brigade arrived at Ramsey. As with other exercises, an RAF aircraft was deployed to Hall Caine.

As part of the United Kingdom Government's Air Expansion Programme, Hall Caine Airport was inspected with a view to the establishment of a permanent RAF Station. However the site was not deemed to be of the required standard and land was instead sourced in the Parish of Jurby which saw the construction of RAF Jurby in 1938.

== Flying School ==
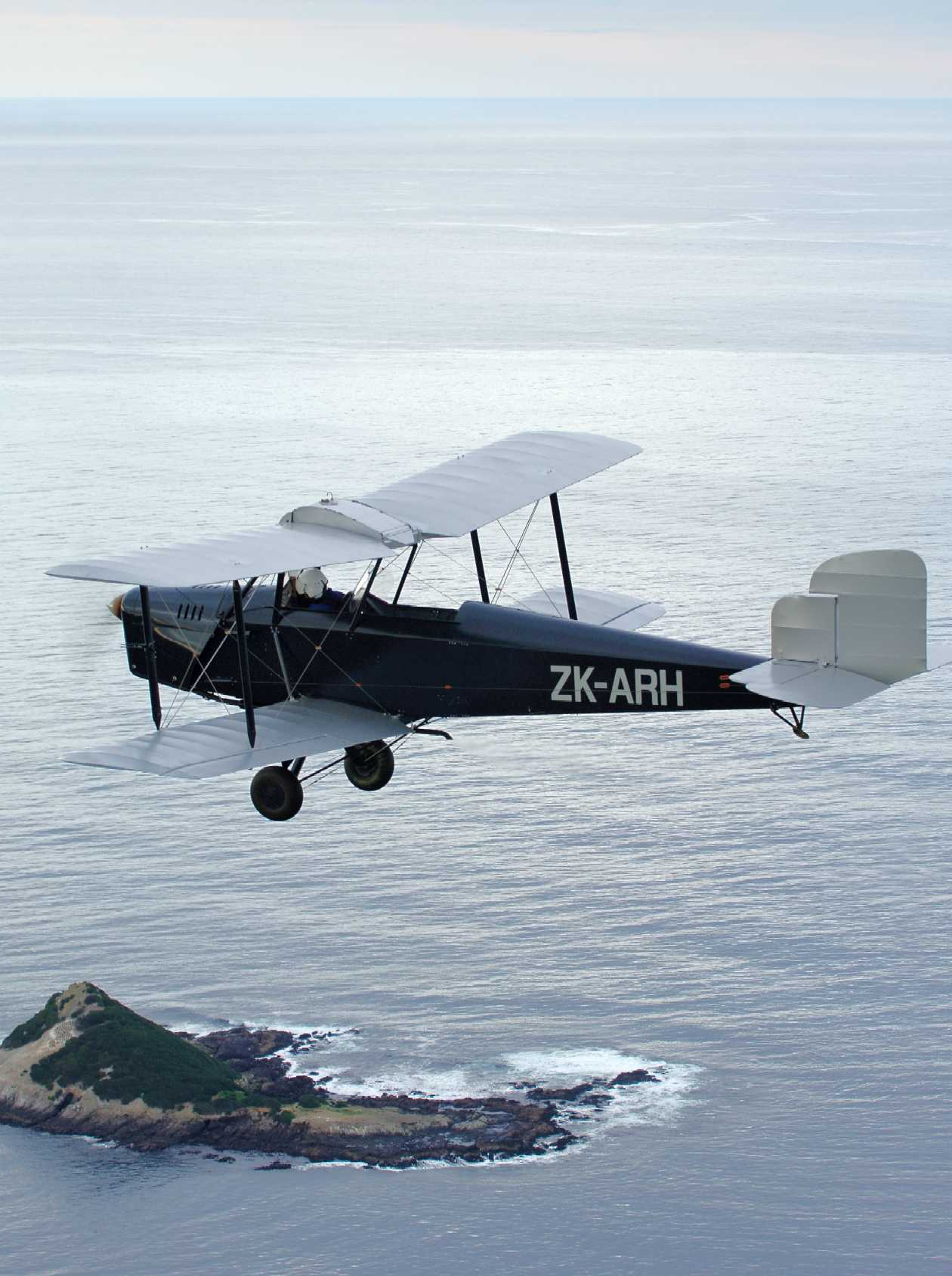
The Spartan Three Seater, which was one of the training aircraft employed at the Hall Caine Airport Flying School and was also utilised for pleasure flights.

In August 1935, the first flying school on the Isle of Man was set up at Hall Caine Airport operated by Aircraft Exchange and Mart. There was an initial difficulty in sourcing adequate training aircraft due to the government's Air Expansion Programme, however, an aircraft was procured. As part of the operation an additional hangar was constructed to accommodate the training aircraft, a Puss Moth. The Chief Flying Instructor was Flight Lieutenant R. Duncanson, an experienced instructor with over 20 years flying experience who had come from a previous position at the London Air Park. The instruction was carried out initially on the Puss Moth and this was subsequently joined by a Spartan Three Seater. At this time Hall Caine Airport was the only airfield on the Isle of Man which was licensed to carry out flying instruction offering tuition towards the qualification for a pilot's A Licence.

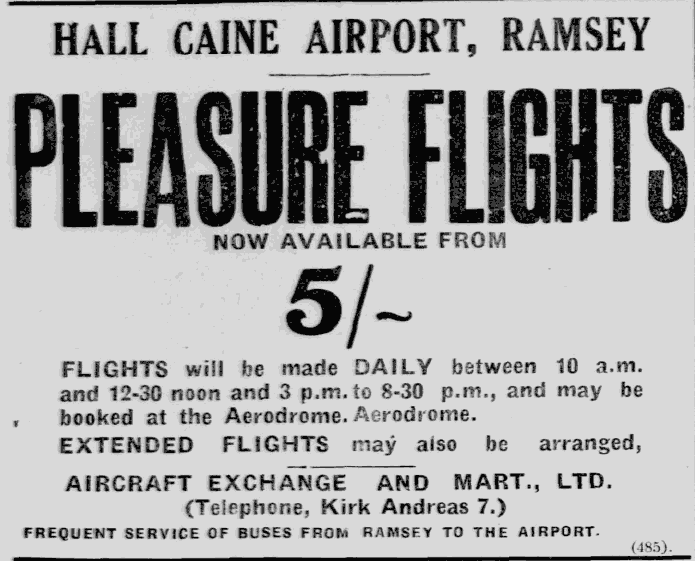
Advert for pleasure flights from Hall Caine Airport – summer 1935

Another source of revenue was pleasure flights. Aircraft Exchange and Mart quickly realized the potential and the pleasure flights proved popular during the summer months. Keen to publicize the opportunities at Hall Caine, Flt Lt. Duncanson took to the skies in Lord Patrick Stuart's Hendy Hobo and performed a series of aerobatics over Ramsey Bay.

== Location ==
One of the attributes of having an airfield on the northern plain of the Isle of Man is the weather record and this proved favorable for Hall Caine Airport.

The northern plain of the Isle of Man has always enjoyed a better weather record than that of the south where Ronaldsway Airport is situated.

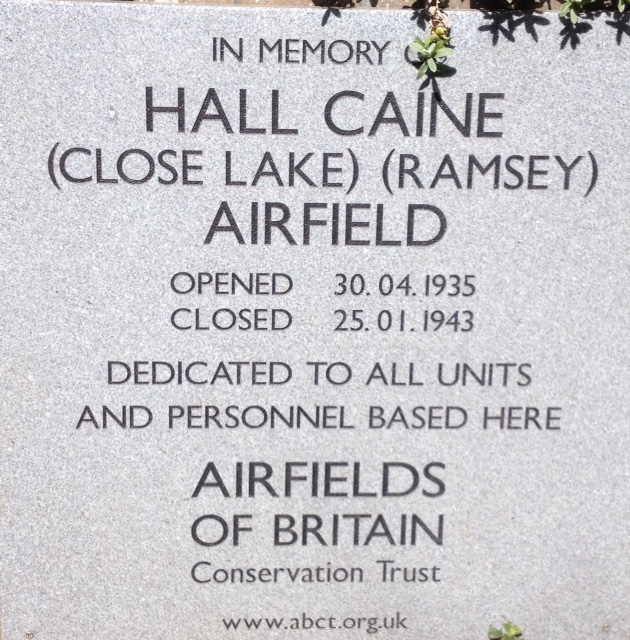
Plaque commemorating operations from Hall Caine Airport, Isle of Man

Because of its coastal location, fog is a particular problem at Ronaldsway with certain wind directions and mainly affects the airport during the summer months. During the operational life of Hall Caine Airport, there was much friendly rivalry between the crews of the airlines flying to the Isle of Man, and opportunities to gain extra revenue were always welcome. From its earliest days Close Lake had been a convenient diversionary airfield for aircraft flying to Ronaldsway; initially taking the form of private aircraft but increasingly commercial operators could rely on Hall Caine being able to offer itself as a suitable alternate. This occurred on numerous occasions with Hall Caine accepting the mail flight when it was unable to land at Ronaldsway. Another instance occurred on Tuesday 6 August 1935, when a West Coast Air Service aircraft from London was unable to land at Ronaldsway and subsequently diverted to Hall Caine. When Ronaldsway was "out" due to bad weather, N.S.A. staff were quick to suggest passengers get a refund and fly with them to Hall Caine which never suffered from fog. From the period of June to September 1936, there was total of 39 diversions from Ronaldsway Airport to Hall Caine as a consequence of fog affecting the south of the island.

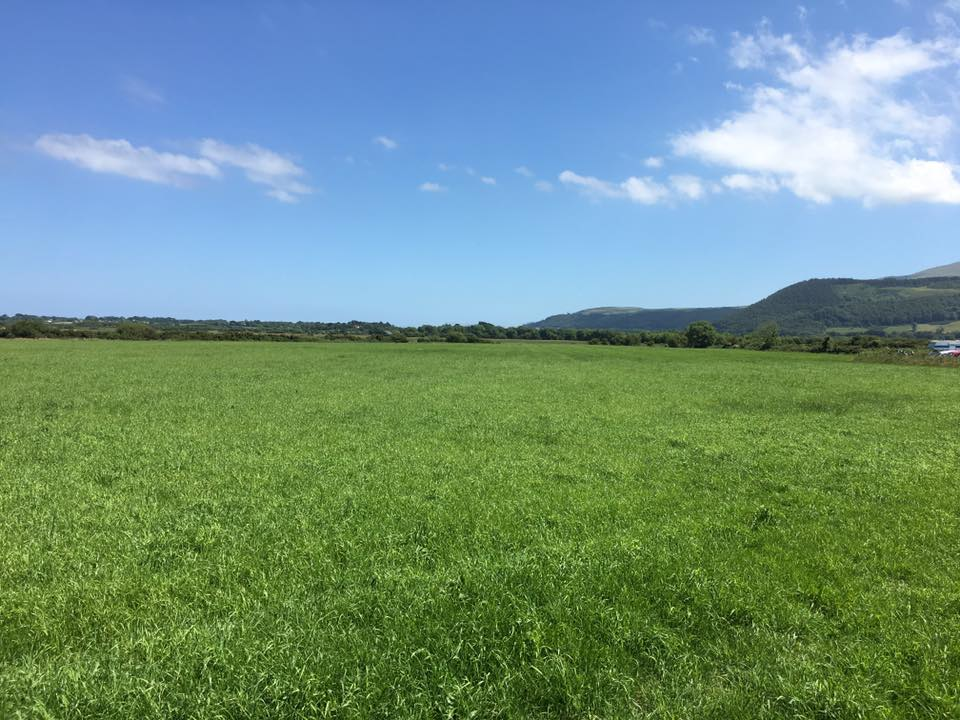
The take off and landing area looking eastwards towards Ramsey, June 2017

== Accidents and incidents ==
=== G-ACYL May 1936 ===
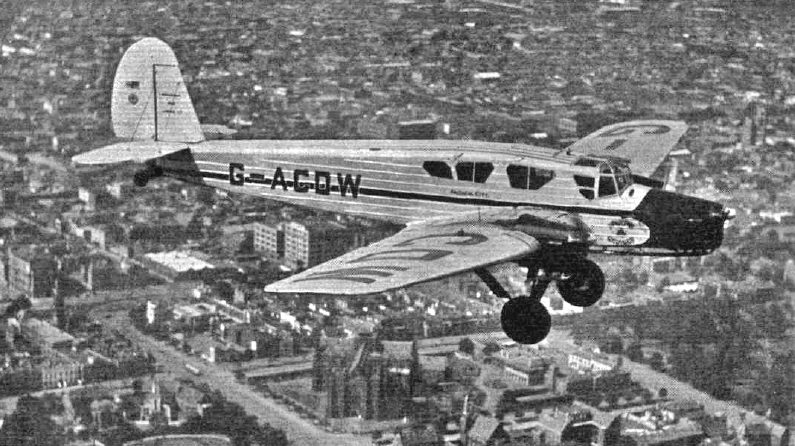
A Spartan Cruiser photographed over Melbourne circa 1934. It is identical to its sister G-ACYL, which was involved in an accident at Hall Caine Airport, 16 May 1936.

On Saturday 16 May 1936, British Airways Spartan Cruiser G-ACYL crashed on landing. Under the command of Capt. Elgey, the aircraft had departed Glasgow (Abbotsinch) on a scheduled service carrying five passengers. The landing surface at Hall Caine was reported as slippery after a period of torrential rain. Having made a safe landing the wheels of the aircraft locked as the brakes were applied, causing it to enter a skid. Heading towards a straight collision with a hangar, Capt. Elgey managed to turn away with the result that one of the aircraft's wings collided with the hangar, throwing it on its side and tearing the wing from the fuselage.

Only one passenger, a Mrs. Bridson of Renfrew, Glasgow, sustained a slight injury (a sprained wrist) however after receiving medical attention at a doctor's surgery in Ramsey she was able to continue to her destination, Port St Mary. Following the incident G-ACYL was repaired and returned to service.

== Notable passengers ==
- George Formby
- The Western Brothers
- Lady Bonham Carter
- Sir Mark Collet
- Marquis of Londonderry
