= St Ninian's High School, Douglas =

Coordinates: 54°09′52″N 4°29′04″W

St Ninian's High School

Location
- Ballaquayle Road; Douglas, IM2 5RA; Isle of Man

Information
- Type: Comprehensive
- Established: 1985
- Local authority: Isle of Man Offshore Establishments
- Department for Education URN: 132463 Tables
- Ofsted: Reports
- Headteacher: Chris Coole
- Gender: Coeducational
- Age: 11 to 18
- Enrolment: 1333
- Website: https://snhs.sch.im/

St Ninian's High School (Manx: Schoill Ard Noo Ninian) is a secondary school located in Douglas and Onchan, on the Isle of Man. The School is set over two different sites, catering for different year groups.

== History ==
The modern institution originated as a 1985 union of previously independent upper and lower schools. The lower dates to 1894, originally based at Park Road in central Douglas. The upper school, Douglas High School for Boys was founded in 1927 at Ballaquayle. Alumni of the high school formed the football club Douglas High School Old Boys A.F.C.

A review of secondary education in Douglas in 1985 formed St. Ninians, establishing a new name and uniting the two parts.

In 1998, staff member Alex Townsend developed the Manx Telecomputer Bus program, which saw the development of a mobile IT classroom. While primarily aimed at supporting primary schools, the computer bus facilitated a trip to London for St. Ninian's students in 1999.

A new location was established for the lower school in 2012- relocating to Bemahague, in Onchan. This was because the Park Road site was falling into disrepair and space for further expansion was limited. The upper school had also become crowded by this time, relying on several mobile classrooms. This necessitated the construction of a new school which could take Park Road's former students as well as one year group from the upper school.

== Facilities ==
The Upper School campus has received many renovations over its period of existence. It is now much larger than the original construction of the 1920s. Most recently a new Sixth form Centre was built in 2000. Named the Barbra Cottier Centre, it formed a purpose built centre for Sixth Form studies. In 2006 a new dining area and Special Needs centre was built on the site of a central courtyard.

The new lower school in Onchan has several tennis courts, playing fields, modern football pitches and a large gymnasium.

New lower school of St Ninian's High School in Onchan, shortly before the school opened in 2012

== Notable alumni ==
- Samantha Barks – Actress
- Martin Bridson – Whitehead Professor of Pure Mathematics, University of Oxford
- Harold Briley – BBC journalist and OBE
- Christine Collister – Award winning folk, blues and jazz singer-songwriter
- Peter Craine - Member of the House of Keys
- Adam Fogerty - Actor, former boxer and rugby league footballer.
- Oscar Garden - Trailblazing aviator who became known as the ‘Sundowner of the Skies’; being the fourth person to fly solo from England to Australia.
- Peter Kennaugh – Cyclist and Olympic gold medalist.
- Frank Kermode – literary critic and professor of English literature
- Charles Kerruish – First President of Tynwald
- Nigel Kneale – Best known for the creation of the character Professor Bernard Quatermass
- Paul Quine - Member of the House of Keys and Commercial Airline Pilot who was in command of the final Manx Airlines flight
