= Harold Briley =

British journalist (1931 – 2023)

Harold Briley OBE (March 20, 1931 – June 26, 2023) was a British journalist.

== Biography ==
Born in Anfield, Liverpool, Briley was the son of a cart wheel maker. He was educated at the Douglas High School for Boys in the Isle of Man. His family experienced evacuation during World War II.

Briley began his journalism career in 1948 with The Isle of Man Times before serving in the Royal Artillery. He reported for local newspapers on Manchester's local affairs and later worked for the Liverpool Post and Echo as a crime reporter.

In 1960, Briley joined the BBC as a writer for Today in Parliament and later became a war correspondent.

Briley's reporting covered the UN, the independence of Bangladesh, and the politics of Eastern Europe and Latin America. In 1982, he was the first to report on Argentina's invasion of the Falkland Islands. In 1983, he returned to the United Kingdom and later became the defence correspondent. He took retirement in 1990.

In recognition of his services to journalism, Briley was appointed OBE in 1991. He was also involved with the Falkland Islands Association, advocating for the self-determination of the islanders. Briley authored Fight for Falklands Freedom, which detailed the 1982 conflict and its aftermath.

== Bibliography ==
- Fight for Falklands Freedom (2022)
