= LPW Glider =

British single-seat glider, 1924

General information
- Type: Glider
- National origin: United Kingdom
- Designer: John Leeming
- Number built: 1

History
- First flight: 24 May 1924

The LPW Glider (or Leeming-Prince-Wood Glider) was a 1920s British glider built by John Leeming, Tom Prince and Clement Wood who later formed the Lancashire Aero Club.

== Development ==
In 1922 John Leeming designed a single-seat high-wing monoplane glider which he built from surplus Avro 504 components with the help of his friends Tom Prince and Avro workshop foreman Clement Wood. The glider flew on 24 May 1924 from Alexandra Park Aerodrome in Manchester being towed into the air by a car. In September 1924 while being flown by Leeming the glider stalled and crashed. The glider was rebuilt and had a motor-cycle engine fitted but it was not intended to fly, but for use as a ground trainer to allow students to practice taxiing.

== See also ==
Related lists

- List of gliders
