= Manchester (Wythenshawe) Aerodrome =

Former airport of Manchester, England, United Kingdom (1929–1930)

Coordinates: 53.4099°N 2.2801°W

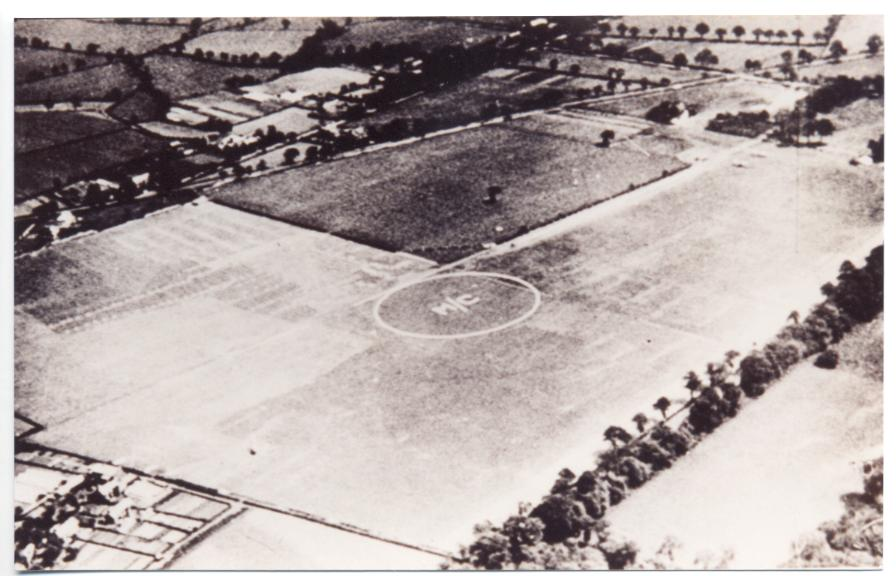
Wythenshawe Aerodrome in 1929 looking north-east. The small hangar is at top right. Wythenshawe Road slants down from centre right. 'M/C' in the middle of the airfield indicates 'Manchester' to pilots. The lane going across the top right corner is now Rackhouse Road.

Manchester (Wythenshawe) Aerodrome was the first airfield built to serve Manchester, England. It is now occupied by Rack House Primary School.

== History ==
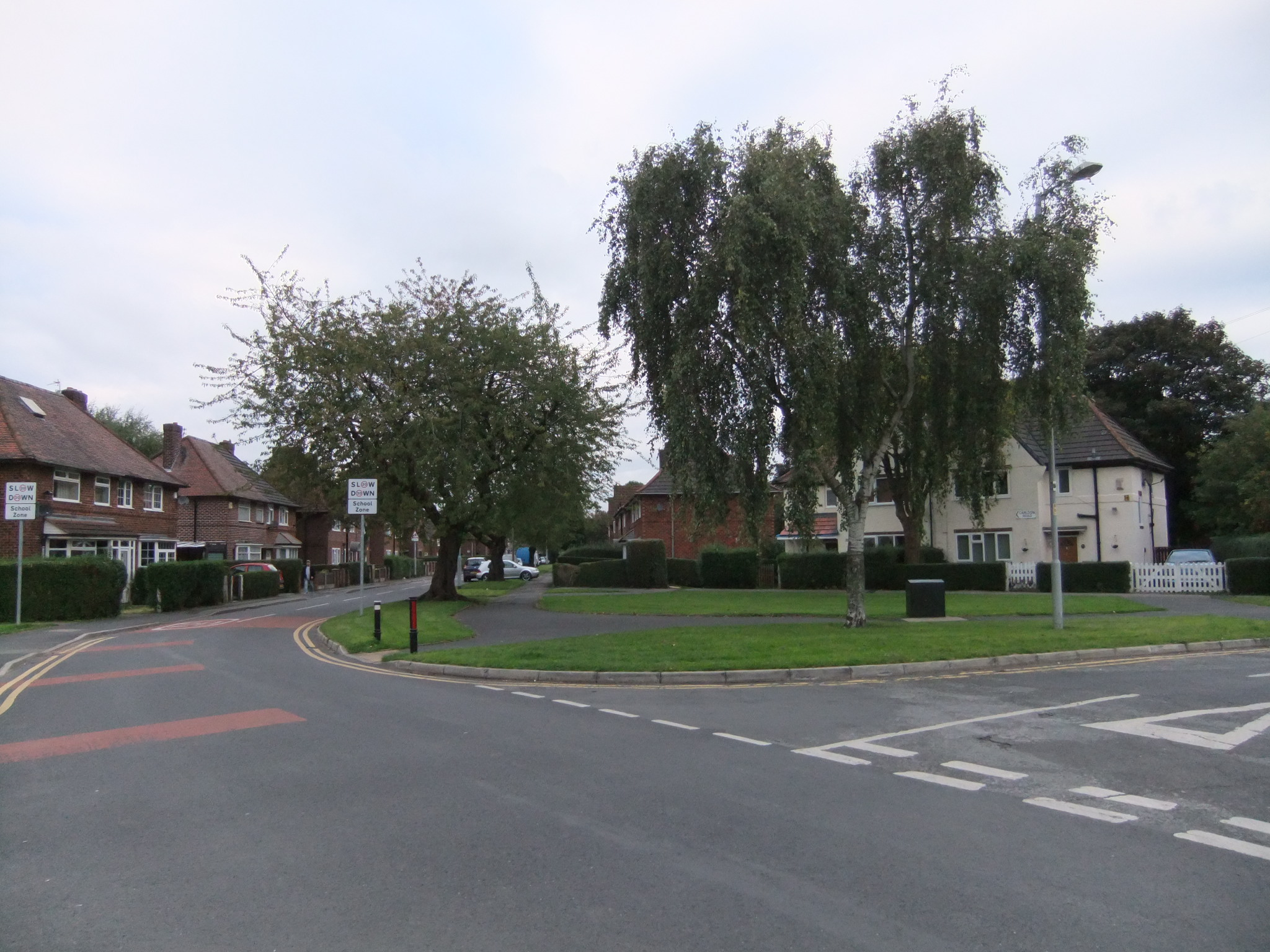
Street scene in Rackhouse area in Wythenshawe, 26 September 2010. No sign remains that there was an airport here.

- Mid-1920s: A campaign was inaugurated by interested aviation-minded people, including John Leeming and Sir Sefton Brancker, then the UK minister of civil aviation. Manchester's council began to realise that Manchester needed a permanent airport.
- 1926: Mr.Tatton (country squire at Wythenshawe Hall) sold much land in Wythenshawe, and it came into the hands of Manchester Corporation, which planned to build local authority housing on it.
- Early 1929: In that land, four fields at Rackhouse Farm in what is now Northern Moor were chosen to become Manchester's municipal aerodrome, until the new permanent Barton Airport near Eccles was built. The airfield's site was within the fork of Wythenshawe Road and Sale Road, west of the intersection with today's Princess Parkway and just north of Wythenshawe Park. Hedges were grubbed out, some ground was levelled, and a barn was converted into a hangar capable of housing one light aircraft. A country lane which is now Rackhouse Road ran along its east edge. A farmhouse became the administration building. Temporary fuel pumps were installed. The north-eastern field (seen dark-coloured on the adjacent photograph) was not made usable for aircraft operations. The only navigational help to pilots to identify the aerodrome were the letters 'M/C' in white, within a large circle. No airfield lighting or radio facilities were provided.
- 2 April 1929: First use of the airfield by an aircraft.
- 13 April 1929: Date of the city's application for an aerodrome licence. It called the place "Wythenshawe, in the parish of Northenden, in the rural district of Bucklow, in the County of Chester".
  The airfield was mainly used for private and club flying. Northern Air Lines (Manchester) Ltd based several aircraft here, their two-seat De Havilland DH.60 Moths being available for charter at one shilling per mile. The Lancashire Aero Club, based at Woodford Aerodrome, regularly sent one of their training aircraft to Wythenshawe, for the convenience of local members.
- 22 April 1929: The Lord Mayor of Manchester and a civic party flew from the aerodrome to Croydon Airport to collect Wythenshawe Aerodrome's temporary operating licence. The Air Ministry granted Wythenshawe an "all-purpose" licence, and Manchester became the first municipality in Great Britain to have its own airport.
- 22 June 1929: An 'Air Pageant' attracted many aircraft and large crowds of interested Mancunian spectators.
- 1 January 1930: The aerodrome became redundant as Barton Airport opened.
- 19 June 1930: The last recorded flight from Wythenshawe Airport.
- 1931: Manchester city's boundaries were extended southwards, and after that the site was in Manchester and Lancashire.
- Early 1930s and after: Manchester Corporation built houses over the area for social housing.
