= Blackpool Aviation Week 1909 =

1909 British air show

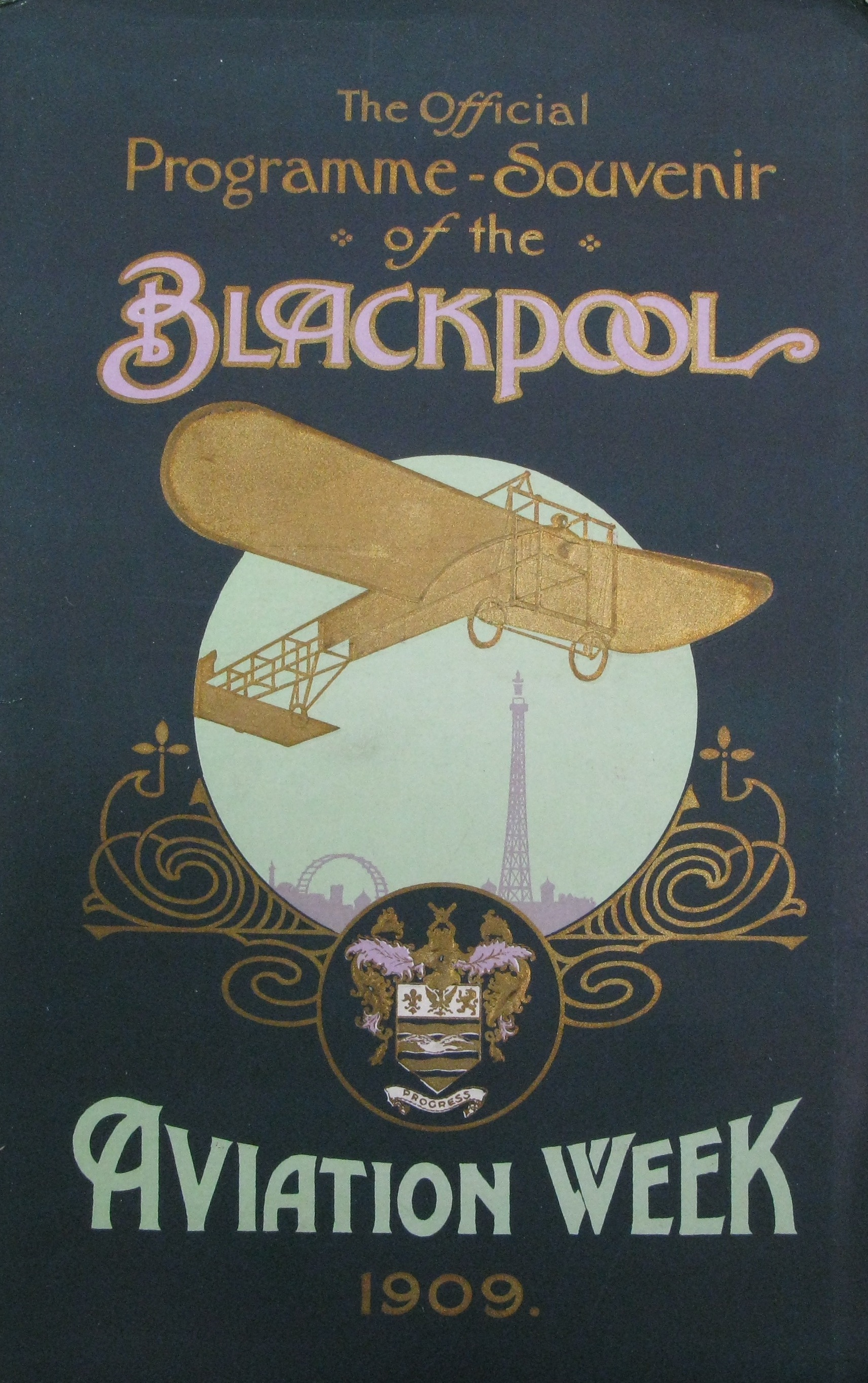
- The cover of the programme for the 1909 Blackpool Aviation Week
- Date: October 18–25, 1909
- Venue: Blackpool Airport
- Organised by: Lancashire Aero Club, Blackpool Corporation

The Blackpool Aviation Week (also known as the Blackpool Aviation Meeting) was an early British air show that took place in Blackpool in October 1909. It was recognised by the Aero Club of Great Britain making it Britain's first official air show. (Note: The first air show was held at Doncaster a few days before but was not recognised by the Aero Club of Great Britain, they were concerned that not enough aviators around to support both events)

== Creation of the show ==
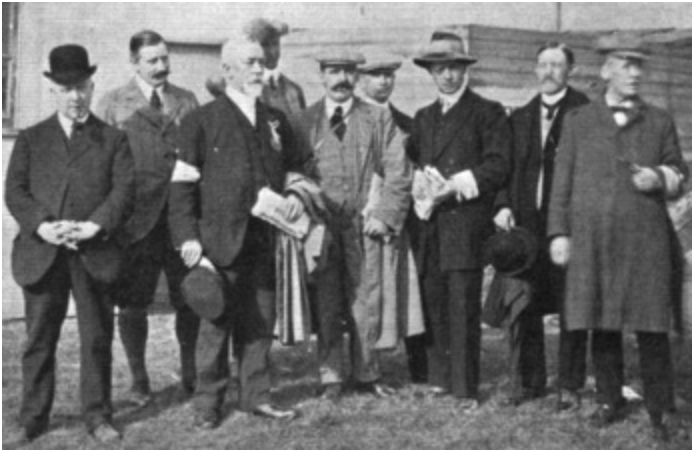
The organising committee of the Lancashire Aero Club at Blackpool in 1909

In the six years following the Wright Brothers's first powered flight aviation had spread across the world. France had become the centre of European flight. In July 1909, Louis Blériot became the first person to cross the English Channel in a powered aircraft. In August 1909, inspired by the accomplishments of the French, Lord Northcliffe, the owner of the Daily Mail wrote to the Blackpool Corporation suggesting they hold their own air show. The Mayor of Blackpool led a delegation to the Grande Semaine d'Aviation de la Champagne in Rheims and in early September the Corporation started planning for their own event. Over £6000 in prize funds was raised, primarily the Corporation, Lord Northcliffe and Sir Thomas Lipton.

In order to run the event, the Lancashire Aero Club was formed in August 1909. The club then leased land at Squires Gate from a local golf course about 2 miles (3.2 km) south of Blackpool. The golf course was converted over the course of six weeks; the Ministry of Labour paid for 200 unemployed men to build the course, complete with grandstands, a clubhouse and hangars. The site later became Blackpool Airport.

== The event ==
The club aimed to attract the leading airmen of the age. French pilots including Henri Farman, Louis Paulhan, Hubert Latham, Henri Rougier and Alfred Leblanc entered, as did British pioneer Alliott Verdon Roe.

=== 18 October ===
Around 60,000 spectators attended the first day of the event. The day was sunny with light breezes, which made for good conditions for flying. Roe made the first attempt at a flight, in a triplane of his own design, but he failed to take off. Farman was the first to fly at the event, completing half of the main circuit using "Gypaète" – a plane owned by Paulhan. At his second attempt Farman became the first pilot to complete a full circuit of the course; Paulhan then took over his aircraft plane and flew another lap.

Later in the day, Farman flew seven laps at a maximum recorded speed of 60 kilometres per hour (37 mph). Rougier recorded the day's longest flight at nine laps – a distance of 28.8 kilometres (17.9 mi) – in his Voisin aircraft. Leblanc flew one lap in his Blériot Aéronautique aircraft.

=== 19 October ===
The second day of the week suffered from higher winds which increased during the day. The first flight was by Latham, who crashed his Antoinette after half a lap. Roe managed two short flights in the early afternoon, followed by Paulhan who completed eight laps of the course in difficult conditions.

=== 20 October ===
Mortimer Singer attempted a flight in his Voisin around noon on the third day, but failed to take off, as did Blackpool Councillor A. Parkinson in his Blériot aircraft. Farman then took off, and completed 24 laps of the course before cramp caused him to land. He had flown 47.7 miles (76.8 km) in 1 hour 32 minutes, recording the longest flight of the week.

=== 21, 22 and 23 October ===
No flying took place on Thursday, 21 October due to high winds. Friday morning saw further wind, but Latham managed two complete laps in his repaired Antoinette in the afternoon. Heavy rain on Saturday 23 October meant that Latham's was the last flight of the originally scheduled Week.

=== 25 October ===
Because several days had been lost during the official Week, the organising committee decided to extend the event on the following Monday and Tuesday. Monday 25 October saw further wind and rain, and the extended event was officially canceled. However, the afternoon saw enough improvement in the weather that several pilots attempted flight, though only Roe was able to take off, and he only managed a short flight of about 50 yards (46 m).

== Prizes ==
The Manchester Guardian newspaper offered a cup and £100 for the slowest complete circuit of the course won by Latham for a lap at 21.65 miles per hour (34.84 km/h).

Michelin gave £1000 towards the prize for the longest distance travelled, the total amount being £2000. This was won by Farman. Farman also won the £400 Daily Sketch prize for highest speed over any three laps, and the Daily Mail £1000 prize for the fastest lap.

== Bibliography ==
- Aspin, Chris (1987). Dizzy Heights – The Story of Lancashire's First Flying Men. ISBN 978-0-906881-04-0.
