= Graham Hoete =

New Zealand artist

Graham Hoete, also known as Mr G, is a street artist who specialises in photo-realistic murals. His most famous murals include that of Prince in Prince's hometown Minneapolis, and of Steven Adams in Oklahoma City.

== Life ==
Hoete was born in 1979 on Mōtītī island in the Bay of Plenty. He is of Ngāi Te Rangi, Ngāti Ranginui and Ngāti Awa descent.

He was introduced to spray paint graffiti from Charles Williams.

His creative career began in Sydney where he worked as a graphic designer for seven years. His first commissioned artworks were of clients' dogs, which earned him enough income to begin to pursue his art career full time. Through social media and the sharing of his artworks Hoete was able to pick up bigger clients including Ice-T and Coco Austin.

In 2016, after the passing of Prince, Hoete was moved to paint a mural in the singer's honour. His Sydney mural went viral leading to a request from Prince's hometown for another mural in Minneapolis. He was subsequently invited to Prince's memorial by Prince's brother.

While in the United States Hoete decided to pay homage to New Zealand basketball player Steve Adams and traveled to Oklahoma City where he was able to create a mural near the stadium where Adams plays.

Hoete painted a mural of his ancestor, John Alfred Borrowdale Murray, in Moffat Scotlate where Murray heralded from. The mural was painted on the oldest building in the village.

In New Zealand his murals include that of film maker Merata Mita in Rotorua and of his father on Motiti Island.

Outside of murals Hoete's portraiture was exhibited in Tauranaga Art Gallery in 2019 in an exhibition titled 'Home'.
