= Manchester Barton Aerodrome =

Airport in Salford, Greater Manchester, England

Manchester Barton Aerodrome Salford/Barton Aerodrome

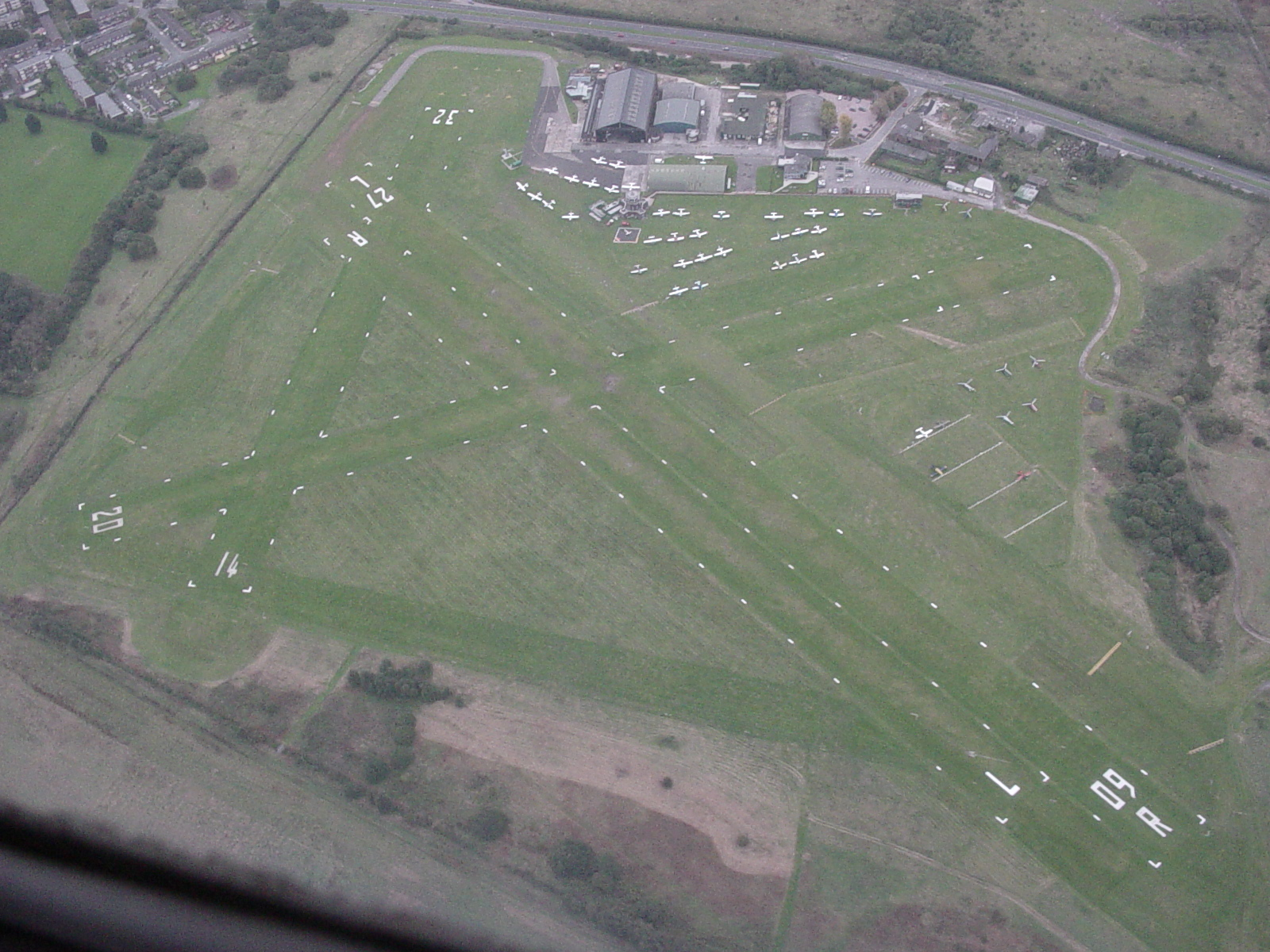
- IATA: none; ICAO: EGCB

Summary
- Airport type: Public
- Owner: Peel Holdings Ltd
- Operator: City Airport Ltd
- Serves: Manchester/Salford
- Location: Barton-upon-Irwell, Greater Manchester, England
- Opened: 1 January 1930; 96 years ago
- Elevation AMSL: 73 ft (22 m)
- Coordinates: 53°28′18″N 002°23′23″W
- Website: www.bartonaerodrome.co.uk

Map
- Location in Greater Manchester

Runways
Direction	Length		Surface
Direction	m	ft	Surface
08R/26L	625	2,051	Grass
08L/26R	641	2,103	Grass
02/20	533	1,749	Grass
14/32	398	1,306	Grass
- Sources: UK AIP at NATS

Barton Aerodrome (ICAO: EGCB) is an airport in Barton-upon-Irwell, Salford, Greater Manchester, England, 5 nautical miles (9.3 km; 5.8 mi) west of Manchester. Formerly known as City Airport and City Airport Manchester, it is known by the Civil Aviation Authority (CAA) as Manchester/Barton and rebranded as Manchester Barton Aerodrome on 3rd April 2023.

The United Kingdom's first purpose-built municipal airport, it has four grass runways. The airfield operates Tuesday–Sunday, from 9 am until 6 pm, or sunset (whichever earlier) for fixed-wing aircraft. Commercial, private, military, police and air ambulance helicopters can operate in the hours of darkness by arrangement.

The airport serves as an important reliever airport for Manchester Airport. It is also used as a refuelling stop for light aircraft and helicopters. It lies on the edge of Chat Moss and the aircraft movements area suffers from occasional periods of waterlogging, restricting fixed wing operations. Works to improve drainage on the airfield have seen some success in reducing the number of closures. It has a CAA Ordinary Licence (Number P886) that allows flights for the public transport of passengers or for flying instruction as authorised by the licensee, City Airport Limited. The aerodrome is not licensed for night use.

== History ==
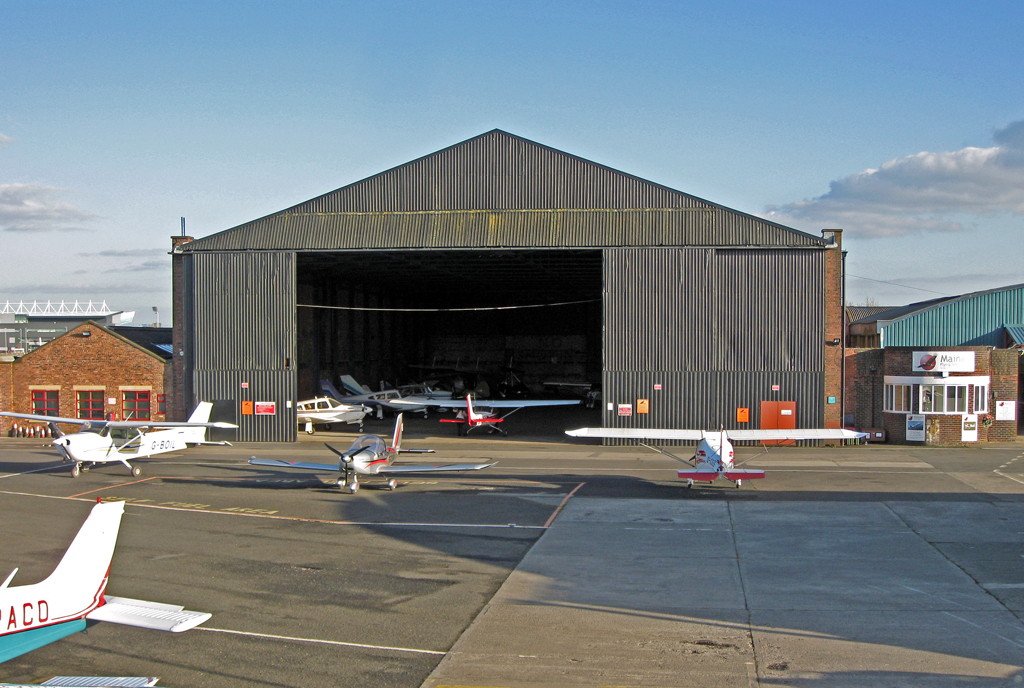
A 2015 view of the main hangar which was completed during January 1930

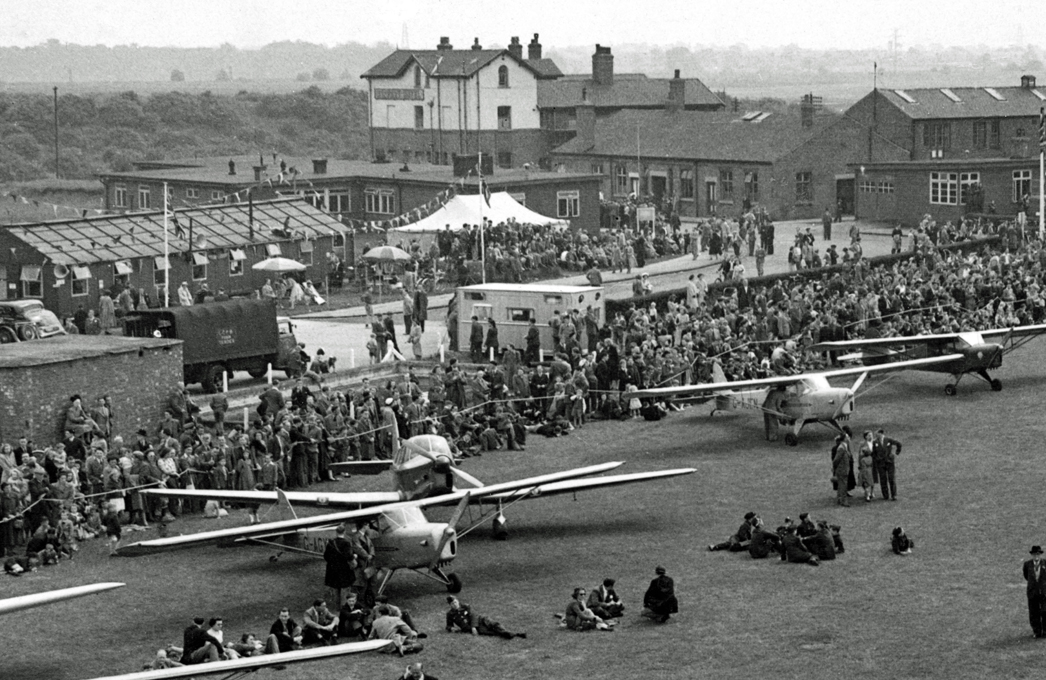
1951 view of Barton Aerodrome's 1930s buildings including the Airport Hotel and farm buildings converted for passenger use. Also wartime temporary structures, now demolished

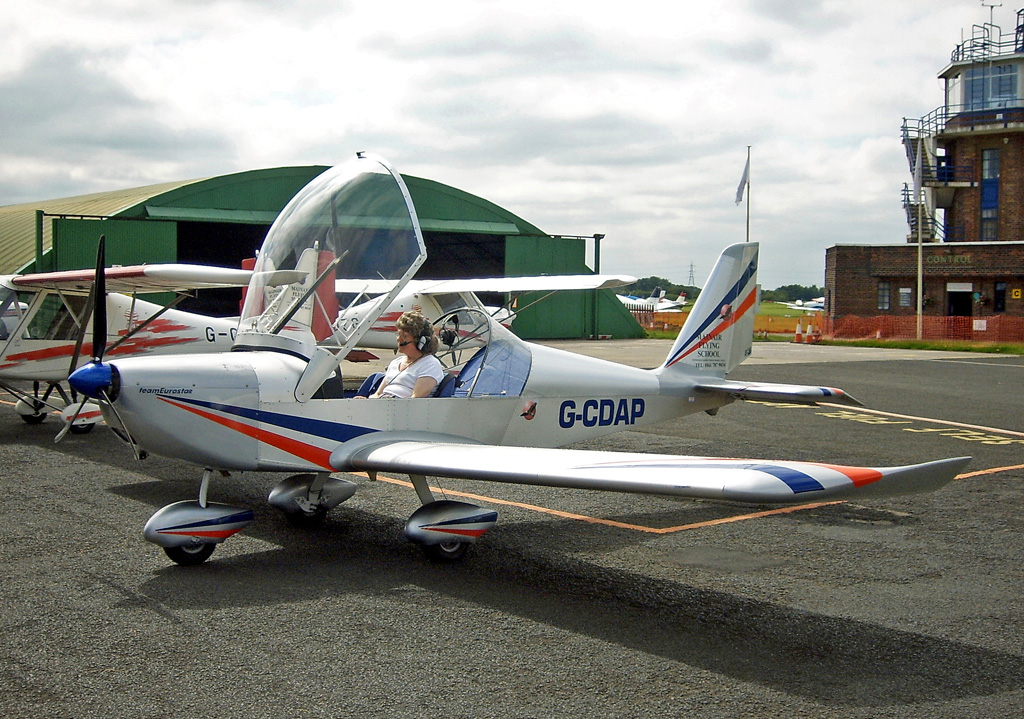
A light aircraft prepares to depart from Barton with the 1932-built control tower at right and a postwar hangar at left

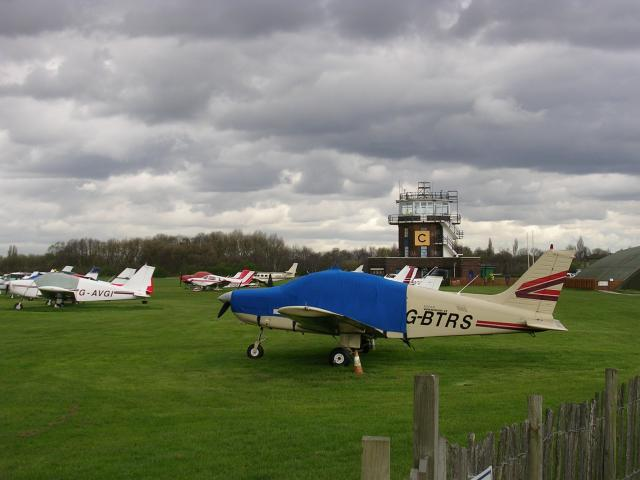
An aircraft parking area at City Airport in front of the control tower

- Autumn 1928: Construction of Manchester's new municipal aerodrome at Barton, near Eccles started, to replace the temporary Manchester (Wythenshawe) Aerodrome.
- January 1930: The grass airfield and large hangar were completed. The first passenger charter flight occurred. Barton was managed until 1933 by Northern Air Lines, who based several Avro 504s and other types for training, club and charter flights.
- Summer 1930: Imperial Airways operated a thrice-weekly scheduled service to London's Croydon Airport via Castle Bromwich Aerodrome, Birmingham, subsidised by the councils of Manchester, Liverpool and Birmingham. This service was timed to fly north from Croydon in the evening and to return south next morning, in order to provide connections to and from European airports from Croydon.
- Spring 1933: A control tower and associated wireless station were completed, the first at a municipal airport outside London, and able to communicate with aircraft in flight and give pilots bearings from the airfield. The tower is still operational and is believed to be the oldest in Europe still in use for its original purpose.
- August 1934: Scheduled services resumed. Croydon-based Railway Air Services commenced a Croydon-Barton-Belfast-Glasgow route.
- Spring 1935: Linking services to Liverpool, Blackpool and the Isle of Man were introduced. Other smaller airlines, including Isle of Man Air Services operated services from Barton.
- June 1938: All schedules were transferred to the newly completed larger Ringway Airport (which between 1940 and 1957 also accommodated RAF Ringway).
- World War II: Barton was requisitioned and used for military aircraft repair and overhaul, carried out by civilian firms including Air Taxis Ltd and David Rosenfield Ltd. Aircraft types involved were Avro Ansons, Dominies, Fairey Battles, Fairey Fulmars, Hawker Hurricanes and F4U Corsairs, followed by the scrapping of Fairey Swordfish. Over 700 Percival Proctor training and communications aircraft were assembled and tested at Barton by F. Hills & Sons of Trafford Park. There is a wartime concrete air raid bunker still at the site hidden under overgrown vegetation near the main road (A57).
- 1940–1942: The sole wartime scheduled air service from Ireland to the UK occasionally used Barton from 1940 to 1942, operated from Dublin by Aer Lingus and West Coast Air Services. Aer Lingus often used their Douglas DC-3, the heaviest airliner type to serve Barton on a timetabled route. This was the last scheduled service though the airfield.
- 1946: Lancashire Aero Club moved from Woodford Aerodrome to Barton and remain based there until 2007.
- 1946 to 1953: Manchester University Air Squadron (MUAS) was based in one of the wartime-built western hangars. In 1953 the unit moved to RAF Woodvale near Southport, Lancashire. MUAS had flown Tiger Moth and Chipmunk trainers.
- 1 October 1948 to 31 March 1953: No.2 Reserve Flying School, also flying Tiger Moths and Chipmunks, was based at Barton and gave primary flight training to volunteers, who would later serve in the Royal Air Force. The unit used the same facilities as MUAS. On 31 March 1953 the unit closed.
- 21 July 1996: The last known airworthy de Havilland Mosquito, G-ASKH, a Trainer Mk III built by de Havilland at Leavesden in early 1945 (serial number RR299) and owned by Hawker Siddeley based at Hawarden, crashed with the loss of both crew after suffering engine power loss when performing a wing-over manoeuvre during the Barton Aerodrome air show.
- 2003: Manchester Ship Canal Developments, (of which Peel Holdings Group is the majority shareholder), bought the land, hangars and other buildings from Manchester City Council.
- November 2003 : Peel Investments (North) Limited submit an initial planning application, requesting permission to build the Western Gateway Infrastructure Scheme (WGIS) to the south of the A57 road, opposite the airfield (see Port Salford). One feature of the proposal is a new rail spur running along the eastern boundary of the airfield.
- May 2004 : Initial consultations with parties likely to be affected by WGIS.
- 2006: The control tower underwent a major programme of rebuilding and refurbishment.
- 2007: Lancashire Aero Club left the airfield after a dispute with Peel Holdings.
- 2010: City Airport Ltd no longer part of Peel Airports. Airfield Management Company now fully part of Peel Holdings.
- 2010: The Original Hangar (known as The Pemberton Hangar), a Grade II listed building, long used as a warehouse for timber and sheet walling materials, underwent a full refurbishment.
- 2011: Former University of Manchester building converted into a new helicopter facility, branded as City Heliport. Peel established Cardinal Helicopter Services, a helicopter charter company operating from the Heliport with a Sikorski S.76C++ Helicopter.
- 2011: The 'Clubhouse' building which houses the Airfield Cafe/Bar is fully refurbished and relaunched as 'The Airfield Lodge' with new management and longer opening hours.
- Jan 2015: The Airfield Cafe/Bar is taken over by City Airport Ltd and renamed as 'Runway 26' with the aim of re-developing the facility to cater for the wider requirements of pilots, visitors and the general public.
- Dec 2020: Former University of Manchester (Fluid Dynamics Research Laboratory) building, by the main entrance, is completely refurbished internally to be used as a bespoke Ambulance operations base by Mersey Medical Services Ltd, a private medical company, who now operate from this base 24hrs a day. The building has been named Harrison House in honour of Dr. Reginald Harrison credited with being the founder of the modern day Ambulance service in the U.K.

Barton Aerodrome has changed little since its opening, and is considered a good example of the airfields of the 1930s. There are several historical items of note at Barton. The control tower is protected by its grade II listed building status, along with the original terminal building and hangar.

- April 2023: The airport rebrands from City Airport to Manchester Barton Aerodrome, reflecting its historical links and common aviation name.

The airfield is regularly used as a setting for films and TV programmes, amongst them "Brass" (where Barton masqueraded as Croydon Airport), Mersey Beat, GBH and Island at War. The distinctive control tower often features prominently in the making of such programmes and films.

Use of Barton Aerodrome by heavier aircraft is hampered by the soft peaty nature of the area, being at the edge of Chat Moss, and by the low-lying land and areas of nearby standing water encouraging fog. It would have needed much heavy work consolidating the ground (compare the struggle building the Liverpool and Manchester Railway across Chat Moss in 1826). During 2010–2011, additional drainage was added to improve surface water draining, due to the original clay pipes deteriorating and no longer functioning.

== Emergency services ==
Both the National Police Air Service (NPAS) and the North West Air Ambulance (NWAA) base helicopters at the airfield.

NPAS is active 24 hours a day, 365 days a year. It operates a Eurocopter EC135.

NWAA is a registered charity providing a helicopter emergency medical service (HEMS) covering Lancashire, Greater Manchester, Cheshire, Merseyside and Cumbria. It has two EC135 helicopters based primarily to serve Greater Manchester, South Lancashire, Cheshire and Merseyside. They operate during daylight hours only. The charity also has a third helicopter based at Blackpool Airport.

== Manchester Heliport ==
In 2011, the airport opened its new 'Manchester Heliport' facility, aimed at the commercial helicopter charter market, expanding and complementing the existing services provided at the Airport. The heliport features a dedicated jet A1 fuel facility, conference room, small office units and a dedicated passenger lounge. City Heliport (which is not licensed) can accept helicopters during the hours of darkness by arrangement. This facility is used particularly during football matches at nearby Old Trafford, (Manchester United) and City of Manchester Stadium (Manchester City). The airport is also an operating base for the North West Air Ambulance, and the Greater Manchester Police Helicopter, both using the Airport 24 hours a day, using portable lighting which is placed on the runway during hours of darkness.

== Rescue and fire fighting ==
Barton operates a Category 1 Rescue and Fire Fighting service with a Land Rover Defender 130 fire tender equipped to CAA Category 2 standard, and a Toyota Hilux Double Cab as a fire tender equipped with 80 imp gal (360 L; 96 US gal) of foam/water mix.
