= Woodford Aerodrome =

Former airport and aircraft factory in the United Kingdom

Woodford Aerodrome Manchester Woodford Aerodrome
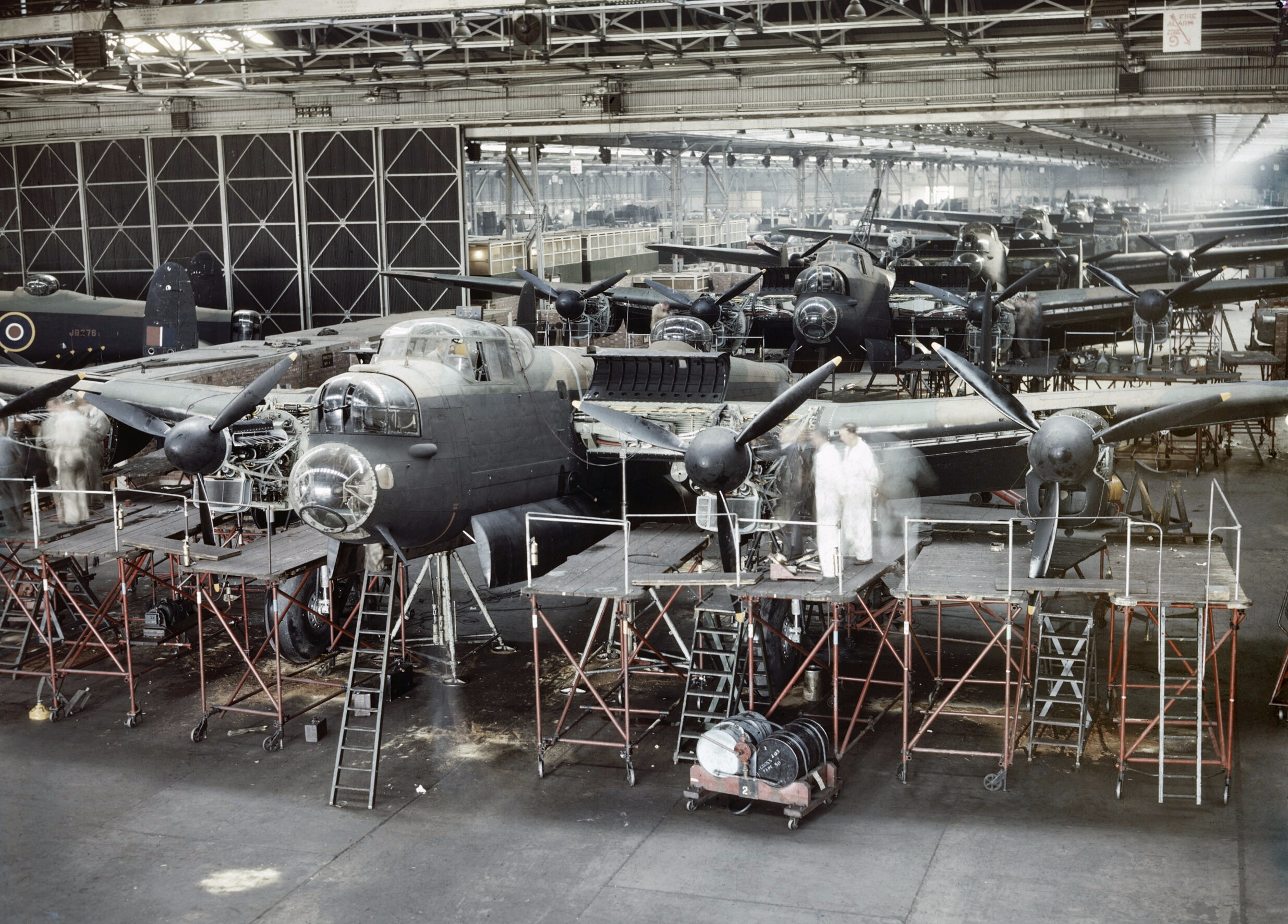
- Avro Lancaster assembly line, 1943
- IATA: none; ICAO: EGCD

Summary
- Airport type: Private
- Operator: BAE Systems
- Location: Woodford, Greater Manchester, England
- Elevation AMSL: 295 ft (90 m)
- Coordinates: 53°20′17″N 002°08′56″W

Map
- Location in Greater Manchester

Runways
Direction	Length		Surface
Direction	m	ft	Surface
07/25	2,292	7,520	Asphalt

View across the aerodrome in 2015

Woodford Aerodrome (ICAO: EGCD) is a former airfield and aircraft factory at Woodford, Greater Manchester, England, 6 nautical miles (11 km; 6.9 mi) north of Macclesfield. It was opened by the Avro company after the First World War and became an important production centre for military aircraft in the Second World War. Notable planes made at the factory include the Avro Anson, Avro Lancaster, Avro Shackleton and Avro Vulcan.

After almost 80 years of aircraft manufacture at the site, Woodford was closed and sold off by BAE Systems in 2011.

== History ==
=== Pre-war ===
The aerodrome opened in 1924 when successful aviation pioneer Alliott Verdon-Roe bought the original farmland to enable his Avro company to move its aeroplane assembly and test flying facilities from Alexandra Park Aerodrome in south Manchester. Originally it had a small grass landing area with several temporary Bessonneau hangars. The Lancashire Aero Club also used the aerodrome briefly in the 1920s until moving to the new Barton Aerodrome and used a converted farm building as a clubhouse and a 'Dutch barn' style steel-framed hangar built for A V Roe around 1927.

By the late 1930s, the aerodrome was upgraded with the construction of concrete runways; the main runway was also extended to the east. Increased factory space, particularly at the northern edge of the aerodrome next to Woodford village, was constructed to allow vast expansion of aircraft production. During the Second World War, the Avro Lancaster was constructed at the site.

=== Post war ===
In 1945, Hawker-Siddeley bought into Avro Canada. Avro continued to be operating name at Woodford but it was actually a subsidiary of the Hawker Siddeley Group and used only for trading purposes. When the company was absorbed into Hawker Siddeley Aviation in July 1963, the Avro name ceased to be used.

On 29 April 1977, Woodford was taken over by British Aerospace. It was formed as a result of the Aircraft and Shipbuilding Industries Act 1977 (c. 3) when Hawker Siddeley Aviation and Dynamics were nationalised and merged with British Aircraft Corporation (BAC) and Scottish Aviation.

=== Final years ===
Woodford became part of BAE Systems as a result of the £7.7 billion merger of British Aerospace (BAe) and Marconi Electronic Systems (MES) in November 1999. The aerodrome and factory became known as BAE Systems Woodford until it was sold in late 2011. The site was due to close anyway in 2012 when its Nimrod project was to be completed but in late 2010 the Woodford-built BAE Nimrod MRA4 project was cancelled. It was previously believed that some jobs would be transferred to BAE Systems' Military Air Solutions headquarters in Preston, Lancashire. However, following the cancellation of aircraft orders in the British Government's Strategic Defence and Security Review, the site closed as an active airfield on 25 August 2011.

On 20 December 2011, the site was purchased for £100 million by Jo Bamford, the heir to the JCB fortune. A new housing estate called Woodford Garden Village was constructed on the site.

The Avro Heritage Museum now occupies the former aerodrome fire station.

== Aircraft types ==
Many aircraft types have been built at Woodford, apart from the BAe 146, also first flown at Woodford including:

- Avro Anson
- Avro Lancaster
- Avro Lincoln
- Avro Tudor
- Avro Shackleton
- Avro 707
- Avro Vulcan
- Avro Ashton
- Hawker Siddeley HS 748
- Hawker Siddeley Nimrod
- BAe ATP
- BAe 146
