= History of Manchester Airport =

Coordinates: 53°21′14″N 002°16′30″W

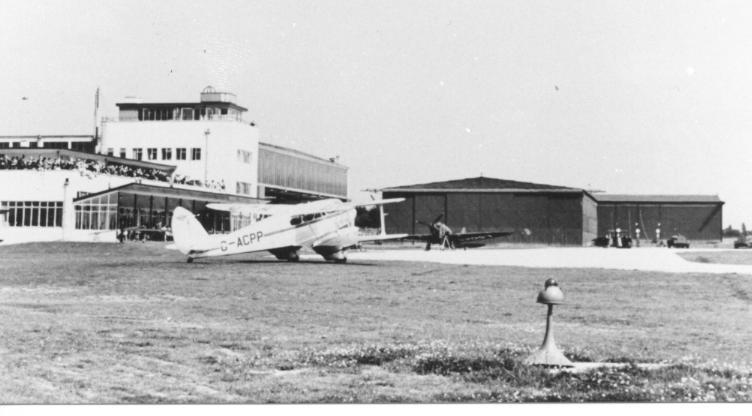
Ringway Airport in September 1939. Pictured are the terminal building and control tower (= hangar 1), and hangars 2 and 3 (in order from left) with a De Havilland Dragon Rapide of Great Western and Southern Airlines. Image taken from a little south of west. (After World War II they were renumbered 2,3,4.)

The origins of Manchester Airport in England, UK, date back to the 1930s. Construction started on Ringway on 28 November 1935 and it opened partly in June 1937 and completely on 25 June 1938, in Ringway parish north of Wilmslow, from which it derived its original name Manchester (Ringway) Airport. Its north border was Yewtree Lane. Its southeast border was a little northwest of Altrincham Road (Styal).

- Local roads relevant to this account, on the map below:
  - Yewtree Lane: the lane from the junction by Firtree Farm west to The Grange (east of the crossroads marked "Ringway"), and continuing northwest past Manor Farm to the next junction.
  - Altrincham Road (Styal): the lane from Oversleyford running northeast then east into the Styal area.

In World War II, it was the location of RAF Ringway, and was important in the production and repair of military aircraft and training parachutists.

After World War II, it gradually expanded to its present size, including massive expansion of aprons, runways, and car parking areas. Among the first expansions were car parking and service buildings north of Yewtree Lane.

From 1958 to late 1962, Terminal 1 was built: this was the first of Ringway's modern large terminals and the first major public building north of Yewtree Lane.

In 1997, the second runway was planned and construction on it started, with protests about it intruding on woodland in the Styal area.

== Local airfield history ==
Manchester, England, has been served since 1911 by the following airfields:

- Trafford Park Aerodrome, in operation 1911–18, owned by a company. Now built-over.
- Alexandra Park Aerodrome, in operation 1918–24, built on land owned by the Egerton Estate between Didsbury and Chorlton-cum-Hardy. Now playing fields and built-over.
- Woodford Aerodrome, owned by A.V.Roe in NE Cheshire, from 1924.
- Wythenshawe Aerodrome, the first municipally owned airport at Manchester, 1929–1930. Now built-over.
- City Airport Manchester originally and still known as Barton Aerodrome, from January 1930.
- Manchester Airport, formerly known as Ringway: described here.

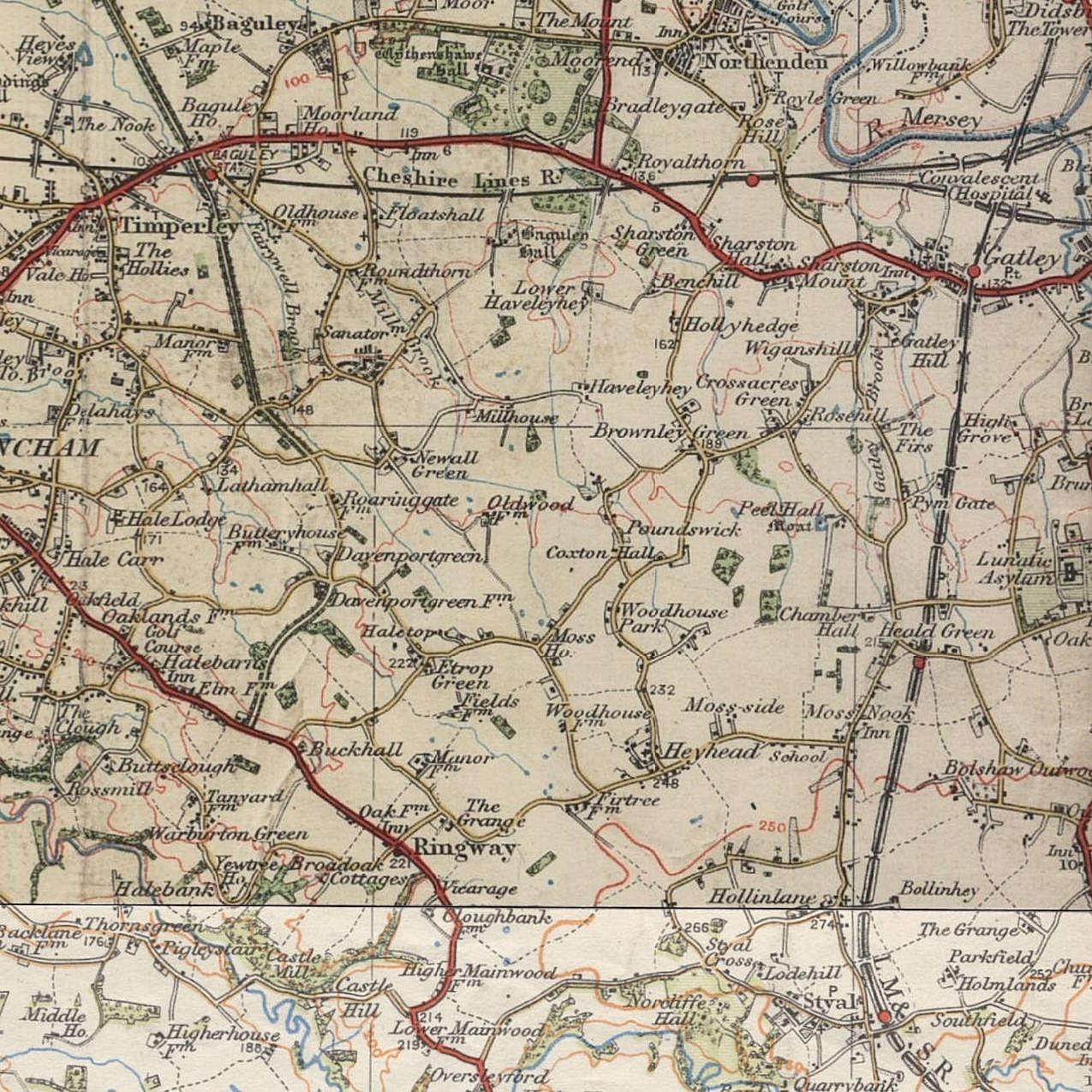
Area where Manchester Airport and Wythenshawe are now, as around 1925

== Origins of Manchester Airport ==
- For history of Ringway before the airport started, see Ringway, Manchester.
- Mid 1934: Manchester Airport's present site was chosen to build an airfield, as Barton Aerodrome was considered unsuitable for larger aircraft.
- 25 July 1934: Manchester City Council voted narrowly in favour of the Ringway site as the city's new airport. The site for the planned airport was at the time in the Cheshire parish of Ringway (as it was south of the River Mersey). Its north border was Yewtree Lane. Its southeast border was a little northwest of Altrincham Road (Styal).
- 28 November 1935: Construction was ceremonially started by the Lord Mayor.
- 17 May 1937: The first aeroplane landed at Ringway, which was partly built and all grass: a de Havilland Hornet Moth G-ADND, flown by Duncan Menzies, a Fairey Aviation test pilot, was over where Wythenshawe is now and intended to land at Barton Aerodrome, but could not find Sale and the Manchester Ship Canal (landmarks on the way to Barton) because of fog, so he landed at another airfield (Ringway, then incomplete) which he saw.
- 8 June 1937: The first (westerly) part of the airfield, with an assembly hangar designed by the Manchester City Architect George Noel Hill, was officially opened for use by Fairey Aviation.
- Early summer 1938: The airport was completed for civil aviation use.
- 25 June 1938: The airport and its terminal building were officially opened with a public air display that included civil and RAF aircraft and on 27 June handled its first scheduled flight, a KLM operated Douglas DC-2 to Amsterdam. The airport at this time was called Ringway, after the parish it was within. Pre-war, KLM was the only international operator out of Ringway and offered a request stop at Doncaster. The terminal building was the westernmost of the large buildings and incorporated the control tower, administration, restaurant, and hangar: it was later numbered Hangar 1.
- 1938: 4,000 passengers used the airport.
- January–August 1939: 4,000 passengers used the airport, before declaration of war brought an end to civil operations.

== World War II ==
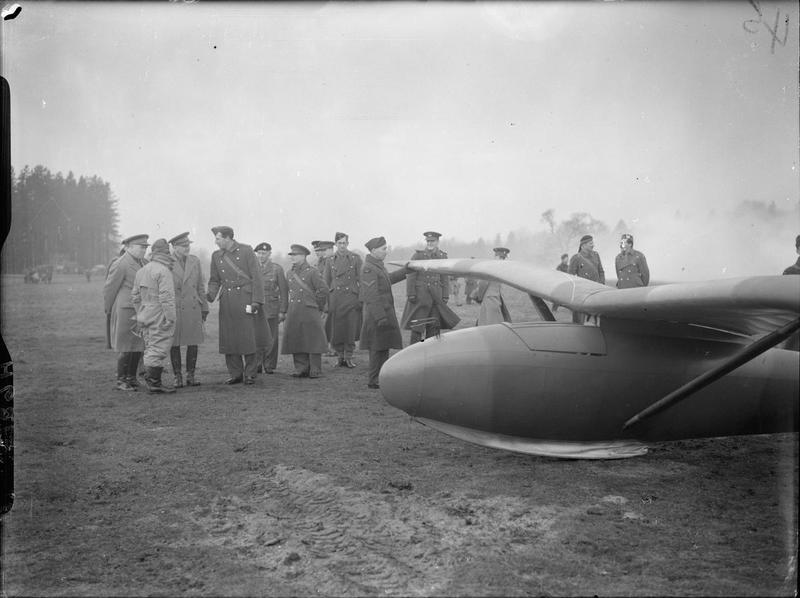
General Sir John Dill, Chief of the Imperial General Staff inspects gliders at the Central Landing Establishment at RAF Ringway, December 1940.

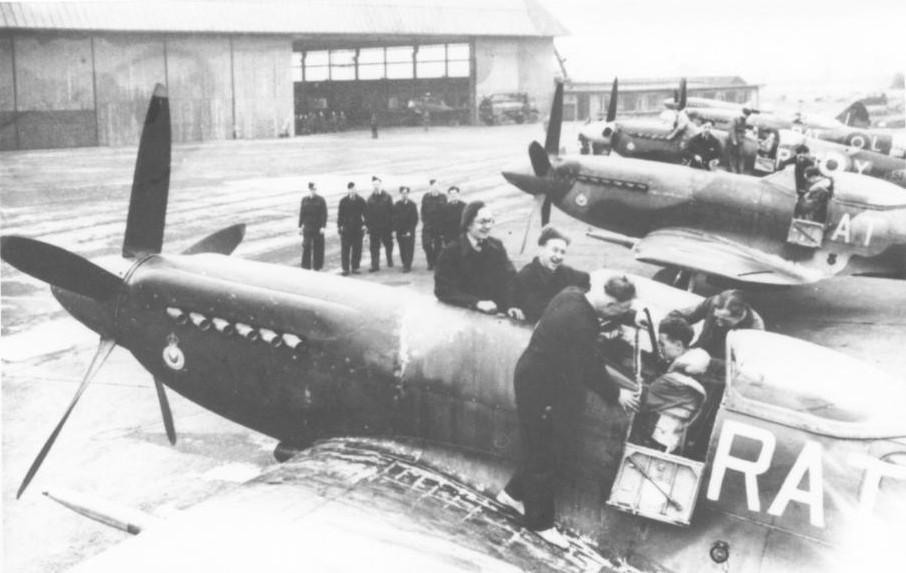
No. 613 Squadron RAF Spitfires at RAF Ringway in 1947

- 1939: Construction of the Royal Air Force station RAF Ringway began on the northeast edge of the airfield. It was used for operational flying and training. The main user was No.1 Parachute Training School RAF which trained over 60,000 paratroopers between June 1940 and March 1946. The trainees parachuted over Tatton Park, after receiving permission from the land owner, Lord Egerton. A complex of hangars and assembly sheds on the northwest side of the airfield was used by Fairey Aviation to build, modify and test over 4,000 aircraft. From spring 1939, Avro used the 1938-built main hangar (former passenger terminal) for assembly and testing the prototype Avro Manchester, Avro Lancaster and Avro Lincoln bombers.
- 1939: No. 613 (City of Manchester Squadron) had its home base at RAF Ringway.
- Late 1939: Fairey built two temporary south-side hangars (numbered 6 and 7) along Altrincham Road (Styal) to store completed Fairey Battle aircraft.
- 1939-1940: Two hangars were built in the northwest corner of the airfield for use by Fairey Aviation. They still exist, one used for aircraft maintenance and the other for ground operations.
- Winter 1940-1941: The advent of heavier aircraft types resulted in the all-grass landing area being badly damaged in wet weather. The ruts froze during cold weather, damaging the undercarriages of taxiing aircraft.
- June–December 1941: Two asphalt runways of 3,000 ft (910 m) length were therefore hastily laid down. The runways were designated 06/24 and 10/28.
- 1941 or earlier: The hangars were given their first numbering system.
- Late 1942: The temporary south-side hangars 6 and 7 were removed.
- 1942/1943: Three large permanent southside hangars (numbered 521, 522, 523) were built to Ministry of Aircraft Production designs and used for the assembly of Avro York military transport aircraft along the northwest side of Altrincham Road (Styal). (After the war they were used for various purposes including overhaul of Canadair Sabres by Airwork Ltd, by private pilot owners and a flying school. In the mid-1990s Runway 2 obliterated them.)
- January 1943: By then Runway 06/24 was lengthened to 4,200 ft (1,300 m) to accommodate the four-engined aircraft using RAF Ringway and the 3,300 ft (1,000 m) Runway 02/20 was constructed. Runways 02/20 and 10/28 ceased to be used by airliners by the mid-1950s, but 10/28 was used by light aircraft for another 30 years. Both are permanently out of use.
- 1943: Another north-side hangar (later number 5) was built for the Parachute Training School for ground training. At some time after this, the hangars were renumbered.

In World War II, aircraft dispersal and work areas with hard standings were built outside the old airfield area: north of Yewtree Lane by Fairey's area, and southeast of Altrincham Road (Styal) by the three southeast hangars. These were linked to by "level crossings" across those two roads, which were closed to the public except to those with a local resident's pass from early 1940 to mid-1945. After the war, these hard standings were removed and the land was returned to farming, and the two roads became public again.

== Airfield buildings as at end of World War II ==
At the end of the war, the airfield had these buildings (in the pairs of hangar numbers, the first number is the hangar's original number and the second is its later renumbering):

- Northside: along the south side of the east part of Yewtree Lane and of the west end of Ringway Road, from west to east:
  - big, with white walls: Hangar 1/2, built in 1938; "MANCHESTER RINGWAY" on its flat roof: until WWII, and after the RAF left it until 1949, was the terminal building; the RAF held onto it for some time after WWII ended.
  - big, black: Hangar 2/3: a Bellman hangar, built in mid-1939: in World War II used by Air Transport Auxiliary (ATA).
    - north of #2/3: a roadside square of about 6 old buildings (Firtree Farm: see File:Aa oldwythenshawe 00.jpg), reused as airfield buildings); sheds
  - big, black: Hangar 3/4: a Bellman hangar, built early in World War II: in World War II used by Parachute Training School for ground training.
    - north of #3/4: sheds.
  - - - - All the above were swept away before Terminal 1 opened, to enable a new apron to be created and to enable its passenger piers to be built.
  - Hangar -/5: a Bellman hangar, built early WW2 but after the first numbering, removed in 1954 to allow for a domestic apron extension.
  - big, black: Hangar 4/6, erected in 1939-40 and used by No. 1 Parachute Training School RAF for ground training.
  - big, black: Hangar 5/7, built in 1939-40 and used by No. 1 Parachute Training School RAF for aircraft maintenance.
- At northwest:
  - Fairey Aviation's buildings.
  - A hangar whose later number was 1.
- At southeast: 3 hangars (numbered 521, 522, 523) as described above.

== After World War II: back to civilian use ==
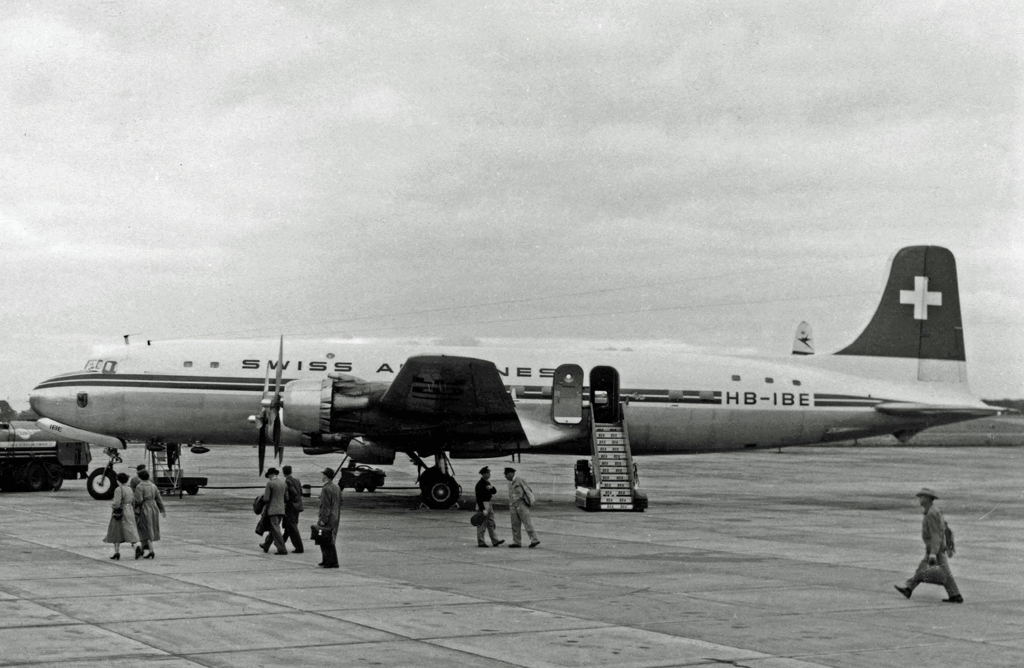
After WWII, the airport returned to civilian use; a Swissair Douglas DC-6B pictured at Ringway Ringway in July 1954

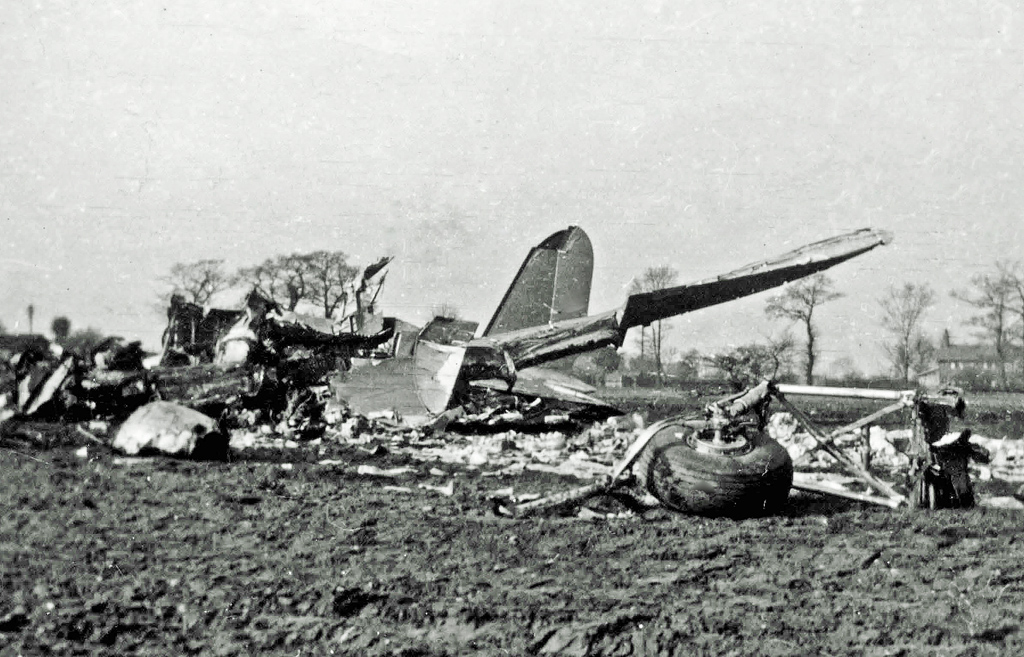
Wreckage of the Douglas Dakota cargo aircraft involved in the 1951 Ringway Dakota crash

After World War II the airport grew massively.

- 1946-1957: No. 613 Squadron RAF (City of Manchester Squadron) had its home base at RAF Ringway using Hangar No.7, and flew Supermarine Spitfires and De Havilland Vampire jet fighters in its fighter role as a unit within the Royal Auxiliary Air Force.
- The buildings at the western end of the complex, including the control tower, were returned to civilian use. Externally they were rendered and painted in art-deco style, to give a modern appearance. Internally a passenger terminal was fitted out, including a glass-walled observation restaurant facing the apron. As a public relations exercise, space was allocated within the lower tower as a club room for the Ringway Spotters Club. This branch of the Ian Allan-inspired hobby of aircraft spotting later changed its name to Society of Northern Aeronautical Enthusiasts, rapidly becoming known by its initials, SNAE. Members sported an enamel badge similar to the BOAC Bluebird but in red in place of blue. These spotters and the general public were catered for by a large viewing enclosure, adjacent to the western end of the building. They were provided with a more modest cafe, in the form of a large single-storey prefabricated building. Near this cafe, a small gate in the chain link fence, which kept the public off the apron, gave access to those wanting to take a pleasure flight. These were provided by Airviews Ltd. who operated an Auster monoplane, and two De Havilland biplanes, a Dragon Rapide and a Fox Moth. Five shillings (now 25p) bought you a flight around Wythenshawe.
- 27 March 1951: an Air Transport Charter Douglas Dakota 3 cargo aircraft en route for Nutts Corner Airport in Northern Ireland crashed shortly after takeoff, half a mile from the end of the runway at Ringway. Two crew members were killed.
- 1 April 1952: 24-hour operation was introduced.
- 28 October 1953: The first trans-Atlantic schedule commenced using Douglas DC-6Bs began, operated by Sabena Belgian World Airlines to New York's Idlewild Airport (now JFK Airport).
- 1954: The airport handled its millionth passenger since the Second World War. The hangar whose later number was 5, was removed, to allow a westerly extension of the main apron for domestic airline traffic.
- March 1957: 613 Squadron (and all other Royal Auxiliary Air Force squadrons) were disbanded. RAF Ringway was closed and its hangars and other buildings were handed over for civil airline operations including cargo and maintenance.
- 14 March 1957: British European Airways Flight 411 arriving from Amsterdam Schiphol International Airport crashed on approach to Ringway Airport and hit a house in Wythenshawe. All on board, 20 passengers and crew, were killed along with two people in the house.
- The passenger terminal, at the western end, was closed down and a new temporary terminal was converted from the old RAF buildings, in preparation for the start of the rebuild. Check-in was in a converted hangar and adopted the now familiar layout. The main difference from today was that not just the luggage was weighed. All passengers too, were required to stand on the big Avery scales, and were charged accordingly. The departure lounge, known as the Traffic Hall, was converted from one of the big brick "H" blocks. Along with comfortable seating, the lounge contained a long bar, backed by a full-length, brightly coloured, three-dimensional collage. On a table, in the centre of the hall, was a large display case containing an architect's model of how the new airport would look. The modernity was even taken into the toilets, which had the first warm-air hand driers. Outside, the remainder of the ex RAF buildings became the Freight Village. A new but smaller viewing enclosure was allocated adjacent to the west end of the new terminal. No cafe, no toilets, just a bare rectangle of concrete. The chain link fence was usually lined with bicycles, which were regularly blown over when the BEA and Dan-Air DC3 Dakotas opened up both engines before turning right and taxiing out. No push-back then. No steerable nose wheels either. Just full power and hard right rudder.

== Start of the modern terminals ==
The main passenger terminal designed by Stefan Buzás opened in 1968 featured a spacious modern departure hall with noted Venetian glass chandeliers by Bruno Zanetti

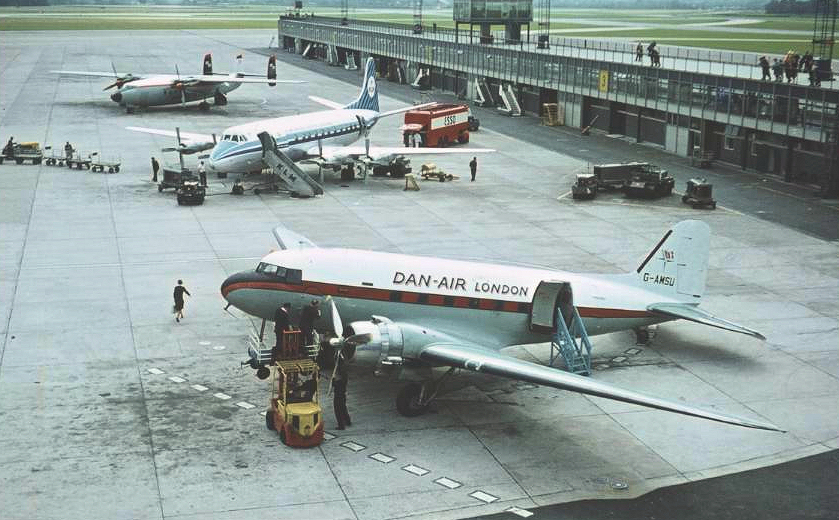
Pier B of the 1962 Terminal (now Terminal 1) in summer 1964 showing the angled parking then used and a Dan-Air Douglas Dakota, KLM Vickers Viscount and Dan-Air Airspeed Ambassador. The public viewing terrace on the pier is visible

- 1958: Start of building the current Terminal 1, adjacent to the north side of Yewtree Lane, north of Hangars 1/2 to 3/4. The east part of Yewtree Lane was closed to the public and enclosed in the airport, and became an airport internal road, with vehicle passages under the north ends of Terminal 1's piers. Its east end became an airport entry. (Before this, an airport car park developed north of Yewtree Lane, as more passengers came without a chauffeur and so had to leave their cars at the airport while they were away; also airport auxiliary buildings.)
- 1958: By then the airport was handling 500,000 passengers annually.
- 23 April 1958: Another main runway extension (from 5,900 ft (1,800 m) to 7,000 ft) was opened on permitting regular non-stop scheduled flights to North America. For about 6 to 12 months after this, the A538 road ran across the runway with gates or traffic lights like a level crossing and was shut whenever an aeroplane crossed it, while a new route for the A538 was built.
- 1958 to 1962: Several north-side buildings of the old airfield along the south side of Yewtree Lane were removed, as they would have interfered with functioning of the new Terminal 1. Firtree Farm, which had survived used as airfield buildings, was where the north end of Terminal 1's east pier is.
- October 1962: the airport's first purpose-built post-war terminal (later to be designated Terminal 1) was completed at a cost of £2.7 million terminal and ceremonially opened by Prince Philip. Manchester was then the only airport in Europe to have aircraft piers, allowing passengers remain under cover as they boarded an aircraft. The interior of the main departure hall was designed by the Hungarian architect Stefan Buzás, and it featured four 17-foot (5.2 m) chandeliers created by the glass maker Bruno Zanetti at the Venini glass factory in Murano, Italy. Each chandelier cost £3,000 and consisted of 1300 pieces of hand-blown Venetian glass droplets, together weighing 2 tons.

== The widebody era and further expansion ==
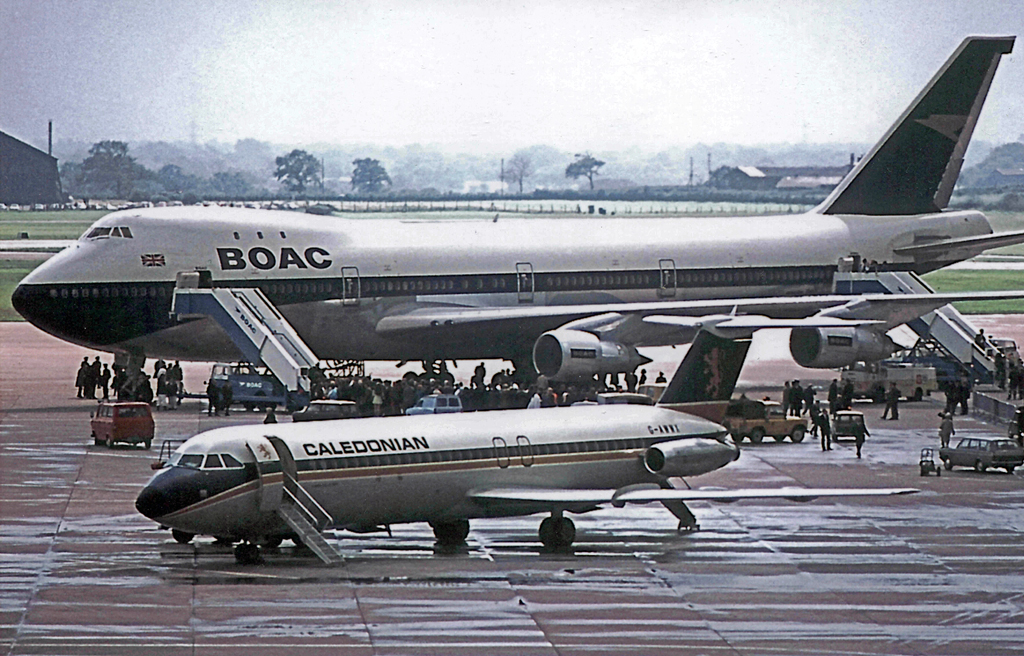
This BOAC Boeing 747 was the first widebody airliner to arrive at the airport on 17 August 1970

- 1968: Construction started on the M56 motorway, and it opened to Manchester Airport in 1972. (Conditions where it crossed Hasty Lane were unsuitable for a vehicle bridge, so the underbridge there is for pedestrians and bicycles only, and a cart track called Runger Lane from Yewtree Lane near its northwest end to the A538 road was made into a road to restore the connection. Some time after this, the part of Outwood Lane west of the M56 junction was renamed as part of Thorley Lane.)
- 1970: The first widebody airliner arrived at the airport on 17 August when BOAC brought their Boeing 747 to test Ringway's facilities for the type
- 1974: A Local Government Review placed the airport entirely within the city of Manchester boundaries in the new metropolitan Greater Manchester area. However, due to constant expansion of the airport it had expanded back into Cheshire by the early 1980s. The airport has since expanded farther into Cheshire, mainly because the second runway is almost entirely in Cheshire.
- 1975: The airport decided to drop the name "Ringway" and renamed the airport "Manchester International Airport" severing links with the RAF past and the village after which the airport was named, a title retained until 1 April 1986 when it reverted to Manchester Airport, it having been patently obvious that the airport was international.
- 17 August 1982: Opening of main runway extension to its current length of 10,000 ft (3,000 m) to attract long-haul flights from worldwide destinations. The A538 road from Altrincham to Wilmslow had to be diverted further south to a tunnel under the runway; the cut ends of its old course became airport back gates. This extension work (and building Runway Two later) needed heavy earthworks in the Bollin river valley, as the flat area around the original Ringway is much smaller than the flat area around Heathrow near London. This road diversion ran south of the locally well-known Oversleyford Brickworks, which was south of the original course of the A538 road. (The brickworks later closed and was demolished and its site fell down to wild vegetation and became an unofficial motorcycle scrambling ground. Land to the north of it to the west of Altrincham Road (Styal) became an unofficial planespotting area.)
- 1980s: The airport was designated an "international gateway".
- 1980s: The northwest side of Altrincham Road (Styal) was lined with a high embankment with dense trees planted on, to prevent aircraft spotting, due to a fear of use by terrorists' lookout men. (The remaining part of Altrincham Road (Styal) runs west from Hollin Lane (B5166 road) into the Styal area.)

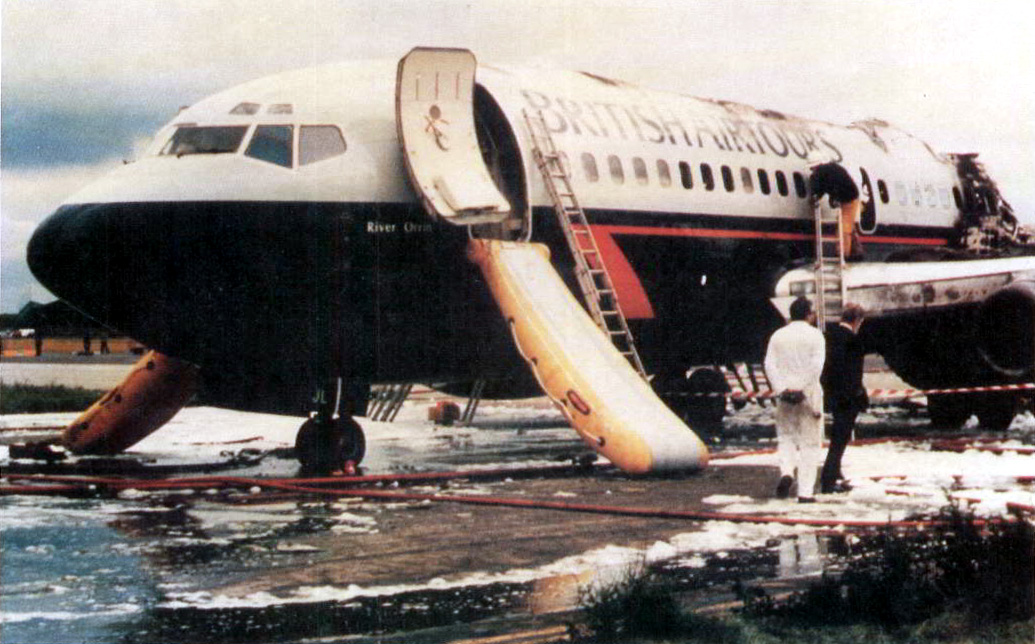
The burned wreckage of British Airtours Flight 28M on runway 24 at Manchester International Airport in August 1985

- 22 August 1985: British Airtours Flight 28M bound for Corfu International Airport in Greece caught fire on the runway at Manchester International Airport prior to takeoff. 55 people on board were killed.

== 3 terminals ==
- 1986: The World Freight Terminal (Manchester Airport goods area) opened. Building it expanded the airport westwards, taking up land around The Grange lane-junction and obliterating most of the west remnant of Yewtree Lane and the north part of Pinfold Lane.
- 1987: the passenger terminal underwent refurbishment and the departure hall chandeliers were taken down for cleaning, and re-hung at the side of the hall.
- 1988: The airport celebrated its golden jubilee and by this time was handling 9.5 million passengers annually. Due to increasing passenger numbers a second terminal was soon needed.
- May 1989: Terminal 1A Domestic (later renamed Terminal 3) was opened by Diana, Princess of Wales.
- Early 1990s: The western longterm car parking area was made or greatly enlarged, and aircraft standing area was enlarged, obliterating Etrop Green Farm (which was demolished in 1989) and its road-junction and trees and pond, and Fields Farm. Runger Lane was extended northwards to bypass this car park area and join Thorley Lane, which was rerouted to the north. A brick barn of Etrop Green Farm survived for a time fenced off among the car parking. The east end of this car parking area obliterated Woodhouse Farm.
- Early 1990s: Car parking was much expanded eastwards across Shadow Moss, and obliterated Heyhead (a group of old houses and a shop and a chapel) despite a protest group. Two old cottages were left on the north side of the west end of the old Ringway Road due to preservation orders, but they have now disappeared.
- May 1992: An official Aviation Viewing Park was created just off the A538 road on the south-western side of the airfield. This replaced the unofficial Oversleyford plane-spotting area.
- 1993: Terminal 2 opened.

== Railway station ==
- 1993: Manchester Airport railway station opened, connecting the airport to the national rail network. It is the terminus of a spur line west from the railway line from Manchester through Styal to Wilmslow and Crewe.

== Second runway ==
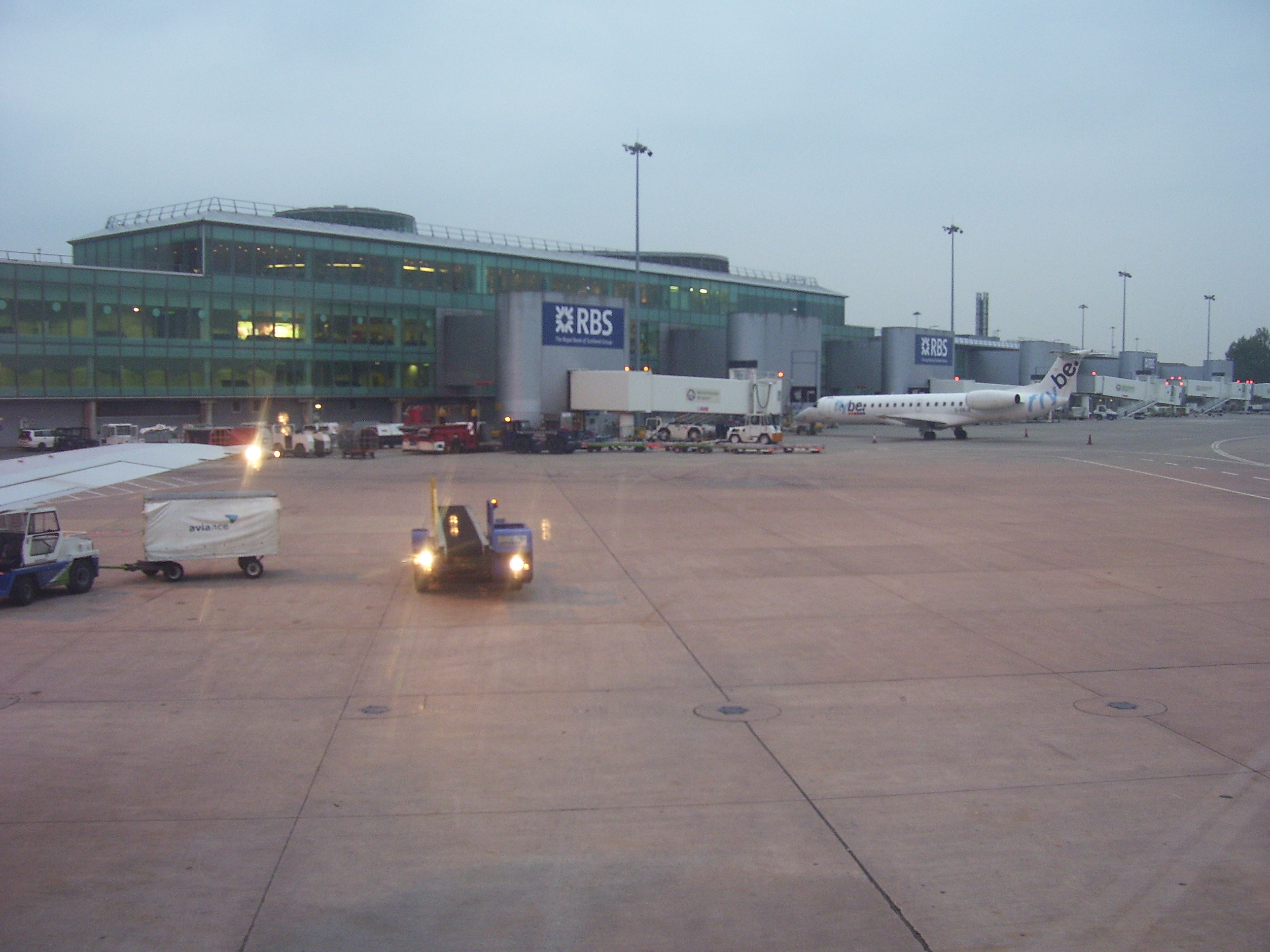
Aircraft stands at Terminal 3

- 1997: Planning permission was granted on 15 January for Manchester's "Runway Two", now Runway 23L/05R (the fourth runway to be constructed on the airport site) and work started the same year. The resulting intrusion onto woodland in the Styal area caused public reaction and protest camps. The new runway had to be embanked over the A538 road, which now runs through tunnels under both runways; this needed heavy earthworks, and a temporary railway was built into the southern edge of the airport to carry trains with limestone aggregates from Derbyshire. It obliterated the Oversleyford Brickworks site, which had become a wildlife area. It cut Altrincham Road (Styal) and obliterated farms in the Oversleyford area, and as a result traffic that used that road now must go a long way round through the centre of Wilmslow; the lost section has been replaced by a path along the Bollin river valley passable by pedal cycle or horse but not with a powered vehicle. The cut ends of this road are now airport back gates. The river Bollin goes through a culvert under the new runway.
  During this construction there were important prehistoric finds at Oversley Farm (which is now under Runway Two): see Oversleyford#Oversley Farm.
- June 1998, British Airways opened their new £75 million terminal facility designed by Grimshaw Architects, a major extension to Terminal 3; they and their partner airlines were the primary users of Terminal 3
- 5 February 2001: Runway Two opened at a cost of £172 million and was the first full-length commercial runway to open in the UK for over 20 years.

== 21st century ==
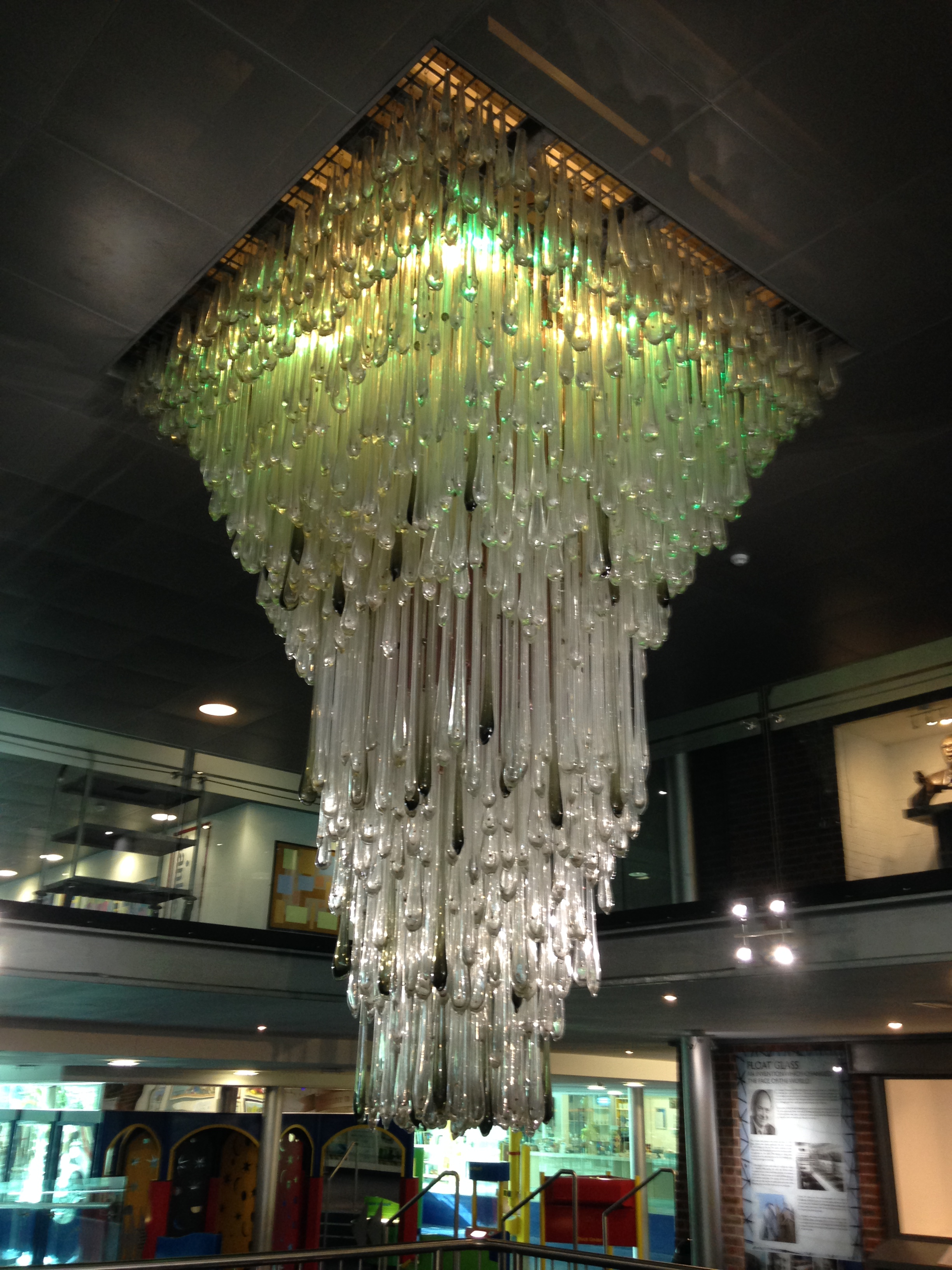
One of the Manchester Airport chandeliers is now displayed at World of Glass, St Helens

- 2003: The passenger terminal underwent further modernisation work and the large glass chandeliers were taken down and put into storage. One chandelier was later put on display at the World of Glass Museum in St Helens, and another was given to the Manchester Museum of Science and Industry (MOSI).
- 2003: On 31 October 2003, Concorde lands at Manchester for the last time. British Airways Concorde G-BOAC, the flagship of the fleet due to its BOAC registration, is placed on permanent display at the Runway Visitor Park (then called the Aviation Viewing Park).
- 2004: Another milestone was achieved: the airport reached 20 million passengers a year.
- 2004: The new £60 million integrated public transport interchange was opened (called "The Station"), bringing bus, coach and rail passengers under one roof. Manchester Airport was to be adapted to accept Airbus A380 aircraft, as part of the larger expansion at the airport and would be certified as a diversion aerodrome for A380 flights.
- Evening of 6 June 2007: The signs on taxiways and entrances to the runway were changed to follow the direction reassignments. The runway designators changed at the same time.
- 7 June 2007: at 00:00 UTC (01:00 BST), Manchester Airport's runway assignments were changed in relation to the magnetic compass bearings. The previous headings for the runways were 056° and 236° with assignments 06L/24R and 06R/24L respectively. The new headings for the runways are 054° and 234° with new assignments of 05L/23R and 05R/23L respectively.
- January 2009: By now the only surviving building from RAF Ringway was the Officers Mess (Building 217) in Ringway Road and until recently used as the Airport Archive.
- Late 2009: After a terrorism scare, the layout of Departures at Terminal 1 was changed: the only part accessible without going through security is a passage across the front where the airlines' ticket offices are. The former big hall has been divided into lounges and passages at two levels. The well-known big chandeliers from that hall are now in a museum in Manchester. This alteration caused the loss of the indoor not-security-cleared through-route between Terminal 1 and the domestic terminal.
- March 2010: Emirates announced that they would start daily A380 flights on one of their two daily flights from Manchester to Dubai, the service began on 1 September 2010.
- 2011: The airport took over Cloughbank Farm (between the aviation viewing area and the Ringway chapel crossroads) and began using it as a work yard to repair and upgrade Runway 1 and its runway lighting.

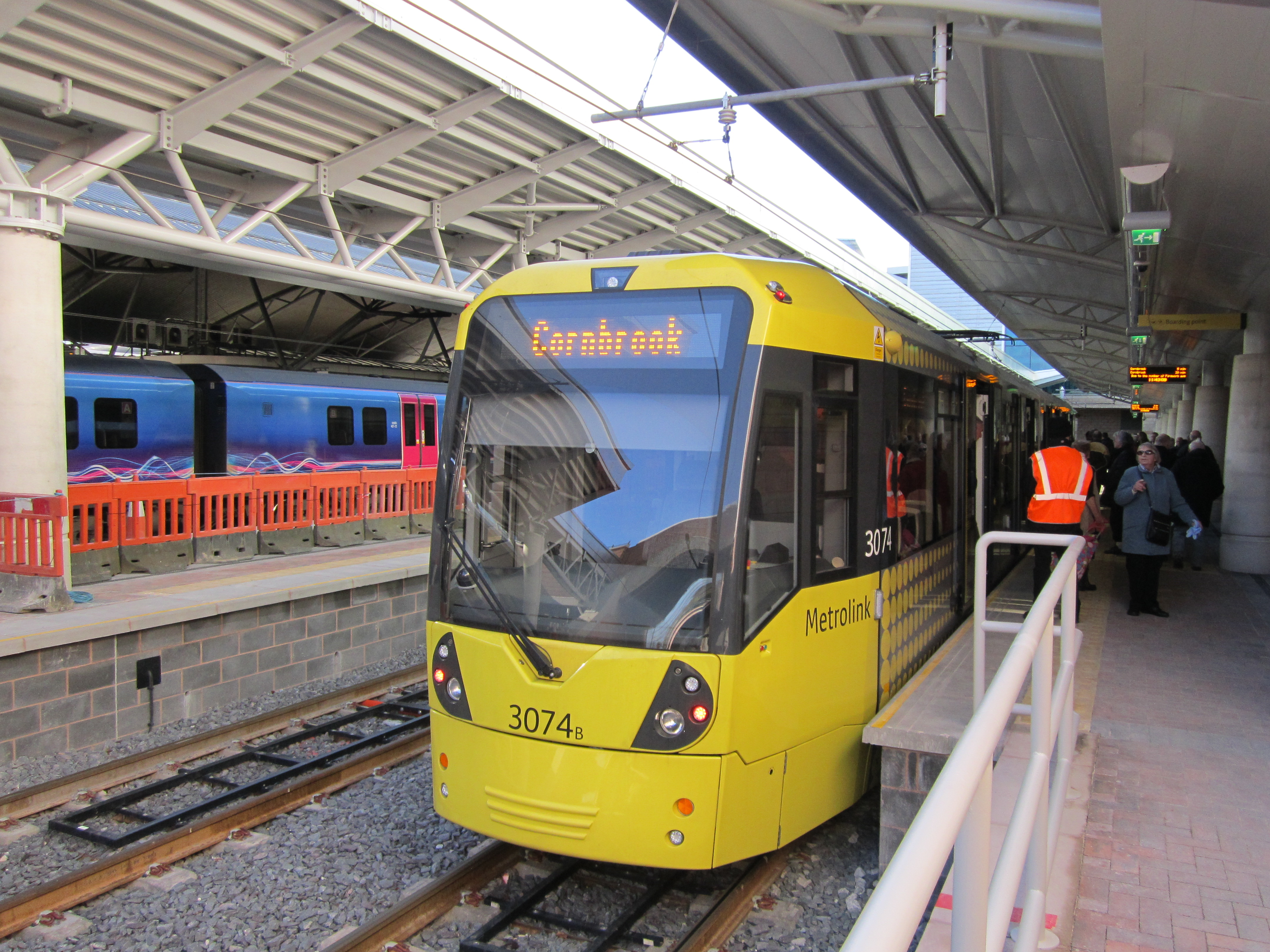
Manchester Airport railway and tram station

- 2011: building work commenced on an airport terminus for the Manchester Metrolink Airport Line within the railway station. The tram stop opened on 3 November 2014.
- 17 May 2012: de Havilland Hornet Moth G-ADND landed again at Manchester Airport, 75 years after it first landed there, piloted by its current owner David Weston, from Bristol. Peter Menzies, son of its 17 May 1937 Fairey Aviation pilot Duncan Menzies, rode as passenger.
- In June 2013 a new, 60-metre-tall (200 ft) air traffic control tower costing £20 million was opened.
- In 2019, PremiAir VIP terminal (adjacent to the Runway Visitor Park) began construction expected to open later in the year.

== Bibliography ==
- Scholefield, R.A. (1998). Manchester Airport. Sutton Publishing Ltd. ISBN 0-7509-1954-X.
