= Oversleyford =

Coordinates: 53.3431°N 2.2774°W

There are places called Oversley elsewhere in England.

Oversley and Oversleyford (sometimes Oversley Ford) is a name used for some places in an area near Manchester Airport.

- Oversleyford Bridge, where the A538 road from Altrincham to Wilmslow crosses the River Bollin
- Oversley Lodge Farm (as at August 2011 occupied by an asbestos cleanup firm for training)
- Oversley Farm, and Oversleyford Brickworks, now obliterated by Runway 2 of Manchester Airport

The name is first recorded in the 13th century as Vulverichelei and seems to come from Anglo-Saxon Wulfrīces lēah (Wulfrīc's clearing or meadow). The ford was probably a few yards north of the modern main road Oversleyford Bridge, where a minor road bridges the Bollin; that minor road is now a back entry to a hotel's front yard but was part of the A538 road before it was diverted for a runway extension. The name Oversleyford is at the middle of the south edge of this old Ordnance Survey map.

== Oversley Farm ==
Remains of a timber long house were found near at Oversley Farm during the building of Manchester Airport's second runway. Oversley Farm has been described as "by far the most important prehistoric site within the boundaries of the twenty-first-century city ... [and] ... one of the most important in the North West". It is the site of an Early Neolithic farming community, although it is now underneath runway two of Manchester Airport. The longhouse measured 10 metres (33 ft) by 7 metres (23 ft) with a central hearth. Material in the pit was radiocarbon dated to 3975 BC to 3675 BC. The site was probably in use into the Late Bronze Age.
