= Wilmslow Hockey Club =

English field hockey club

Wilmslow Hockey Club is a hockey club in Wilmslow, Cheshire, England. It was founded in 1896/97 as Wilmslow Men's Hockey Club. As of 2020, it is based at Styal, and fields five men's and four women's teams, as well as several youth teams. The men's first team were promoted to the North Hockey League Premier Division at the end of the 2019–20 season. The women's first team play in the North League Division One.
