= Bolton Arena =

Multipurpose indoor arena in Bolton, England

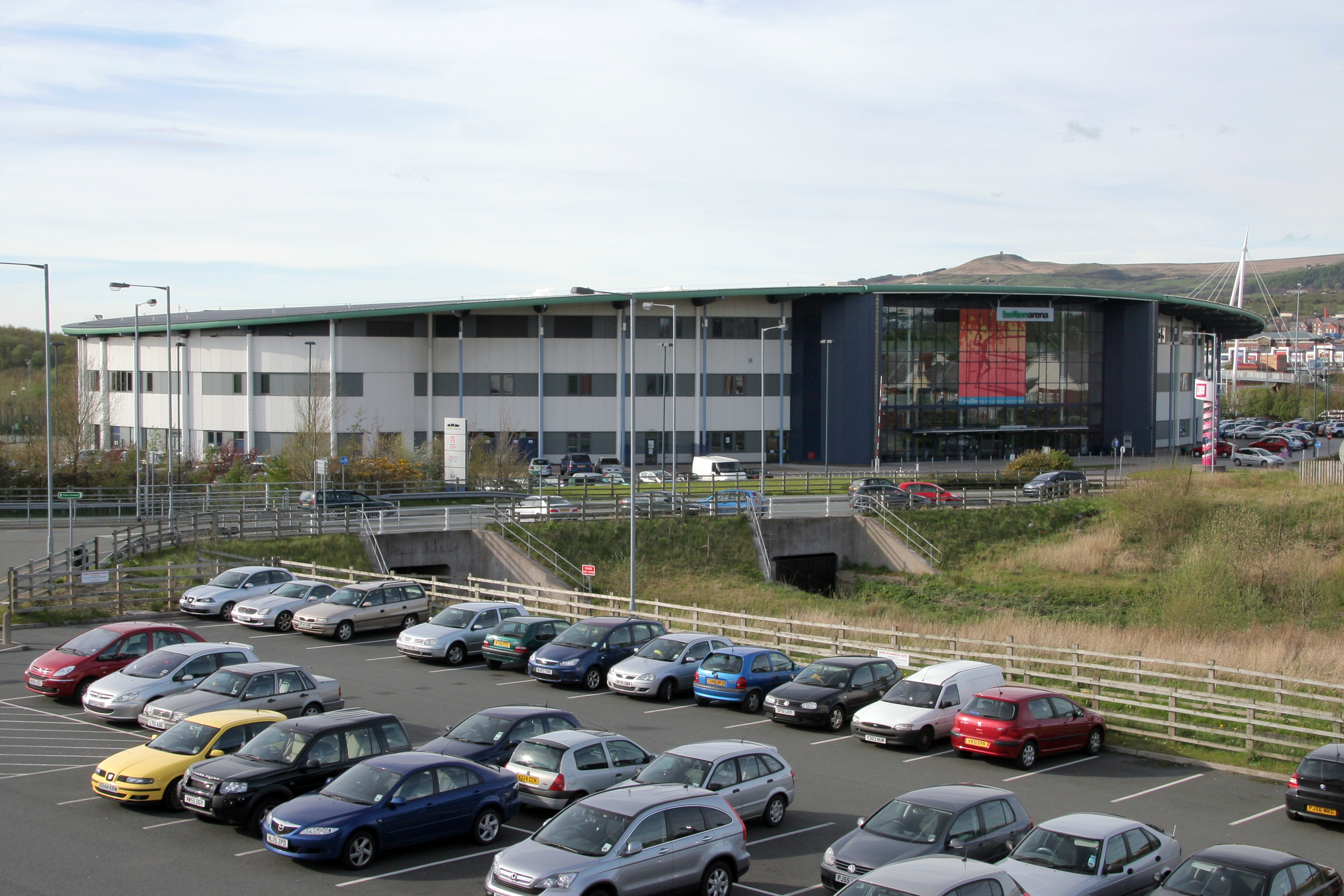
- Interactive map of Bolton Arena
- Location: Middlebrook, Bolton, Greater Manchester
- Coordinates: 53°34′45″N 2°32′21″W
- Owner: Bolton Arena Trading Limited
- Capacity: 6,500

Construction
- Built: October 1999 to February 2001
- Opened: 14 July 2001; 25 years ago (official)
- Architect: Bradshaw Gass & Hope

Website
- boltonarena.co.uk

Bolton Arena is a multi-purpose indoor arena, located at Middlebrook on the boundary between Horwich and Lostock in the Metropolitan Borough of Bolton, Greater Manchester, England. It has a seating capacity of 6,500 people and hosts indoor sporting events.

The facility also includes a tennis centre with eight indoor acrylic courts and two floodlit clay courts, which is one of the Lawn Tennis Association's nineteen High Performance Centres.

== Construction ==
The arena was designed for Bolton Council and its partners Sport England and the Lawn Tennis Association by Bolton architects Bradshaw Gass & Hope who also acted as lead consultants and Structural Engineers to the project, although, the concept design was developed initially as a joint venture between the former Borough Architect, Patrick Taylor and Mark Head, then a partner of Bradshaw Gass and Hope. Construction took place between October 1999 and February 2001 and cost £10,000,000.

The arena opened to the public in April 2001 and celebrated its official opening on the 14 July 2001.

== Events ==
During the 2002 Commonwealth Games, it hosted the badminton competition. It also serves as the hometown venue for boxer Amir Khan.

Between March 4 and March 6 of 2011, it played host to Great Britain's 2011 Davis Cup Europe/Africa Zone Group II first round match against Tunisia. Great Britain won 4-1 to advance to the second round.

== See also ==
- List of Commonwealth Games venues
