= The Carrs Park =

Park in Wilmslow, Cheshire, England

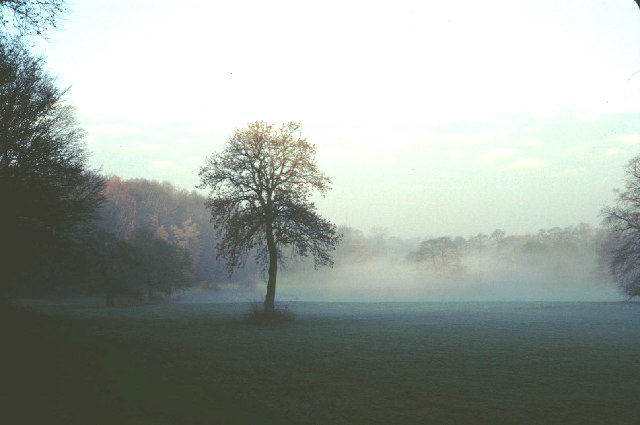
- The park in 1998
- Interactive map of The Carrs Park
- Type: Park
- Location: Wilmslow, Cheshire, England
- Coordinates: 53.3319°N 2.2344°W
- Area: 28.7 hectares (71 acres)
- Operator: Cheshire East Council
- Open: All year

The Carrs Park is a park in Wilmslow, Cheshire, England. The park was gifted to the town by Henry Boddington and follows the path of the River Bollin.

== History ==
The word 'Carrs' comes from the Old Norse word 'Kjarr' meaning 'meadow recovered from bog' and indicates the original state and subsequent use of the area. Most of the land upon which the park lies was owned by Lord Stamford and part of the Pownall Hall estate until being sold during the period 1841 to 1859. In 1800, a cotton mill was built on the site using the River Bollin for power. By 1828, it was being used to spin and weave silk, and in 1903, it was being used as a laundry. The building burned down in 1928, and little remains of it today. The park began to take shape in 1925 when Henry Boddington who founded Boddingtons Brewery and resident at Pownall Hall gave playing fields to the public, this is commemorated on a stone arch at Chancel Lane. In 1935 Wilmslow Urban District Council bought the land adjacent and established The Carrs Park. The park follows the River Bollin which meanders to Quarry Bank Mill and then to Styal Country Park. Quarry Bank was originally a working mill that took power from the River Bollin and is now owned by the National Trust and a tourist attraction.

== Facilities ==
There is a children's playground, multi-use football area, basketball, skateboard ramp, riverside and woodland walks, open grassland and picnicking. Wilmslow Parkrun takes place in the park, as does the Wilmslow Junior Parkrun. The area covered is 28.7 hectares (71 acres).

== See also ==
- List of parks and open spaces in Cheshire
