= A538 road =

Road in England

A538

Route information
- Length: 17 mi (27 km)

Major junctions
- North end: A560; Altrincham, Greater Manchester.

- M56; A34 A5102

- West end: A537; Macclesfield, Cheshire.

Location
- Country: United Kingdom
- Primary destinations: Prestbury; Wilmslow; Manchester Airport; Hale

Road network
- Roads in the United Kingdom; Motorways; A and B road zones

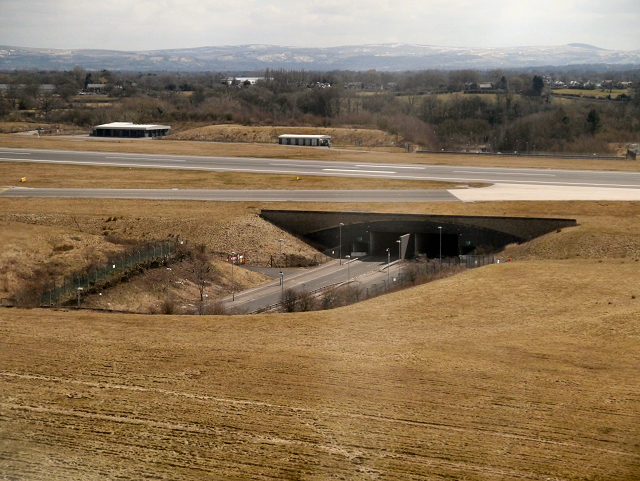
The A538 road runs beneath both runways via two separate tunnels. Part of the road is exposed between both runways of Manchester Airport.

The A538 is a road in England linking Macclesfield, Cheshire to Altrincham in Greater Manchester, through Prestbury, Wilmslow and Hale and providing access to Manchester Airport and the M56 motorway. The road is a Primary route between the A34 Junction in Wilmslow and Manchester Airport / M56 motorway.

== Route ==
The A538 starts in Macclesfield at the traffic light controlled junction on Hibel Road. Here the road in known as Beech Lane and continues north through Tytherington, becoming Manchester Road.

A short distance after leaving Tytherington, the A538 turns left into Heybridge Lane. The road then proceeds into Prestbury at a 30 mph speed limit, crossing over the Stoke-on-Trent to Manchester Piccadilly railway line. Into Prestbury village the speed limit drops to 20 mph. In Prestbury village, the road veers right at a roundabout and climbs towards Wilmslow, reverting to a 30 mph speed limit. This is now Wilmslow Road, becoming Prestbury Road close to Mottram Hall.

On the outskirts of Wilmslow, there is a roundabout with the A5102, then a half mile straight road to the A34. The A538 joins the A34 here by turning right at a roundabout, running down to a roundabout where it turns left; here the road gains Primary Status. It goes under the Wilmslow railway viaduct holding the Crewe to Manchester Piccadilly railway line, turns right at a roundabout where the B5166 joins, and runs past Wilmslow town centre to a set of traffic lights where it turns left and becomes Manchester Road. Between the roundabout and the traffic lights it is part of what was the A34 before the A34 Wilmslow bypass was built in the mid-1990s.

From the traffic lights, the road heads out toward Manchester Airport, being initially Water Lane, then shortly after, Altrincham Road. After leaving Wilmslow, the road is speed restricted to 40 mph or 50 mph through to the junction with the M56 motorway.

The road goes down a steep hill to the Oversleyford Bridge over the river Bollin, up afterwards, and through two tunnels under Manchester Airport's runways; since 1960 it has been diverted twice here (its original route survives partly as 'Old Wilmslow Road' through the minor crossroads by the Ringway chapel). After the tunnels, the road runs to a complex traffic light controlled roundabout junction with the M56 motorway Westbound and Runger Lane (which serves as an access road to Manchester Airport; it then goes under the M56 motorway to a roundabout junction with the M56 northbound. After this roundabout, the road loses its Primary Status.

The road from here on has a 30 mph speed restriction as the rest of the route is through built-up areas. The A538 goes through Hale Barns and Hale until a mini roundabout where it is turns right; this is now Altrincham Town Centre. It goes through three set of traffic lights and passes the combined bus / rail station, and veers left and runs through to a traffic light controlled cross roads, the junction with the A560 / B5164, where the A538 ends.
