= Emerson Group =

Property company of the United Kingdom

Emerson Developments (Holdings) Limited
- Company type: Private
- Industry: Property
- Founded: 1959; 67 years ago
- Headquarters: United Kingdom
- Area served: United Kingdom, Portugal, Florida (United States)
- Key people: Peter Emerson Jones (Chairman)
- Website: www.emerson.co.uk

The Emerson Group is one of the largest privately owned property development companies in the United Kingdom. Emerson was founded by Peter Emerson Jones in 1959 and is based in Alderley Edge, Cheshire, UK. Its subsidiaries include Orbit Developments (commercial property) and Jones Homes (residential). As well as UK operations, Emerson have activities in Portugal and Florida.

== Developments ==
Emerson's developments include:

=== United Kingdom ===
- Aintree Racecourse Retail & Business Park
- Cheadle Hulme Shopping Centre
- Imperial Point and Sovereign Point (residential), Salford Quays
- Lowry Outlet Mall, Salford Quays - now sold to the Peel Group
- Middlebrook (mixed-use) including the University of Bolton Stadium.
- Parkway Business Centre, Manchester
- Wilmslow, Cheshire - various developments

=== United States ===
- Residential developments in Florida
- Eagle Creek Golf Club

=== Portugal ===
- Residential developments in Lagos
