= Middlebrook, Greater Manchester =

Coordinates: 53.580°N 2.535°W

Middlebrook
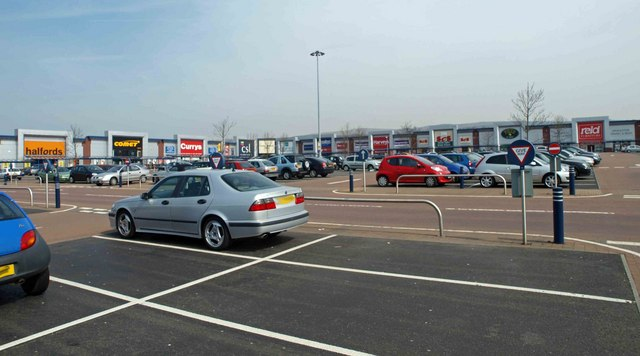
- Middlebrook Retail Park

- Location within Greater Manchester
- OS grid reference: SD645094
- Metropolitan borough: Bolton
- Metropolitan county: Greater Manchester
- Region: North West
- Country: England
- Sovereign state: United Kingdom
- Post town: BOLTON
- Postcode district: BL6
- Dialling code: 01204
- Police: Greater Manchester
- Fire: Greater Manchester
- Ambulance: North West
- UK Parliament: Bolton West

Middlebrook is a suburb that spans the boundaries of Horwich and Lostock in the Metropolitan Borough of Bolton, Greater Manchester, England (historically a part of Lancashire).

The name Middlebrook is derived from the watercourse the Middle Brook which starts at Red Moss, the mossland south of Horwich. Further downstream the Middle Brook joins with other tributaries and becomes the River Croal which runs through Bolton and eventually joins the River Irwell at Kearsley.

Middlebrook has retail, leisure and business parks and it is also the location of the University of Bolton Stadium, home of Bolton Wanderers F.C., and Horwich Police Station.

== History ==
The name Middlebrook (or Middle Brook) comes from the Old English words "mycel" and "broc" meaning "great brook". In 1292, the name was written "Mikelbrok" and over the centuries it became Middlebrook.

Before the retail, leisure and business parks were built Middlebrook was the site of Sefton Fold Farm in Horwich. The old timber framed farmhouse with sandstone flag roof as could have been seen latterly would seem to have dated from the 16th century with many intervening changes.

The floor plan would indicate a three bay farmhouse or hall: the latter access being a 'baffle' entry facing the central chimney stack; this may have also been the original position but could have been a more traditional 'screens' entrance adjacent to the service bay.

A cellar appears to have been located under the northern service bay and later GMAU investigations would infer that this used to be occupied by a small water wheel (for grinding domestic crops?)

That would also infer that a stream ran under the house at this point. A well existed very nearby in the yard but any evidence of a stream latterly had become obscured. Something of a rebuild appears to have happened around 1666 and was possibly refaced or altered in 1811, as evidenced by the semi circular datestone over the adjacent cottage which dates from 1811. However, an earlier late Georgian brick wing was seemingly added before that date, the bricks having been locally 'clamped'.

The old bay (parlour) closest to the 'new wing' as described had already had its wattle and daub removed and replaced with brick. The middle bay (housebody) and end bay (service) together with the north gable had been rebuilt in 'watershot' squared and coursed gritstone rubble, although when that happened is not clear, because the stone of the adjacent 1811 cottage was constructed from thinner, flaggy sandstone and not watershot.

The rear of the range was extended, evidently in the 19th century, from random sandstone rubble walling under a full 'catslide' stone flag roof, and this extension had a floor over creating a loft: this loft was accessed from the first floor and was laid with compressed straw and other material.

Floorboards upstairs in the main range were butt jointed and wide, of random size; some doorleaf stiles and rails were reed moulded and mortise framed and simply panelled, indicating 17th century origin. The floor over the 'housebody' was a much later addition to the original, being supported off separate beams running parallel to the long walls and resting on inserted brackets or 'corbels'.

The mortises and pegholes to the former arch bracing to the central house frame could still be seen, identifying that this part of the house was possibly originally double height, or at least, the floor was set much higher than latterly, rendering the upper floor of poor usage.

There is also the presence of a vestige of a wattle and daub 'fire hood', a forerunner of a later brick chimney stack. The opening to one side of the chimney stack upstairs was blocked up economically in brick on edge, the bricks were machine pressed with 'frogs' and bore the text 'Yates Plastic Horwich'. Much of the original timber framing remained within the rear 'outshut' including a former unglazed window complete with Oak stave mullions. the timber framing was set upon a high sandstone plinth, the same remained on the main frontage under the brick infill to the 'parlour' bay.

The complete wallplate remained over the rebuilt main east facade and exhibited all the original mortises and peg holes from the original framing, so a reasonable guess could be made at the appearance of the building. the timbers in the 'outshut' were all reused and exhibited peg holes, mortises and carpenters' marks.

There is a case for supposing that these were taken from the timbers replaced by the later stonework, and one beam in particular hinted at coming from the old north gable truss chord, due to its size and moulding. Other evidence in the timbers points at herringbone patterning within the framing, which would reflect the regional trend for such decoration. (these detailed notes modified and expanded by Mark Head, who surveyed the house in about 1985).

Before demolition in 1996, the University of Manchester's Archaeological Unit spent three weeks on the Sefton Fold Farm site. The team excavated a moated site of late medieval origins and pottery believed to date from the late 16th or early 17th centuries was found. When development started, the site was partly covered by a roundabout. The farmhouse's 1666/1811 date stone, 1860s cooking range and other items were saved and can be seen at the Heritage Centre in Horwich.

== Development ==
Emerson Group began developing the two hundred acre Middlebrook retail, leisure and business complex started in 1996, and the first businesses were operating from the site in 1998. The out of town retail centre, contains retail shops and stores, a twelve screen cinema, ten-pin bowling alley, cafés and restaurants, two hotels, and the Bolton Arena Sports & Leisure Complex. Horwich Police Station is located on Burnden Way at the Middlebrook site.

At the centre of the site is the Toughsheet Community Stadium (formerly University of Bolton Stadium, Macron Stadium and previously Reebok Stadium), home of Bolton Wanderers F.C. which was inaugurated on 1 September 1997, when the first game between Bolton and Everton was played.

== Transport ==
The Middlebrook site is adjacent to Junction 6 of the M61 motorway. The A6027 connects the A6 with the motorway, the retail and business parks and the A673 road to Horwich and Bolton. There is a regular train service provided by Northern at Horwich Parkway railway station where there is a Park and Ride facility with trains to Bolton, Manchester and Preston. There are also bus services which include the 516/ 517 from Leigh and 574/ 576/ 577, also from Bolton.
