= Wilmslow Town Council =

UK local authority for the town of Wilmslow, Cheshire, England

Type
- Type: Town Council

History
- Founded: 2011

Leadership
- Chairman: Cllr Frank McCarthy
- Vice Chairman: Cllr Angela McPake
- Town Clerk: Matthew Jackson

Structure
- Seats: 15 councillors
- Conservative: 8 / 15
- Residents of Wilmslow: 4 / 15
- Liberal Democrats: 3 / 15

Elections
- Last election: 2 May 2019
- Next election: 4 May 2023

Website
- www.wilmslowtowncouncil.gov.uk

Wilmslow Town Council is the town council for the Cheshire market town of Wilmslow and was established in May 2011 following a community governance review. It is the lowest tier of local government for the town and comprises 15 Councillors, all of whom work on a purely voluntary basis, supported by a Town Clerk, an Assistant Town Clerk and a Communications Officer.

The Town is split into four wards: Wilmslow East, Wilmslow West, Lacey Green and Dean Row. Each ward is represented by multiple Councillors who are elected by the residents every four years. In the May 2019 elections three of the wards were contested. Wilmslow East was uncontested.

Operating within the borough of Cheshire East Council, which retains the statutory responsibilities of a principle authority, Wilmslow Town Council works within the legal framework set out for town and parish councils to enhance and supplement services and to recognise and promote local initiatives.

The primary roles for the Town Council are to enhance and supplement services provided by the primary authority, to provide services and facilities that Cheshire East Council would not otherwise provide but which Wilmslow residents value, and to support and promote local initiatives and community groups. The Town Council also has a significant role in voicing the views and concerns of residents.

The Town Council duties include:

- To support and encourage community initiatives.
- To support the economic vibrancy of the town
- Review and comment on planning applications within the Parish
- Liaise with relevant authorities regarding infrastructure/policing/community issues to represent your views and get the best advantage for the local area
- Engage with all interested parties regarding current and future shape of life in the local area

Wilmslow Town Council is funded via a precept collected with the Council Tax, with Cheshire East Council passing this funding down to the Town Council.
