= Eagle Creek Golf Club =

Golf course in Orlando, Florida, US

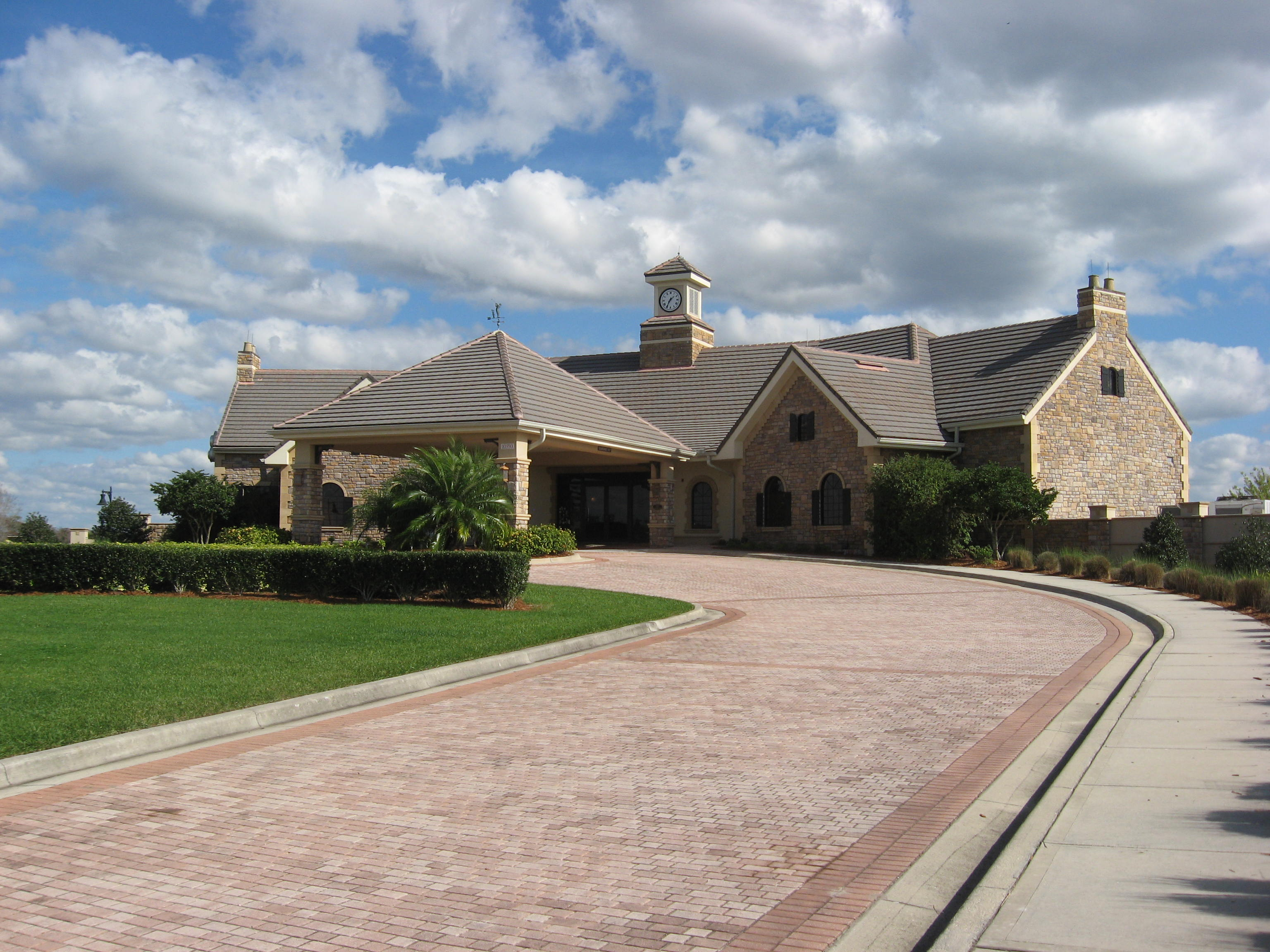
- The Eagle Creek Golf Clubhouse in January 2013

- Location within Florida
- Interactive map of Eagle Creek Golf Club
- 28.370013°N 81.237981°W

Club information
- Location: 10350 Emerson Lake Blvd Orlando, FL 32832
- Established: 2004
- Type: Public
- Tota holes: 18
- Website: www.eaglecreekorlando.com
- Par: 73
- Length: 7,198 yards (6,582 m)

Eagle Creek Golf Club is an eighteen-hole golf course located near the Lake Nona region of Orlando, Florida. The course has a par of 73 and measures 7,198 yards (6,582 m), containing five par-5 holes and over ninety bunkers. The course is public and includes a 14,000-square-foot (1,300 m^{2}) clubhouse with a pro shop as well as a 120-seat restaurant.

== History ==
Eagle Creek is an Emerson International development designed by Ron Garl and Howard Swan. The course opened for business in May 2004. Eagle Creek Golf Club was the first golf course in Florida to use Mini Verde Grass on its greens, and the first course in central Florida to offer PrecedentGolf Cars made by Club Car. In October 2004, Eagle Creek became home to Graves Golf Academy.

In November 2004, Travel + Leisure Golf magazine named Eagle Creek as one of the best courses to open in Florida since 2000. The course received a rating of 4.5 stars (out of 5) in Golf Digest's Places to Play program in June 2006; this was the highest rating ever awarded by Golf Digest to a Florida golf course.

Eagle Creek hosted a PGA Pro-Pro Series tournament in January 2005 during the week of the 52nd PGA Merchandise Show. In April 2006, Eagle Creek was named host site for the 2006 Florida Open.
