= RAF Wilmslow =

Former RAF base in Cheshire, England

RAF Wilmslow
- Near Wilmslow, Cheshire in England

Site information
- Type: RAF Training camp
- Owner: Air Ministry
- Operator: Royal Air Force
- Open to the public: No

Location
- Shown within Cheshire RAF Wilmslow (the United Kingdom)
- Coordinates: 53°20′10″N 2°12′14″W

Site history
- Built: 1938-39
- In use: 1940–1963

Royal Air Force Wilmslow or more simply RAF Wilmslow is a former Royal Air Force station that existed from 1938 until 1962 in Wilmslow, Cheshire. It was known as No. 4 School of Recruit Training.

== History ==
The land on which RAF Wilmslow came to be constructed was farmland, a part of the Bollin Hall, Wilmslow Park Estate, belonging to the Earl of Stamford at the time of the 1841 tithe survey.

Construction of RAF Wilmslow began on the outbreak of World War Two and the site opened in April 1940. Initially the site was the home to 'No. 6 Recruit Centre', which processed reserve airmen being called-up for duty. No. 6 Recruit Centre relocated to RAF Morecambe in March 1943.

The site then accommodated 'No. 2 Personnel Dispatch Centre', responsible for equipping and dispatching airmen to Canada and Africa. This may have operated from 13 November 1940. (The information in circulation about RAF Wilmslow has conflicting dates for the activities undertaken at RAF Wilmslow – most of the information is personal recollections of people who spent time there or who lived nearby. There may have been an element of dual use).

'RAF No. 31 (WAAF) Recruits Centre' was formed from No. 3 (WAAF) Depot, in Morecambe, on 30 November 1942, and relocated to Wilmslow on 24 February 1943. This was redesignated as 'RAF No. 31 School of WRAF Recruit Training, Wilmslow', on 1 November 1948. The dates suggest that this was a swap for No. 6 Recruit Centre.

From November 1948, through November 1959 the site also operated as 'RAF No. 4 School of Recruitment Training, Wilmslow', a basic training camp where recruits were stationed for around eight weeks of RAF procedural and operational education, prior to being posted to other RAF stations.

The latter two operated from the site concurrently.

The site accommodated a squadron sick-quarters, which also served other RAF facilities in the area, including RAF Ringway.

The site closed 30 November 1959, though it remained under care and maintenance until 22 February 1963.

RAF Wilmslow did not have an airfield, however, in 1955, a retired Supermarine Spitfire Vb (5377M) (EP120) was located at the southerly entrance as a ‘gate guardian’. In the years prior to the closure of RAF Wilmslow the Spitfire was replaced by a de Havilland Venom. Spitfire (5377M) (EP120) was sold in 1991 and restored for the privately operated vintage military fighter collection at Duxford Aerodrome.

== Current use ==
The station was demolished shortly after closing in 1962. During the 1980s, the eastern part of the camp was developed with housing by local construction company Jones Homes, forming the Summerfields development. During the early 1990s, the A34 bypass of Wilmslow was constructed, which cut the site in two. Between 1996 and 2015, the remaining western part of the site was developed for housing, forming The Villas and Regents Park developments.

== See also ==
- List of former Royal Air Force stations
