= Peter Emerson Jones =

- Born: March 1935 (age 91)
- Occupation: Property developer
- Known for: Founder & Chairman, Emerson Group
- Spouse: Audrey Jones
- Children: 2

Peter Emerson Jones OBE (born March 1935) is founder and chairman of the Emerson Group, one of the largest privately owned property development companies in the United Kingdom.

In May 2024, Jones was listed in the Sunday Times Rich List with an estimated net worth of £1.286 billion.

== Early life ==
Peter Emerson Jones was born in March 1935. Before going into property, Jones qualified as a joiner and worked for his father's business.

== Career ==
Jones founded the Emerson Group in 1959. Originally known as P E Jones Contractors, the company initially specialised in building houses on small plots of land in Cheshire. The company started developing properties in Bolton, Lytham, Glasgow and Sterling in the 1980s.

The Emerson Group is now one of the largest privately owned property development companies in the UK. It builds between 250 and 500 residential houses in the UK annually.

The company is based in Alderley Edge, Cheshire, and as well as housebuilding, owns Bolton's Middlebrook Park, Oasis Parque, Boavista Golf & Spa Resort and Jardim do Vau among other properties in Algarve, Portugal and Orlando, Florida. The business employs around 600 people.

== Personal life ==
He is married to Audrey, and their sons Tony and Mark are directors of the main holding company, Emerson Developments (Holdings), as are their parents.

In the 2014 New Year Honours, he received an OBE for services to business in the North West.

Peter and Audrey are also trustees of The Emerson Foundation.
