= Wilmslow =

Market town and civil parish in Cheshire, England

Coordinates: 53.325°N 2.239°W

- Town and civil parish
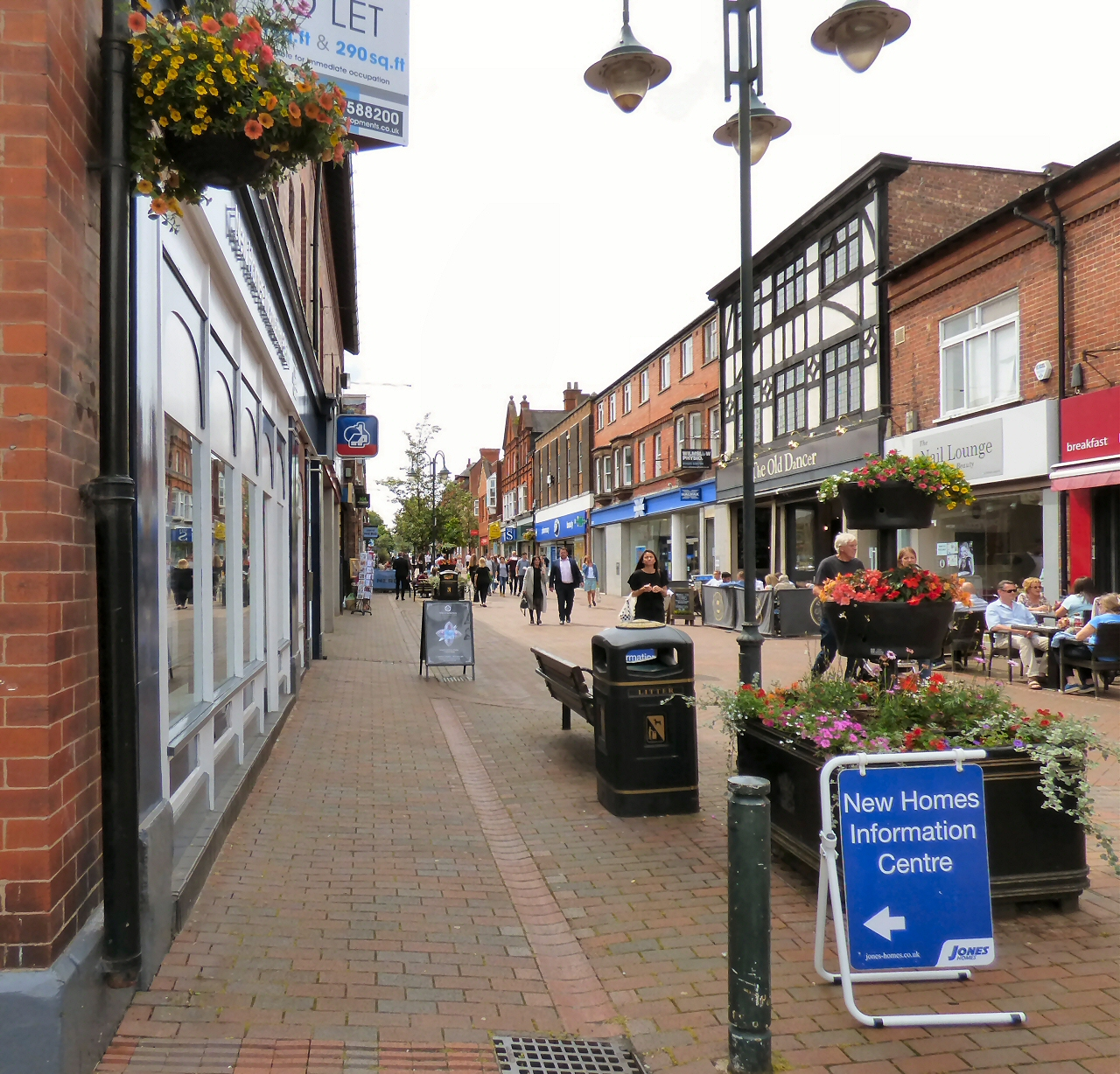
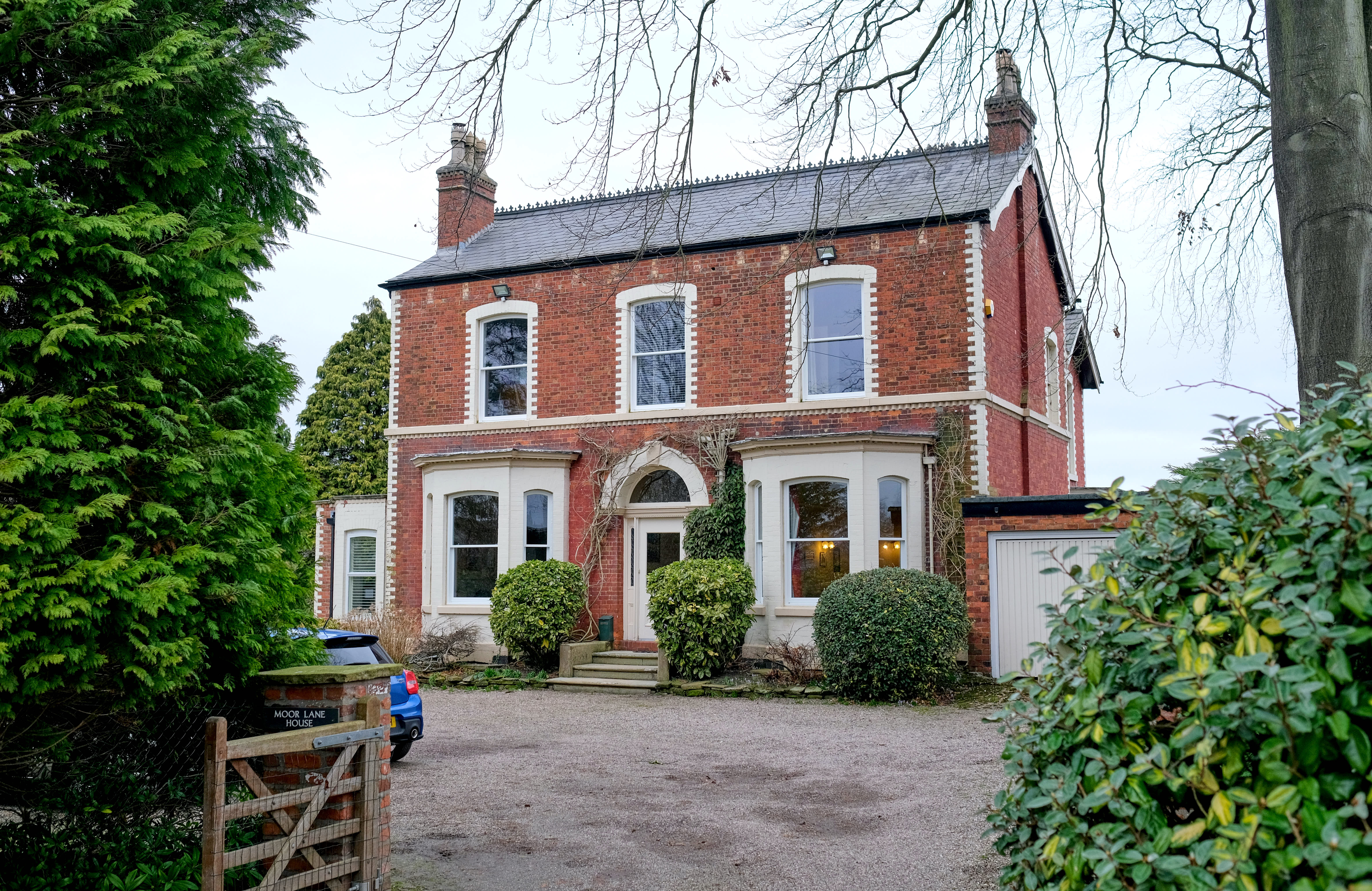
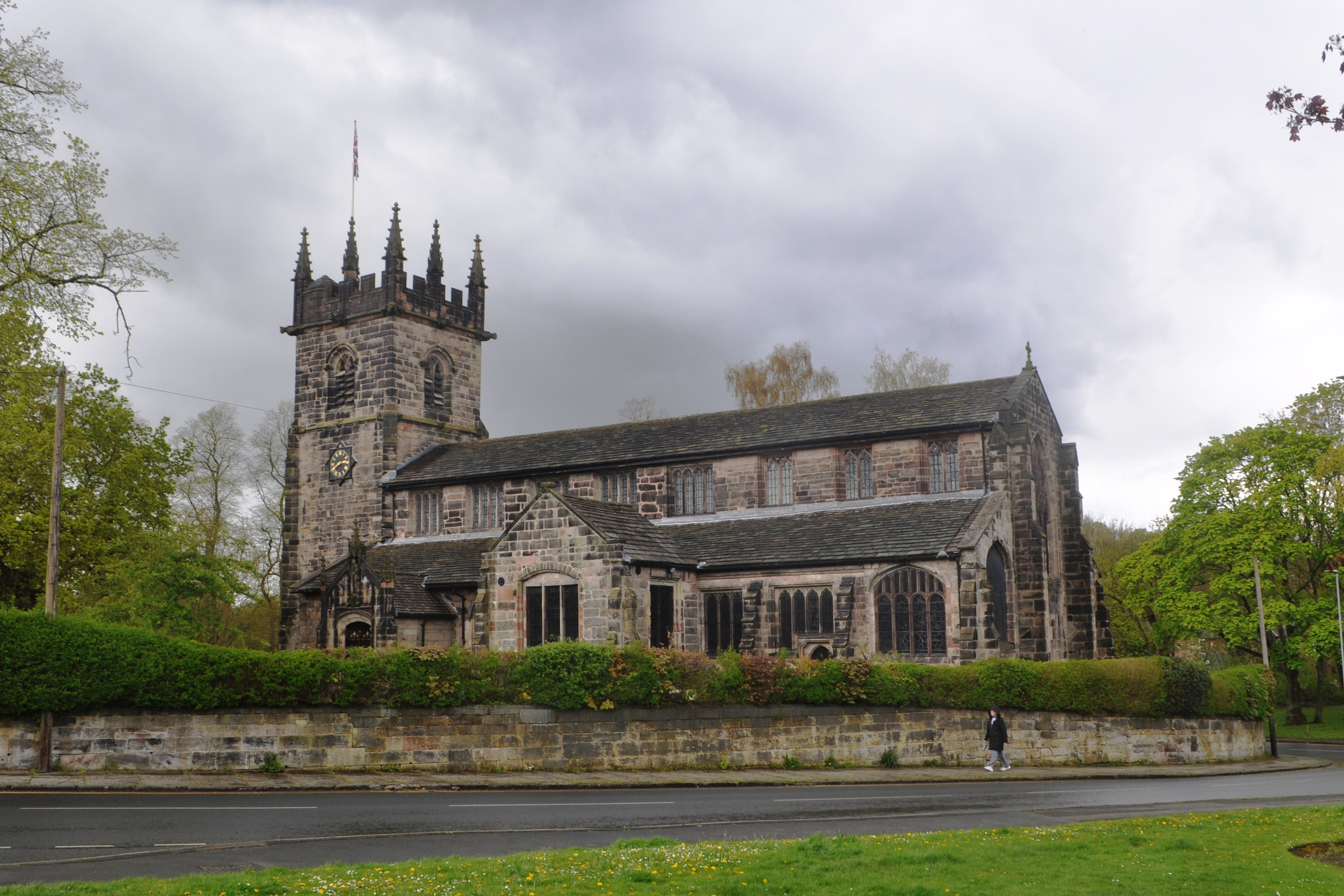
- Grove Street Moor Lane St Bartholomew's Church

- Coat of Arms of Wilmslow Town Council

- Location within Cheshire
- Population: 26,213 (parish, 2021); 25,725 (built up area, 2021)
- OS grid reference: SJ840810
  - London: 154 mi (248 km) SE
- Civil parish: Wilmslow
- Unitary authority: Cheshire East
- Ceremonial county: Cheshire
- Region: North West
- Country: England
- Sovereign state: United Kingdom
- Post town: WILMSLOW
- Postcode district: SK9
- Dialling code: 01625
- Police: Cheshire
- Fire: Cheshire
- Ambulance: North West
- UK Parliament: Tatton

Wilmslow (/ˈwɪlmsloʊ/ or /ˈwɪmsloʊ/) is a market town and civil parish in the borough of Cheshire East, in Cheshire, England. It lies 11 miles (18 km) south of Manchester and 7 miles (11 km) north-west of Macclesfield. At the 2021 census, the parish had a population of 26,213 and the built up area had a population of 25,725.

== History ==
=== Toponymy ===
Wilmslow derives its name from Old English Wīghelmes hlāw, meaning "mound of a man called Wīghelm".

=== Lindow Man ===
Much about the local Iron Age history of Wilmslow was uncovered with the discovery of Lindow Man, in Lindow Moss. Preserved in the peat bogs for 2,000 years, Lindow Man is one of the most important Iron Age finds in the country. Despite a campaign to keep Lindow Man in the area, he was transferred to the British Museum and is a central feature of the Iron Age exhibition. He returned to Manchester Museum in April 2008 for a year-long exhibition.

=== Recent history ===
An IRA bomb exploded near the railway station in March 1997, damaging signalling equipment. The original IRA message was confusing and led to the evacuation of the Wilmslow police station to the local leisure centre not far from the explosion. Nobody was hurt.

In the general election of the same year, the parliamentary constituency of Tatton, in which Wilmslow falls, made headlines as part of the "sleaze" accusations levelled against the then Conservative Government. Tatton MP, Neil Hamilton, was accused of accepting cash for tabling Parliamentary questions; he was defeated subsequently in the election by independent candidate Martin Bell. Bell was supported in his door to door canvassing for votes by David Soul and served a single term as MP.

== Governance ==
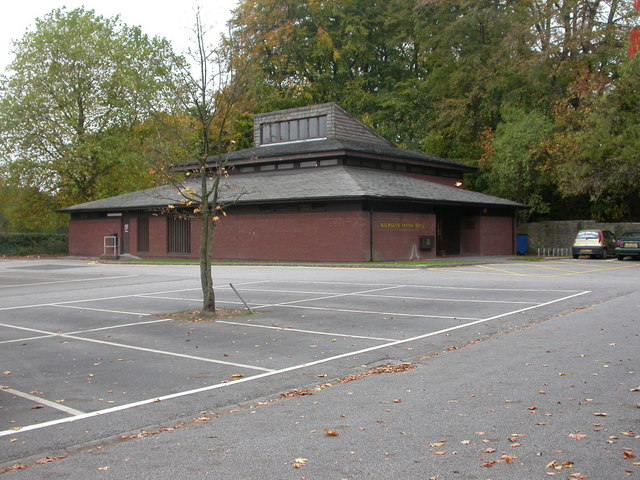
Wilmslow Parish Hall

There are two tiers of local government covering Wilmslow, at parish (town) and unitary authority level: Wilmslow Town Council and Cheshire East Council. The town council is based at the Parish Hall on Cliff Road.

=== Administrative history ===
Wilmslow was an ancient parish in the Macclesfield Hundred of Cheshire. The parish was subdivided into four townships, called Bollin Fee, Chorley, Fulshaw, and Pownall Fee. The town centre and the parish church of St Bartholomew's lay in the Bollin Fee township. From the 17th century onwards, parishes were gradually given various civil functions under the poor laws, in addition to their original ecclesiastical functions. In some cases, including Wilmslow, the civil functions were exercised by each township separately rather than the parish as a whole. In 1866, the legal definition of 'parish' was changed to be the areas used for administering the poor laws, and so the townships each became separate civil parishes, which therefore diverged from the ecclesiastical parish.

In 1862, a Chorley local government district was created, governed by an elected local board. The district covered the eastern part of the Chorley township, plus small adjoining parts of the Bollin Fee and Fulshaw townships. The Chorley district was renamed Alderley Edge in 1894.

In 1878, a separate Wilmslow local government district was created covering the remainder of Bollin Fee and Fulshaw, plus Pownall Fee apart from the area north of the River Bollin and River Dean; the excluded area north of the rivers contained the hamlet of Styal. Local government districts were reconstituted as urban districts under the Local Government Act 1894. Also in 1894, the civil parishes within the Wilmslow district were united into a single parish of Wilmslow, and Styal was made a separate parish.

On 1 April 1936, the urban district of Wilmslow was enlarged to take in Handforth and Styal. Wilmslow Urban District Council was granted a coat of arms on 21 June 1951.

Wilmslow Urban District was abolished in 1974 under the Local Government Act 1972. As part of those reforms, the area had been considered for possible inclusion within Greater Manchester, but it was ultimately decided to place it in the borough of Macclesfield. No successor parish was created for the former urban district and so it became unparished, being directly administered by Macclesfield Borough Council. In 2009, Cheshire East Council was created, taking over the functions of the borough council and Cheshire County Council, which were both abolished.

In 2011, the area of the former Wilmslow Urban District was split into three new parishes called Wilmslow, Handforth, and Styal.

== Demography ==
Wilmslow Compared
2001 UK Census	Wilmslow	Cheshire	England
Total population	25,498	673,781	49,138,831
White	95.9%	98.4%	90.9%
Asian	1.8%	0.5%	4.6%
Black	0.3%	0.2%	2.3%

=== Population and ethnicity ===
According to the 2001 United Kingdom census, the wards of Wilmslow North and Wilmslow South have a combined population of 25,498, of which 13,400 (52.5%) are females and 12,098 (47.5%) are males. In addition, 5,197 (20.4%) are aged 16 and under, while 4,780 (18.8%) are aged 65 and over.

Ethnic white groups (British, Irish, other) account for 95.9% of the population, with ethnic minority groups accounting for 4.1% of the population.

== Religion ==
A breakdown of religious groups and denominations:

- Christian – 76.7% (19,567 people)
- Muslim – 1.4% (363 people)
- Jewish – 0.7% (182 people)
- Hindu – 0.7% (168 people)
- Buddhist – 0.4% (94 people)
- Sikh – 0.2% (39 people)
- Any other religion – 0.2% (58 people)
- No religion – 13.3% (3,390 people)
- Religion not stated – 6.1% (1,555 people).

=== Places of worship ===
There are three Church of England churches in Wilmslow: St Bartholomew's, St Anne's and St John's. St Bartholomew's is a 16th-century building, which was modified in the 19th century; it has a turreted bell tower. The first rector of the church was a Thomas Dale, who is buried beneath a headstone presumably engraved by him outside the entrance to the church.

Wilmslow Methodist Church occupies a modern building close to the town centre, replacing an 1886 building which itself replaced the original 1798 church, built seven years after John Wesley's death.

The Sacred Heart & St Teresa's Church is the Roman Catholic church and dates from the late 19th century.

Dean Row Chapel, 2 miles (3.2 km) east of the town centre, is a Grade II* listed building built around the end of the 17th century. Initially Presbyterian, it is now a Unitarian chapel.

There is also a United Reformed Church in Wilmslow, close to the town centre.

== Geography ==
Wilmslow town centre is focused upon Bank Square, Grove Street and Water Lane. Although Bank Square has traditionally provided the location for many of the town's banks, the name in fact originates from the bank, or slope, leading down to the Carrs and up towards the railway station. The River Bollin flows through The Carrs Park and once provided the power source for nearby Quarry Bank Mill, now a National Trust site, and enjoyment for the local population.

Before the railway came in 1842, Wilmslow comprised only a few farms and a church.

For purposes of the Office for National Statistics, Wilmslow forms part of the Greater Manchester Urban Area.

== Economy ==
The town is part of the Golden Triangle together with Alderley Edge and Prestbury. It grew in popularity in the Victorian era as a desirable area for wealthy North West (most generally Manchester) merchants to move out to once the railways arrived and connected the towns.

Wilmslow is the founding location of sports equipment manufacturer Umbro, which has its headquarters in the area.

The town is a key location for Royal London, the mutual financial services company.

The Information Commissioner's Office, one of the government's executive agencies, is also based in Wilmslow. However, this organisation has announced that it will relocate to offices in Circle Square, Manchester, on the expiry of the lease at the Wilmslow site in autumn 2026.

The UK headquarters of Waters Corporation, an American manufacturer of analytical laboratory instruments, is located on Altrincham Road, at the site of Huntingdon Life Sciences' Stamford Lodge facility, which was demolished in 2012.

Wilmslow and its close surroundings are served by several car showrooms of notable marques.; these include Aston Martin, Porsche, Ferrari, Jaguar, Maserati, Land Rover, Bentley, McLaren, Rolls-Royce and Lamborghini. The town's Aston Martin dealership sells the highest number of Aston Martins in the UK; a high demand stimulated largely by the high level of affluence in the town.

== Transport ==
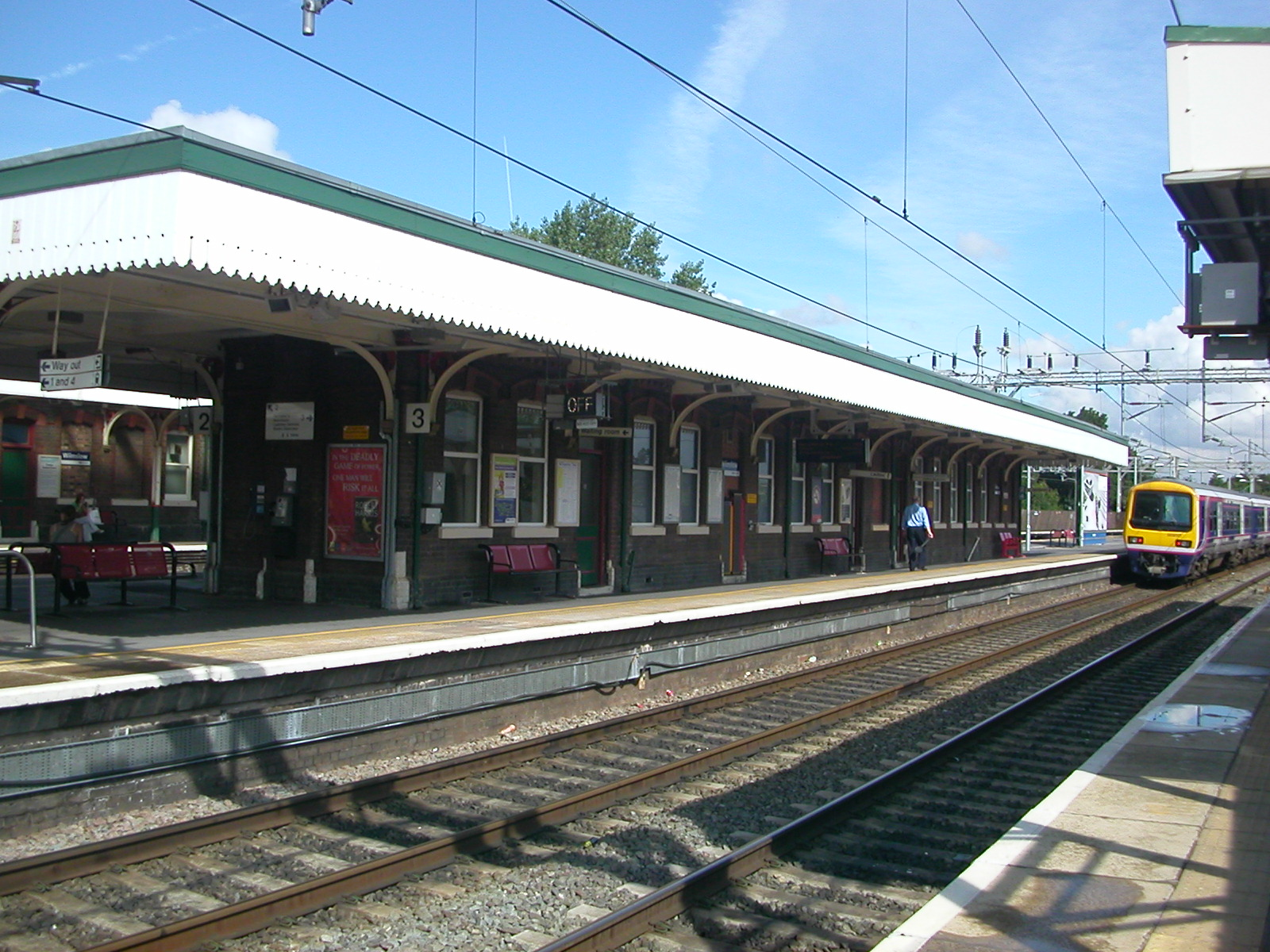
Wilmslow station

=== Railway ===
Wilmslow railway station lies on the Crewe to Manchester spur of the West Coast Main Line, via Stockport. The station is also a junction for the Styal Line, which takes a different route to Manchester Piccadilly, via Styal, Manchester Airport and Heald Green, but avoiding Stockport.

The station is served by three train operating companies:

- Avanti West Coast operates an hourly service between Manchester Piccadilly and London Euston, via Crewe
- Northern Trains operates regular local services to Manchester Piccadilly, Stockport, Manchester Airport, Alderley Edge and Crewe
- Transport for Wales operates an hourly service to Cardiff Central, via Crewe, Shrewsbury and Hereford; alternate services continue on to Carmarthen, Fishguard Harbour, Milford Haven or Pembroke Dock.

=== Buses ===
Wilmslow's main bus interchange is at Bank Square; it is served by D&G Bus, which provides services to Altrincham, Macclesfield, Manchester Airport and Handforth Dean.

There is also a free bus service, between Knutsford and Handforth Dean retail park.

=== Roads ===
The A34 road, which links Salford and Winchester, by-passes the town centre to the east; this was later extended around neighbouring Alderley Edge. It joins the A555 at Handforth Dean, which has been extended to Manchester Airport.

=== Air ===
Manchester Airport lies just 4 miles (6.4 km) along the A538 to the north-west, but Wilmslow lies away from the approach and departure routes; it therefore does not suffer from aircraft noise as Hale Barns and Heald Green do.

== Sport and recreation ==
The town has a number of parks, including The Carrs Park.

Wilmslow held its first Scarecrow Festival in July 2010 with 85 local businesses taking part and 93 different scarecrows. The week-long festival is organised by the Rotary Club of Wilmslow Dean and the members of the Wilmslow Business Group.

The Wilmslow Festive 10k, organised by Run North West, takes place at the end of November each year. The run starts in Wilmslow town centre, with 2,479 finishers in 2017. The Wilmslow Half Marathon is an annual half marathon road running race, established in 1984, and usually run in March.

== Media ==
Local news and television programmes are provided by BBC North West and ITV Granada. Television signals are received from the Winter Hill TV transmitter.

Local radio stations are BBC Radio Manchester, Heart North West, Smooth North West, Capital Manchester and Lancashire, Greatest Hits Radio Manchester & The North West, Silk Radio and Canalside Radio, a community based station.

The town is served by two local newspapers: the Wilmslow Express and the Knutsford Guardian.

== Notable people ==
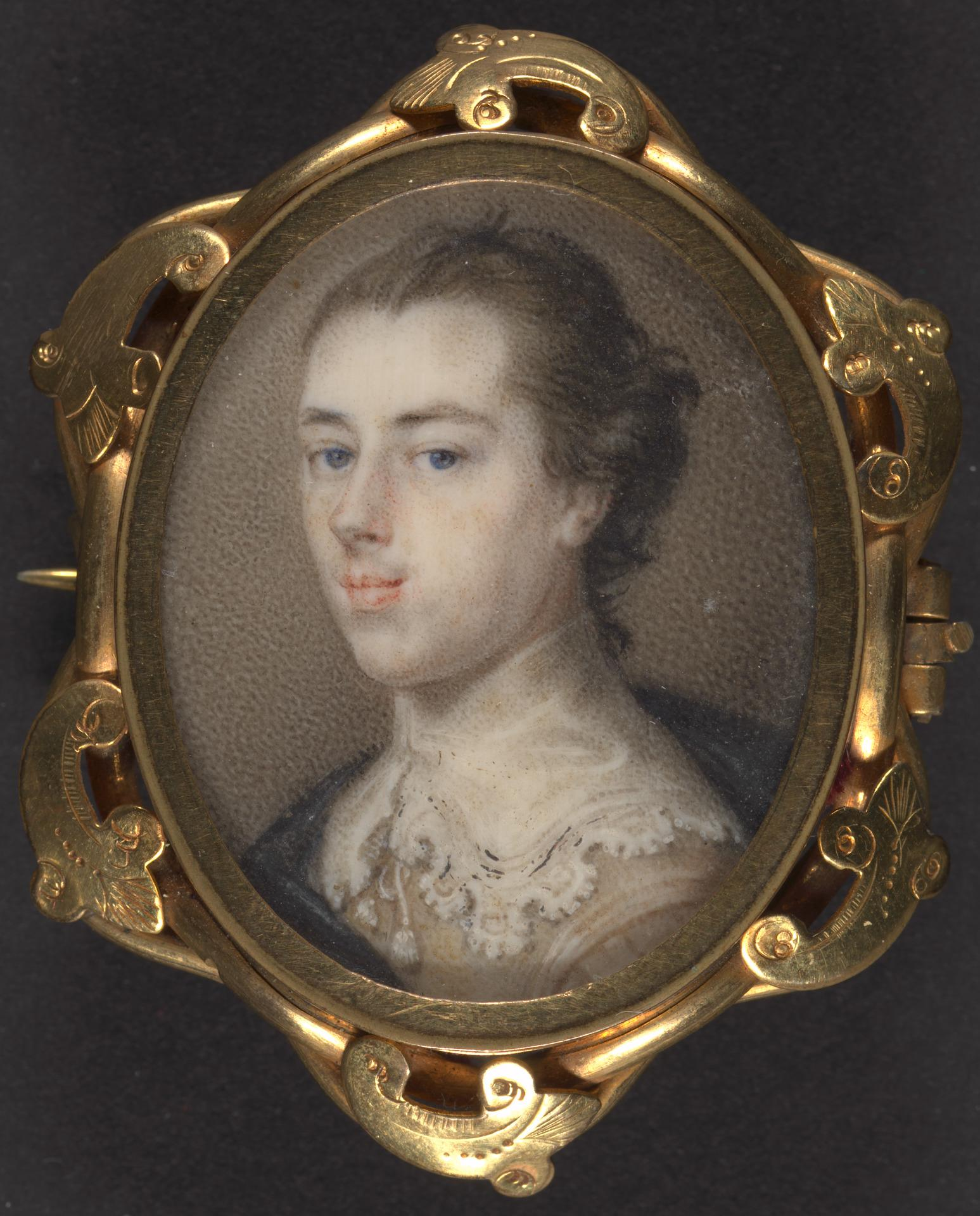
Samuel Finney

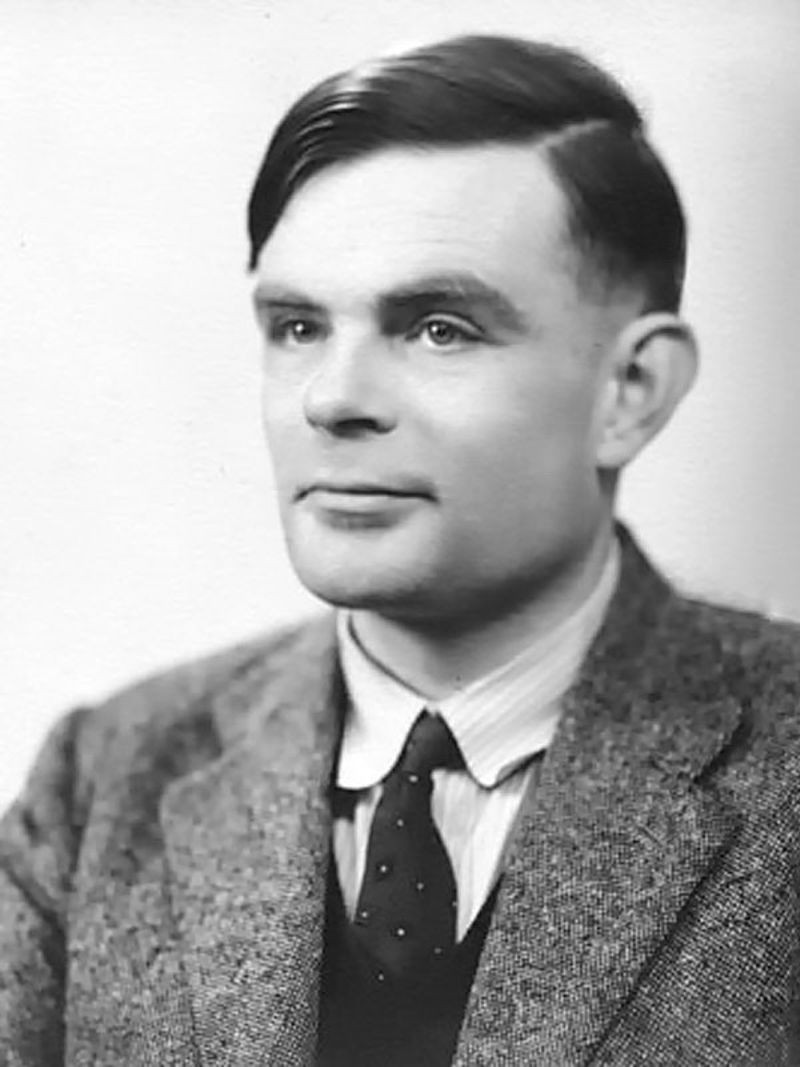
Alan Turing, 1951

- James Upton (1670 in Wilmslow–1749), an English clergyman, schoolmaster and literary editor.
- Samuel Finney (1719 in Wilmslow–1798), an English miniature painter.
- William Ewart Gladstone (1809–1898), politician, statesman and Prime Minister four separate times, lived at the Wilmslow Rectory between January and April 1828 to study under the supervision of Reverend John Turner
- James Tait (1863–1944 in Wilmslow), medieval historian, noted for his retiring, scholarly life in Wilmslow
- Thomas Barnes (1888–1964), lawyer and HM Procurator General and Treasury Solicitor 1934–1953
- Helen Tolson (1888–1955), suffragette, active in the Women's Social and Political Union
- Alan Turing (1912–1954 in Wilmslow), computer science pioneer and driving force behind the Bombe machine for cracking the German Enigma cypher, is perhaps Wilmslow's most notable resident; he died locally In 2004, a blue plaque was placed on his house in his honour
- Patrick George (1923 in Wilmslow–2016), an English painter who taught at the Slade School of Fine Art
- Roger Thatcher (1926–2010), a British statistician, spent his formative early years in Wilmslow
- Antony Grey (1927 in Wilmslow–2010), pioneer gay rights activist
- Ronald Brunskill (1929–2015), architectural historian
- Rod Davies (1930–2015), astronomer and cosmologist, president of the Royal Astronomical Society, and director of Jodrell Bank Observatory
- Peter Emerson Jones (born 1935), owner of the Emerson Group, a property business lives locally
- Richard Evans (born 1945 in Wilmslow), a graphic designer, photographer and illustrator
- Iqbal Ahmed (born 1956), the owner and CEO of the Seamark Group's Asian food business, based in Manchester, lives in Wilmslow
- John Harris (born 1969 in Wilmslow), a British journalist, writer and critic.

=== Acting and broadcasting ===
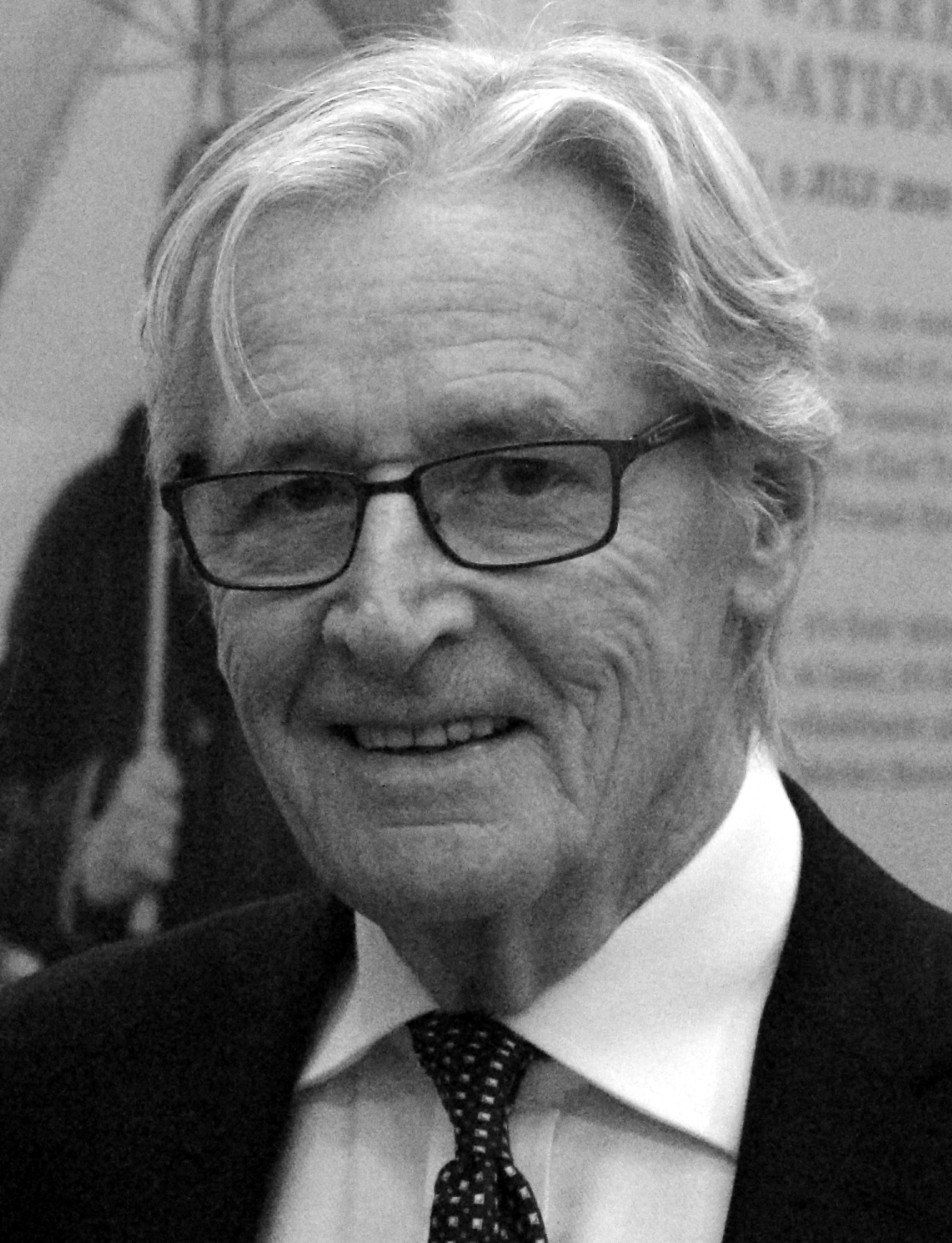
William Roache, 2017

- Stuart Hall (born 1929), a TV presenter convicted of indecent assault, lived in Wilmslow from 1958 to 2013
- William Roache (born 1932) actor, plays Ken Barlow in Coronation Street since 1960; he has lived in Wilmslow for most of his adult life
- John Waite (born 1951), a presenter on British radio and TV, attended Wilmslow High School
- Barbara Wilshere (born 1959), an actress appearing in theatre, films and on TV, attended Wilmslow High School
- Jo Wheeler (born 1963), weather forecaster for Sky News, attended Wilmslow High School
- Fionnuala Ellwood (born 1964), an actress, portrayed Lynn Whiteley in the ITV soap Emmerdale, attended Wilmslow High School
- Miranda Sawyer (born 1967), journalist and broadcaster, and her brother Toby (born 1969), actor, grew up locally
- Chris Hawkins (born 1975), presenter and journalist, and his wife Clare Nasir (born 1970), meteorologist, have lived locally since 2012
- Simon Gregson (born 1974), actor who plays taxi boss Steve McDonald in Coronation Street
- Ashley Taylor Dawson (born 1982), actor and singer, plays Darren Osborne in the Channel 4 soap opera Hollyoaks.

=== Music ===
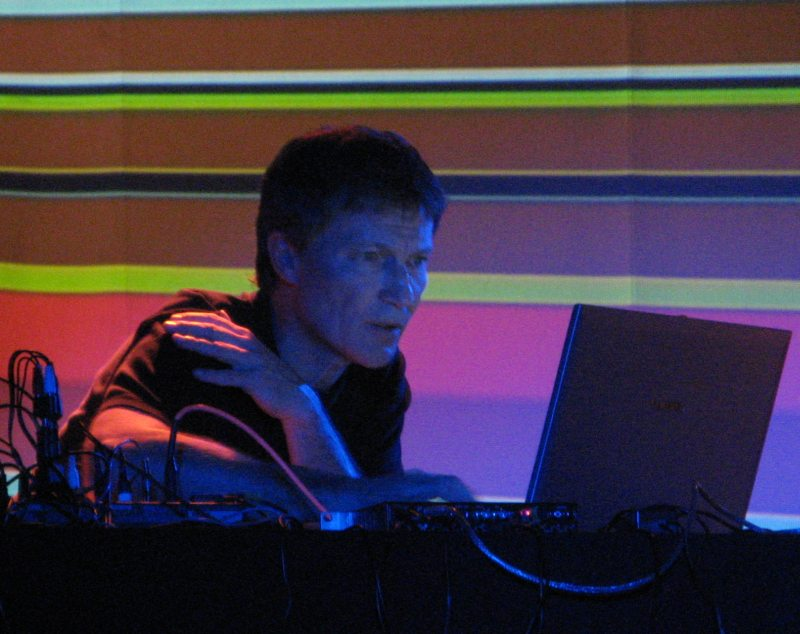
Michael Rother, 2007

- Syd Lawrence (1923 in Wilmslow–1998), a talented trumpet player and bandleader
- Michael Rother (born 1950), founder of Krautrock legends Neu!, lived in Wilmslow as a 9-year-old
- Christopher Gayford (born 1963 in Wilmslow), a conductor, currently with the City of Sheffield Youth Orchestra
- Doves, an Indie rock band, met at Wilmslow High School in the 1980s. Their song "Black and White Town" was inspired by Wilmslow and its contradicting 'rich-poor' divide
- The 1975, a pop rock band formed in 2002 at Wilmslow High School, included guitarist Adam Hann, drummer and lead vocalist Matty Healy, bassist Ross MacDonald, and George Daniel a later drummer.

=== Sport ===
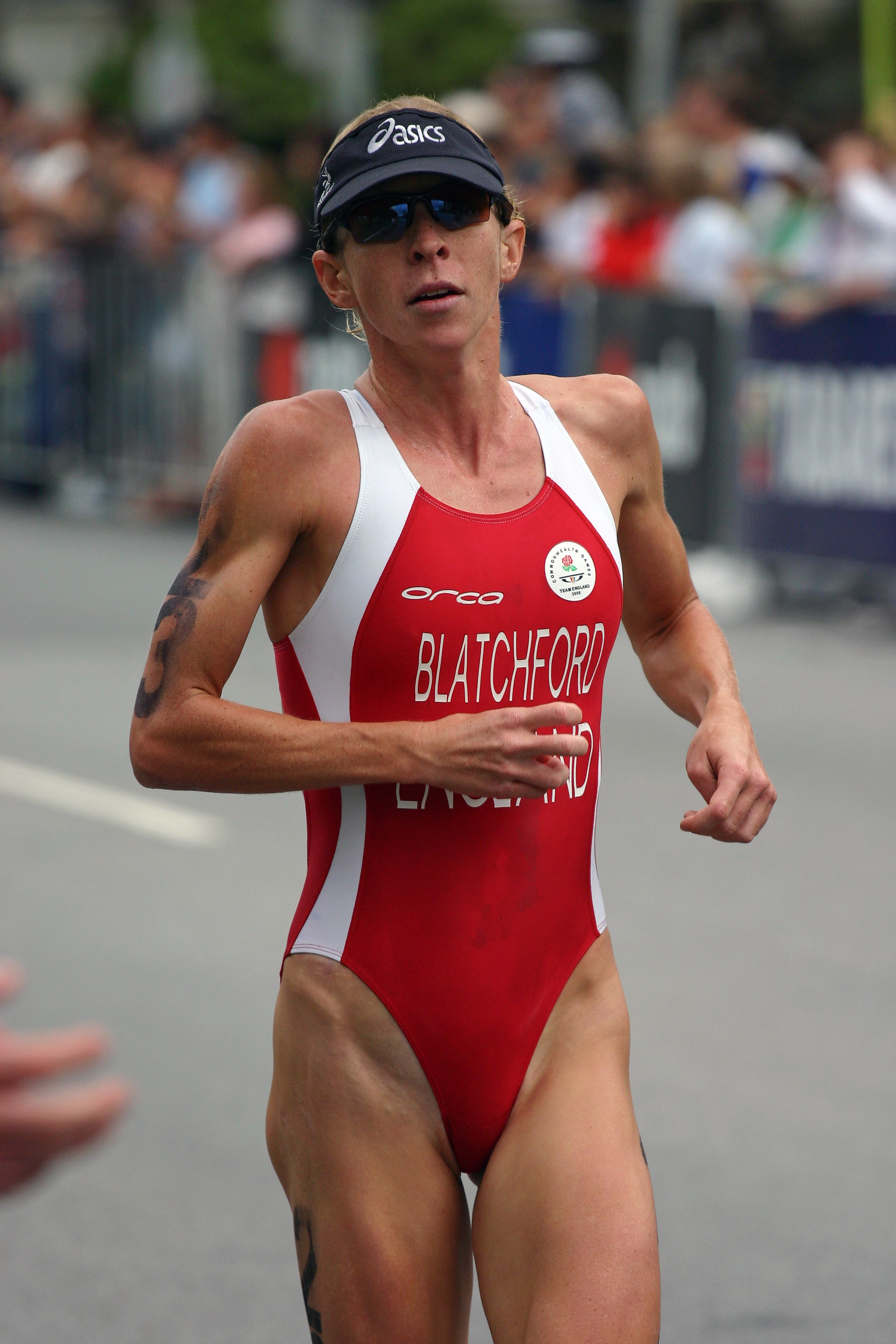
Liz Blatchford, 2006

- Len Butt (1910–1994), footballer, who played over 370 games, including 150 for Macclesfield Town
- Alex Ferguson (born 1941), former footballer who played 317 league games and manager of Manchester United for 26 years
- Chris Nicholl (1946–2024), footballer who played 706 games
- Terry Nicholl (born 1952 in Wilmslow), footballer, played over 450 games
- Andy Fanshawe (1963–1992), a British mountaineer, attended Wilmslow Grammar School
- Liz Blatchford (born 1980 in Wilmslow), professional triathlete
- Danny Whitaker (born 1980 in Wilmslow), footballer, played 671 games, including 400 for Macclesfield Town
- Park Ji-sung (born 1981), footballer, played 318 games and 134 league games for Manchester United
- David Horsey (born 1985), golfer who currently plays on the European Tour, lives in Wilmslow
- Seren Bundy-Davies (born 1994), track and field sprinter at 400 metres, attended Wilmslow High School
- Sam James (born 1994 in Wilmslow), rugby union player who has played over 250 games; currently with Sale Sharks
- Millie Turner (born 1996 in Wilmslow), football defender, who has played 180 games for Women's Super League club Manchester United

== See also ==
- George Bramwell Evens
- Listed buildings in Wilmslow
- RAF Wilmslow
- Wilmslow Hockey Club
