= River Bollin =

Tributary of the River Mersey in north-west England

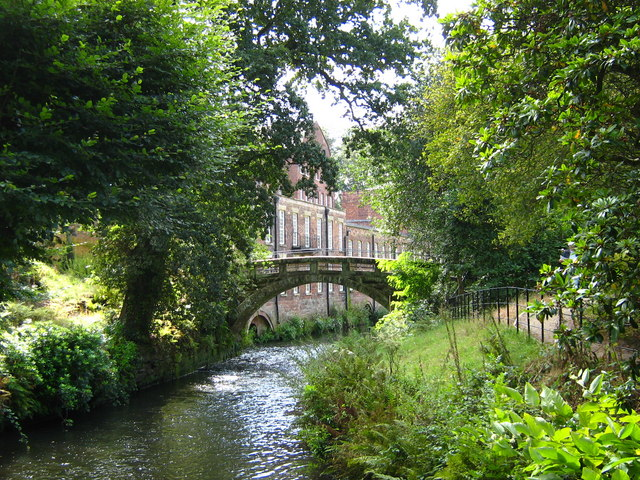
- The River Bollin alongside Quarry Bank Mill

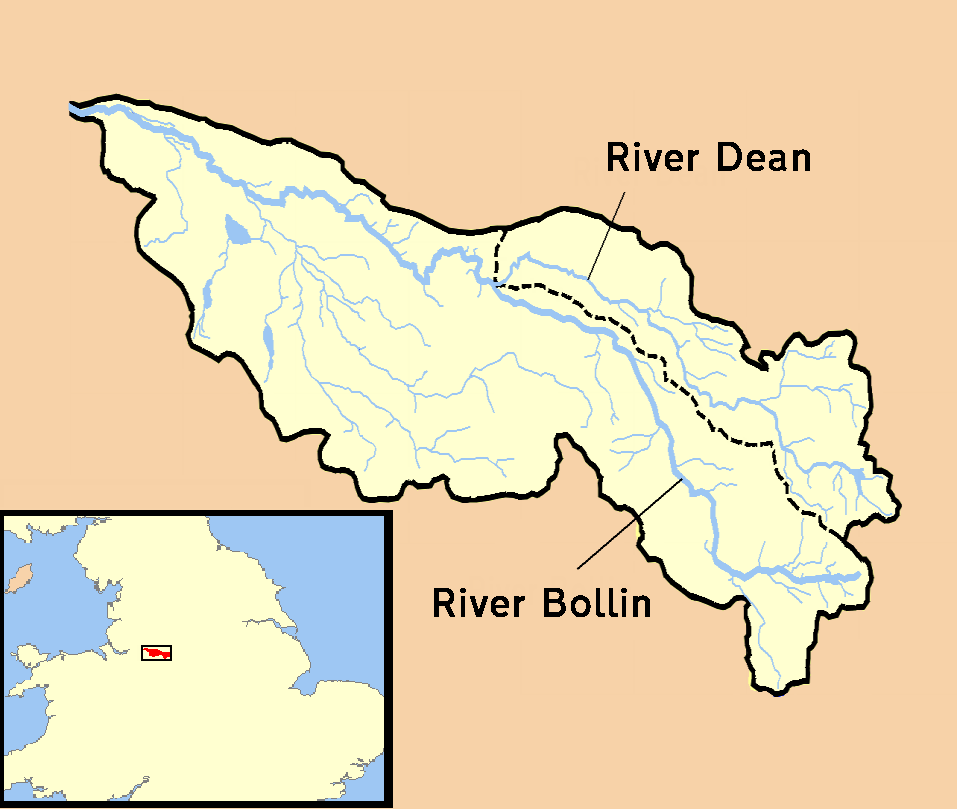
- The River Bollin and its tributaries within its catchment area. The direction of flow is east to west. Also shown is the sub-catchment area of the River Dean.

Location
- Country: England
- Counties: Cheshire, Greater Manchester

Physical characteristics
- Source
  - location: Macclesfield Forest, Cheshire
  - coordinates: 53.2418°N 2.0397°W
  - elevation: 300 m (980 ft)
- Mouth: Manchester Ship Canal
  - location: Warburton, Greater Manchester
  - coordinates: 53.3961°N 2.4786°W
  - elevation: 11 m (36 ft)
- Length: 49 km (30 mi)

Basin features
- Tributaries
  - right: River Dean

The River Bollin is a major tributary of the River Mersey in the north-west of England. It flows for about 30 miles from its source in the Pennine foothills through Macclesfield, Wilmslow, passing under Manchester Airport, before flowing into the Mersey section of the Manchester Ship Canal at Warburton.

== Route ==
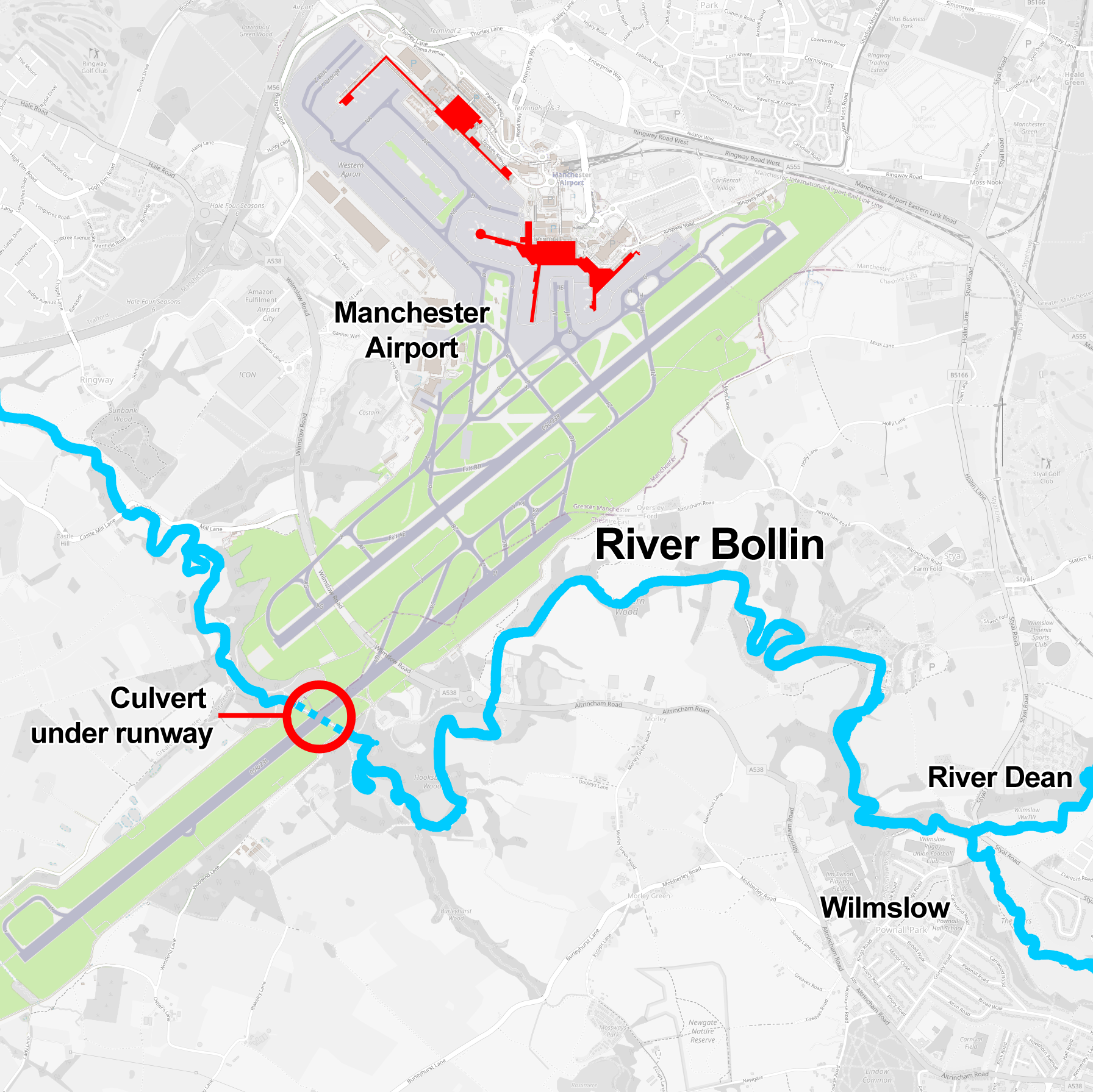
The route of the Bollin near Manchester Airport

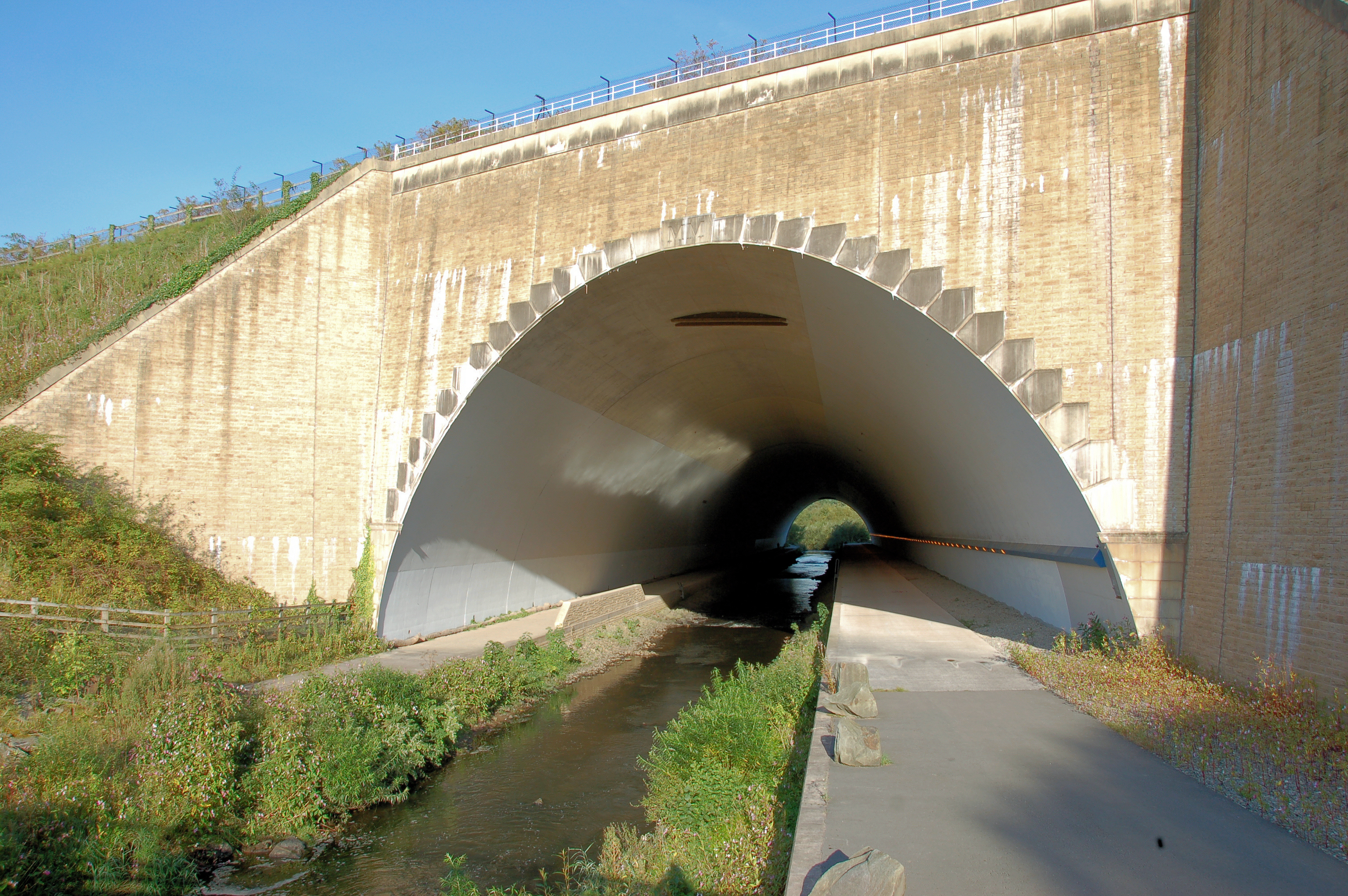
The Bollin culvert under the southern runway of Manchester Airport

Along with the River Weaver and the River Gowy, the River Bollin is one of the three main tributaries of the Mersey in Cheshire.

The Bollin rises at the western end of the Peak District, from springs near the Buxton to Macclesfield road. The stream descends the 10 miles (16 km) through Macclesfield and The Carrs Park in Wilmslow, where a silk mill once stood by the river. Just to the north of Wilmslow railway station the Styal railway line crosses the Bollin via a pair of brick viaducts, one built by the Manchester and Birmingham Railway in 1842 and a later bridge erected in 1909. Near Styal Prison it has a confluence with the River Dean, which rises in Macclesfield Forest.

The Bollin flows through the Styal country park and passes alongside Quarry Bank Mill. This mill opened in 1784 and is a noted example of a textile factory of the Industrial Revolution. The machinery for manufacturing cotton calico was powered by water wheels driven by the flow of the River Bollin. Today, the mill is preserved as a National Trust visitor attraction. Near the Quarry Bank Mill site there is a natural weir.

To the west of Styal, the Bollin flows to the south of Manchester Airport. Between 1997 and 2000, the airport underwent expansion work and the runways were extended. To accommodate the longer runways, the River Bollin was diverted via a culvert underneath the southern runway.

For its final 10 miles (16 km) it defines the southwestern portion of the border between Greater Manchester and Cheshire. To the south of Hale, the Bollin valley is crossed by the Mid-Cheshire railway line. Below Bowdon, the River Birkin, Mobberley Brook and streams coming from Rostherne Mere and Tatton Meres enter the Bollin. After Bowdon, the river flows through the village of Little Bollington; a similarly named town, Bollington, lies further upstream near Macclesfield, but this town lies on the River Dean before its junction with the Bollin.

The Bollin merges with the Mersey and the Manchester Ship Canal at Rixton Junction just north of Lymm.

The town of Macclesfield used to dispose of all its waste and sewage into the Bollin. The profusion of human sewage in the Bollin was still common in 1850. Efforts to clean up the Mersey and its tributaries led to the return of the Atlantic salmon to the Mersey, Bollin and Goyt. In 2025, salmon parr were found in the Bollin for the first time since 2015.

== Tributaries ==
- Agden Brook (L)
  - Millington Clough
- Birkin Brook (L)
  - Blackburn's Brook (L)
    - Shawgreen Brook (L)
    - Rostherne Brook
  - Mopperley Brook (R)
    - Mobberley Brook
      - Swim Brook (R)
      - Whim Brook (R)
      - Whitehall Brook (R)
        - Pott Brook (R)
    - Sugar Brook (R)
  - Tatton Mere brook (L)
  - Pedley Brook (R)
  - Marthall Brook

== Bollin Valley Way ==
The Bollin Valley Way is a 25-mile (40 km) footpath which follows the route of the River Bollin from Macclesfield Riverside Park to the Manchester Ship Canal at Partington.
