= List of schools in Manchester =

This is a list of schools in Manchester, England.

In 2010, the Manchester Local Education Authority was ranked last out of Greater Manchester's ten LEAs – and 147th out of 150 in the country LEAs – based on the percentage of pupils attaining at least five A*–C grades at General Certificate of Secondary Education (GCSE) including maths and English (38.6 per cent compared with the national average of 50.7 per cent). The LEA also had the highest occurrence of absences, with 11.11 per cent of "half day sessions missed by pupils", above the national average of 5.8 per cent. Of the schools in the LEA with 30 or more pupils, four had 90 per cent or more pupils achieving at least five A*–C grades at GCSE including maths and English (Manchester High School for Girls, St Bede's College, Manchester Islamic High School for Girls, and The King David High School) while three managed 25 per cent or below (Plant Hill Arts College, North Manchester High School for Boys, Brookway High School and Sports College).

== State-funded schools ==
=== Primary schools ===
- Abbey Hey Primary Academy, Gorton
- Abbott Community Primary School, Collyhurst
- Abraham Moss Community School, Crumpsall
- Acacias Community Primary School, Burnage
- All Saints CE Primary School, Newton Heath
- All Saints Primary School, Gorton
- Alma Park Primary School, Levenshulme
- Armitage CE Primary School, Ardwick
- Ashbury Meadow Primary School, Beswick
- Baguley Hall Primary School, Baguley
- Barlow Hall Primary School, Chorlton-cum-Hardy
- Beaver Road Primary School, Didsbury
- Benchill Primary School, Wythenshawe
- Birchfields Primary School, Fallowfield
- Bowker Vale Primary School, Higher Crumpsall
- Briscoe Lane Academy, Newton Heath
- Broad Oak Primary School, East Didsbury
- Brookburn Community School, Chorlton-cum-Hardy
- Button Lane Primary School, Northern Moor
- Cavendish Primary School, West Didsbury
- Chapel Street Community Primary School, Levenshulme
- Charlestown Community Primary School, Blackley
- Cheetham CE Community Academy, Cheetham Hill
- Cheetwood Primary School, Cheetham Hill
- Chorlton CE Primary School, Chorlton-cum-Hardy
- Chorlton Park Primary, Chorlton-cum-Hardy
- Christ The King RC Primary School, Newton Heath
- Claremont Primary School, Moss Side
- CE School of The Resurrection, Beswick
- Co-op Academy Broadhurst, Moston
- Crab Lane Primary School, Higher Blackley
- Cravenwood Primary Academy, Crumpsall
- Cringle Brook Primary School, Levenshulme
- Crossacres Primary Academy, Wythenshawe
- Crosslee Community Primary School, Blackley
- Crowcroft Park Primary School, Longsight
- Crumpsall Lane Primary School, Crumpsall
- Didsbury CE Primary School, Didsbury
- The Divine Mercy RC Primary School, Rusholme
- E-ACT Blackley Academy, Blackley
- Gorton Primary School, Gorton
- Green End Primary School, Burnage
- Haveley Hey Community School, Benchill
- Heald Place Primary School, Rusholme
- Higher Openshaw Community School, Higher Openshaw
- Holy Name RC Primary School, Moss Side
- Holy Trinity CE Primary School, Blackley
- Irk Valley Community School, Lower Crumpsall
- King David Primary School, Crumpsall
- Ladybarn Primary School, Withington
- Lily Lane Primary School, Moston
- Longsight Community Primary, Longsight
- Manchester Communications Primary Academy, Harpurhey
- Manley Park Primary School, Whalley Range
- Mauldeth Road Primary School, Withington
- Medlock Primary School, Ardwick / Chorlton-on-Medlock
- Moston Fields Primary School, Moston
- Moston Lane Community Primary School, Moston
- Mount Carmel RC Primary School, Blackley
- New Islington Free School, Ancoats
- New Moston Primary School, New Moston
- Newall Green Primary School, Wythenshawe
- Northenden Community School, Northenden
- Oasis Academy Aspinal, Gorton
- Oasis Academy Harpur Mount, Harpurhey
- Oasis Academy Temple, Cheetham Hill
- Old Hall Drive Academy, Gorton
- Old Moat Primary School, Withington
- Oswald Road Primary School, Chorlton-cum-Hardy
- Our Lady's RC Primary School, Whalley Range
- Park View Community Primary, Miles Platting
- Peel Hall Primary School, Wythenshawe
- Pike Fold Primary School, Blackley
- Plymouth Grove Primary School, Chorlton-on-Medlock
- Rack House Primary School, Northern Moor
- Ravensbury Community School, Clayton
- Ringway Primary School, Wythenshawe
- Rolls Crescent Primary School, Hulme
- Rushbrook Primary Academy, Gorton
- Sacred Heart RC Primary School, Baguley
- Sacred Heart RC Primary School, Gorton
- St Agnes CE Primary School, Longsight
- St Aidan's RC Primary School, Northern Moor
- St Ambrose RC Primary School, Chorlton-cum-Hardy
- St Andrew's CE Primary School, Levenshulme
- St Anne's RC Primary School, Ancoats
- St Anne's RC Primary School, Crumpsall
- St Anthony's RC Primary School, Wythenshawe
- St Augustine's CE Primary School, Monsall
- St Barnabas CE Primary Academy, Openshaw
- St Bernard's RC Primary School, Burnage
- St Brigid's RC Primary School, Beswick
- St Catherine's RC Primary School, Didsbury
- St Chad's RC Primary School, Cheetham Hill
- St Chrysostom's CE Primary School, Chorlton-on-Medlock
- St Clare's RC Primary School, Higher Blackley
- St Clement's CE Primary School, Higher Openshaw
- St Cuthbert's RC Primary School, Withington
- St Dunstan's RC Primary School, Moston
- St Edmund's RC Primary School, Miles Platting
- St Elizabeth's RC Primary School, Wythenshawe
- St Francis RC Primary School, Gorton
- St James' CE Primary School, Birch-in-Rusholme
- St James' CE Primary School, Gorton
- St John Bosco RC Primary School, Blackley
- St John's RC Primary School, Chorlton-cum-Hardy
- St John's CE Primary School, Longsight
- St Joseph's RC Primary School, Longsight
- St Kentigern's RC Primary School, Fallowfield
- St Luke's CE Primary School, Longsight
- St Malachy's RC Primary School, Collyhurst
- St Margaret Mary's RC Primary School, New Moston
- St Margaret's CE Primary School, Whalley Range
- St Mary's CE Junior and Infant School, Moss Side
- St Mary's CE Primary School, Moston
- St Mary's RC Primary School, Levenshulme
- St Patrick's RC Primary School, Collyhurst
- St Paul's CE Primary School, Withington
- St Peter's RC Primary School, Newall Green
- St Philip's CE Primary School, Hulme
- St Richard's RC Primary School, Longsight
- St Wilfrid's CE Junior and Infant School, Newton Heath
- St Wilfrid's CE Primary School, Northenden
- St Wilfrid's RC Primary School, Hulme
- St Willibrord's RC Primary School, Clayton
- SS John Fisher and Thomas More Catholic Primary School, Benchill
- Sandilands Primary School, Wythenshawe
- Saviour CE Primary School, Collyhurst
- Seymour Road Academy, Clayton
- Stanley Grove Primary Academy, Longsight
- Unity Community Primary, Crumpsall / Cheetham Hill
- Varna Community Primary School, Openshaw
- Webster Primary School, Moss Side
- West Didsbury CE Primary School, West Didsbury
- Wilbraham Primary School, Fallowfield
- William Hulme's Grammar School, Whalley Range
- The Willows Primary School, Wythenshawe

=== Secondary schools ===
- Abraham Moss Community School, Crumpsall
- The Barlow RC High School, East Didsbury
- Burnage Academy for Boys, Burnage
- Cedar Mount Academy, Gorton
- Chorlton High School, Chorlton-cum-Hardy
- CHS South, Chorlton-cum-Hardy
- Co-op Academy Belle Vue, Openshaw
- Co-op Academy Manchester, Higher Blackley
- Co-op Academy North Manchester, Blackley
- Dean Trust Ardwick, Ardwick
- Didsbury High School, West Didsbury
- Dixons Brooklands Academy, Wythenshawe
- Dixons Newall Green Academy, Newall Green
- The East Manchester Academy, Beswick
- Eden Boys' Leadership Academy, Manchester, Crumpsall / Cheetham Hill
- Eden Girls' Leadership Academy, Manchester, Crumpsall / Cheetham Hill
- King David High School, Crumpsall
- Levenshulme High School, Levenshulme
- Loreto High School, Chorlton-cum-Hardy
- Manchester Academy, Moss Side
- Manchester Communication Academy, Harpurhey
- Manchester Enterprise Academy, Wythenshawe
- Manchester Enterprise Academy Central, Levenshulme
- Our Lady's RC High School, Higher Blackley
- Parrs Wood High School, East Didsbury
- St Matthew's RC High School, Moston
- St Paul's RC High School, Newall Green
- St Peter's RC High School, Longsight
- Trinity CE High School, Hulme
- Whalley Range High School, Whalley Range
- William Hulme's Grammar School, Whalley Range
- Wright Robinson College, Gorton

=== Special and alternative schools ===
- Ashgate Specialist Support Primary School, Wythenshawe
- The Birches School, West Didsbury
- Bridgelea Pupil Referral Unit, Withington
- Camberwell Park Specialist Support School, Moston
- Grange School, Gorton
- Lancasterian School, West Didsbury
- Manchester Hospital School, Chorlton-on-Medlock
- Manchester Secondary PRU, Chorlton-cum-Hardy
- Meade Hill School, Higher Blackley
- Melland High School, Gorton
- North Ridge High School, Blackley
- Pioneer House High School, Northern Moor
- Piper Hill High School, Newall Green
- Prospect House Specialist Support Primary School, Gorton
- Rodney House School, Longsight
- Southern Cross School, Chorlton-cum-Hardy

=== Further education ===
- Co-operative College, Manchester
- Connell Sixth Form College, Beswick
- Loreto College, Hulme
- Royal Northern College of Music, Chorlton-on-Medlock
- The Manchester College, Ardwick / Spinningfields / Harpurhey / Openshaw / West Didsbury / Northenden / Wythenshawe
- Xaverian College, Rusholme

== Independent schools ==
=== Primary and preparatory schools ===
- Manchester Muslim Preparatory School, Withington
- Moor Allerton Preparatory School, West Didsbury

=== Senior and all-through schools ===
- Abbey College, Manchester city centre
- Chetham's School of Music, Manchester city centre
- Kassim Darwish Grammar School for Boys, Chorlton-cum-Hardy
- King of Kings School, Manchester city centre
- Manchester Grammar School, Rusholme
- Manchester High School for Girls, Fallowfield
- Manchester Islamic High School for Girls, Didsbury
- St Bede's College, Whalley Range
- Sol Christian Academy, Piccadilly
- TLG Manchester, Harpurhey
- Withington Girls' School, Fallowfield

=== Special and alternative schools ===
- The Greens ENS, Newton Heath
- Harpurhey Alternative Provision School, Harpurhey
- IncludED, Whalley Range
- Manchester Jewish School for Special Education, Cheetham Hill
- Manchester Vocational and Learning Academy, Levenshulme
- Music Stuff, Openshaw
- Progress Schools, Gorton
- TLG Manchester, Harpurhey

=== Further education ===
- Communicate School, Manchester
