= Northern Moor =

Suburb of Manchester, England

Coordinates: 53°25′N 2°16′W

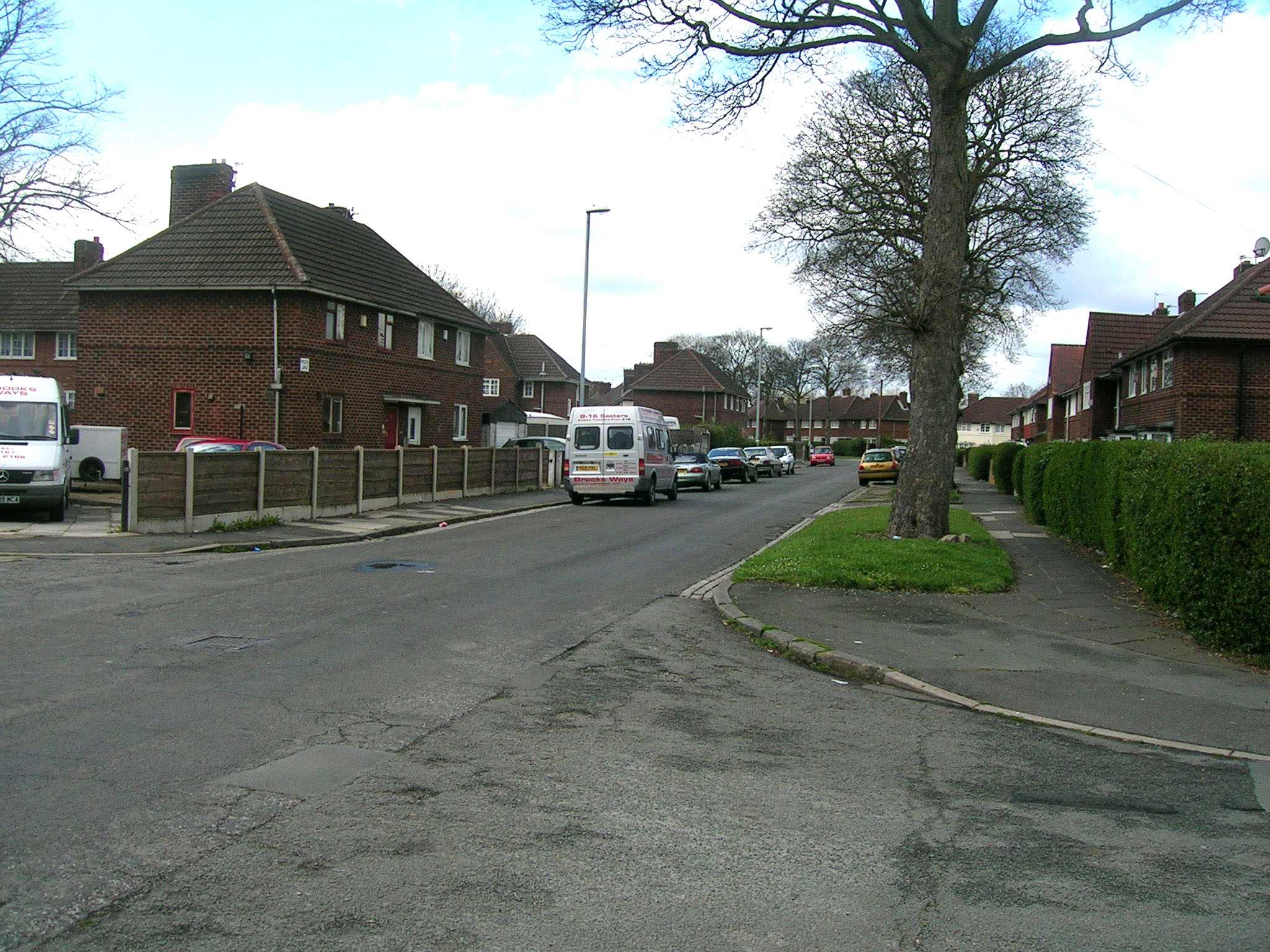
Moor Lane

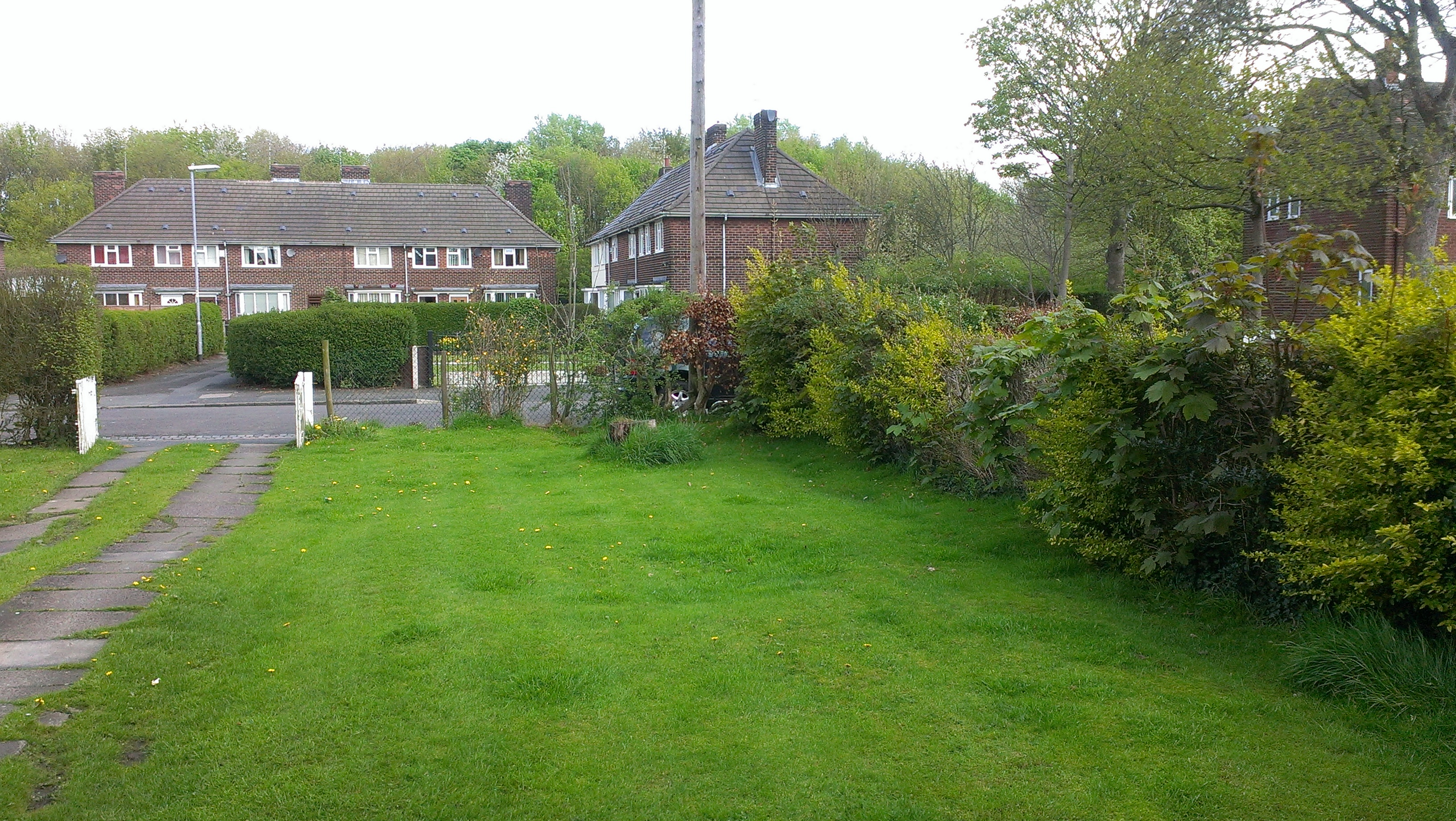
Barry Road

Northern Moor is an area of Manchester, England, north of Baguley, west of Northenden and east of Sale, 5 miles south of Manchester city centre. The Tatton family lived from 1540 to 1926 at Wythenshawe Hall in Northern Moor; land around it is now Wythenshawe Park, which was a deer park from 1200 to 1540. In former centuries it was spelt "Northen Moor" and meant "the moor area belonging to Northenden". Until 1931, Northern Moor was part of Cheshire, before Manchester expanded south of the River Mersey and its borders were changed to include Northern Moor and Northenden. The area includes Lawton Moor, and the northern border is now with Sale Moor.

The area has grown since the 1930s and 1940s to cover the area of the old Tatton family estate and farms.

In 1926, Mr.Tatton (country squire at Wythenshawe Hall) sold land in Wythenshawe, and it came into the hands of Manchester Corporation, which chose four farm fields in Northern Moor to be the Manchester (Wythenshawe) Aerodrome. Its runway opened in early 1929, with the old farm house used for offices. The airfield closed a few years later, moved to Eccles and became Barton Airport. The land was redeveloped with Rackhouse School opening in 1935, St. Michael's Church in 1937, St Aidan's Catholic School in 1938, and houses built in the 1930s and 1940s on the land. Northern Moor has grown further since, expanding to the Sale border. The Kerscott estate was a fruit farm with apple and plum trees. The area is now part of the Wythenshawe and Sale East Parliament constituency.

== TV programmes ==
The ITV documentary seriesThe Duchess On The Estate, filmed between February and July 2009 in Northern Moor, was shown on TV on Tuesday 18 August and Tuesday 25 August 2009.

The ITV soapCoronation street was filmed for a number of weeks on location in Northern Moor including the Park Pub, the Pub car park and roads in the area. This was for the story line with Callum Logan and David Platt, in the run up to the live episode in September 2015.

== Education ==
Primary schools in the area include Rack House Primary School (opened 1937), St. Aidan's Primary School (opened 1938) and Button Lane Primary School. Marcus Rashford, the Manchester United football player, was a student at Button Lane.

Dixons Brooklands Academy is the nearest secondary school serving Northern Moor. It is located on the south border of the area.

Pioneer House High School is a special school located in the area.

Northern Moor was also home to the Northenden campus of The Manchester College. This was formerly Yew Tree High School. It closed in 2022 and is being turned into a housing estate.

== Transport ==
Tram: Northern Moor has two tram stops: Northern Moor Metrolink station and Wythenshawe park Metro station, both on the Manchester Airport line, services every 12 minutes to Manchester Victoria tramstop. This line opened in 2015.

Northern Moor is on the 41 bus route linking Sale and Manchester. Northern Moor is also on the number 19 bus route (to Manchester Airport) and the 108 route (to Wythenshawe Hospital). Northern Moor has road links with both the M60 and M56 motorways. Manchester Airport is a 10-minute drive away.

== Religion ==
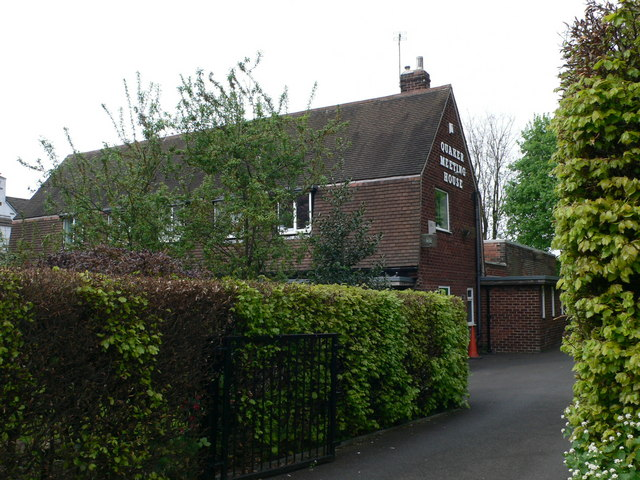
The Quaker meeting house

Local churches include Lawton Moor Methodist Church, St. Michael's Anglican church (Lawton Moor), St Aidan's Roman Catholic church and Northern Moor Community Church.

St Aidan's Catholic school opened in 1938 with the church being built in 1955. St. Michael Church is a Grade II listed building and opened in 1937, the Church building was built in a shape of a star.

== Economy ==
Northern Moor has two main shopping areas, a restaurant and two pubs. One shopping area is Sale Circle, and the other is Moorcroft.

Northern Moor is mainly a residential area and most working people who live there travel to Manchester Airport, Manchester, Sale or Warrington to work.

== Notable past residents ==
- Caroline Aherne, actress
- Billy Duffy, musician
- Steve Hanley, musician
- Syd Little, comedian
- Desmond Noonan, gangster
- Marcus Rashford, Manchester United footballer
- Marc Riley. bass guitarist and guitarist in The Fall and DJ on BBC Radio 6 Music
- Kirsty Howard, children's hospice advocate and activist known for her fundraising work for Francis House Children's Hospice
