= Wythenshawe =

Area of South Manchester, England

Coordinates: 53.392°N 2.264°W

- Suburb
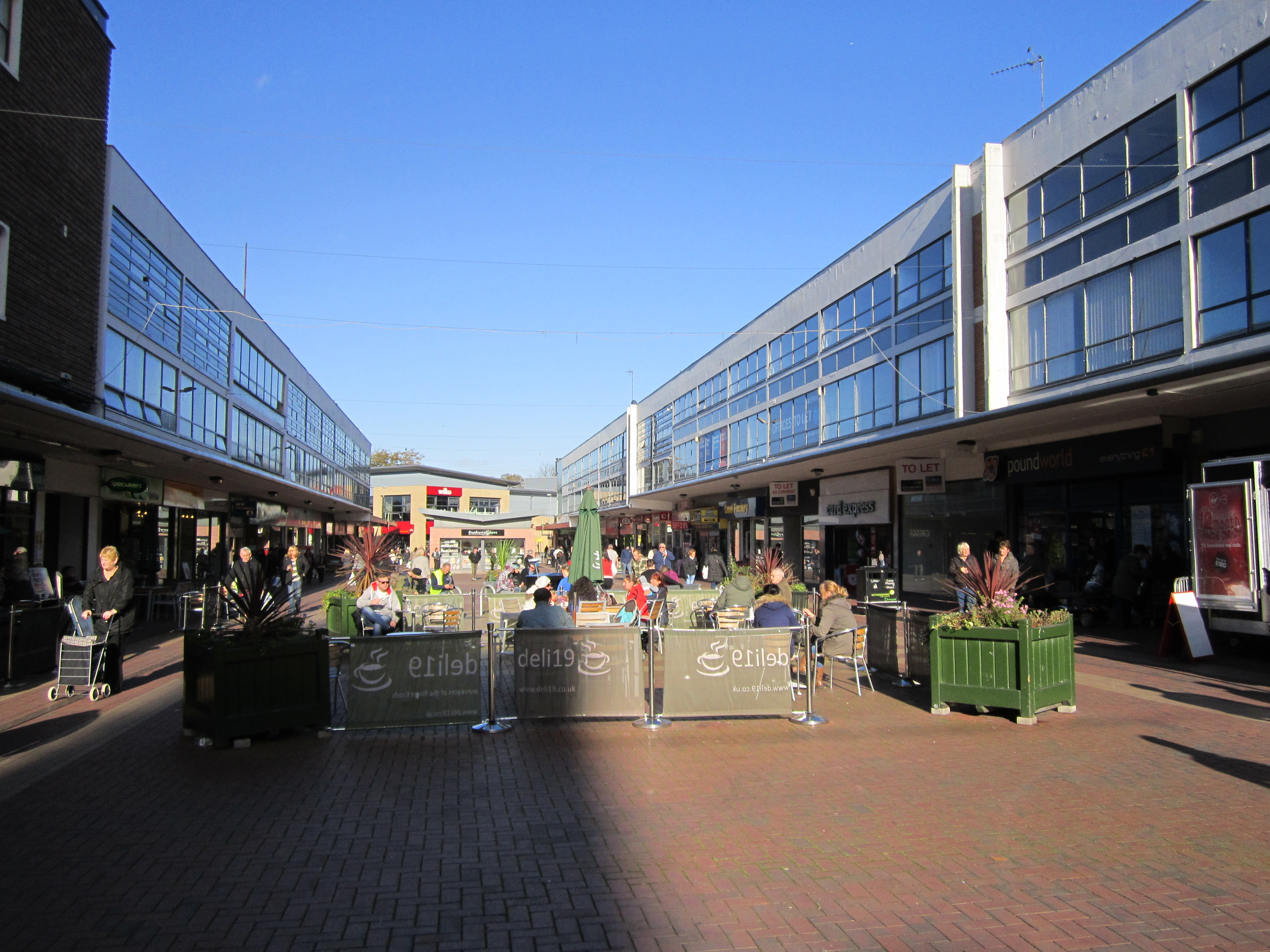
- Civic Centre

- Location within Greater Manchester
- Population: 97,635
- OS grid reference: SJ824884
- Metropolitan borough: Manchester
- Metropolitan county: Greater Manchester
- Region: North West
- Country: England
- Sovereign state: United Kingdom
- Post town: Manchester
- Postcode district: M22 and M23
- Dialling code: 0161
- Police: Greater Manchester
- Fire: Greater Manchester
- Ambulance: North West
- UK Parliament: Wythenshawe and Sale East

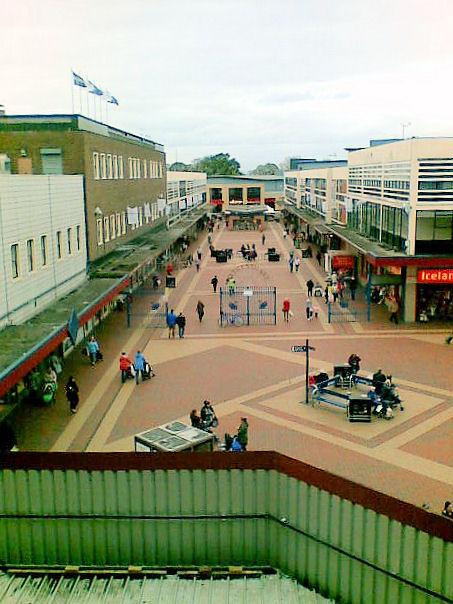
View of Civic Centre from ASDA car park

Wythenshawe (/ˈwɪðənʃɔː/) is an area of Manchester, England. Historically part of Cheshire, in 1931 Wythenshawe was transferred to the City of Manchester, which had begun building a large housing estate there in the 1920s. With an area of approximately 11 square miles (28 km^{2}), Wythenshawe became the largest council estate in Europe.

Wythenshawe includes the areas of Baguley, Benchill, Peel Hall, Newall Green, Woodhouse Park, Moss Nook, Northern Moor, Northenden and Sharston.

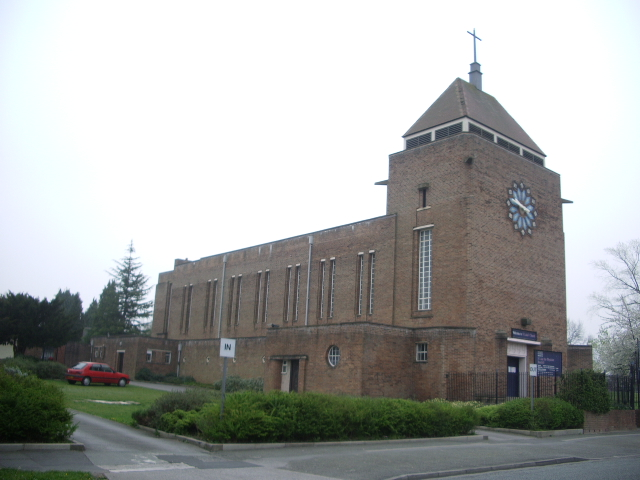
St Luke the Physician Church, Brownley Rd

== History ==
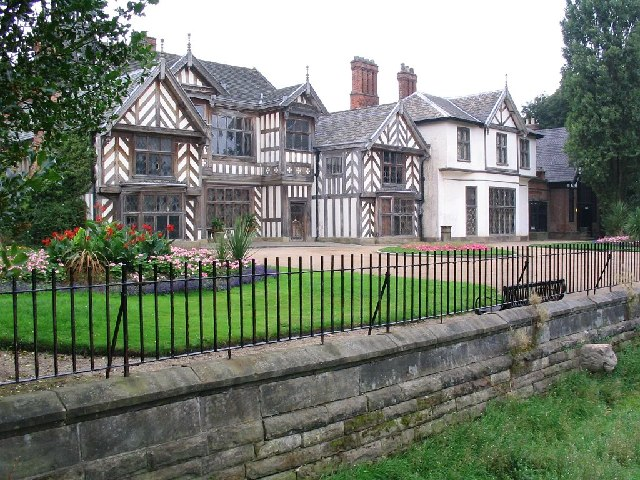
Wythenshawe Hall, a former stately home and local landmark in Wythenshawe Park

The name Wythenshawe seems to come from the Old English wiðign, meaning "withy tree", and sceaga, meaning "wood" (compare dialectal word shaw). The three ancient townships of Northenden, Baguley, and Northen Etchells formally became the present-day Wythenshawe when they were merged with Manchester in 1931. Until then, the name was only used to refer to Wythenshawe Hall and its grounds.

Due to spending cuts, the hall was temporarily closed to the public in 2010. One proposition was that Manchester City Council could sell the building to the National Trust. A friends group was formed to support monthly open days and events at the hall. In March 2016, the hall's roof, one of its upper floors and its clock tower were severely damaged by a fire in an arson attack.

Immediately south of Wythenshawe is Manchester Airport. Before the airport was laid out, three farm fields between Rackhouse Road and Wythenshawe Road in Northern Moor, in what is now the north edge of Wythenshawe, were used as Manchester (Wythenshawe) Aerodrome. This was the UK's first municipal airfield, operating between April 1929 and early 1930. A barn was converted to act as the hangar and a farmhouse as the administration building. Temporary fuel pumps were installed. The last recorded flight from Wythenshawe Airport was on 19 June 1930.

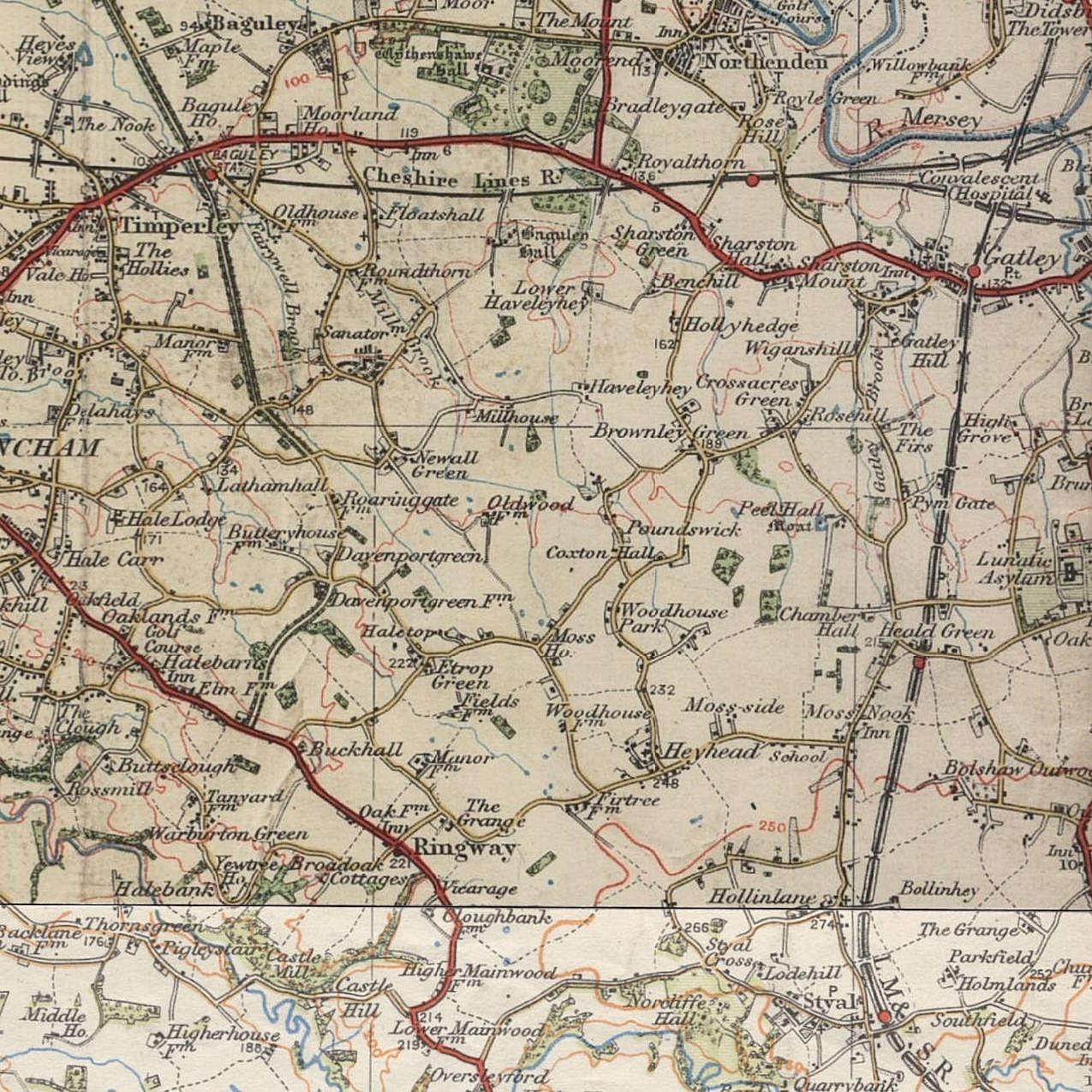
Area where Manchester Airport and Wythenshawe are now, as around 1925

Wythenshawe was in the Church of England Diocese of Chester until 1933, when it was transferred to the neighbouring Diocese of Manchester.

Wythenshawe Bus Garage was built of reinforced concrete during 1939–42, designed by Manchester's city architect, G. Noel Hill. It was taken over by the Ministry of Aircraft Production and A. V. Roe & Co. Ltd. used it for building Lancaster aircraft during the Second World War. The building was grade II* listed in 2001.

== Housing and social history ==
Wythenshawe is Manchester's largest district. The massive housing estate that was built there in the 1920s was intended as a "garden city", where people could be rehoused away from industrial Manchester. In 1920, town planner Patrick Abercrombie identified the area as the most suitable undeveloped land for a housing estate close to the city, and 2,500 acres (1,000 ha) of land was purchased.

Part of Benchill (not the area southwest of Gladeside Road) and some areas in the north were built before World War II and called the Wythenshawe Ward of the City of Manchester. The rest was built after the Second World War, starting in the late 1940s as wartime building restrictions were relaxed. Parts of Baguley were still semi-rural in the 1960s, but there is now very little open country left.

The estate was initially built without many shops, amenities or services, and there was very little employment available in the area. Although Northenden already had a shopping area on Palatine Road, the earliest new shops were built in the 1930s and included parades on Hollyhedge Road, and on Altrincham Road in Sharston (the latter was demolished in 1973 to make way for the M56 Sharston bypass). There were smaller local shops, such as a grocers, selling general household provisions, at Minsterly Parade (Woodhouse Park) and Haveley Circle (Benchill). However, it took decades for some areas of Wythenshawe to get their own neighbourhood shops, which meant residents had to travel or visit a mobile shop van when it visited their area. Various residents' associations were set up to address those problems, but progress was very slow.

Following the Second World War, Wythenshawe eventually expanded, with several further shops being built (such as Haveley Circle, built in the early 1950s but demolished in the 1990s) and businesses were attracted to the area with the expansion of the Sharston Industrial Estate and, later, the Moss Nook and Roundthorn industrial complexes. Wythenshawe gradually acquired all the amenities and facilities that the original planners had neglected to include with the building of several new schools, shops, pubs, and churches. The area also got its own hospital, and Wythenshawe Hospital grew out of the earlier Baguley Hospital in 1948. The largest shopping area was built in the 1960s in the town centre, known as the Wythenshawe Civic Centre, which has been expanded further since it was first built. In 1971, the Wythenshawe Forum was opened there, which included a library, a swimming pool, a restaurant, a bar, and a theatre.

From the 1990s to the 2000s, the houses that were built and owned by the council were transferred to the control of local housing associations, such as Willow Park in east Wythenshawe and Parkway Green in west Wythenshawe. Both associations merged in 2013 to form the Wythenshawe Community Housing Group which is now responsible for around 14,000 homes in Wythenshawe.

In 2007, The New York Times described the housing estates in Wythenshawe as representing an "extreme pocket of social deprivation and alienation".

Most of the farm buildings in the Wythenshawe area were demolished when the estate was built. Some of them, like Hollyhedge Farm and Floats Hall, were left among the houses but suffered from vandalism and had to be demolished later. Some of the present housing estates were named after former farms.

Peel Hall Farm (which had a moat) survived for over 20 years as its occupant lived on the proceeds of selling his land, but soon after he left, the property was vandalised and had to be demolished.

Newall Green Farm survived on the edge of the Newall Green housing estate area and was still occupied and run as a farm until the early 21st century when its last occupant died, when it was abandoned and fenced off. The buildings are listed. In 2006, a firm bought Newall Green Farm's buildings from Manchester Corporation. On 21 June 2014, vandals set fire to Newall Green Farm, and its roof was destroyed, but there are plans to turn the buildings into a care home for adults with learning disabilities, a working farm and a horse-riding centre.

== Parks ==
Wythenshawe has twelve parks and 18 woodland areas including Wythenshawe Park, which was designated a local nature reserve in 2011. It covers over 270 acres (110 ha) of green space and is home to Manchester's only community farm, Wythenshawe community farm. At the centre of the park is the historic Wythenshawe Hall with its Civil War and Tatton heritage. The park also has riding stables, a horticulture centre, children's play area, athletics track, football pitches, tennis courts, bowls, and golfing facilities.

In 2023, Lewis Capaldi was scheduled to perform at Wythenshawe Park as part of the park's first-ever major concert series. Noel Gallagher also announced a homecoming concert with his band Noel Gallagher's High Flying Birds. The show also featured support from Primal Scream. In 2024, Wythenshawe Park hosted another major concert over the August bank holiday weekend, featuring Manchester band New Order, joined by special guest Johnny Marr, performing on the first day. The following day, indie pop band Blossoms headlined, continuing the park's growing reputation as a prominent outdoor live music venue. In 2025, two shows were once again announced, with performances by Fontaines D.C., Kneecap and Sam Fender

Other parks include Hollyhedge Park, Peel Hall Park, Painswick Park, and Baguley Park. Northenden's Riverside Park is the first new park to be established in the city in the 21st century.

== Governance ==
The district is under the authority of Manchester City Council.

Manchester Wythenshawe parliamentary constituency was created in 1950 and represented by Alf Morris of the Labour Party between 1964 and 1997. Before the 1997 election, the boundaries were redrawn and part of the neighbouring area of Sale was included in a new constituency, Wythenshawe and Sale East. Alf Morris was replaced by Paul Goggins. It is still considered a safe Labour seat, with Labour securing over 50% of the vote (and more than twice as many votes as its nearest rival) in the 1997, 2001 and 2005 elections. Labour kept the seat in the 2010 elections, though their share of the vote decreased to 44.1%. In early 2014, following the death of Paul Goggins, a by-election was held. Labour candidate Mike Kane (a Northenden councillor until 2008) won the seat with 55.3% of the vote, although voter turnout was low (28%). The 2017 general election saw the largest vote share for Labour in the history of both the current and former Wythenshawe seat with 62.2% of the vote and a 15,000 majority, although the 2019 election saw this fall back to previous levels with a majority of 10,396 and a 53.3% share of the vote.

At the 2001 UK census, Wythenshawe was divided into six local government wards: Baguley, Benchill, Northenden, Sharston, Woodhouse Park and Brooklands (the latter being an area divided with the neighbouring borough of Trafford). Each ward was represented by three local councillors, giving Wythenshawe 21 of the 99 seats on Manchester City Council. Following a review by the Boundary Committee for England published in 2003, the ward of Benchill was abolished, and its former territory was divided between the wards of Northenden, Sharston, and Woodhouse Park.

Wythenshawe typically returns all Labour councillors in local elections, although in the 2008 elections the Liberal Democrats gained a seat in Northenden and a second seat (in the same area) in the 2010 elections. Labour regained these seats in the 2012 and 2014 elections. The Green Party have gained councillors in the Woodhouse Park ward in the 2021, 2022, and 2023 elections.

== Geography ==
Wythenshawe is 8 miles (13 km) south of Manchester city centre and is the southernmost district of the city. Altrincham and Hale lie to the south-west, Sale to the north-west, Gatley and Heald Green to the east, and Manchester Airport to the south.

Shadow Moss is an area south of Ringway Road in the southeast corner of Wythenshawe. (Note: On this old map of Wythenshawe it is roughly the rectangular area between three country lanes with Heyhead at its northwest corner.) On modern maps, its north edge is the southern branch of Ringway Road. It was partly in Northen Etchells township and partly in Styal parish. For many centuries it was a peat bog which was dug for peat fuel, locally called "turf"; local manorial law said that after digging peat the top living plant layer had to be lodged back to let more peat form afterwards. Each man's allocated part of the Moss was called his "moss room".

In the 19th century, manorial control was lost over what people used their moss rooms for, and an 1839 tithe map of Northen Etchells shows Northen Etchells's part of Shadow Moss as about 2/3 arable, about 1/3 meadow, one field as pasture, and one field as "uncultivated moors".

Later, the fertile lowland peat soil led to the area being much used for market gardening, with large areas under greenhouses. Of the people who worked there, many lived in Heyhead.

Around 1970, Heyhead was a small settlement at the south end of Woodhouse Lane and the nearby part of Ringway Road. It comprised several terrace houses, a small shop, two or more old cottages, a chapel, and the Ringway Haulage Company. Manchester Airport's ground-level car parking has been displaced from other areas and car parks have been formed to the north and south of the runways and under the approach path. The Heyhead area has been progressively replaced by level car parks, and by 2011 all of Heyhead's buildings had vanished (see History of Manchester Airport § Expansion).

Some greenhouses remain at the far east of the Shadow Moss area, but are used by private car parking operators. The last market gardener there, who grew tomatoes, closed in 2011 due to competition from highly mechanized greenhouse establishments elsewhere.

== Public services ==
Wythenshawe is policed by the city of Manchester division of Greater Manchester Police. Wythenshawe's fire and rescue services are the responsibility of the Greater Manchester Fire and Rescue Service, and are based at a fire station on Brownley Road.

== Transport ==
The M56 motorway, constructed in the 1970s as a continuation of the A5103 road (Princess Parkway), bisects east and west Wythenshawe. A bypass connecting it to the nearby M60 motorway was built through Sharston and opened in 1974.

The nearest railway station to Wythenshawe was located adjacent to Longley Lane at the edge of Sharston on the Cheshire Lines Railway from Stockport to Liverpool Central. Named Northenden for Wythenshawe, Northenden railway station was closed on 30 November 1964. Wythenshawe did not then have a public railway service for several decades, with the nearest stations being located in the neighbouring areas of Gatley and Heald Green, as well as the market town of Altrincham. A station at Manchester Airport was opened in 1993.

The Airport Line branch of the Manchester Metrolink tram service includes twelve stops throughout Wythenshawe. The line opened on 3 November 2014, a year ahead of schedule. In addition to the building of the new Metrolink lines and stations, a new public transport hub was built in Wythenshawe Town Centre which opened in June 2015 and includes a new bus station and tram stop.

== Economy ==
The Civic Centre in Wythenshawe. The Park Court multi-storey flats at the far end were demolished in 2007, replaced by new retail and office buildings.

Approximately 43,000 people work in Wythenshawe. There are four areas of industrial activity (estates) — Moss Nook, Ringway (Airport Cargo Centre), Roundthorn and Sharston. It is home to Manchester Airport and Wythenshawe Hospital (part of Manchester University NHS Foundation Trust), which are two of the largest employers in the area. Many national and international companies have premises or main offices in Wythenshawe, including Timpson Ltd, HellermannTyton, Virgin Media, Vodafone and F. Duerr & Sons.

In 1934, George Hamer Scholes built the Wylex Works to produce electrical accessories. The company was later acquired by Electrium, which is now under Siemens' ownership.

Several greenfield and greyfield sites have been opened up to developers and there are several new housing developments within the area.

The town centre, known as the Civic Centre, was originally built in the 1960s. It expanded over the years and was renovated between 1999 and 2002 to include new stores and other new features, when the city council relinquished ownership and transferred it to St. Modwen Properties. The main shopping area now includes gates that are locked at night to prevent the vandalism that was seen in previous years. The Forum centre, which opened in 1971, houses a library, leisure centre, swimming pool, cafe and other amenities, has also been renovated in a more modern style. For thirty years it also housed the Forum Theatre, but this closed in 2002 and a health clinic and an adult education facility now occupy its space.

The Golden Garter was a prominent nightclub and cabaret venue located in Wythenshawe. It opened on 7 October 1968 with Bruce Forsyth headlining the opening night performance.The venue had been converted from a bowling alley by the Belle Vue Company of Manchester and quickly gained a reputation as one of Britain's premier showbar theatre restaurants, offering a blend of dining, dancing, and live entertainment. Throughout its 14-year history, the Golden Garter hosted an array of renowned performers. Notable acts included comedian Tommy Cooper, singer Eartha Kitt, pop icon Dusty Springfield, rock band The Hollies, soul group The Temptations, and the legendary Bee Gees. These performances contributed to the club's status as a key venue in the UK's entertainment circuit. In 1973, the venue was rebranded as The New Golden Garter, reflecting its evolving identity. However, by the early 1980s, the club faced declining attendance, leading to reduced operating days. The Golden Garter ultimately closed its doors on 31 December 1982, with The Fortunes being the final act to perform.

Wythenshawe has seen the closure of several long-standing pubs, including The Benchill (Hollyhedge Road), Greenwood Tree (Greenwood Road), Happy Man, Mountain Ash (Portway), Woodpecker (Selstead Road), Talisman (Oatlands Road), Royal Oak, Royal Thorn, The Sharston (Altrincham Road), and Lantern Inn (Hall Lane). Wythenshawe retains a number of traditional pubs that continue to serve as social hubs in the community. Among those still operating are the Black Boy (Bowland Road), Red Beret, The Cornishman (Cornishway), The Firbank (Firbank Road), Gardeners Arms (Wythenshawe Road), The Jolly Butcher (Petersfield Drive), Newall Green Pub, Red Rose (Greenbrow Road), and Silver Birch (Poundswick Lane).

In 2007, Asda opened a new superstore on the site of the old Co-operative store (originally built by Woolco in the mid-1970s, which also features a multi-storey car park). A walkway going between the multi-storey car park and the large supermarket building now features a wall mosaic depicting various aspects of the town. After the demolition of two 1960s blocks of multi-storey flats in 2007, new buildings were constructed on the site including a new Wilko shop, office premises and a local authority services hub that provides a new frontage for the town centre from its north-facing aspect.

In June 2022, Manchester City Council announced the purchase of Wythenshawe town centre from St. Modwen Properties as part of wider plans to transform the town centre.

== In the media ==
Wythenshawe FM is a community radio station, that has been serving its community since it first began broadcasting on 25 May 2000. Starting as a short-term project from a Radio Regen training course, it quickly grew through extended broadcasts in 2001 and a year-long run in 2002. Since then, it has continued to operate for over two decades, evolving into a fully volunteer-run station operating from the Wythenshawe Forum.

Wythenshawe World is a family-run, fortnightly newspaper serving the M22 and M23 postal districts. Established in 1980 by John Oatway, it distributed 29,000 copies per issue, providing community news, local events, and features relevant to residents. The newspaper ceased publication in 2015. In 2016, the publication was revived by M&Q Media, an independent publisher, aiming to continue its legacy of serving the local community .

Wythenshawe was the outdoor filming location for the Channel 4 series Shameless, which shows various shots of the local tower-blocks, housing estates and other architecture unique to this area. Wythenshawe also housed the outdoor sets for the show, which were built on private property. Production moved from West Gorton (in East Manchester) in early 2007, following disruption to filming caused by local youths.

In 2009, Sarah, Duchess of York (former wife of Prince Andrew) went to Wythenshawe to make a television documentary for ITV1 entitled The Duchess on the Estate. In it, she visited the Northern Moor area of Wythenshawe to meet locals and discuss their way of life, and to open a new local community centre. Both before and after its transmission, the documentary was criticised for being a self-serving publicity stunt by Ferguson and she was also criticised for her patronising attitude towards the local people.

On 21 September 2023, Noel Gallagher's High Flying Birds released the concert film Live at Wythenshawe Park, Manchester.

== Sport ==
Wythenshawe has two football clubs, Wythenshawe Town F.C. and Wythenshawe F.C., who both were promoted from Level 9 of the football pyramid in 2023-24, and currently play in the Northern Premier League Division One West.

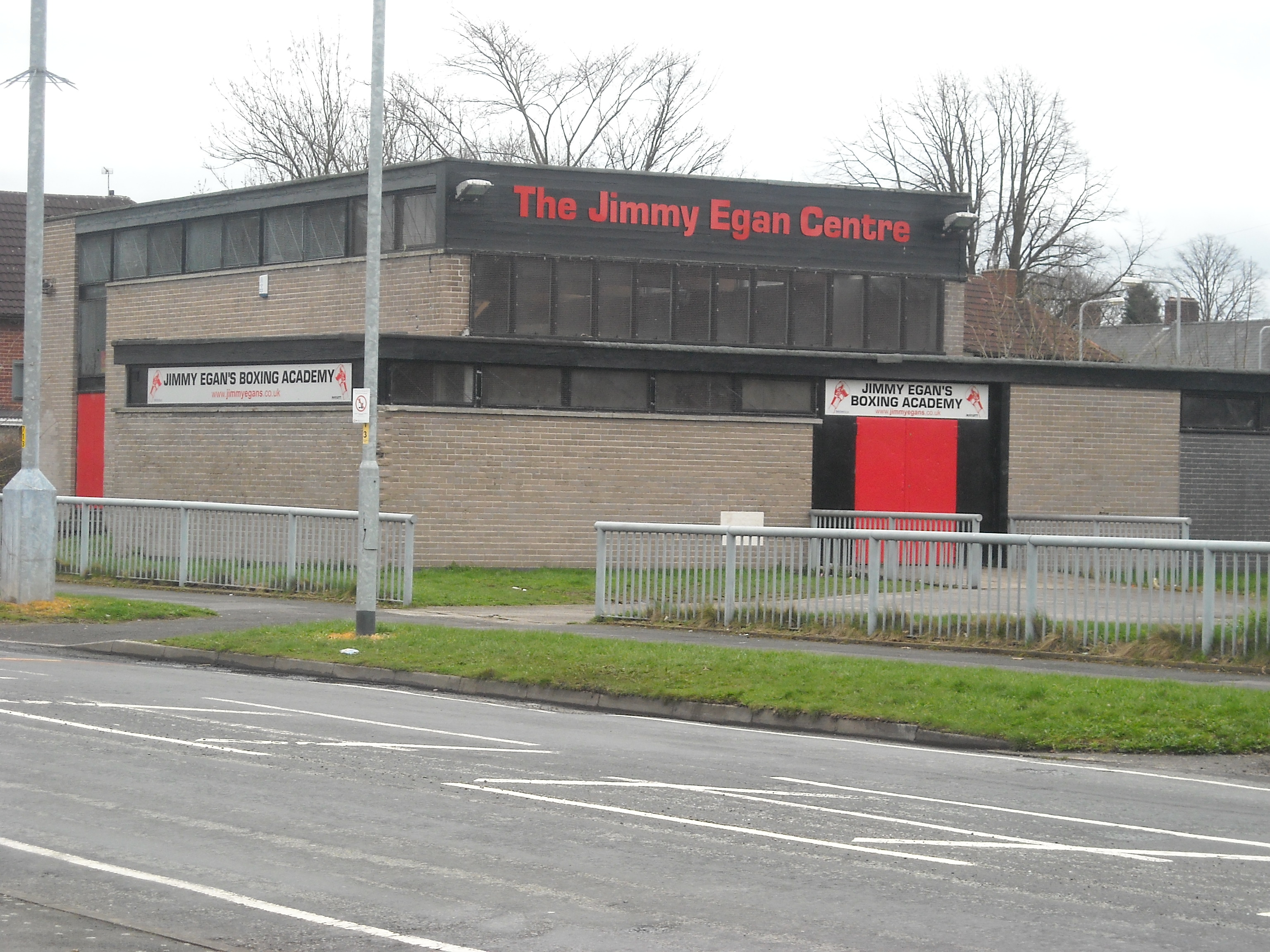
Jimmy Egan Boxing Academy, Royalthorn Rd.

Jimmy Egan's Boxing Academy is a community-focused boxing club. It was established on 14 January 1980 by Jimmy Egan and has been a cornerstone of local youth development and amateur boxing. Following Jimmy Egan's passing in 2004, his sons Steve and Shaun Egan continued his legacy, leading the club to produce multiple national champions, including notable boxers such as Tyson Fury, Jimmy "Kilrain" Kelly, Kofi Yates, Hosea Burton, and Macaulay McGowan.

South Manchester Gymnastics Centre is a gymnastics facility. Established in 1989 on the former site of Sharston High School, the centre has produced numerous British champions and Olympians, and is considered one of the region's top training venues. Notable alumni include Kathy Williams, who represented Great Britain as first black Olympian gymnast.

== Education ==
=== Primary schools ===
- Baguley Hall Primary School
- Benchill Primary School
- Button Lane Primary School
- Crossacres Primary Academy
- Haveley Hey Community School
- Newall Green Primary School
- Northenden County Primary School
- Peel Hall Primary School
- Ringway Primary School
- Sacred Heart RC Primary School
- St Aidan's RC Primary School
- St Anthony's RC Primary School
- St Elizabeth's RC Primary School
- St Peter's RC Primary School
- SS John Fisher and Thomas More Catholic Primary School
- St Wilfrid's Primary School
- Sandilands Primary School
- The Willows Primary School

=== Secondary schools ===
- Dixons Brooklands Academy, located in Baguley. Established in 1967 as Brookway High School.
- Manchester Enterprise Academy, located on Simonsway. Established in 1999 as Parklands High School.
- St Paul's Catholic High School, located in Newall Green, is the area's sole Catholic secondary school. Established in 1984.

=== Special educational needs schools ===
- Ashgate Specialist Support Primary School
- Pioneer House High School
- Piper Hill High School
- Southern Cross School

=== Further education ===
- The Manchester College (Wythenshawe)

=== Former schools ===
- Newall Green High School
- Poundswick Grammar School
- St Augustine's Grammar School

== Notable people ==
=== Music and entertainment ===
- Johnny Marr – guitarist and co-songwriter of The Smiths.
- Andy Rourke – bassist of The Smiths.
- Rob Gretton – manager of Joy Division and co-owner of The Haçienda.
- Alan Erasmus – actor and co-founder of Factory Records and The Haçienda.
- Jason Orange – singer from Take That
- Paul Young – lead singer of Mike and the Mechanics and Sad Café.
- Slaughter & the Dogs – punk band, famously supported the Sex Pistols at the Lesser Free Trade Hall on 20 July 1976.
- Freddie Garrity – frontman of 1960s pop group Freddie and the Dreamers.
- Russ North – Heavy metal vocalist, best known as the lead singer of the band Cloven Hoof.
- The Nosebleeds – punk band. Allegedly featured a young Morrissey before his time with The Smiths.
- Lyn Paul – singer and actress, member of The New Seekers
- Vini Reilly – musician and leader of the post-punk group The Durutti Column
- Toby Toman – drummer who played with various British bands including The Durutti Column and Primal Scream

=== Sport ===
- Marcus Rashford – Manchester United and England footballer.
- Tyson Fury – heavyweight boxing world champion.
- Cole Palmer – Chelsea F.C. and England footballer.
- Ravel Morrison – former Manchester United and current Jamaica footballer.
- Shay Brennan – Manchester United footballer who debuted after the 1958 Munich air disaster.
- Paul Stewart – professional footballer, played for Manchester City, Tottenham Hotspur, Liverpool, and England.
- Shay Logan – professional footballer, best known for his time at Aberdeen F.C.
- Lukas Nmecha and Felix Nmecha – brothers and professional footballers.
- Anthony Taylor – Premier League and international football referee.
- Alf Wood – footballer for Manchester City and others, lived in Newall Green and attended Oldwood Junior School.
- Jimmy Kelly – professional boxer, former WBO light-middleweight titleholder.
- Joe Gallagher – boxing trainer to world champions Anthony Crolla and the Smith brothers.
- Jimmy Egan – amateur boxing trainer, known for training Ricky Hatton and David Barnes.
- Lewis McGrillen – professional MMA fighter, known as "The McGrizzla". Won the PFL Europe Bantamweight Championship in 2024.
- Andy Morris – professional boxer. Former British featherweight champion (2005–2006) and Commonwealth Games bronze medallist (2002).
- Colin Little – former professional footballer. He later became a coach at Manchester United's U18s Academy.
- Niamh Kinehan – professional MMA fighter, former Muay Thai fighter. She is a former multiple time world champion and won the WBC Muay Thai Female Fighter of the Year in 2022.

=== Acting and television ===
- Caroline Aherne – comedienne and actress best known for The Royle Family
- John Bradley – actor, known for portraying Samwell Tarly in Game of Thrones.
- Lorraine Cheshire – actress, best known for her role in Early Doors.
- Harry H. Corbett – actor, known for his role in Steptoe and Son.
- Syd Little – comedian, part of the Little and Large double act.
- Emily Beecham – award-winning actress. She starred in Into the Badlands and Little Joe.
- David Schofield – actor. Known for his roles in Pirates of the Caribbean, Gladiator, and various British television dramas.
- Andrew Ellis – actor best known for his role as Gadget in This Is England (2006), and its television sequels.
- Don Knight – actor. He worked largely in the United States, and often played tough guys.
- Coronation Street actors Simon Gregson, Nicholas Cochrane, Chris Bisson and Kevin Kennedy

=== Other ===
- Michael Wood – historian and broadcaster.
- Duncan Hallas – Trotskyist leader.
- Kirsty Howard – children's hospice campaigner and fundraiser for Francis House Children's Hospice.
- Steve McGarry – cartoonist and president of the National Cartoonists Society.
- The Donnelly Brothers – founders of the fashion label Gio-Goi. They have alleged connections to the Quality Street Gang and were influential in Manchester's acid house scene.
- Nazir Afzal - British Pakistani solicitor and senior academic.

== See also ==
- Listed buildings in Manchester-M22
- Listed buildings in Manchester-M23
- List of council estates in the United Kingdom
