= Harvey Broadbent =

British writer

Harvey Broadbent AM
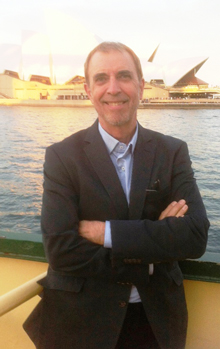
- Born: 1946 (age 79–80); Manchester, United Kingdom
- Occupations: Author, broadcaster
- Years active: 1977–present
- Website: harveybroadbent.com

Harvey Broadbent, AM (born 1946) is an Australian writer, lecturer, broadcaster, former award-winning full-time television and radio documentary maker, associate professor and cruise ship cultural history lecturer. He was appointed a Member of the Order of Australia on 26 January 2016 for significant service to the literary arts as an author and publisher, to the television industry as a producer, and to tertiary education. He is nowadays best known in Australia as a Gallipoli Campaign historian and specialist in Turkish, Anatolian, and Eastern Mediterranean history and culture.

== Publications ==
Broadbent is the author of four books on the Gallipoli Campaign, including Gallipoli the Turkish Defence (Miegunyah Press/Melbourne University Publishing, 2015), Defending Gallipoli (Melbourne University Publishing, 2015). These books mark the centenary of the Gallipoli Campaign in 2015 and are based on several years of research in Turkish archives.

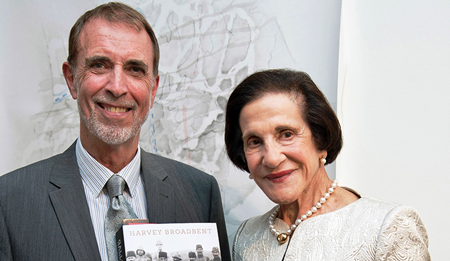
Broadbent with Dame Marie Bashir, former governor of New South Wales, as she launched his book Gallipoli, the Turkish Defence in February 2015

Broadbent's earlier books include Gallipoli, The Fatal Shore, which marked the 90th anniversary of the Gallipoli campaign, and The Boys Who Came Home, Recollections of Gallipoli. He was also consultant and writer for Voices of the First World War (Reader's Digest Australia, 2014). From 2006 to 2015 he was an associate professor and senior research fellow in the Department of Modern History at Macquarie University in Sydney, where he was director of the Gallipoli Centenary Turkish Archives Research Project.

== Biographical ==
Harvey Broadbent was born 1946 in Manchester, United Kingdom, where he lived throughout his schooldays. His father, Arthur (born in Manchester in 1917) worked for the GPO in the personnel section and his mother, Alice (born in Manchester in 1917 as Alice Burn) worked at various times as a seamstress and shop assistant. During the Second World War Arthur was a signalman in the Royal Corps of Signals and after being taken prisoner of war in Greece in 1941, spent four years as a prison of war at Stalag 18A in Austria. Arthur had a self-taught talent for music as a jazz drummer, which he developed during his prisoner years, and the jazz piano. He was the drummer of a swing band set up in Stalag 18A.

Arthur and Alice passed on their joint love of and aptitude for music to young Harvey and his younger sister, Carole Lesley (born in 1950). Harvey recalls the fun he had at the age of ten when he and his neighbourhood friends formed a 'skiffle group', with Harvey on a battered old guitar and performed impromptu concerts regularly in a friend's front garden for the local children.

Broadbent attended Poundswick Grammar School in south Manchester from 1958 to 1964, where he developed his interest in music, drama, literature and history. He developed his guitar playing and basic piano playing and learned the trombone. Apart from playing in the school orchestra, at the age of fourteen he formed a beat group with a couple of school friends and two other boys from the district. This became his major hobby for the next four years and the group began performing at venues in the district as they became more professional. At 18 Harvey left the group to continue his education with tertiary studies.

In 1967, he graduated in education, majoring in literature, drama and music, from the University of Birmingham Institute of Education's Dudley College, in 1967. He married Cindy (aka Cynthia) Davies, who he had met at college and they decided to work as teachers overseas. In the same year a position as an English teacher eventuated in Turkey, which saw the young couple travelling to take up residence in the Black Sea town of Zonguldak, Turkey's coal mining centre. Here they worked at the Turkish Education Society's (TED) Zonguldak Koleji until 1969, when Harvey's father Arthur died suddenly of a heart attack back in Manchester at the age of 52. This brought Harvey and Cindy back to England and Manchester, where they took up school teaching positions. Their first child, daughter Emma Jane was born in 1971, the year Harvey left teaching to study Turkish and Persian Studies in the University of Manchester's Department of Near Eastern Studies.

Broadbent graduated with honours in Near Eastern studies at Manchester in 1974. This coincided with the birth of twin boys, Adrian Paul and Mark Andrew. Then in January 1975 the family migrated to Australia, where Harvey taught English and drama for a year at Camden High School in New South Wales. In 1976 he took up a position as a scriptwriter with Migrant Education Television in Wollongong, before joining the Australian Broadcasting Corporation (ABC) as a producer/director in 1977.

== Broadcasting ==
From 1977 to 1999, Broadbent worked as a producer and executive producer with the ABC and won awards for his radio and television productions, working at various times on Playschool, Behind the News, Four Corners, Quantum, Holiday, Special Projects, Arts, Documentaries He was producer for the following major television programs and series:

History Series: Timeframe, (1998)
HMAS Voyager: The Cruel Fate (1992)
TV special projects including AFI Awards (1996–1998)
Victory in the Pacific Live Outside Broadcast (1995)
Gallipoli 75th anniversary programs (1990)
Encounter With Neptune (1989)
Gallipoli, The Fatal Shore (1988), winner of the United Nations Association of Australia Media Peace Award)
The Boys Who Came Home (which he also published in book form)
75th Anniversary Gallipoli Pilgrimage (1990), and Live From Gallipoli (1990) for which he received the Television Society Award for the best Special Event in Television, 1990.

=== Other credits ===
2004-2005: associate producer for the documentary film Revealing Gallipoli. December Films in co-production with ABC TV, TRT, RTE, TZNZ and TV S4C (Wales) shown on Turkish Radio and Television Corporation on 18 March, and ABC TV on 24 April 2005.

His 30 years of radio production at the ABC has included: many educational series and programs including: Education Now, Books and Writing, Background Briefing. 1977–79: radio-vision series, Australian Art 1979: a three part radio series for ABC Radio, From Nomads to Migrants, Turks in Australia. 1981: the radio series Johnny Turk After Gallipoli to commemorate centenary of the birth of Kemal Atatürk. Other radio features include: Gallipoli Voices, (poems composed at and about Gallipoli), a production of Australian poet, Michael Connolly's Kembla Voices, about the 1902 Mr Kembla mine explosion, and the serialised Fruits of our Labour by Karen Burton, which documented the life of itinerant fruit pickers in Queensland. Since 1999 as an independent producer and writer he created sound features and documentaries for ABC Classic FM and Radio National such as Gallipoli Voices, Listening to Istanbul, World Street, Dervish, Encountering Damascus, Listening to Manchester, The Poetry of Sufism, A Bridge in Your Ear (celebration of the Sydney Harbour Bridge), Travellers not Tourists (about cultural tourism), Gallipoli Pilgrimage, Minstrels of War (2007) and The Mystical Muse (2008)

== Awards ==
In 2016, awarded the Australian national honour of Member of the Order of Australia. The United Nations Association of Australia Media Peace Award 1988 for Gallipoli, The Fatal Shore Television Society Award Highest Selling Australian-made Videocassette for 1988–89 – Gallipoli, The Fatal Shore Television Society Award for the best Special Event Television 1990 The Boys Who Came Home (which he also published in book form) and the 75th Anniversary Gallipoli Pilgrimage (1990), and Live From Gallipoli (1990)

== Other works ==
From 2003 he wrote the International Correspondent column for Friends, the magazine of the National Museum of Australia. His writing has involved many articles for various journals. Harvey is an experienced lecturer both in the lecture theatre and on cruise ships. He lectures regularly about Turkey, its history and that of the Eastern Mediterranean region. He has lectured at Macquarie University, Sydney University Continuing Education, the Workers Education Association Sydney (WEA), the Royal United Services Association, Sydney, National Seniors, and various community and service organisations such as Rotary. Since 2005 he has been lecturing annually on various cruise ships. As a study tour group leader he has led tours to Turkey, Syria, Jordan, Greece, and UK every year between 1992 and 2006, mainly for Australians Studying Abroad. He has travelled extensively in Turkey and the Eastern Mediterranean over many years, leading tours and making documentary films. From 2006 to 2016 when he retired, he was an Associate Professor at Macquarie University directing the Gallipoli Centenary Turkish Archives Research Project. The results of the research were published in two books in 2015. Since his retirement in 2016 he has been active in pursuing his hobby as a musician, notably for the Sydney U3A (University of the 3rd Age) as musical director leading the 3rd Age Rock Orchestra on Sydneys Northern Beaches.

== List of journal articles ==
- How an Ethnic Minority was Bulgarised, Article, Sydney Morning Herald, 1986
- The Ultimate Lesson of Gallipoli, Article, The Good Weekend, SMH, 1986
- From Foes to Friends, Australian-Turkish Relations and Gallipoli, Lecture, University of Sydney 10 March 2006 and the Turkish Embassy, Canberra on 8 December 2006.
- Completing the Gallipoli Story. Article. Journal of the Society for Army History, No. 43, Autumn 2007, Brunel University, UK., p. 208–223
- Gallipoli from the Turkish Perspective, Australian War Memorial Journal, Wartime, 2007
- Researching Gallipoli, Address given at the Royal United Services Institute of New South Wales, on 26 February 2008
- Completing the story of the Dardanelles and Gallipoli Campaign: The Gallipoli Centenary Turkish Archives Research Project, Lecture at the British High Commission, Canberra, 25 April 2008
- A Simple Epic, Gallipoli and the Australian Media, the Lone Pine Memorial Lecture, Gallipoli Club, Sydney, 6 August 2009 and delivered to the Royal United Services Institute (RUSI), 28 October 2009, also subsequently published in 'United Service', The Journal of the Royal United Services Institute of New South Wales, No. 61, March 2010, Sydney.
- Gallipoli's First Day: a day of riddles, Extract from Australian Broadcasting Corporation website Gallipoli, The First Day, www.abc.net.au/gallipoli
- Gallipoli's First Day: Turkish documents separating myth and reality, Article for AWM journal Wartime, Issue 46, April 2009
- Gallipoli's Place Names, Article for Placenames Australia, March 2010
- The Ottoman Army response in the Gallipoli Campaign: From English translations of documents in Turkish Military Archives and other sources by the Gallipoli Centenary Research Project. Paper delivered at the 3rd International Gallipoli Symposium, Istanbul Mediniyet University (in assoc. with the Australian National University) 20/21 April 2012
- Australia's Love Affair with Gallipoli, paper delivered by Harvey Broadbent at public lecture at the Middle East Technical University, Ankara, May 2011, and the Netherlands Institute of Higher Education, Ankara, June 2011
- Researching Gallipoli in the Turkish Archives. Paper given by Harvey Broadbent at the First International Gallipoli Symposium at the Australian National University. (2007)
- Book Review of Australia's Muslim Cameleers: Pioneers of the Inland 1860s to 1930s, Museums Australia May 2008 *18
- Book Review of Gallipoli: Attack from the Sea by Victor Ruddeno, New Haven, 2008
- Book Review of The Landing at Anzac 1915, Chris Roberts, The Australian Review, 27 April 2013
- "No room for any lapses in concentration" (General Esat Pasha, 11 August 1915): Ottoman Commanders' responses to the August Offensive in the Anzac sector. Paper delivered by Harvey Broadbent at Australian War Memorial International Gallipoli Conference, "A Ridge Too Far", August 2010 and published in the conference papers, 'Gallipoli, A Ridge Too Far,' Australian War Memorial, 2013
