= Poundswick Grammar School =

Location
- Civic Centre Road (Simonsway); Wythenshawe, Greater Manchester, M22 9RH; England; 53°22′54″N 2°16′09″W

Information
- Type: Grammar school
- Motto: "Nisi Dominus Frustra"
- Established: 1956
- Closed: 1967
- Local authority: Manchester
- Ofsted: Reports
- Gender: Mixed
- Age: 11 to 18
- Enrolment: 500
- Fate: Became Poundswick High School (now Manchester Enterprise Academy)
- Website: http://www.poundswick.org.uk/

Poundswick Grammar School or PGS was a mainstream secondary school in the Poundswick Corridor of "Wythenshawe" and at its peak had over 500 pupils.

== History ==
Whilst being built from 1954, with two other nearby schools, the Labour-dominated Manchester Education Committee had cold feet about the grammar school, technical school and secondary modern plan in the area, and nominally wanted them to be three comprehensive schools – few comprehensive schools existed in the UK at that time. The other two new secondary were West Wythenshawe Comprehensive School and Yew Tree Secondary Modern School (based on an existing building). Parents of 119 out of 120 children who had been selected for the grammar school complained to the council about the proposed scheme to have comprehensive schools instead. The council had a plan for 'grammar school type' courses to be taught instead at the comprehensives, but the parents said it was 'wishful thinking' that a grammar school education was possible at the comprehensives. The council claimed that because Wythenshawe had elected Labour councillors at recent elections meant that local people did not want a grammar school system.

The Ministry of Education wrote to the council in July 1955 to say it was unwise to go ahead with the comprehensive plan until it had been approved, but the council took little notice. In September 1955, four days before the school was due to open, the Minister of Education, Sir David Eccles, intervened to stop the comprehensive plan. Instead he approved the original plan of the Poundswick Grammar School for 750 children, and a secondary modern school at Oldwood (which the council wanted to combine into a comprehensive on two sites), and two single sex technical schools at West Wythenshawe (which the council wanted to combine into a single comprehensive). The Minister said he would approve comprehensive plans 'as an experiment where favourable conditions exist'. As would be found later, favourable conditions did not exist in Wythenshawe. The Minister thought the council's plans were too rudimentary, uneconomic, not thought-through (especially two sites for a school being half a mile apart) and a little rushed and ill-conceived. The council was resolute in opening the school as a two-site comprehensive in September 1955, claiming it was just too late for the plans to be reversed. Eveline Hill was the local Conservative MP.

On 17 October 1955, the council acknowledged it could not carry on with the comprehensive proposal. The West Wythenshawe Secondary Technical School for Girls and the West Wythenshawe Secondary Technical School for Boys were approved at the same time.

It was opened in August 1956 by Manchester Education Committee, being Manchester's first co-educational grammar school, at a cost of £249,000. It was officially opened on 26 June 1957. The grammar school even had its own orchestra, which played at the 1957 opening ceremony. A sculpture, by Austin Wright, was commissioned for the school which cost £2,500. Mitzi Cunliffe, of Didsbury, made a sculpture for the West Wythenshawe technical schools. The school was situated close to what would become junction 4 of the M56, between Newall Green and Wythenshawe Centre.

=== Poundswick High School ===
By the mid-1960s, comprehensive schools were becoming more mainstream, and Manchester, previously thwarted by a Conservative government, was going to make up for lost time when Labour were elected in 1964 to turn all its schools comprehensive. In December 1964 the council unveiled its plans for comprehensive education, to be introduced by 1967. The direct-grant grammar schools would remain until 1976. Manchester's 65 schools would become 48 due to natural closures, then would become 28 when schools were combined as comprehensives.

In 1967 it was renamed as Poundswick High School when, as per the initial plan, it merged with Oldwood Secondary Modern School (on Portway); Manchester finally got what it wanted. The new headmaster Mr Albert Gilpin MBE, the former grammar school's (only) head, and the head of the lower school was Mr Ashton, former head of Brownley Green Secondary Modern School. The Brownley Green school had combined with Moss Nook Secondary Modern School to form the (nearby) South Wythenshawe School. The two Wythenshawe single-sex technical schools combined to form a comprehensive. The new Poundswick school, on Portway, had 1,300 boys and girls. The comprehensive change was incremental, and the last grammar school intake left as sixth formers in 1973.

In September 1982, most Manchester secondary schools, including Poundswick, lost their sixth forms, with there being three 11–18 schools and three sixth form colleges instead for A-level candidates. Half of the Poundswick teaching staff left.

=== Social problems ===
In late 1985, there was a dispute over five boys, who were expelled in June 1985 for obscene graffiti describing ten teachers (and their wives). When they were reinstated, by the local council, this prompted 47 out of 61 teachers to refuse to teach them, which involved virtually closing the school for approximately seven months. It also led to other schools in Manchester closing when other teachers also went on strike, in sympathy.

In 1995 the lower school, on Portway, closed and was demolished. The site became a small, discrete housing development within the greater Woodhouse Park estate.

Over a three-year period until 1998, the Poundswick High School suspended 782 pupils. Wythenshawe is a part of Manchester with social problems, and this may have been reflected in the school's troubled life as a comprehensive.

=== Parklands High School and Manchester Enterprise Academy ===
In 1999 Poundswick High School and South Manchester High School closed down and a new school, Parklands High School was opened on the Poundswick site. Students from both the closing schools transferred to the new school. Much was done to try and establish the facility as a new school and not just a continuation of Poundswick under another name. This even included the re-cladding of the entire building, in a new colour scheme.

In 2009 Parklands was renamed the Manchester Enterprise Academy, which is backed by local companies including Manchester Airports Group, The Manchester College, Manchester United Foundation and Wythenshawe Community Housing Group to improve secondary education in Manchester.

Construction of a new Academy building on part of the original Poundswick site started in early 2009 and was completed in time for the start of the Autumn term 2010. All the original Poundswick Grammar School buildings were demolished in the last few months of 2010.

== Notable former pupils ==
=== Poundswick High School ===
- Ewan McCray, former Derbyshire cricketer
