= Co-op Academy Manchester =

Location
- Plant Hill Road; Blackley, Manchester, M9 0WQ; England; 53°31′45″N 2°13′19″W

Information
- Type: Co-operative academy
- Established: 2010
- Local authority: Manchester
- Specialist: Finance & Business
- Department for Education URN: 136174 Tables
- Ofsted: Reports
- Headteacher: William Butcher
- Gender: Coeducational
- Age: 11 to 16
- Predecessor school: Plant Hill Arts College
- Website: manchester.coopacademies.co.uk

Co-op Academy Manchester, formerly known as The Co-operative Academy of Manchester is a non-selective, mixed secondary school in Blackley, Manchester. It opened in September 2010 and replaced Plant Hill Arts College.

The academy is part of The Co-operative Academies Trust - a group of schools sponsored by The Co-operative Group.

The school has a business-focused ethos, backed up by the support of its lead sponsor and features of the new building which used to have open-plan flexible learning zones and the boardroom. The academy's first Principal, Kathy Leaver, was appointed to transform the former Plant Hill school following her dramatic success as head of Sale High School.

In July 2011 students from the Academy took part in the chorus of Victoria Wood's "That Day We Sang", part of the Manchester International Festival.

In 2013 the Manchester Evening News recognised the effort of the retiring Principal Kathy Leaver, her team and parents in transforming the academy, whose results were the most improved in the city. The paper also recognised the academy's achievement in 2014 of the highest attendance rate of the city's state schools.

Stephen Brice took up the position of Principal in April 2014.

In late 2015, the academy opened The Hive - a business and enterprise centre. The Hive, which was formerly an unused Adult Education Centre contains a number of office pods available for small businesses or start-ups to rent. In addition, The Hive is also used by Yes Manchester who help local residents into work or training.

In 2018, a new £18 million extension opened, which increased the capacity of the academy and created new facilities.

In 2020, Principal Stephen Brice was appointed as Executive Headteacher for Greater Manchester, working across a number of schools in the Trust. Christopher Beard took up the role of Headteacher. Before taking on his new role, Brice created a Minecraft version of the academy to help people familiarise themselves with the building during the COVID-19 pandemic in the United Kingdom.

== Facilities ==
The academy's facilities includes areas for each learning zone, specialist sports, art, IT, technology, music and science facilities. The 2018 extension includes a 229-seat theatre, a climbing wall and several new teaching areas.

The school hosts the 105th Manchester St Peters Scout Group, One Education Music Service and the Blackley Volunteer Police Cadets.

== June 2026 stabbing incident ==
On the 9th June 2026, police arrested and detained a student under the Mental Health Act after she stabbed two 14 year-old students and a 27 year-old member of staff. The event lasted around 5 muinets as teachers reacted quickly containing the threat. The injuries were not serious but the three injured were taken to hospitals as a precaution. The school was placed on lock-down with the site being closed down for the rest of the day. The girl was subsequently charged with three counts of attempted murder and two counts of possessing a bladed article on school premises. The night after threatening snapchat messages and videos were posted saying that they were going to stab more people the next day (making parents fearful to send children back into school), however these claims never came true. Rumers that people found her tiktok also apeard where in her reposts it showed she idolised fictional murderes like jane the ripper.( https://www.tiktok.com/@timoshka.cool?_r=1&_t=ZN-9ApZ4Lh1ydi )

== See also ==
- List of schools in Manchester
