= F. Duerr & Sons =

F. Duerr & Sons Ltd.
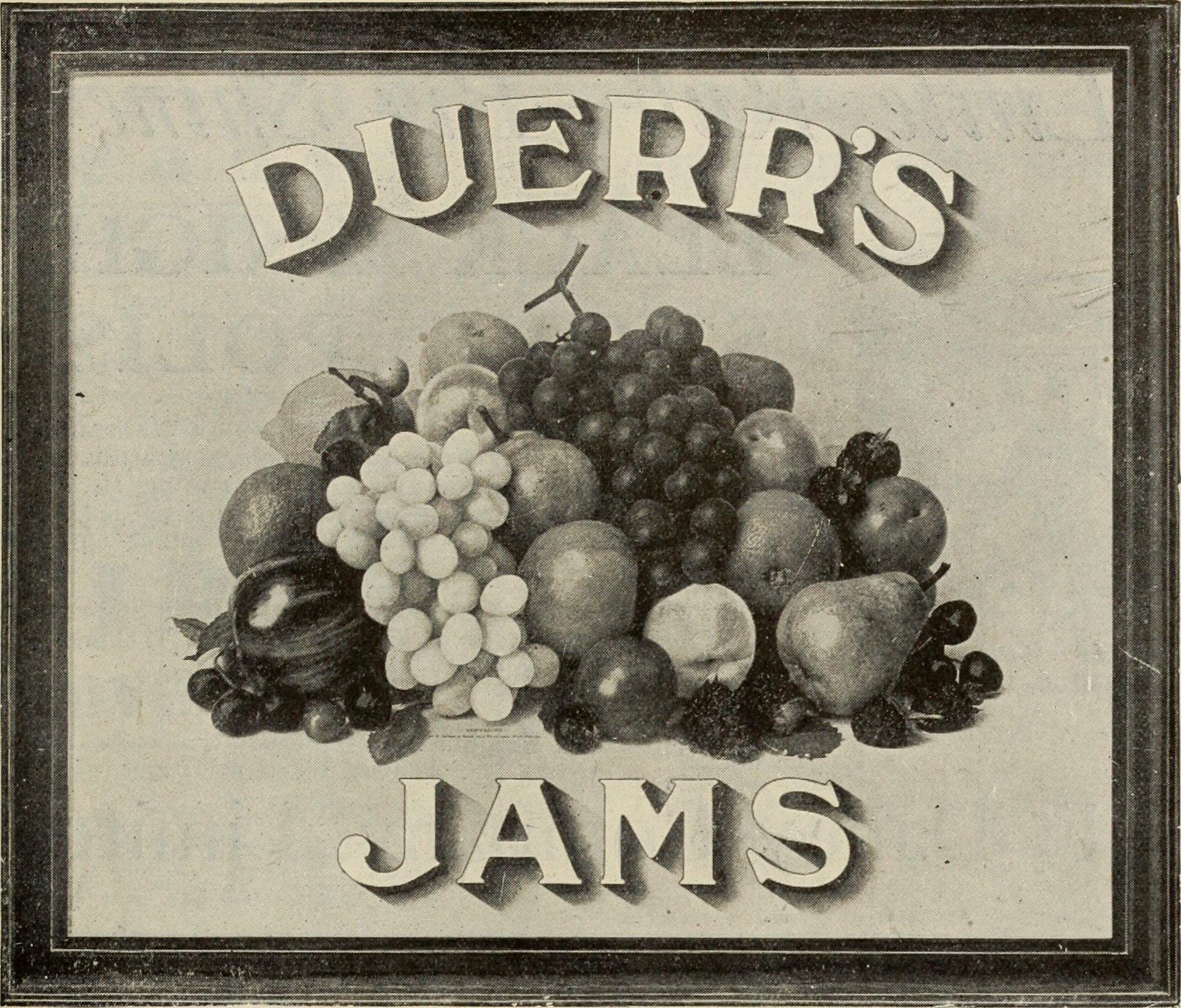
- Industry: Food
- Founded: 1881
- Founder: Frederick Duerr
- Headquarters: Wythenshawe, Manchester
- Products: Jam, marmalade and peanut butter
- Website: Duerrs.co

F. Duerr & Sons Ltd. is an independent British manufacturer of jam, marmalade, peanut butter and preserves, based in Wythenshawe, Manchester, England.

Founded in 1881 by Frederick Duerr, and originally based at his home in Heywood, Lancashire, the company moved to premises at Guide Bridge, Audenshaw in 1884. Following further expansion, the company relocated to a new purpose-built factory in Prestage Street, Old Trafford, in 1893.

During World War I, in addition to manufacturing jam and other preserves for the war effort, the company designed and manufactured the "Lifeguard" collapsible periscope for use by British troops in the trenches.

In 1924, it became a limited company.

The company opened a new warehouse and manufacturing complex in Floats Road, Wythenshawe in 1995.

Currently in its fifth generation of family management, Duerr's remains a family-run business, supplying products under the Duerr's label, and under own brand labels for food retailers in the UK.

The company created the world's most expensive marmalade in 2006 costing £5,000 and containing £3,450 worth of 62-year-old Dalmore whisky, £348 worth of vintage Pol Roger champagne, and £120 of edible gold

It was the first company to introduce easy open lids, using Orbit technology, in 2011.
