= Nothing Sacred – A Song for Kirsty =

Single by Russell Watson
- Released: 9 December 2002
- Genre: Pop; Classical
- Label: Decca
- Songwriter(s): Jim Steinman, Don Black

"Nothing Sacred – A Song for Kirsty" is a song performed by Russell Watson. It was released as a charity single in December 2002 and reached a peak of number 17 in the UK Singles Chart.

The song was recorded by Watson in order to raise money for Francis House Children's Hospice in Manchester, England, which had been open since 1991 but was in need of funds to avoid being closed. The plight of the hospice was highlighted by the eponymous Kirsty Howard who had appeared in several advertising campaigns and was raising money through the Kirsty Appeal. At the time of the single's release, the Kirsty Appeal fund to save Francis House stood at around £1.6 million, still £3.4 million off the target of £5 million.

== Background and production ==
The single was recorded by Russell Watson after he met Kirsty (who was born with a rare condition where her heart was back to front) at the 2002 Commonwealth Games in Manchester, England. According to a spokesman for the record label Universal Classics, Watson was encouraged to release the ballad as he "fell in love with her" and was "working to help her out". He also had a daughter who was the same age as Kirsty. Sales of the single helped the Kirsty Appeal to reach its £5 million target in 2006.

Watson visited Kirsty on her seventh birthday, where he performed “Nothing Sacred” for her. After Watson had surgery himself for a brain tumour in 2007, Kirsty was amongst his visitors, presenting him with flowers as recognition for him raising £40,000 for the appeal.

== Cover art ==
The cover of the single features pictures of Kirsty with various celebrities, including Watson, David and Victoria Beckham, the British Prime Minister at the time Tony Blair and Ronan Keating.

== Track listings ==
1. "Nothing Sacred – A Song for Kirsty" (Radio Edit)
2. "Nobody Does It Better"
3. "Nothing Sacred – A Song for Kirsty" Video

== Charts ==
Chart (2002)	Peak position
UK Singles Chart	17
