= St Paul's Catholic High School =

Location
- Firbank Road; Newall Green; Manchester, Greater Manchester, M23 2YS; England
- Coordinates: 53.38467°N 2.27928°W

Information
- Type: Academy
- Religious affiliation: Roman Catholic
- Local authority: Manchester City Council
- Department for Education URN: 139456 Tables
- Ofsted: Reports
- Headteacher: Michael Whiteside
- Gender: Coeducational
- Age: 11 to 16
- Enrolment: 863 as of April 2016
- Website: http://www.st-paulshigh.net/

St Paul's Catholic High School, also known as St Paul's RC High School, is a mixed Roman Catholic secondary school located in the Newall Green area of Manchester, England.

== History ==
=== Former schools ===
St Augustine's Grammar School was a Catholic grammar school on Stancliffe Road, Sharston Mount in the north of Wythenshawe off the A560, which opened in 1966. It became the upper school of St John Plessington High School (comprehensive) in 1977. This became part of St Paul's RC High School in 1984, and the Sharston site became derelict in 1987, and demolished in 1988.

St Columbia's and All Hallows secondary modern catholic schools in south Manchester closed in 1975 and 1994 with staff and pupils from All Hallows transferring to St John Plessington and ultimately St Paul's.

== Admissions ==
Previously a voluntary aided school administered by Manchester City Council, St Paul's Catholic High School converted to academy status on 1 April 2013. The school is administered by the Roman Catholic Diocese of Shrewsbury but continues to coordinate with Manchester City Council for admissions.

The school was graded as 'inadequate' by Ofsted in 2015, highlighting 'serious weaknesses'. In 2022 the school was graded 'good' by Ofsted.

The school is situated west of the M56 (North Cheshire Motorway). To the west nearby is Newall Green High School which closed in 2021. The present site of St Paul's on Firbank Road incorporates the original premises of St Peter's RC Primary School, which swapped property with the original St Paul's next door. St Peter's Church adjacent to the site was demolished in 1990.

=== Curriculum ===
St Paul's Catholic High School offers GCSEs and BTECs as programmes of study for pupils. Graduating students often go on to attend Loreto College and Xaverian College for sixth form education.

== Notable alumni ==
=== St Augustine's Grammar School ===
- Mark Lythgoe, British neurophysiologist
- Johnny Marr, main composer and guitarist of The Smiths
- Hughie O'Donoghue, painter
- Paul Power (footballer), left back for Manchester City
- Andy Rourke, bassist of The Smiths
- Gerry Sundquist, actor

=== St Paul's Secondary School ===
- John Bradley (known as John West in St Pauls), actor known for portraying Sam Tarly in Game of Thrones
- Kevin Kennedy (known as Kevin Williams in St Pauls), actor known for portraying Curly Watts in Coronation Street
