= East Didsbury (disambiguation) =

East Didsbury is a suburban area in Manchester to the east and south of Didsbury.

East Didsbury may also refer to:

- East Didsbury tram stop, a light rail stop in Didsbury, England; the terminus of Metrolink's South Manchester Line
- East Didsbury railway station, a heavy rail stop in Disbury England, located along the Styal Line

== See also ==
- Didsbury East (ward), electoral ward encompassing East Didsbury and much of Didsbury
