= King David High School, Manchester =

Academy in Manchester, England

Coordinates: 53.516°N 2.246°W

The King David High School
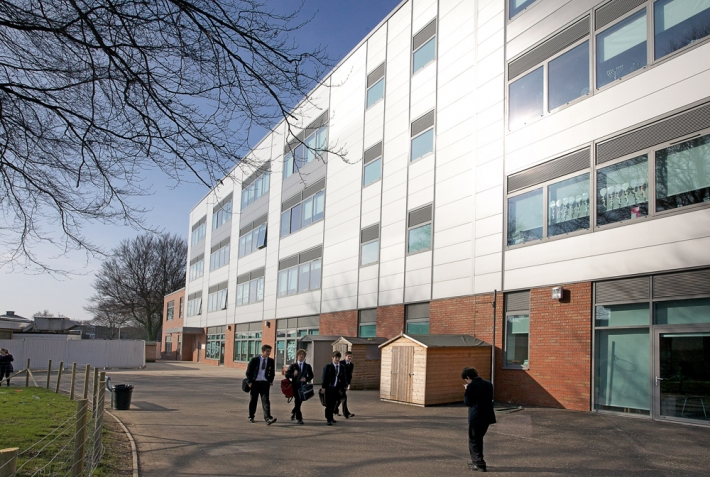
- Manchester, Manchester

Information
- Type: Academy
- Motto: Emet ve'Emunah ("True and faithful")
- Religious affiliation: Jewish
- Established: 7 September 1959
- Specialist: Mathematics and Computing
- Department for Education URN: 137309 Tables
- Ofsted: Reports
- Gender: Mixed
- Age: 11 to 19
- Enrolment: c. 850
- Website: kdhs.org.uk

The King David High School, also known as King David High School in Crumpsall, Manchester, England, is a mixed, voluntary aided Jewish Orthodox academy school with a specialism in mathematics and computing.

== History ==
The school was opened on 7 September 1959, after the Manchester Jews' School in Cheetham moved to Crumpsall.

In 2004, the school's bid to relocate to the Heaton Park area was opposed due to area conservation and increased traffic concerns.

In 2016, it was named as one of the top performing comprehensive schools in England in the GCSEs by The Daily Telegraph. The school was downgraded from the top Ofsted grade to the bottom in 2019 after inspectors had concern for the school segregating its students based on faith and gender, saying there was "unlawful segregation on the grounds of faith and belief and sex". Inspectors also found that time allocated to art, drama, food technology, and music was more for female pupils than for male pupils. In 2022, inspectors found that a "significant minority" of students did not feel like the staff treated them with respect. It received an Ofsted report of "Requires Improvement" in 2023.

In 2025, the school was named no. 6 in the list of top comprehensive secondary schools in the North West
