= Newall Green High School =

Location
- Greenbrow Road; Wythenshawe, Manchester, Greater Manchester, M23 2SX; England
- Coordinates: 53°23′02″N 2°17′20″W

Information
- Type: Academy
- Motto: Strive
- Established: 1953 (as Newall Green Secondary Modern School)
- Closed: 2021
- Local authority: Manchester
- Department for Education URN: 141392 Tables
- Ofsted: Reports
- Chair: Jenny Andrews
- Head of School: Kyra Jones
- Gender: mixed
- Age: 11 to 16
- Colours: Yellow, blue
- Website: http://www.newallgreenhigh.manchester.sch.uk/

Newall Green High School was an Academy in Wythenshawe, Manchester, England. In 2015 Newall Green High School became an Academy as part of the CHS Multi Academy Trust(MAT) - a partnership between the school, Chorlton High School and Loreto High School in Chorlton-cum-Hardy.

== Demographics ==
Newall Green High School once enrolled 996 students, including 105 students in the sixth form which opened in September 2009.

== Specialisms ==
The school was designated as an arts college in 2000, a science with mathematics college in 2004, and a vocational college in 2006, and has received the Healthy Schools Award (Gold), Investors in People status, Inclusion Charter Mark, Information and Communication Technology (ICT) Kite Mark, and the Leading Aspect Award for its collaboration with primary schools.

== Structure ==
=== SMILE ===
In 2010, Newall Green High School joined the South Manchester Inclusive Learning Enterprise (SMILE) trust, along with three feeder schools - Newall Green Primary School, Benchill Primary School, and Baguley Hall Primary School. As a result, former headteacher Neil Wilson was promoted to Executive Headteacher, and was succeeded in his previous position by Alison Wright in 2012. Wright had previously acted as interim headteacher between 2010 and 2012. Wilson retired as Executive Headteacher in 2013, leaving this position vacant.

=== STRIVE ===
In January 2015, the school began an initiative focused re-branding based upon six core learning values, known as Strive. Seeking to promote Success, Tolerance, Respect, Independence, Vision, and Excellence, the school not only positioned the Strive logo throughout its buildings, but also began branding its exercise books. Similarly, the six forms per year were renamed S, T, R, I, V, and E, respectively.

=== Academy Cooperative ===
In April 2015, the school also joined a multi-academy trust sponsored by Chorlton High School in Chorlton-cum-Hardy, thus attaining Academy status. Alison Wright initially remained headteacher of Newall Green High School (later replaced by Kyra Jones), whilst Andrew Park was appointed Executive Headteacher. The school was supervised directly by the CHS Trust Board, with Jenny Andrews chairing the Newall Green subdivision. The institute maintained autonomy over its own finance and scrutiny committees.

== Closure ==
In February 2020 it was confirmed that the school would be closing in August 2021 due to falling student numbers.
