= Newall Green =

Area of Wythenshawe, Manchester, England

Coordinates: 53.3934°N 2.2762°W

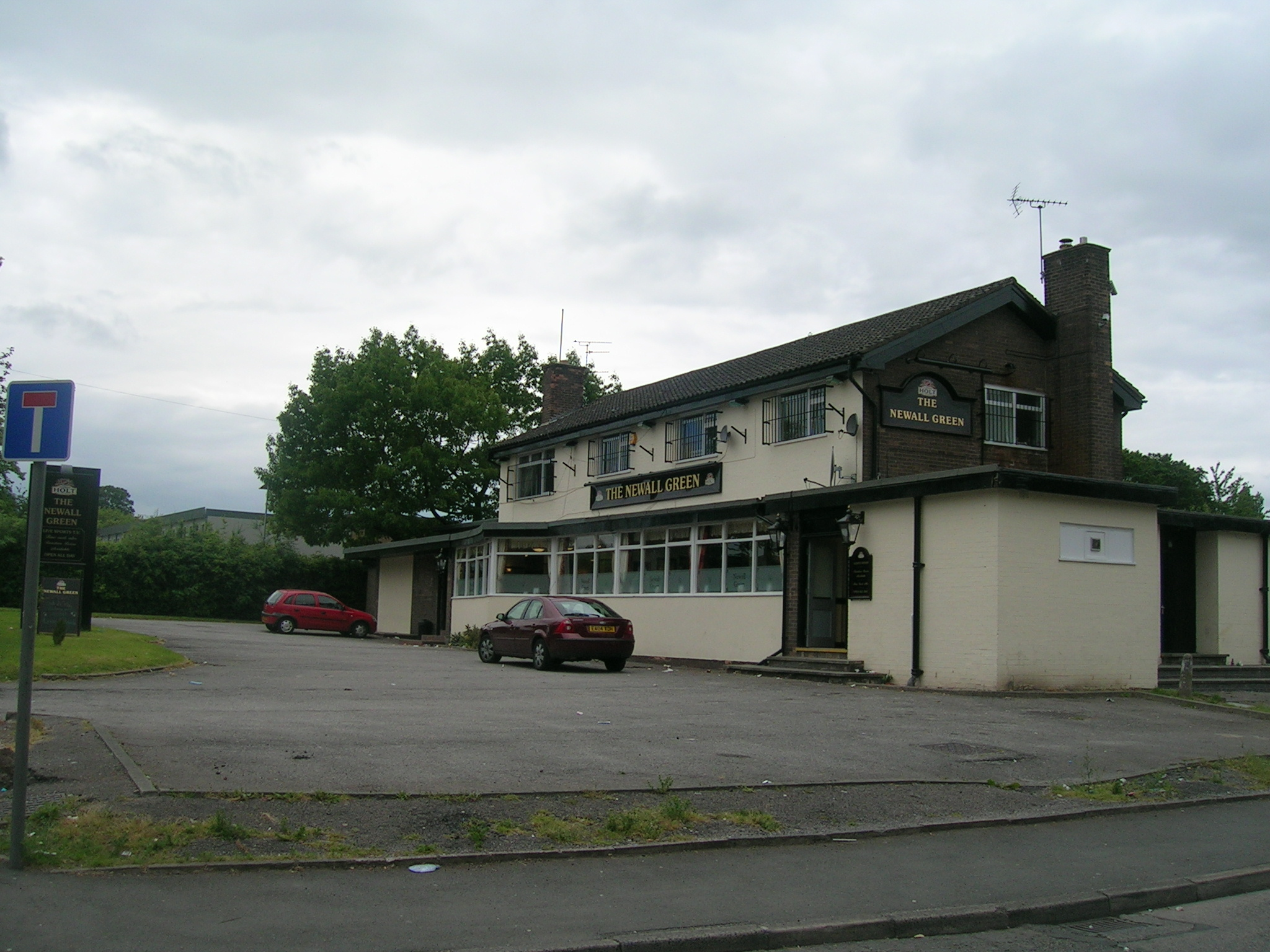
The Newall Green, Wythenshawe

Newall Green is an area in the Wythenshawe district of Manchester, England. It is on the west side of the M56 motorway, approximately 1 mile from Wythenshawe Town Centre.

Newall Green has two secondary schools, St Paul's Catholic High School and Newall Green High School and numerous primary schools. St. Paul's High School, the only Catholic secondary school in Wythenshawe, was created from the amalgamation of St. Paul's Secondary Modern, All Hallows High School, St. Columba's Secondary Modern and St. Augustine's Grammar School. It swapped sites with the adjacent St. Peter's Primary School. St. Peter's RC Church stood next to the primary school until demolished in 1998.

It was named after Newall Green Farm (oldest form New Hall Green ), whose farmhouse was built in 1594, and is a registered grade II Listed building. In 2014 an arson attack badly damaged the building. But 2018 the buildings were repaired and converted into supportive accommodation for vulnerable adults.

The area was owned by the Massey family and tithed out to farmers and market gardeners. Rolling Gate farm to the south ( later ?mistranscribed to Roaring Gate farm ), Newall Green Farm, Knob Hall and Mill House and White House farms all fell within the present day Newall Green area which was created with the development of Wythenshawe from 1937.

The area is centred around the Mill Brook. This stream originally rose from springs in the Woodhouse Park and Heald Green areas. From the early 1800s to c1870 it fed the Mill Pond serving as the reservoir for the Baguley Corn Mill where the stream passes under Tuffley Road. The stream is now culverted from its source to Millbrook Road. It eventually joins the Fairy Well brook and runs into the Bridgewater canal in Sale.

Tithe maps show mostly enclosed grassland throughout the area, with small stands of fruit trees and cottages to the north of the Mill Brook up to 1900. Until the development of the council estates, Truck Lane was the main route through Newall Green from the Newall farm to Halveley Hey and Hall Lane near what is now Wythenshawe park. There is a substantial brick bridge serving the remaining pathway of Truck Lane, which appears on the earliest maps and must therefore be one of the oldest structures in Wythenshawe. Mill House stood by the bridge from early 1800s to late 1940s and together with the corn mill and its farm on what today is Firbank Road/ M56, would have been at the centre of the Newall Green area.

Until the 1970s there were other traces of old Newall Green. The basin of the Mill Pond was bogland and home to water reeds and pond snails - it was filled in with the construction of new homes in the 1990s when the allotments were also built over and more of the Mill Brook culverted. Granite stones of the Mill could be found around the culvert and sluice of c1790, and the overflow channel of the brook still existed as a deep cut adjacent to Millbrook Road. Ordnance survey maps of the 19th century showed parallel lines of trees along the brook - a single ash tree still stands and its girth suggests an age of at least 180 years old. Ruined half timbered elevations stood near the brook as it passed under Greenbrow Road ( named from Green Brow Lane in the 19th century ) and moribund pear trees grew nearby. Other signs of the pastoral history of the area were common until the council began regular mowing and clearing of the fields and culverting the stream : hazel, starwort, figwort and brooklime grew around the brook, and wheat and barley in the meadow. The only remnants of Mill House by the 1960s were cultivated lilacs and a line of sloe bushes. A spring recorded in the earliest maps of 1800 still rises where the Millbrook turns through 90 degrees to parallel Whitburn Road - the spring was originally part of a stream network from the Peter's Spinney fields where great crested newts were abundant until the M56 was constructed starting 1970.

The Mill Brook meadows are a green belt remnant of the pastoral days of Wythenshawe after the medieval willow forest was cleared for land use.
