= Kirsty Howard =

English children's hospice advocate (1995-2015)

Kirsty Ellen Howard (20 September 1995 – 24 October 2015) was an English children's hospice advocate known for her fundraising efforts for Francis House Children's Hospice in Didsbury, Manchester. As a patient of the hospice, Howard was the figurehead of the Kirsty's Club (formerly known as the Kirsty's Appeal), a charity dedicated for fundraising for the facility, which was severely underfunded at the time. Her efforts gained national support and attention. At the time of her death, she had raised over £7.5 million for the hospice.

== Birth and illness ==
Kirsty Howard was born on 20 September 1995 at the Wythenshawe Hospital, Manchester, to Lynn and Steve Howard of Northern Moor, the youngest of three sisters. Shortly after her birth, Howard was discovered to have a serious congenital heart defect: her heart was back to front, causing the misplacement of her internal organs. The condition, a form of situs ambiguus, is exceptionally rare and has an occurrence of one in 60 million; only one case was reported previously. After surviving 11 operations, including 9 heart surgeries, Howard was considered too fragile to receive anaesthesia and the only option was palliative care. She needed around-the-clock care, including continuous oxygen therapy through a nasal cannula connected to a 45 pounds (20 kg) cylinder. In February 1999, she was declared to have only six weeks to live and admitted to Francis House Children's Hospice.

== Children's hospice advocacy ==
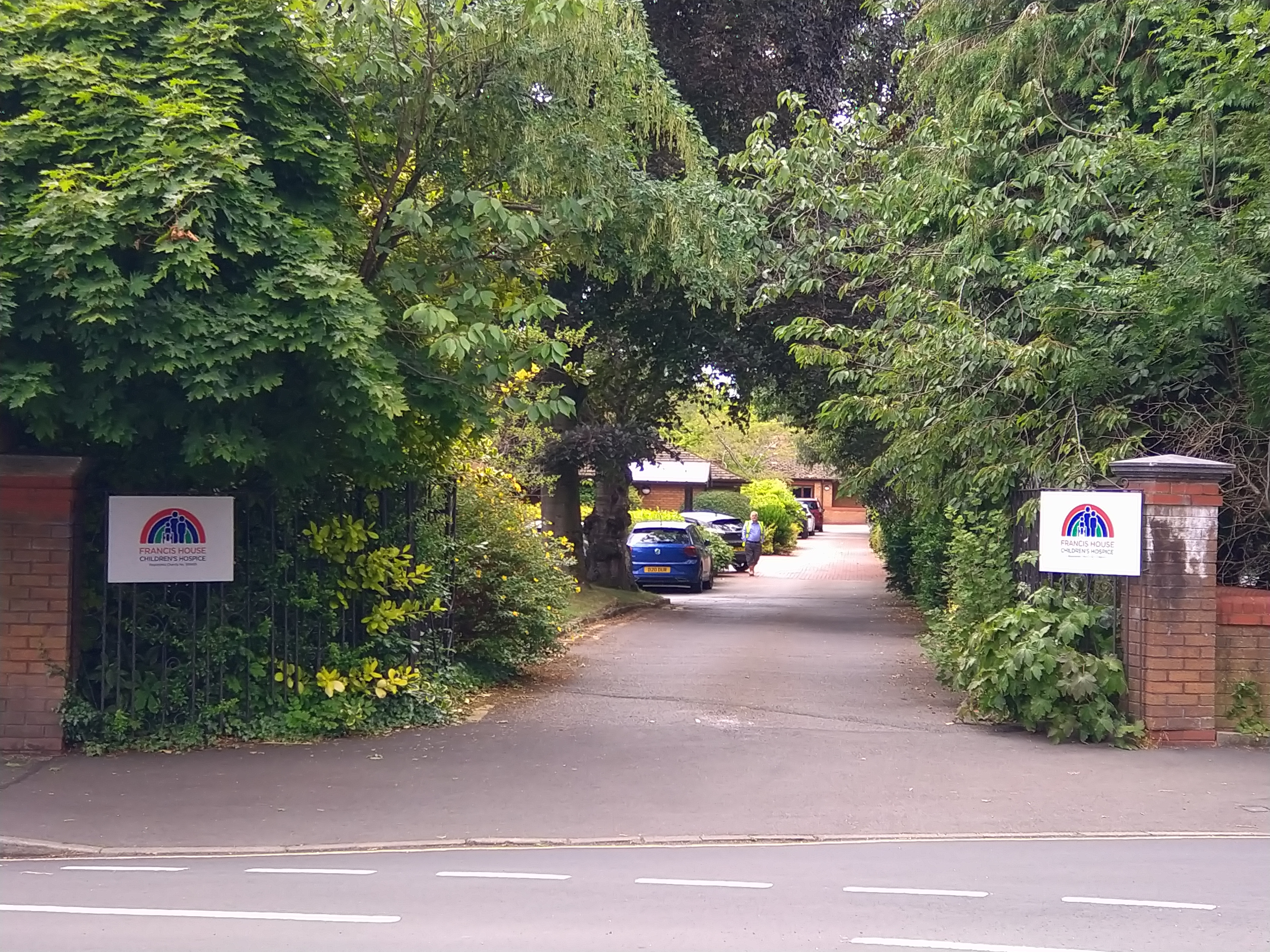
Francis House Children's Hospice in July 2022

Opened in November 1991 by Diana, Princess of Wales, Francis House Children's Hospice is the fifth children's hospice in the UK and one of the oldest around the world. Like most children's hospices in the country, the charity receives little public funding and relies on donations extensively. By the time Howard was admitted in 1999, it was in severe financial difficulties and required at least £5 million (equivalent to £7.73 million in 2021) to continue its operation. Piccadilly Radio presenter Susie Mathis, who had been paying attention to the facility since its start, decided to take the challenge of designing a fundraising campaign with her team. Their first ad, which was designed by advertisement agencies, failed to receive attention despite appearing in several newspapers. Mathis realised that a real-life figure was needed to gain sympathy from the public and Howard became a perfect choice.

On 6 October 2001, Howard was the mascot for the 2002 World Cup qualifying match between England and Greece. Commentator John Motson called her "the bravest person on the pitch", as she accompanied captain David Beckham onto the pitch with her 20 kg oxygen tank.

In 2002, Howard, along with Beckham, presented the Jubilee Baton to Queen Elizabeth II during the opening ceremony of the 2002 Commonwealth Games in Manchester. Russell Watson released the single "Nothing Sacred - A Song for Kirsty" in December to help her fundraising and it reached a peak of number 17 on the UK Singles Chart.

In 2003, Howard started the inaugural Junior and Mini Great Manchester Run, and took part in the race herself, via wheelchair, wearing the Number 1 vest. She continued to do this throughout the history of the event, even after she became 16 years old when she was too old to officially take part in the event. She also joined the full 10 km race in her last years, pushed by her team.

In 2006, Richard Fleeshman sang for Howard on Soapstar Superstar and donated his £200,000 prize money to The Kirsty Appeal.

Howard's new fundraising target was to raise a further £2,000,000 to build an extension to the Francis House hospice. This will not be named after her, but dedicated to her.

== Awards and honours ==
Howard was awarded the Helen Rollason Award by the BBC in 2004, for her courage and determination in her fundraising efforts. She also received the Child of Courage Award (2001) and the Pride of Britain Award (2002). For her efforts in fundraising, Manchester City Council gave Howard their Young Citizen of the Year award in 2007. In recognition of her contributions to her community, Howard was awarded the Diana Award; the certificate given to her by tenor Russell Watson at the secondary school she attended.

In September 2014 Howard received an "Outstanding Achievement Award" from the children's charity Variety. In December 2014 Howard was named 'Ultimate Woman of Courage' by Cosmopolitan magazine.

== Death ==
Howard died on 24 October 2015 at the Manchester Royal Infirmary with her family at her bedside after developing first a kidney infection and then a heart attack. Her funeral was held on 3 November at St Michael and All Angels Church, Northern Moor. Hundreds of mourners attended the funeral, including a number of celebrities.

She is buried at Southern Cemetery, Manchester.

== Legacy ==
A JustGiving page has been set up through the Kirsty Club at https://www.justgiving.com/kirstyclub/. The number one plate of Junior and Mini Great Manchester Run, which she always wore in the race, was retired in her honour.
