= Plant Hill Arts College =

Coordinates: 53.530°N 2.222°W

- Blackley, Manchester; United Kingdom

Information
- Type: Secondary school and Arts College
- Motto: Your Passport to Success
- Established: 1950's
- Closed: 31 August 2010
- Local authority: Manchester City Council
- Department for Education URN: 105559 Tables
- Ofsted: Reports
- Headteacher: Dana Ross-Wawrzynski
- Gender: Mixed
- Age: 11 to 16
- Enrolment: 822 students
- Colours: Navy Blue & Gold
- Former Name: Plant Hill High School
- Website: Schools-online.org

Plant Hill Arts College (formally Plant Hill High School) was an 11-16 community school, serving boys and girls predominantly from the suburb of Blackley, Manchester. The school had approximately 820 pupils on roll before it was replaced by the Co-operative Academy of Manchester. The school was in close proximity to the M60 motorway affording it excellent links, by road, to a wide area. It was also well served by public transport.

== Plant Hill as a Specialist Arts College ==
In September 2005 Plant Hill High School was awarded specialist status and became Plant Hill Arts College. This had a huge impact on student learning by enhancing the curriculum, with additional provision in

- Performing Arts – music, drama, dance, media studies
- Visual Art – fine art, 3D art, painting and drawing
- Media Arts – ICT, E-media

== Plant Hill becomes Co-operative Academy of Manchester ==
Plant Hill Arts College, became the Co-operative Academy of Manchester as part of an overhaul of education in the city. Seven new academies in Manchester opened in September 2010 under the scheme. Plans for the Plant Hill site have been revealed as a 900-place high school and 120-place sixth form. The part-private academy, backed by the Co-operative Group, will specialise in finance and business studies. New facilities on the Plant Hill Road site will be made available to the public for sports and adult education outside school hours.

see... The Co-operative Academy of Manchester

== Exam results ==
The number of students achieving 5 or more A* - C GCSE grades.

=== Percentage of pupils achieving 5+ A* - C ===
- 2002 18%
- 2003 28%
- 2004 31%
- 2005 35%
- 2006 23%
- 2007 24%
- 2008 32%
- 2009 17%
- 2010 42%

Ofsted Report

== Former School facilities ==
- A purpose built sports hall
- A music and drama suite
- A swimming pool
- 5 MFL rooms
- Learning support rooms for pupils with special needs
- 7 Science rooms
- 6 Technology rooms, including textile and food rooms
- 5 Humanities rooms
- 4 Computer rooms
- Library and study centre
- Careers base
- Pastoral base
- 2 Visual Arts Rooms

== Controversy ==
=== Truancy ===
It was one of two schools to register more than one in four pupils in this category with 26.5 per cent, The figures were revealed in a school performance league tables published which list the percentage of pupils persistently truanting for the first time.

=== Refusing to re-admit a former pupil ===
Plant Hill refusing to re-admit a former pupil who they claimed was too far behind in his GCSE studies to catch up. Council education bosses looked urgently at finding alternative tuition for the schoolboy 15, who had been sat at home for five months, despite insisting he wants to return to school. The LEA had ordered Plant Hill Arts College to admit the schoolboy after he was refused entry, but the school appealed to the Secretary of State Alan Johnson, who decided against forcing them to comply.

=== "Happy Slapping" attack ===
A schoolgirl of 16 years old was attacked in Blackley and was left unconscious in a vicious "happy slapping" attack on 9 May 2005. Footage of the attack was circulated on pupils' mobile phones.

The child's angry mother contacted national and local journalists in response to her daughter's attack. The child's mother commented that Plant Hill High had not taken tough action, even though the attack was a series of bullying incidents she had reported to the school. A request for an assembly to confiscate the mobile phones had been refused. At the time of going to national and local press, Plant Hill High School had refused to comment.

== Notable former pupils ==
- Hasney Aljofree, professional footballer, Oldham Athletic A.F.C
