= Wythenshawe Park =

Park in Manchester, England

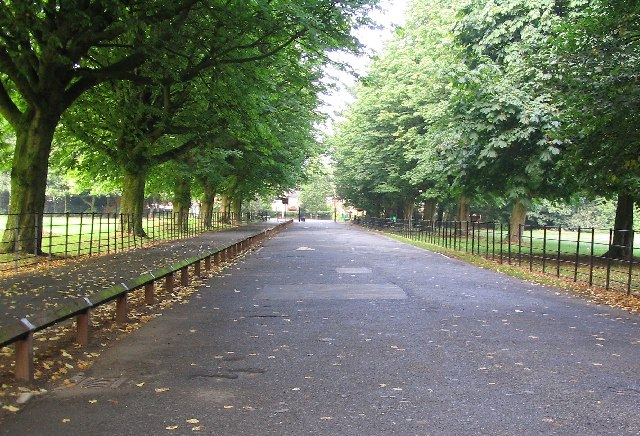
- The Driveway in Wythenshawe Park
- Interactive map of Wythenshawe Park
- Type: Public
- Location: Wythenshawe, Manchester
- Coordinates: 53°24′15″N 2°16′29″W
- Area: 270 acres (110 ha)
- Created: 1926
- Operator: Manchester City Council
- Awards: Green Flag
- Public transit: Wythenshawe Park tram stop
- Website: manchester.gov.uk

Wythenshawe Park in Wythenshawe, south Manchester, England, covers an area of 270 acres. Wythenshawe Hall lies at its centre.

The park features woodland, bedding, grassland and meadows, sporting facilities, Wythenshawe community farm and a horticulture centre.

== History ==
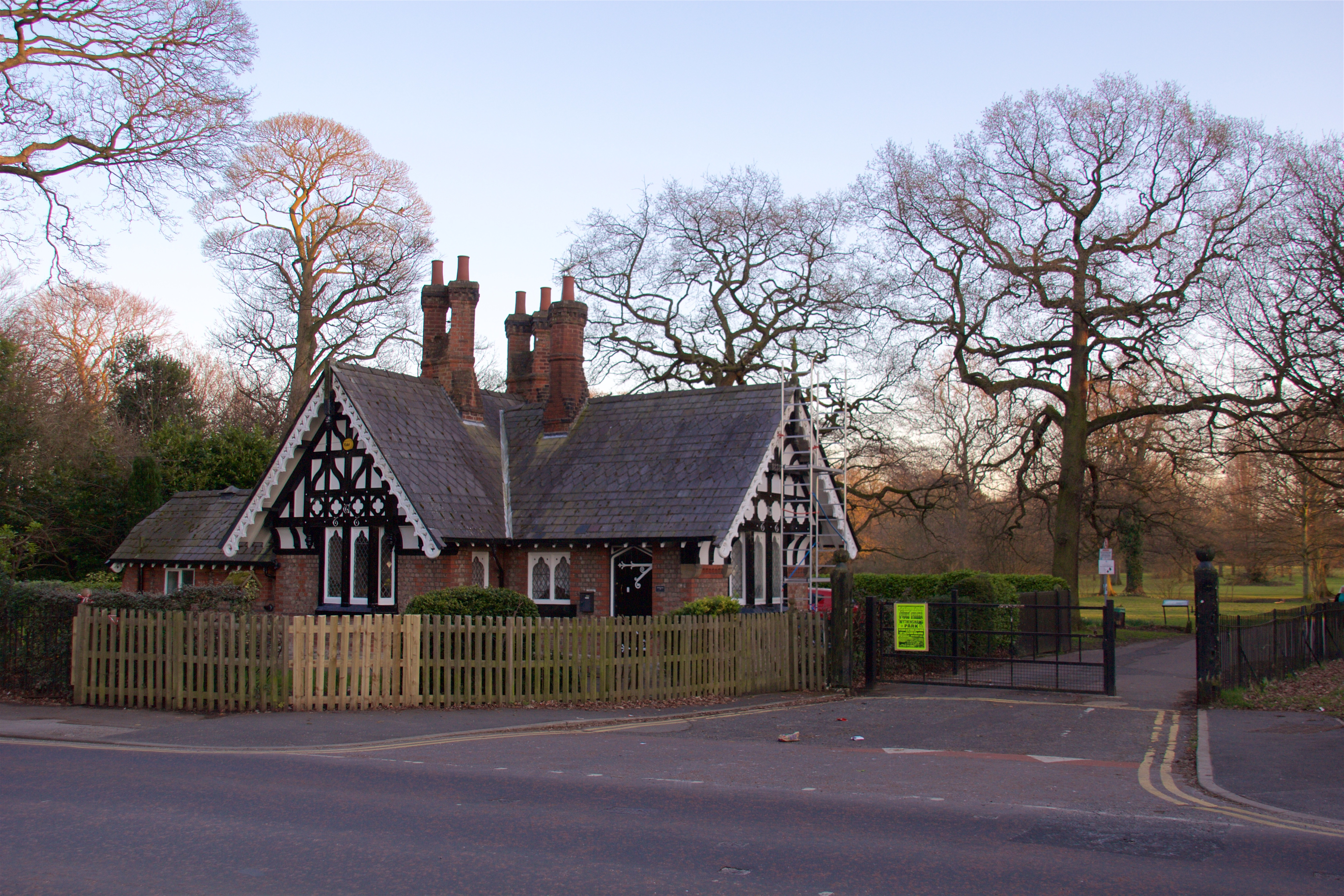
Wythenshawe Park North Lodge

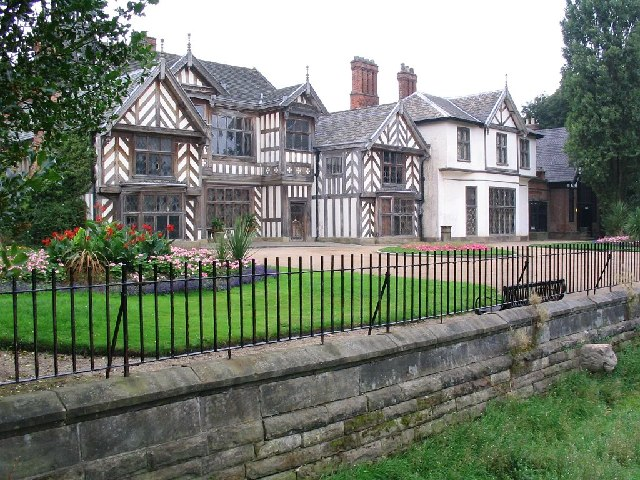
The 16th-century Wythenshawe Hall

The land now bounded by Wythenshawe Park was originally demesne land belonging to the wealthy Tatton family, from at least 1297 onwards. According to documents from the 13th century, the land was enclosed as a deer park for the purpose of hunting.

There is no evidence of any manor house until the 16th century, when Robert Tatton of Chester built a new family home here around 1540. Wythenshawe (or Withenshawe) Hall was built as a timber-framed Tudor house, possibly surrounded originally by a moat. It became the home of the Tatton family for almost 400 years.

In 1641, Robert Tatton of Chester's descendant, also named Robert Tatton, commissioned a survey of the estate from a Richard Martinscroft, who prepared a map of the tenanted and demesne lands.

Soon after, Wythenshawe Hall was caught up in the hostilities of the English Civil War. Robert Tatton was a Royalist, and in the winter of 1643–44, the house was besieged by Parliamentarian forces and seized. After the Restoration of the monarchy, Wythenshawe Hall was returned to the Tatton Family.

The first evidence of landscaping in the grounds date to the 1641 estate map. Further landscaping was added in about 1830, replacing fields.

The structures of a farm that was located west of Wythenshawe Hall have survived as park maintenance buildings. North Lodge, a Grade II-listed gate lodge at the northern entrance to the park was built in the Tudor style in the mid to late 19th century.

The Wythenshawe estate remained in the Tatton family possession until 1926, when the Hall and 250 acres of the estate were purchased by Sir Ernest Simon and his wife Shena Simon. They presented Wythenshawe Park and the Hall to the Manchester Corporation "to be kept forever as an open space for the people of Manchester". At this time, the Corporation was developing Wythenshawe as a new garden suburb of Manchester to provide housing for families who were moved out of the city to allow slum clearance, and Wythenshawe Park was set aside to provide a recreational green space for the new Wythenshawe housing estate.

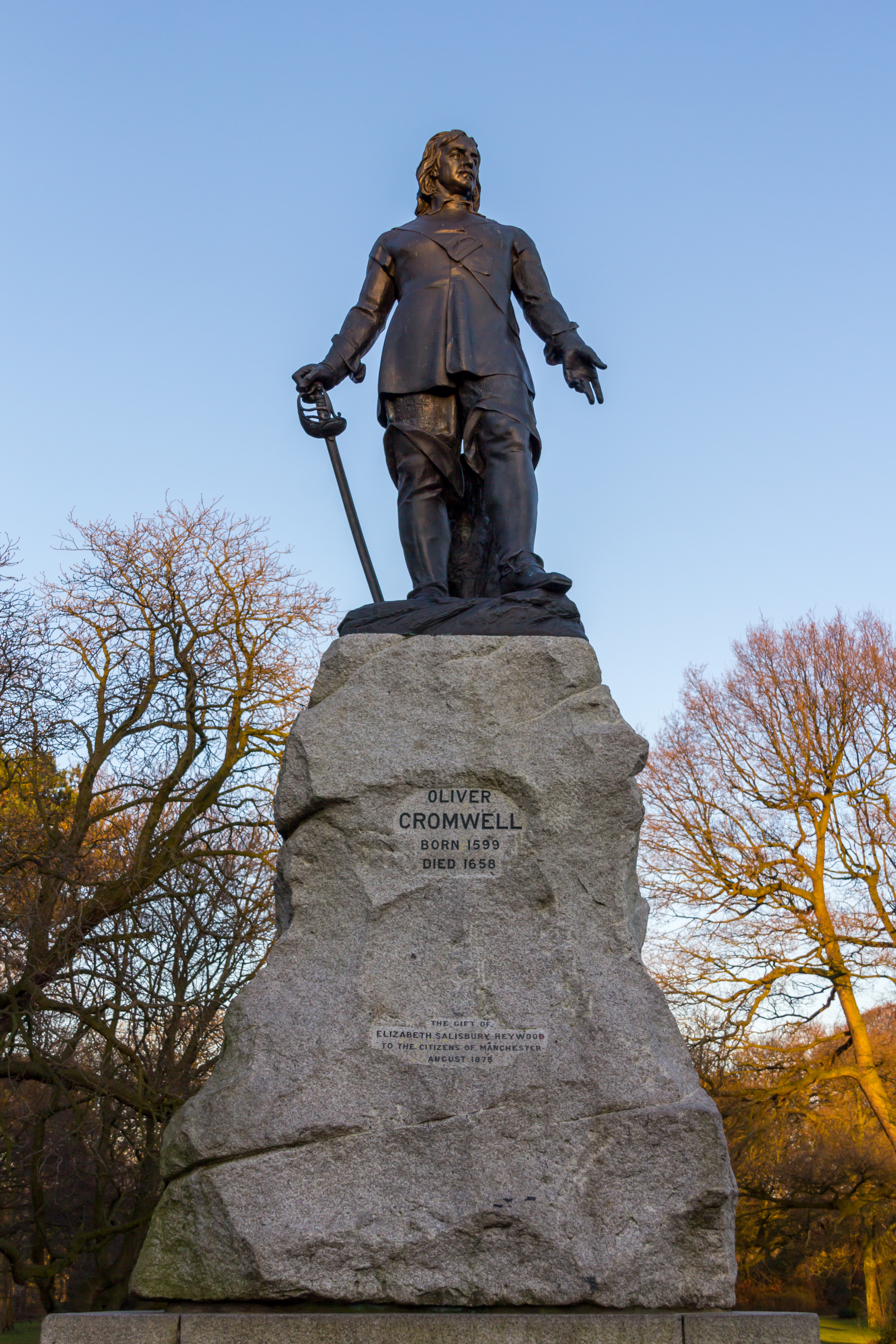
Statue of Oliver Cromwell in the park

In 1968, a 7.16-metre (23.5 ft)-tall bronze statue of Oliver Cromwell on a granite plinth and pedestal was relocated to Wythenshawe Park. Sculpted by Matthew Noble, it had originally stood on Deansgate in Manchester city centre. From its inception, the statue had proved politically controversial, advocated by Radical Liberals but denounced by conservatives. Eventually, its location was found to be obstructing traffic, and the statue was re-sited to Wythenshawe Park, commemorating Wythenshawe Hall's association with the Civil War. Within weeks, the statue was vandalised with paint and Cromwell's sword was stolen. The statue was listed Grade II in 1994 by English Heritage.

In 2016, Wythenshawe Hall was severely damaged by fire during an arson attack. The structure is currently undergoing restoration work but as of 2024 is open to the public on certain days.

== Facilities ==
Wythenshawe Park has a range of leisure, sporting, and educational facilities open to the public, including an athletics track, café, a baseball field, football pitches, a pavilion, an orienteering course, horse riding facilities and tennis courts. It is also home to a horticultural centre and the Wythenshawe community farm, which has been set up to educate urban children about food production in a working farm setting.

== Live From Wythenshawe Park ==
Since 2023, Wythenshawe Park has hosted an annual series of large-scale outdoor concerts under the "Live From Wythenshawe Park" banner.

=== 2023 ===
- 25 August – Lewis Capaldi (cancelled; with Lizzy McAlpine announced as support)
- 26 August – Noel Gallagher's High Flying Birds, with Primal Scream, Future Islands, Billy Nomates and Picture Parlour

=== 2024 ===
- 24 August – New Order, with Johnny Marr, Róisín Murphy, Nadine Shah, KYRIS and DJ Tin Tin
- 25 August – Blossoms, with Inhaler, Shed Seven, The K's, Seb Lowe, TTRRUUCES and The Guest List

=== 2025 ===
- 23 August – Fontaines D.C., with Kneecap, English Teacher and The Murder Capital
- 24 August – Sam Fender, with Olivia Dean, Charlie Noordewier and Bugman

=== 2026 ===
- 21 August – The Cure, with Slowdive and The Slow Readers Club
- 22 August – Lewis Capaldi, with Loyle Carner
- 28 August – Pulp, with Self Esteem and Seb Lowe
- 29 August – Courteeners, with The Vaccines, The Coral, Getdown Services and Girl In The Year Above
- 30 August – The Prodigy, with Carl Cox, Andy C, David Rodigan, Yousuke Yukimatsu and Scarlxrd

== See also ==
- Wythenshawe Park Metrolink station
