= Wythenshawe community farm =

Educational farm in Manchester, England

Coordinates: 53.4046°N 2.2813°W

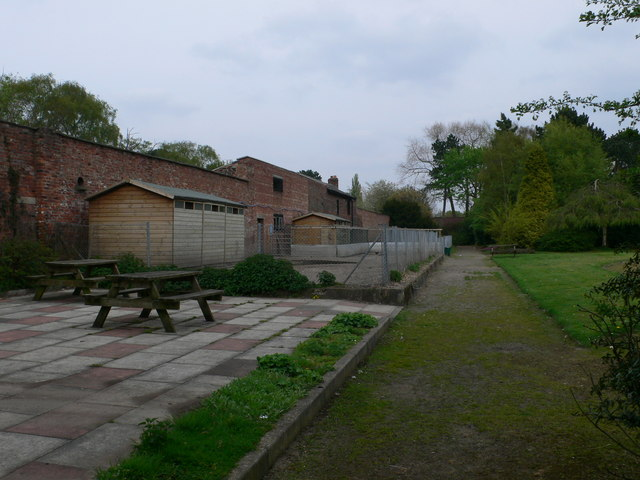
Wythenshawe Community Farm

Wythenshawe Community Farm is an educational farm based in Wythenshawe Park, South Manchester. Although set in an urban environment, it operates as a working countryside farm. It was founded by Leslie Howard, a teacher, and was established in 1984 in Sharston, before moving to Wythenshawe Park. It is open all days of the week.

The farm gives children the opportunity to see animals and plants and has a wide selection of farm animals including pigs, sheep, goats, cows and horses, and it often has baby animals on site due to its breeding programme. Its herd of Hereford cattle has won prizes. The farm's walled garden, located behind the farm, used to supply fruit and vegetables to Wythenshawe Hall.
