= Manchester Enterprise Academy =

Location
- Simonsway; Wythenshawe; Manchester, Greater Manchester, M22 9RH; England; 53.38075°N 2.27172°W

Information
- Type: Academy
- Motto: A fantastic future for all
- Established: September 2009
- Local authority: Manchester City Council
- Department for Education URN: 136089 Tables
- Ofsted: Reports
- Gender: Coeducational
- Age: 11 to 18
- Colours: Blue and green
- Website: http://www.manchesterenterpriseacademy.org.uk/

Manchester Enterprise Academy is a coeducational secondary school and sixth form with academy status. It is located in the Wythenshawe area of Manchester, England.

Poundswick Grammar School was founded on the site in 1956, and was renamed Poundswick High School in 1967 when it merged with Oldwood Secondary Modern School to become a comprehensive school. In 1999 Poundswick High School and South Manchester High School merged to form Parklands High School on the Poundswick site. The school converted to academy status in 2009 and was renamed Manchester Enterprise Academy. Construction of a new building on part of the original Poundswick site was completed in 2010 and the original Poundswick Grammar School buildings were demolished.

Manchester Enterprise Academy is sponsored by Manchester Airports Group, The Manchester College, Manchester United Foundation and Wythenshawe Community Housing Group. The school offers GCSEs, BTECs and OCR Nationals as programmes of study for pupils, while students in the sixth form have the option to study from a range of A-levels and further BTECs.
