= Dixons Brooklands Academy =

Coordinates: 53.4020°N 2.2956°W

- Manchester; England

Information
- Type: Academy
- Motto: Work hard, have integrity, be kind
- Established: January 1st 2022
- Trust: Dixons Academy Trust
- Department for Education URN: 148965 Tables
- Ofsted: Reports
- Head teacher: Kristy Gardner
- Staff: 234
- Gender: all genders
- Age: 11 to 16
- Enrolment: 1030
- Colours: Red and black
- Website: https://www.dixonsat.com/brooklands

Dixons Brooklands Academy, also known as DBK, is a mixed-sex secondary school in Wythenshawe, Manchester, England.

== History ==
In 1957, two separate schools opened, West Wythenshawe Technical High School for Girls and West Wythenshawe Technical High School for Boys. The schools' facilities included sports fields, tennis courts, science labs and a library. A statue, commissioned by Mitzi Cunliffe, who designed the Bafta, was erected outside the boys' gymnasium. In 1967, the two schools merged to form Brookway High School comprehensive, with mixed classes.

In 2003, the school was then awarded sports college status and renamed Brookway High School and Sports College. Following this, a £3 million facility was built on the site, featuring two sports halls, three classrooms and a large gym, for use by both the school and the local community.

=== Closure and rebuild ===
In 2009, Manchester City Council invested almost £200 million to improve the schools in the Manchester area. The original Brookway High School and Sports College/Manchester Health Academy building was demolished and a new £20 million building for Manchester Health Academy was completed in 2010.

In July 2008, Barry Burke, the headteacher at Rhyddings Business and Enterprise School in Oswaldtwistle, was appointed Principal of Manchester Health Academy, taking up his post in January 2009. In August 2013, he retired from his position, being succeeded by Damien Owen.

Following poor results and negative Ofsted inspections, in January 2022 Manchester Health Academy became part of the Dixons Academy Trust and was renamed Dixons Brooklands Academy.

== Facilities ==
The academy consists of two buildings; One consisting of 3 floors, and received an extension of an atrium in 2019, where the majority of lessons take place. The other contains the sports hall, assembly hall, and dance studio, being a single storey.

The Academy also features a public library, which is operated by Manchester Library & Information Service.

In 2016, Manchester City Council invited the school to expand its student population. A £10 million transformation of the school's estate saw the addition of a new dining room extension, multi-use games area and FA-standard all-weather pitch, together with a new maths and English building.

Former Manchester United footballer Denis Irwin officially opened the school's new all-weather pitch in November 2017. The new floodlit playing surface complements the school's existing sports facilities.

== Notable former pupils ==
=== Brookway High School ===
- Billy Duffy, guitarist of The Cult
