= Chorlton High School =

Location
- Nell Lane; Manchester, M21 7SL; England; 53.4365°N 2.2649°W

Information
- Type: Academy
- Established: 1924
- Department for Education URN: 139148 Tables
- Ofsted: Reports
- Head teacher: Z. Morris
- Gender: Coeducational
- Age: 11 to 16
- Enrolment: 1519
- Executive headteacher: A Park
- Website: http://www.chorltonhigh.manchester.sch.uk/

Chorlton High School is a coeducational secondary school with academy status, located in Chorlton-cum-Hardy, Manchester, England. It has around 1500 pupils and 300 in each of its 5 years.

== History ==
=== Grammar school ===
There was a "Chorlton High School" in the 19th century run by Dr William Ballantyne Hodgson, this Chorlton High School (for Boys) was founded in September 1924 with 110 boys due to the growing need to educate older local boys. The first headmaster was A. F. Chappell, appointed in 1925. During Second World War it was twice evacuated to Fleetwood, owing to the Blitz; school records for the period during the war are sketchy, as the boys were moved around multiple times. The first headmaster retired in 1951 and was succeeded by Mr Merriman a year later. In 1952 it became a grammar school as pupil numbers started increasing again. The third and final headmaster was C. A. Crofts, appointed in 1963. There was at one time a lower school in Darley Avenue (formerly Barlow Hall School).

=== Comprehensive ===
During the 1960s it returned to its comprehensive roots. The existing building of Chorlton High School at Nell Lane (built in the early 1960s) co-existed with the Grammar School for a number of years. At this At this point the present Chorlton High did not replace the two combined schools but existed alongside it. The Sandy Lane/Corkland Road site was closed and the buildings demolished some years later. In the early years it was called Oakwood High School. Chorlton Grammar School on Corkland Road merged with Barlow Hall Secondary Modern School in 1967, when all of Manchester's secondary state schools became comprehensive. Oakwood High School was the name give to the school, formed by the amalgamation of Wilbraham High School and Chorlton High School in the early 1980s. The current site of Chorlton High School at Nell Lane, was the original site of the Wilbraham High School Upper School.

It was designated a specialist Arts College in 2002. In May 2012, the school governors approved the controversial decision to convert into an academy. The school became an academy on 1 January 2013.

== Notable people ==
A recording studio commemorates Maurice Gibb, though none of the Bee Gees studied at Chorlton High School. They went to the nearby Oswald Road primary school but the family then emigrated to Australia.

=== Chorlton High School ===
- Trevor Davey, Member of Parliament (New Zealand)
- Tosin Adarabioyo, Centre-back for Chelsea

=== Oakwood High School ===
- Andrea Ashworth, author of the memoir, Once in a House on Fire.
- Danielle Jawando, author
- David Joseph Henry, Writer and human rights activist.
- David Judge, Actor, playwright and performance poet.
- Jason Manford, Comedian, television and radio presenter.
- Sarah Champion (journalist), Manchester music journalist, author and editor

=== Wilbraham High School ===
- David Threlfall, English stage, film and television actor and director. Frank Gallagher (Shameless).
- Alex Williams, English football player for Manchester City

=== Didsbury Technical High School ===
- Jim Cumbes, cricketer and goalkeeper for Aston Villa
- Paul Hart, defender for Leeds United
- Keith Newton, defender for Blackburn Rovers and Burnley
- Sir Michael Turner CBE FRAeS, Chief Executive from 2002 to 2008 of BAE Systems, and chairman since 2008 of Babcock International and from 2012 of GKN

=== Chorlton Grammar School ===
- Peter Barnes, Footballer and Sports Pundit.
- Frank Cohen
- Trevor Davey (1926–2012), member of the New Zealand House of Representatives (1972–1975)
- Jack Eccles CBE, President of the Trades Union Congress (1985–1986)
- Roy Gibson, Director General from 1985 to 1987 of the British National Space Centre, and Director General from 1975 to 1980 of the European Space Agency (ESA)
- John Gwynne, darts commentator, father of Andrew Gwynne, the independent MP for Gorton and Denton since 2024 and the Labour MP for Denton and Reddish between 2005 and 2024
- Harry Hargreaves, was an English cartoonist
- Graham Paddon, midfielder for Norwich City
- Hannah Elizabeth Pipe, (1831–1906), headteacher

=== Former staff ===
- Adrian Henri – taught at the school during the 1950s.
