= Church of St Michael and All Angels, Northenden =

St Michael's, Northenden
- Church of St Michael and All Angels
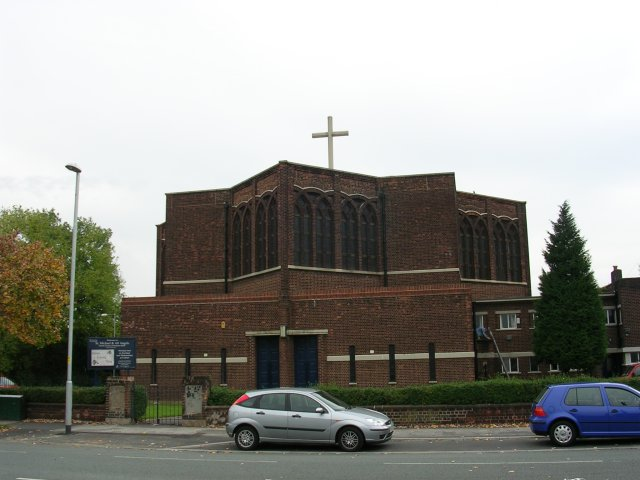

- Location in Manchester
- 53.4099°N 2.2821°W
- OS grid reference: SJ 81344 90378
- Location: Northenden, Manchester
- Country: England
- Denomination: Church of England

History
- Founded: 1935
- Dedication: St Michael and All Angels

Architecture
- Heritage designation: Grade II*
- Architect: Nugent Francis Cachemaille-Day

Administration
- Diocese: Diocese of Manchester
- Archdeaconry: Manchester
- Deanery: Withington

The Church of St Michael and All Angels, Orton Road, Lawton Moor, Northenden, Manchester, is an Anglican church of 1935-7 by N. F.Cachemaille-Day. Pevsner describes the church as "sensational for its country and its time". The church has been listed Grade II* on the National Heritage List for England since 16 January 1981.

== History ==
After the end of the First World War, Manchester faced a housing crisis, with large numbers of poor people living in slum conditions. The council looked at buying land south of the River Mersey, but the cost of land near Wythenshawe meant that the scheme was almost abandoned. However, Sir Ernest and Shena Simon, who were social reformers from nearby Didsbury, stepped in and bought Wythenshawe Hall and 250 acres (100 ha) of parkland in 1926. They donated it to the council, which significantly reduced the cost of buying the rest of the land needed for housing. Shena Simon then worked with Richard Barry Parker to develop the area as a garden city in the early 1930s, and also worked with the first new residents to create a sense of community.

The Simon's actions enabled the Corporation of Manchester to acquire over 5,000 acres (2,000 ha) of land, on which they would eventually build 25,000 dwellings, housing a population of 100,000. The project included areas of greenbelt, agricultural land and open parkland, with employment provided by two industrial zones. It spanned the three ancient parishes of Baguley, Northenden, and Northen Etchells. The garden suburb was designated part of the parish of St Wilfrid's, Northenden but the small parish church proved insufficient to accommodate the rising congregation, and a mission church was opened in 1934.

On 10 April 1935 the diocese approved plans for the construction of a new parish church and rectory on Orton Road. It would serve the district known at the time as Lawton Moor, and now known as Northern Moor. The budget was limited to £10,000. Nugent Francis Cachemaille-Day was appointed as architect for both the church and the adjoining rectory. He had previously designed the church of St Nicholas in Burnage, around 5 miles (8 km) to the north east of Northern Moor. He produced a first draft of plans by June 1935, which was for a church building with a fairly traditional floor plan. It included a vestry for the choir on the south side, and a corridor that linked it to the rectory. However, he produced a second plan in 1936, for a radically different building. The link to the rectory was retained, but the main building was shaped like an eight-pointed star formed from two interlocking squares, and it was this design that was built. The foundation stone for the church was laid on 8 May 1937, by the Bishop of Manchester, the Rt Revd Dr Guy Warman. The builder was J. Clayton and Sons of Denton, and it was completed in time for it to be consecrated in December 1937.

The rectory was built to the June 1935 plans. Work began in October 1935, and the house was completed by May 1936. It was shown as "existing rectory" on the second draft of Cachemaille-Day's plans for the church. The design was not conventional, as it had a reinforced concrete first floor, and a flat roof. It was occupied by Rev H Nightingale in June 1936.

Michael Barber, FRS (1934 – 1991) was a chemist and mass spectrometrist who became the church organist. His father was a carpenter who had been the main carpenter in the construction of the church building. In addition, he had designed and built a bishop's chair, which he presented to the church, and subsequently was involved in building a pipe organ in the building. His father died when Barber was quite young, but he began playing the organ in the church when he was 15. He was encouraged in this by George Elmsley, the senior organist who fostered a love of church organ music in the young Barber. He later succeeded Elmsley, and was the church organist for the rest of his life.

== Architecture ==
The plan of the church is a star, comprising two inter-locked squares. The square which has its corners aligned east-west is larger than that with its sides aligned east-west, creating a larger area at the eastern point of the star, sufficient to accommodate the altar. The site on which it was built was waterlogged, and the reinforced concrete frame is supported by foundations which are 15 feet (4.6 m) deep. Externally, it is clad with "red brick in English bond with some stone dressings". The roof is flat with a cross in the centre. It is supported by concrete beams which are 15 inches (380 mm) deep, arranged to form a grid of squares with sides 10 feet (3.0 m) long. These are aligned with the diagonal square of the building, and the top 3 inches (76 mm) of the beams form part of the roof slab.

At the western end of the building is a single-storey rectangular porch or narthex. This houses the two entrance doors, and has three lancet windows on each side. The windows illuminate the baptistry to the south and the children's corner to the north. The points of the star that align with the cardinal points of the compass have large clerestory windows in both sides of the triangle. The window in the eastern point, behind the altar, is glazed with some 30,000 pieces of coloured glass, depicting a host of angels in red and blue. It was designed by Christopher Webb, and cost £350 when the building was constructed. One of the panels was fitted back-to-front when the window was restored in the 1960s. The window sills were repaired in 2000, which required the bottom row of panels to be removed. The fifth panel was returned to its correct orientation, but the first panel was re-fitted back to front. The interior of the building is "raw but spatially subtle". It has an "ingenious plan with lofty columns supporting [a] flat ribbed roof". The plans show the long-held tradition that Cachemaille-Day intended to place the altar in the centre of the building to be incorrect.

== Geography ==
Under the ancient parishes system, Northenden stretched to the west of the centre of population, covering the modern area of Northern Moor, and to the south, covering Sharston, Benchill, Wythenshawe and Woodhouse Park. In 1866, it became a civil parish with an elected parish council. The southern part became the separate civil parish of Northen Etchells or Northenden Etchells, as it had its own parish council. The parish included the hamlets of Lawton Moor, Northen Moor, Rose Hill, and part of Wythenshawe. The civil parishes were abolished in 1931 when the area was transferred from Cheshire to Manchester. St Michael and All Angels was built on Orton Road, which was part of the ecclesiastical parish of Northenden, but since the development of the Wythenshawe garden suburb, is located in the area of Northern Moor. The church describes iself as St Michael and All Angels, Lawton Moor, but gives its postal address as Orton Road, Northern Moor.

== See also ==
- Grade II* listed buildings in Greater Manchester
- Listed buildings in Manchester-M23
