= Robert Tatton =

High Sheriff of Chester

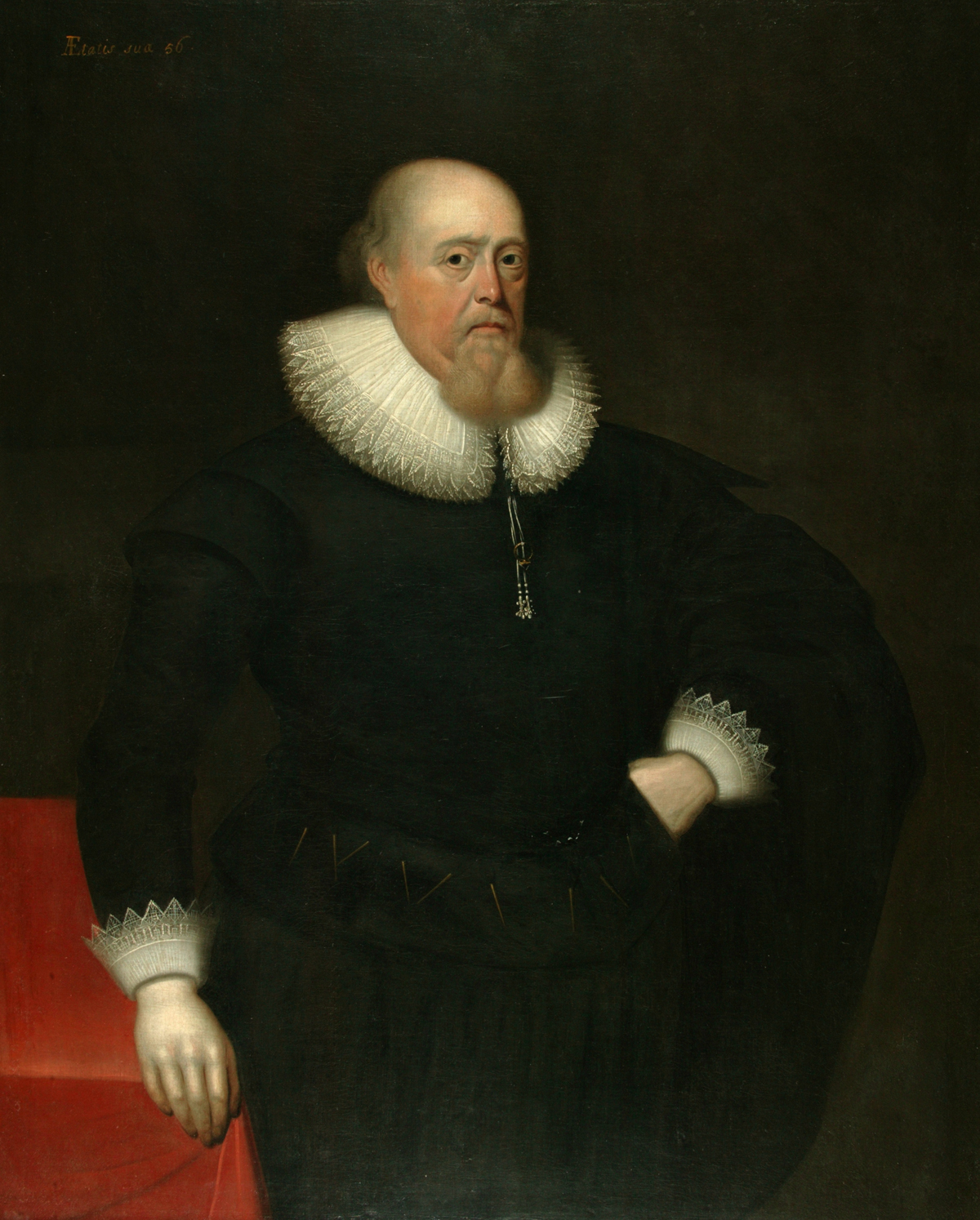
Robert Tatton more than a decade before the siege of Wythenshawe Hall

Robert Tatton (1606 – 19 August 1669) was the High Sheriff of Chester between 1645 and 1646. A supporter of King Charles I in the English Civil War, Robert is perhaps best known for the ultimately unsuccessful defence of his family home, Wythenshawe Hall, during its three-month siege by a Parliamentary force in the winter of 1643/44.

Robert was fined heavily by Parliament for fighting on the side of the king, but he was subsequently rewarded for his loyalty by Charles II following the restoration of the monarchy in 1660. He and his wife Anne had six children the eldest of whom, William, inherited Robert's Wythenshawe estate after his father's death in 1669.

== Early life ==
Robert's father, William Tatton, drowned in the River Mersey when Robert was 10 years old. As the only male heir Robert inherited his father's estate in Wythenshawe, but as a minor he was made a ward of the king, Charles I, until he came of age. On 9 January 1628, Robert married Anne Brereton, the third daughter of William Brereton of Ashley. The couple went on to have four sons and two daughters.

Robert's father-in-law William Brereton was a close relative of his namesake Sir William Brereton, who the year after Robert's marriage was appointed Commander-in-Chief of the Parliamentary troops in Cheshire following the outbreak of the English Civil War. The first pitched battle of the war was fought at Edgehill on 23 October 1642, and Robert decided to join the Royalist side.

== Siege of Wythenshawe Hall ==
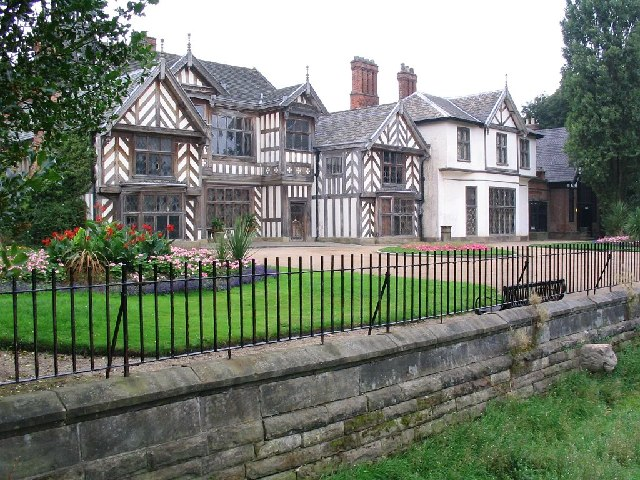
After its confiscation by Parliamentarians in 1644, Wythenshawe Hall was returned to Robert Tatton in 1646.

Towards the end of 1643 the commander of the local Parliamentary forces in Cheshire, Colonel Robert Duckenfield, was ordered to seize Wythenshawe Hall and to remove anything of value that could be found. Forewarned, Robert Tatton recruited a group of more than 50 defenders from among his staff and Royalist friends. After ransacking the nearby village of Northenden the Roundheads arrived at Wythenshawe Hall on 21 November 1643, but they did not find the task of taking it as easy as they had imagined. At one point during the siege the attackers almost took possession of the house in a struggle during which six of the defenders were killed. The Parliamentarians refused a truce to allow the bodies to be taken to the local church for proper services to be held, necessitating their burial in the garden behind the house. (Note: Writing in 1852 Sir Bernard Burke reported that six skeletons had been discovered in the garden during the previous century, perhaps belonging to the six killed in the defence of Wythenshawe Hall.) One of those killed was the fiancé of Mary Webb, a young woman who had been brought up by the Tattons and had remained in the house with the defenders. Towards the end of the siege Mary saw the man who had led the attack, Duckinfield's second-in-command Captain Adams, sitting on a wall near the house. Borrowing a musket from one of the defenders, she shot him dead.

The siege ended on 27 February 1644 after the Parliamentarians brought two cannons from nearby Manchester, with which they "reduced" the hall. By then the defenders had exhausted their ammunition and had very little food left. The hall was confiscated; an inventory taken after the surrender valued its contents at almost £1650, equivalent to about £350,000 as of 2023. (Note: UK Retail Price Index inflation figures are based on data from Clark, Gregory (2017). "The Annual RPI and Average Earnings for Britain, 1209 to Present (New Series)". MeasuringWorth.)

== Later life ==
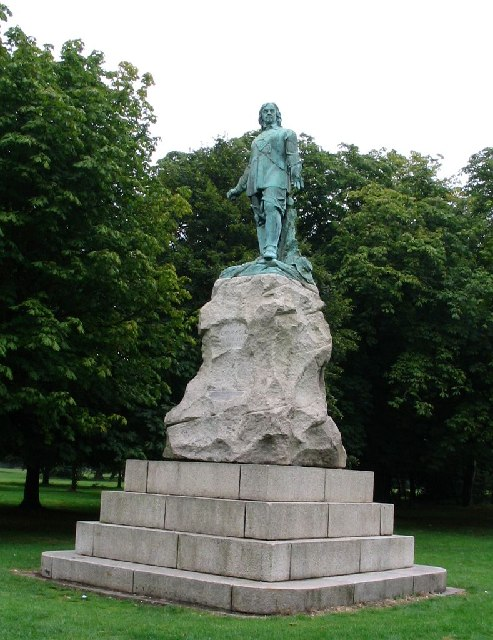
Statue of Oliver Cromwell, facing Wythenshawe Hall

Robert escaped and made his way to Chester, where in 1645 he was made High Sheriff of the county of Cheshire but he was forced to flee from the city early the following year when it too was besieged by Parliamentary forces. This time he made for Oxford, where King Charles I was in residence, but it fell only a few months later on 24 June 1646, effectively ending the war.

In the aftermath of the conflict Wythenshawe was included in a list of estates owned by Royalists that were to be forfeited to the new government. Robert's entry is as follows:

His [Robert's] Delinquencie, that hee deserted his owne Dwellinge, and went and lived in Oxford whiles it was a Garrison holden for the Kinge againste the Parliament, and was there at the tyme of the surrender ... Hee hath neither taken the Negative Oath nor Covenante, but prayes to be exempt upon the articles of Oxford and the Vote of the House of Commons pursuante.

Parliament allowed Robert to keep his estate on payment of a fine of £804 10s, reduced to £707 13s 4d in December 1646, and Wythenshawe Hall was returned to him two years after its confiscation. Following the restoration of the monarchy in 1660 King Charles II rewarded Robert's loyalty to the Crown by presenting him with a silver snuff box.

Robert Tatton died on 19 August 1669 and was buried at St Wilfrid's parish church in Northenden, which contains a wall monument in his memory. His eldest son William (born 1636) inherited the Wythenshawe estate.
