= Church of St Wilfrid, Northenden =

Church of St Wilfred, Northenden
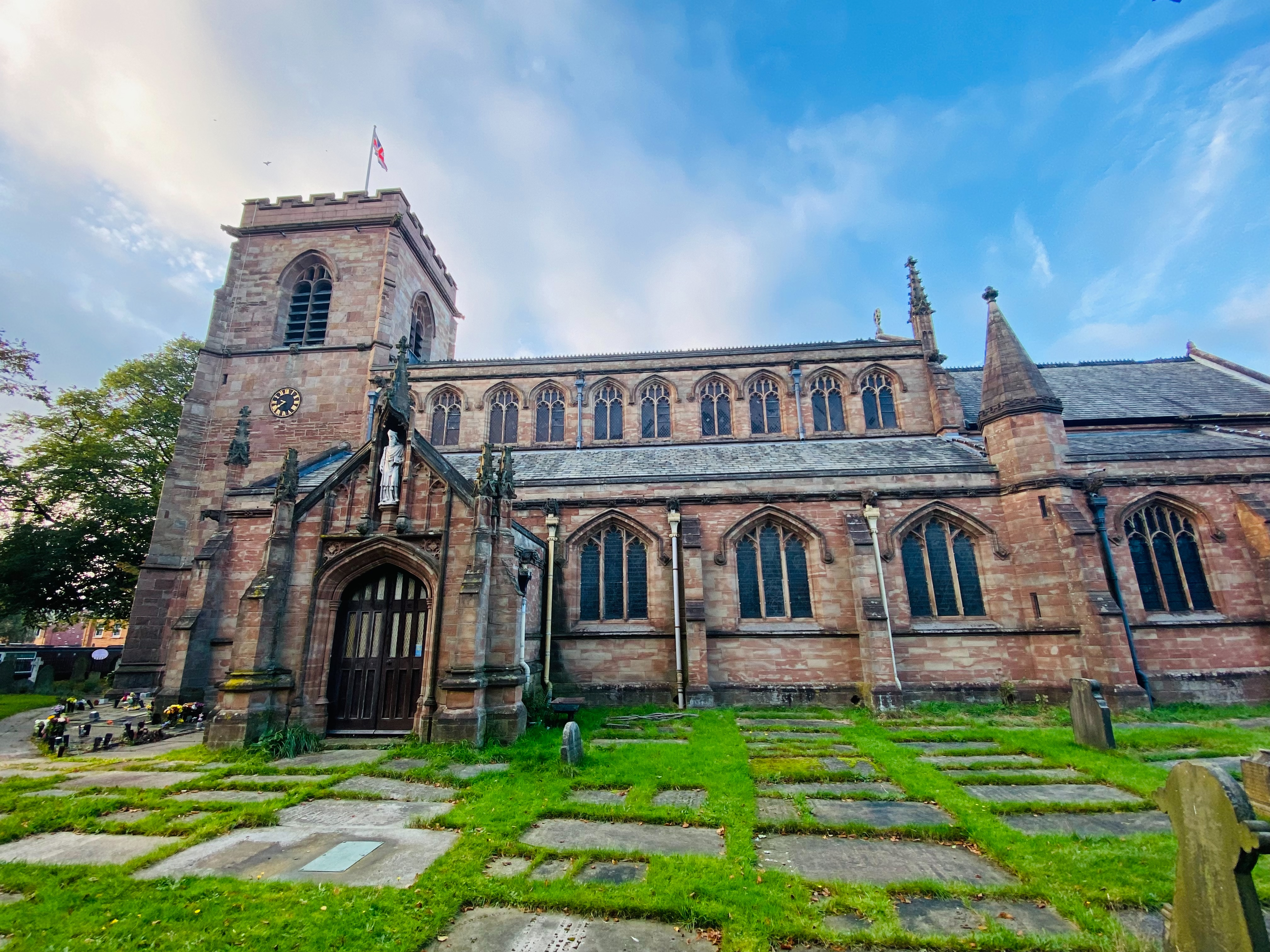
- Church of St Wilfrid

- Location in Manchester
- 53.4071°N 2.2535°W
- OS grid reference: SJ 83241 90062
- Location: Northenden, Greater Manchester
- Country: England
- Denomination: Church of England
- Churchmanship: Central
- Website: stwilfridsnorthenden.org.uk

History
- Status: Parish church
- Dedication: St Wilfred

Architecture
- Functional status: Active
- Heritage designation: Grade II*
- Architectural type: Parish church

The Church of St Wilfrid is an Anglican church in the suburb of Northenden in Manchester, England. It stands on Ford Lane, close to the River Mersey, approximately 5 miles (8 km) south of Manchester city centre.

The church is late medieval in origin and was substantially re-built in the 19th century by the Gothic Revival architect J. S. Crowther. The church was designated a Grade II* listed building on 25 February 1952.

== History ==
The origin of St Wilfrid's is possibly Saxon, with a mention in the Domesday Book of a "church (at) Norwardine: (held by) Ranulf and Bigot from Earl Hugh." The present church building dates from the 15th century, but was substantially altered in the 1870s. In 1872, the architect J. S. Crowther was commissioned to undertake repairs, but found that the medieval church was substantially without foundations. He therefore undertook a complete rebuilding programme.

== Architecture ==
The church is built on a cruciform floorplan of red Alderley Edge sandstone with slate roofs. The core of St Wilfrid's church building is 15th century in origin. Crowther's rebuilding work 1873-76 replaced much of the medieval fabric in the main church building. Crowther's work includes much Gothic ornamentation including carved grotesques and crocketed pinnacles. Crowther also added a pair of octagonal stair turrets. Crowther planned to rebuild the bell tower but this scheme was not realised, and today the tower is the only remaining medieval part of the building, designed in the Perpendicular Gothic style.

The interior contains some original medieval rood screens, including one above the doorway in the south chapel which depicts "a pair of tumblers and a monkey sitting on a drum. The tumblers can be read in two ways, so that they really do seem to tumble."

Adjoining the nave is the Wythenshawe Chapel, containing the burials of the Tatton family of nearby Wythenshawe Hall. There is a good selection of funerary monuments "to members of the Tatton and Egerton families including: Robert Tatton (d.1689), aedicule with putti; Mrs Egerton (d.1784), urn with carved flower garland; William Egerton (d.1806), woman lying on sarcophagus; and to Thomas Worthington (d.1856), mourning woman with 3 sarcophagi under weeping willow."

There is a complete set of Victorian stained glass dating from the 1850s which was saved from the old church and reinstalled following Crowther's rebuilding. The glass is thought to have been donated either by the Tatton family, or the Watkin family of Rose Hill, Northenden. The windows are the work of noted stained glass designers Charles Eamer Kempe, William Wailes and Henry Hughes. The church also contains windows by Percy Bacon Brothers and Humphries, Jackson and Ambler.

== Graveyard ==
In the large graveyard is the tomb of Sir Edward Watkin, Victorian railway magnate, as well as those of many of the Tatton family. The churchyard also contains war graves of eight service personnel of World War I and three from World War II.

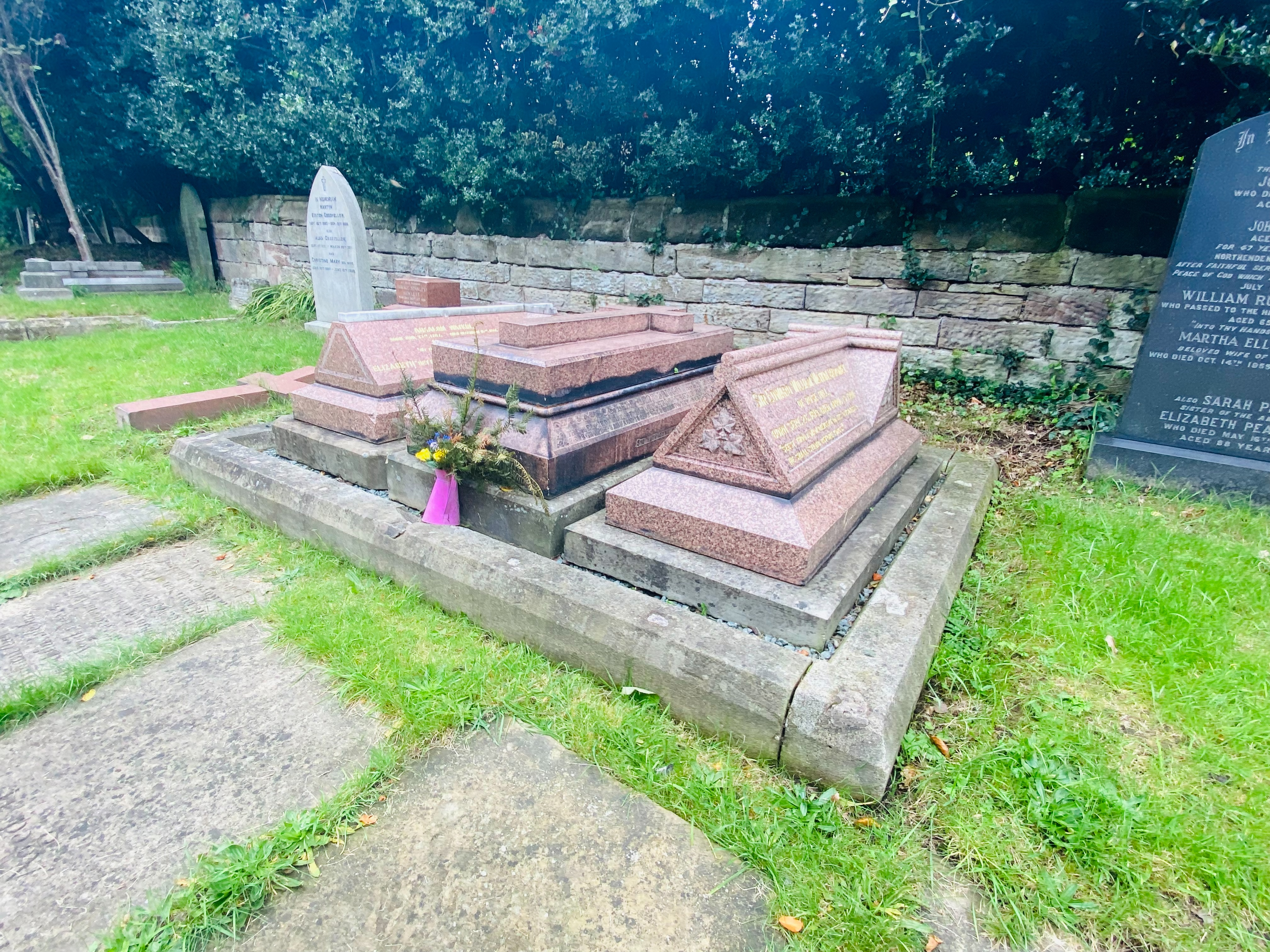
The Watkin Family graves, including the burials of Absalom Watkin and Edward Watkin

== See also ==
- Grade II* listed buildings in Greater Manchester
- Listed buildings in Manchester-M22

== Sources ==
- Hartwell, Clare; Hyde, Matthew; Pevsner, Nikolaus (2004), Lancashire: Manchester and the South East, The Buildings of England, New Haven, CT; London: Yale University Press, ISBN 0-300-10583-5
