= Listed buildings in Manchester-M22 =

Manchester is a city in Northwest England. The M22 postcode area of the city includes parts of the suburbs of Northenden and Wythenshawe. This postcode area contains 15 listed buildings that are recorded in the National Heritage List for England. Of these, three are listed at Grade II*, the middle of the three grades, and the others are at Grade II, the lowest grade. The area is largely residential and most of the listed buildings are houses and churches and associated structures. The other listed buildings include a bridge, a war memorial, and a former bus depot.

== Key ==
Grade	Criteria
II*	Particularly important buildings of more than special interest
II	Buildings of national importance and special interest

== Buildings ==
Name and location	Photograph	Date	Notes	Grade
St Wilfrid's Church, Northenden; 53.40715°N 2.25347°W		15th century	The oldest part of the church is the tower, the rest of the church having been rebuilt in 1873–76 by J. S. Crowther. The new part of the church is built in sandstone from Alderley Edge, with slate roofs, and is in Perpendicular style. The church consists of a nave with a clerestory, north and south aisles, a south porch, a chancel with north and south chapels, and a west tower. The tower has diagonal buttresses, an arched west doorway with a moulded surround, string courses, a clock face, and an embattled parapet. On the nave are corner crocketed pinnacles, and above the doorway in the porch is a niche containing a statue.	II*
Bridge over moat, former Peel Hall; 53.37784°N 2.24587°W	—	17th century (probable)	The bridge carries a roadway over the moat formerly surrounding Peel Hall, now demolished. It is in sandstone, and consists of three segmental arches with recessed voussoirs. There are two triangular cutwaters on each side that rise to form refuges.	II
Churchyard wall and gateway, St Wilfrid's Church; 53.40709°N 2.25405°W	—	18th century (probable)	The wall encloses the north, west and east sides of the churchyard, and consists of sandstone blocks. The gateway on the west side has square gate piers with banded rustication and moulded caps, and between them is an ogee-shaped wrought iron overthrow with a square lamp holder.	II
Sundial; 53.40697°N 2.25365°W	—	18th century (probable)	The sundial is in the churchyard of St Wilfrid's Church. It is in sandstone, and has a circular base, a vase pedestal with spiral gadrooning, a decorated top, and a moulded rim. The plate and the gnomon are missing. The sundial is surrounded by tall iron railings.	II
The Old Rectory; 53.40752°N 2.25206°W	—	Mid to late 18th century	A rectory, later a private house, extended in the late 19th century. It is in brown brick with quoins and a slate roof, a double-depth plan, and an added cross-wing to the south. The earlier part has three storeys and three bays, and a five-sided added bay. The later wing is at the same height with two storeys, and has a flat-roofed porch that has a round-headed doorway with a Roman Doric doorcase, and a fanlight. The windows in both parts are sashes.	II
Cottage, Northen House; 53.40734°N 2.25391°W	—	Late 18th century	A brick cottage with a wooden eaves cornice and a slate roof, a double-depth plan, two low storeys and a cellar, two bays, and a rear extension. The main doorway has a square head and a canopy with a pitched roof, and there is a smaller door to the right. The ground floor windows have segmental heads, and on the upper floor are two casement window.	II
Northen House; 53.40737°N 2.25377°W	—	Late 18th or early 19th century	A house in red and grey brick, the right gable end rendered, with a modillioned eaves cornice and a slate roof. There are two storeys, a double-depth plan, and four bays. The round-headed doorway has a Roman Doric doorcase with a pediment and a fanlight. The windows are replaced top-hung casements.	II
Sharston Mount; 53.39291°N 2.24981°W	—	c. 1800	A farmhouse, later a private house, incorporating some earlier material. It is in stuccoed brick with a modillioned eaves cornice, a slate roof, and a double-depth plan. There are two storeys and a cellar, a symmetrical front of three bays, and rear extensions. The central doorway has an Ionic porch, flanked by canted bay windows. There is a small-paned casement window in the left gable, and the other windows are sashes.	II
Rose Hill; 53.40166°N 2.24875°W		Mid-19th century	A country house later divided into flats, it is in brick, mostly rendered, with an ashlar stone extension, and a Welsh slate roof. The house has a courtyard plan, two storeys, and a single-storey extension. The extension has six bays, a central doorway with Tuscan columns, a fanlight and a broken pediment. To the left are mullioned and transomed windows, to the right is a three-light sash window, and above is an embattled parapet. In the main block are bay windows, some canted, some round, and elsewhere are mullioned and transomed windows and sash windows.	II*
Northenden War Memorial; 53.40716°N 2.25978°W	—	1922	The war memorial stands in a small garden and is in York stone. It has a base of two steps, a square plinth, and a rectangular pillar about 5 metres (16 ft) tall with a wheel-head cross. On the front of the cross head is a reversed sword carved in relief. On the plinth are bronze plaques with inscriptions and the names of those lost in both World Wars.	II
Assembly Hall of Jehovah's Witnesses; 53.40690°N 2.26391°W		1935	Originally a cinema, the hall is in Moderne style, built on a steel frame with walls of dark brown brick, a faience feature at the front and a fly tower at the rear. The front is symmetrical, the central faience feature being recessed and stepped up in the middle. It contains a set of doors, above which is a canopy with chamfered corners, and over this are five tall windows, the central three with canted heads. The central feature is flanked by strips of faience, and there are more strips of faience along the sides.	II
Church of St Luke the Physician; 53.38950°N 2.25562°W		1938–39	The church is built in light brown brick, and consists of a nave, north and south flat-roofed aisles with porches and offices, a short tower, and a west tower. The tower is as wide as the nave, on the west front is a clock face with a mosaic floral surround, and it is surmounted by a recessed bell stage with a hipped roof. Along the sides are flat-topped lancet windows.	II
Wythenshawe Bus Depot; 53.40096°N 2.25655°W		1939–1942	Built as a bus garage, later used for aircraft production, and later for warehousing, it is in reinforced concrete with shell concrete barrel vaults. It consists of a long garage, with a repair hall and washing bays at the rear in rendered brick. It is one of the first reinforced concrete shell roof structures to be built in England.	II*
St Anthony's Church, Woodhouse; 53.37347°N 2.26020°W		1959–60	A Roman Catholic church designed by Adrian Gilbert Scott. It is built in light buff brick with dressings in Portland stone and has a tiled roof. The church has a cruciform plan, consisting of a nave, processional aisles, transepts, a polygonal apse, and a tower at the crossing. The tower is octagonal, and has a parapet and a polygonal copper-clad roof with a finial. At the liturgical west end is a parabolic arch containing a recessed doorway, and the sides of the arch rise to form pinnacles with copper-clad spirelets.	II
William Temple Memorial Church; 53.37768°N 2.26409°W		1963–1965	The church was designed by George Pace. It has a steel frame, walls of blue, red and brown brick, and a copper roof. The church has a rectangular plan and is organised on the diagonal with a sanctuary in one corner and a chapel in the other. The gables are long and tall and contain strip windows. On the roof are dormers and a slim tower with a mono-pitched roof.	II
