= Listed buildings in Manchester-M23 =

Manchester is a city in Northwest England. The M23 postcode area of the city includes parts of the suburbs of Wythenshawe and Northenden. The postcode area contains 11 listed buildings that are recorded in the National Heritage List for England. Of these, one is listed at Grade I, the highest of the three grades, two are at Grade II*, the middle grade, and the others are at Grade II, the lowest grade. The area is almost completely residential, and the listed buildings include two former manor houses and associated structures, a former farm and outbuildings, a house, a church, and a vicarage.

== Key ==
| Grade | Criteria |
|---|---|
| I | Buildings of exceptional interest, sometimes considered to be internationally important |
| II* | Particularly important buildings of more than special interest |
| II | Buildings of national importance and special interest |

== Buildings ==
| Name and location | Photograph | Date | Notes | Grade |
|---|---|---|---|---|
| Baguley Hall; 53.39522°N 2.27785°W | | c. 1325–1350 | A manor house with an H-shaped plan. The oldest part is the central hall, which is timber framed on a sandstone plinth. The north service wing was added probably in the early 15th century; it was originally timber framed, and was encased in brick in the 17th century. The timber framed porch dates from the 16th century, and the south family wing, which is in brick, was added in the late 17th or early 18th century. The hall has 2½ bays and is open to the roof, and the wings have three bays each and 2½ storeys. The porch in the northwest angle has two storeys, the upper storey jettied, and contains a square-headed doorway and a mullioned window. Elsewhere the windows vary; there are more mullioned windows, others are casement windows with transoms, and there are also restored sash windows and a stair window. | I |
| Wythenshawe Hall; 53.40488°N 2.27814°W | | 16th century | A manor house, later altered and extended, particularly in the 19th century. The original part is timber framed with a green slate roof and a U-shaped plan, consisting of a central hall, projecting wings, a gabled porch in the right angle and an oriel window in the left angle. There are two storeys, and the hall has three bays, the upper storeys and gables jettied. On the front are bressumers, carved pendants, bargeboards, and apex finials. The porch has a Tudor arched doorway with a carved lintel, and the windows on the front are mullioned and transomed. The 19th-century extensions are in brick, partly stuccoed, and at the rear are sash windows. (Note: The original part of the hall was severely damaged by fire in 2016, and work has been undertaken to restore it.) | II* |
| Newall Green Farmhouse; 53.38191°N 2.29066°W | — | 1594 | A former farmhouse in red brick with sandstone quoins and a slate roof. It has two storeys and is symmetrical with an E-shaped plan, consisting of a main range, projecting wings and a central porch. The porch has two storeys, an arched doorway with a chamfered surround, a dated lintel, and a shaped gable. The windows are top-hung casements, and in each gable is an oculus. | II |
| Former stable block, Wythenshawe Hall; 53.40478°N 2.27921°W | — | 18th century | The stable block, later used for other purposes, is in red brick with a slate roof. It consists of two ranges enclosing the east and north sides of a courtyard, with two storeys. In the east range is a central clock and bell turret, on the ground floor are semicircular windows, and the upper floor contains circular windows. The windows on the north range have been altered. | II |
| Outbuildings north of Newall Green Farmhouse; 53.38225°N 2.29032°W | — | 18th century | The former farm outbuildings are in brick with slate roofs. They form an L-shaped plan with two ranges at right angles, and have two storeys. The buildings contain segmental-headed doorways and windows, first-floor loading doors, and vents arranged in diamond patterns. | II |
| Outbuilding northwest of Newall Green Farmhouse; 53.38209°N 2.29078°W | — | Mid-18th century (probable) | The former farm outbuilding is in brick with a slate roof. It has a rectangular plan, two storeys and four bays. The building contains segmental-headed windows and a doorway, a blocked segmental-headed wagon entrance, and first-floor loading doors. There is a lead-to extension on the right. | II |
| The Mount; 53.40753°N 2.27602°W | — | Early 19th century | A house, later divided into flats, in red brick. It has two storeys, two parallel ranges, the rear range offset to the left, and three bays. On the front are sash windows, and there is a porch in the right gable wall. At the rear is a lean-to in the angle with a segmental-headed door, and the windows are top-hung casements imitating sashes, with segmental heads. | II |
| Oliver Cromwell statue 53.40479°N 2.27684°W | | 1875 | The statue of Oliver Cromwell stands in Wythenshawe Park, it is by Matthew Noble, and was moved here in 1968 from its previous position in Manchester city centre. The statue is in bronze and depicts Cromwell standing. The base is in grey granite and consists of a square plinth of four steps, and a roughly-hewn pedestal with two inscribed panels. | II |
| North Lodge, Wythenshawe Hall; 53.40703°N 2.27516°W | | 1878 | The lodge is built in brick with applied timber framing and a slate roof. It is in Tudor style, with one storey and a T-shaped plan. It contains canted bay windows, and gables with wavy bargeboards and apex finials. The windows have ogee-headed leaded lights. | II |
| Church of St Michael and All Angels, Northenden; 53.40946°N 2.28235°W | | 1936–37 | The church, designed by Cachemaille-Day and Lander, is in red brick with some stone dressings. It has a star-shaped plan with two intersecting squares of unequal size, and a rectangular west narthex. The lower part is plain with a sill band and a parapet. In the upper part are windows in intersecting Romanesque arcading with Y-tracery, and in the centre of each arcade is a pilaster strip rising to a moulded cornice. On the roof is a plain cross. The narthex contains doorway and lancet windows. | II* |
| Vicarage, Church of St Michael and All Angels, Northenden; 53.40936°N 2.28247°W | — | 1937 | The vicarage to the south of the church, by Cachemaille-Day, is in red brick with concrete dressings and flat roofs of concrete slabs. The main range is symmetrical with two storeys, three bays, a central recessed doorway, and a parapet. To the left is a lower two-storey five-bay link to the church, that has a flat-roofed porch in the angle with the church, and a plain doorway. To the right of the main range is a single-storey garage. | II |

== Notes and references ==
=== Sources ===
- Butler, Katie (31 March 2017). "Work to restore Wythenshawe Hall begins one year on from devastating blaze". Manchester Evening News.
- Historic England, "Baguley Hall, Manchester (1291962)", National Heritage List for England
- Historic England, "Wythenshawe Hall, Manchester (1255034)", National Heritage List for England
- Historic England, "Newall Green Farmhouse, Manchester (1197897)", National Heritage List for England
- Historic England, "Outbuildings to north of Newall Green Farmhouse, Manchester (1220351)", National Heritage List for England
- Historic England, "Outbuilding approximately 15 metes north-west of Newall Green Farmhouse, Manchester (1291017)", National Heritage List for England
- Historic England, "Former stable block to west of Wythenshawe Hall, Manchester (1255038)", National Heritage List for England
- Historic England, "The Mount, Manchester (1255037)", National Heritage List for England
- Historic England, "Park Statue of Oliver Cromwell approximately 100 metres east of Wythenshawe Hall, Manchester (1255035)", National Heritage List for England
- Historic England, "North Lodge of Wythenshawe Hall, Manchester (1255036)", National Heritage List for England
- Historic England, "Church of St Michael and All Angels, Manchester (1271360)", National Heritage List for England
- Historic England, "Vicarage of Church of St Michael and All Angels, Manchester (1246281)", National Heritage List for England
- Historic England, Listed Buildings
- Hartwell, Clare; Hyde, Matthew; Pevsner, Nikolaus (2004), Lancashire: Manchester and the South-East, The Buildings of England, New Haven and London: Yale University Press, ISBN 0-300-10583-5
