= Sir Alfred Watkin, 2nd Baronet =

Alfred Watkin Bt MP
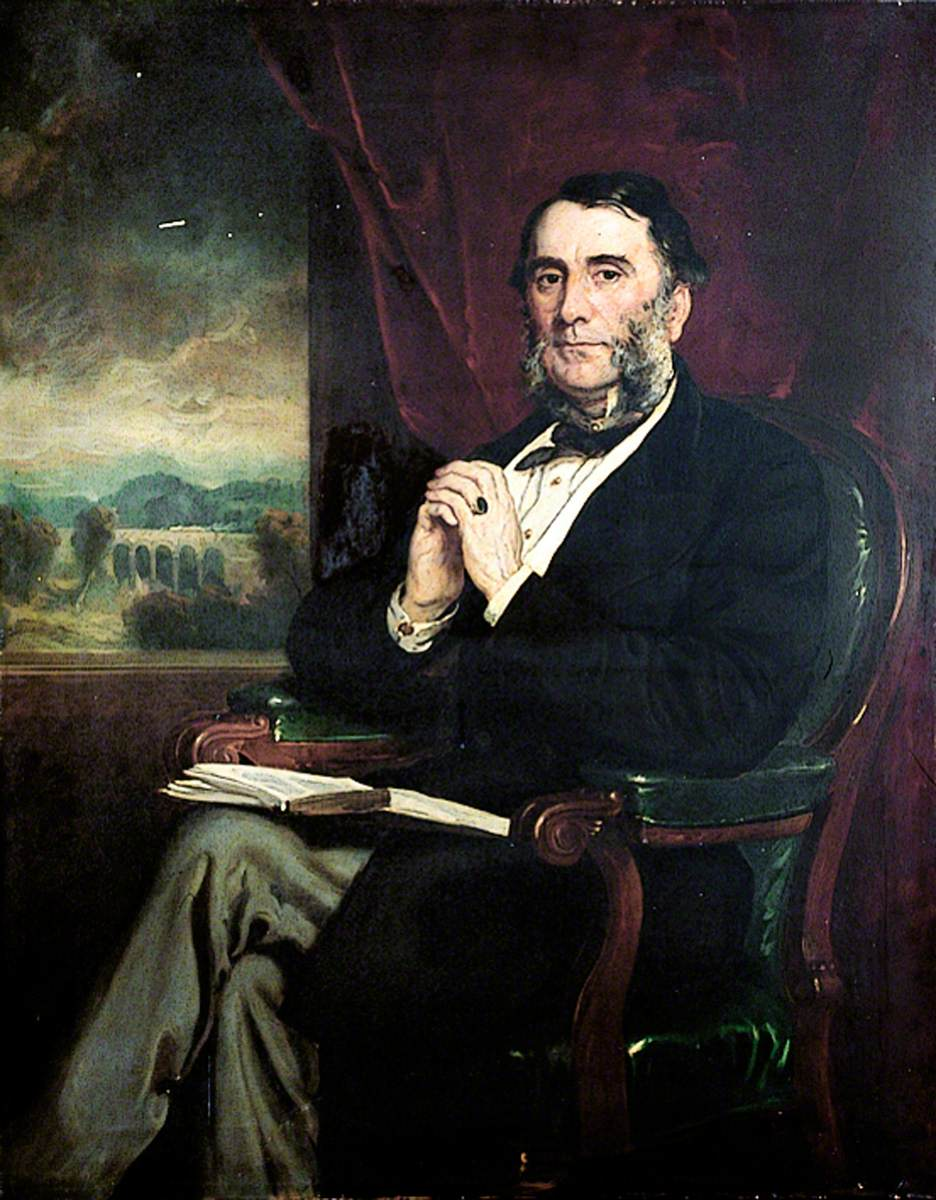
- Sir Alfred Watkin

Member of Parliament for Great Grimsby
- In office 1877–1880
- Preceded by: John Chapman
- Succeeded by: Edward Heneage

Personal details
- Born: 11 August 1846 Manchester, United Kingdom
- Died: 30 November 1914 (aged 68) Folkestone, Kent, United Kingdom
- Party: Liberal
- Spouse: Catherine Elizabeth Smith (m. 1876)
- Parent(s): Sir Edward Watkin, Bt; Mary Briggs Mellor

Sir Alfred Mellor Watkin, 2nd Baronet (11 August 1846 – 30 November 1914) was a Liberal Party politician and railway engineer.

== Railway career ==
In 1863, around age 17, Watkin became an apprentice in the locomotive department of the West Midland Railway before being transferred the next year to the Manchester, Sheffield and Lincolnshire Railway where he qualified as an express engine driver. In 1866, he then became a locomotive inspector of the London, Chatham and Dover Railway, and the South Eastern Railway. He became a locomotive inspector of the latter in 1873, director in 1878, and chairman of its locomotive committee of directors from 1880 to 1900.

== Parliamentary career ==
He was elected Liberal MP for Great Grimsby at a by-election in 1877, gaining the seat from the Conservative Party. He did not attempt to retain the seat at the next election in 1880.

== Baronetage ==
He became the 2nd Baronet of Rose Hill upon his father Edward Watkin's death in 1901, and the title became extinct upon his own death in 1914.

== Other activities ==
During his life, Watkin was a Deputy Lieutenant of Middlesex, a Justice of the Peace, and a Chevalier of the Order of Leopold of Belgium.

Parliament of the United Kingdom
Preceded by John Chapman	Member of Parliament for Great Grimsby; 1877–1880	Succeeded by Edward Heneage
Baronetage of the United Kingdom
Preceded by Edward Watkin	Baronet (of Rose Hill); 1901–1914	Extinct
