= Robert Henry Grenville Tatton =

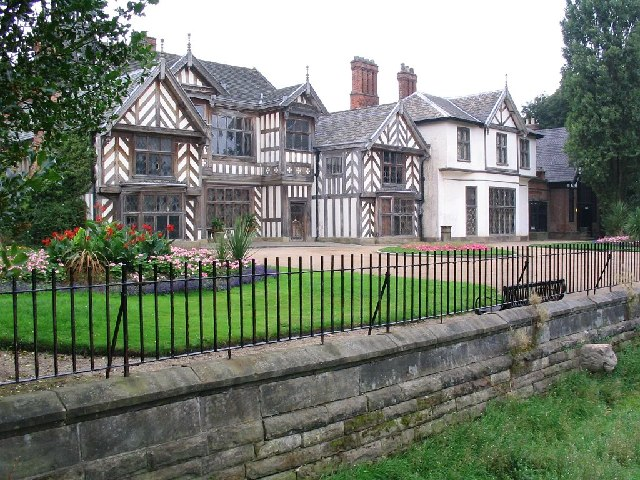
Wythenshawe Hall, ancestral home of the Tatton family

Robert Henry Grenville Tatton (2 March 1883 – 1 March 1962) was the High Sheriff of Chester from 1936 until 1937. He was the last member of his family to own Wythenshawe Hall and its estate, the ancestral home of the Tattons for 600 years, and the last male member of his line.

After selling his Wythenshawe estate to Manchester Corporation in 1926 Robert and his family moved first to Wybunbury in Cheshire and then to Kent, where Robert died the day before his 79th birthday.

== Early life ==
Robert was the only son of Thomas Egerton Tatton and his wife Essex Mary Cholmondeley. He had two older sisters: Alice (1877–1929) and Eva Beatrice (born 1879). After completing his education Robert enlisted in the Oxfordshire and Buckinghamshire Light Infantry and rose to the rank of captain. He married Maud née Hamilton on 11 November 1911 in a ceremony held at the church of St Peter's in the East, Oxford. The couple had four children: William Grey Maurice (born 1912), Betty Catherine (born 1914), Susan, and Christopher (born 1922).

== Sale of Wythenshawe ==
Robert's father died in 1924 leaving him the Wythenshawe estate, where Robert was already living with his wife and family. Manchester Corporation had been trying to buy the estate for some time, to develop much-needed housing for the city's rapidly expanding population, but Thomas had refused to sell. In 1926 Robert bowed to the inevitable and sold 2,500 acres (1,000 ha) of land to the corporation. He also sold Wythenshawe Hall and 250 acres (100 ha) of its surrounding parkland to Ernest Simon, who donated them to Manchester Corporation "to be used solely for the public good".

== Later life ==
After leaving Wythenshawe Hall Robert and his family moved to Wybunbury, in the south of Cheshire. Shortly after the family home had been sold, Robert's eldest son, William Grey, died at school at Eton, aged 14. The Tattons remained in Wybunbury until the end of the Second World War, during which conflict their remaining son, Christopher, was killed in action when the battleship on which he was serving, HMS Prince of Wales, was sunk by the Japanese in 1941. After the war the family moved to Kent, where Robert died on 1 March 1962, the last of the male line of his family.
