= Northenden =

Suburb in Manchester, England

Coordinates: 53°24′26″N 2°15′29″W

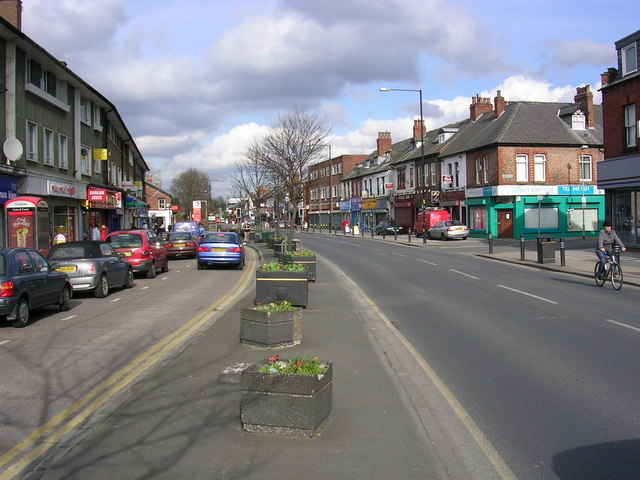
- Palatine Road, in central Northenden

- Location within Greater Manchester
- Population: 15,064
- OS grid reference: SJ828901
  - London: 159 mi (256 km) SE
- Metropolitan borough: Manchester
- Metropolitan county: Greater Manchester
- Region: North West
- Country: England
- Sovereign state: United Kingdom
- Post town: MANCHESTER
- Postcode district: M22
- Dialling code: 0161
- Police: Greater Manchester
- Fire: Greater Manchester
- Ambulance: North West
- UK Parliament: Wythenshawe and Sale East
- Councillors: Angela Moran (Labour); Richard Fletcher (Labour Co-op); Sam Lynch (Labour)

Northenden is a suburb of Manchester, in Greater Manchester, England. It had a population of 15,064 at the 2021 census. It lies on the south side of the river Mersey, 4 miles (6.4 km) west of Stockport and 5 miles (8.0 km) south of Manchester city centre, bounded by Didsbury to the north, Gatley to the east, Sale to the west and Wythenshawe to the south.

Historically a rural township and parish within the hundred of Bucklow in Cheshire, despite unplanned urbanisation and population growth in its neighbours in the 19th century, Northenden remained a comparatively rural and unpopulated area which spanned the hamlets of Lawton Moor, Northern Moor, Rose Hill and a part of what is now Wythenshawe. By 1866, Northenden had coalesced and became a civil parish. The industrialisation of neighbouring Manchester resulted in overpopulation in the early 20th century.

Manchester City Council used the Local Government Act 1929 to extend its boundaries to encompass Northenden in 1931 and, throughout the mid-20th century, it was redeveloped as an overspill estate.

== History ==
Northenden was mentioned as Norwordine in the Domesday Book of 1086; its name came from Anglo-Saxon Norþ-worþign, meaning "north enclosure". It was then a small farming community with a manor house and woodland. In later times, Northenden was sometimes called Northen.

There was a weir on the Mersey in the 14th century, where Mill Lane is now, and a mill was set up there to grind corn. It is recorded in the 16th century as belonging to the Tatton family of Wythenshawe Hall, who had the right to make all their tenants use the mill on payment of a fee. The weir and mill were demolished in the early 1960s.

As Northenden is on a major, and very old, crossing place of the Mersey on the salt road from Cheshire to Manchester, which prospered in medieval times. The ford was an important way in to and out of Manchester (now Ford Lane), as there was no bridge over the Mersey between Sale and Stockport. In 1745, Bonnie Prince Charlie's army built a troop-bridge out of big poplar tree trunks where the B5095 Manchester Road now crosses the Mersey, south of Didsbury, in his abortive attempt to seize the crown of England. The Northenden ford was unusual because its northern and southern ends were not opposite each other, but people using the ford had to wade about 500 feet (152 m) along the riverbed. The Simon's Bridge was built at the ford in 1901 to help access to Poor's Field; the rent from this field was used by the church to buy blankets and clothes for the needy.

Distance from Manchester enabled Northenden to avoid the Industrial Revolution in the 19th century; the nearest it came to industrialisation was a cottage industry in flax spinning. In the 1980s, the area became part of the Mersey Valley Park and the banks of the river form part of the Mersey Valley Trail.

The suburb began to develop as an attractive riverside township for Manchester's more affluent managers, clerks and tradesmen; the Victorian and Edwardian development gives the village much of its present character. In the wake of Manchester's acquisition of Wythenshawe for a new garden city, Northenden became a district of Manchester in 1931.

Northenden is often referred to as a village by local residents but, during the first half of the 20th century, it expanded with suburban housing at the same time as the Wythenshawe housing estate was built. Northenden, whose centre was formerly Church Road, rapidly developed a new shopping centre along Palatine Road (Note: A new road built to connect with Manchester.) to service the new neighbourhood with shops, schools, a cinema, (Note: The cinema was closed in 1974.) hotels, churches, small businesses and service industries.

== Governance ==
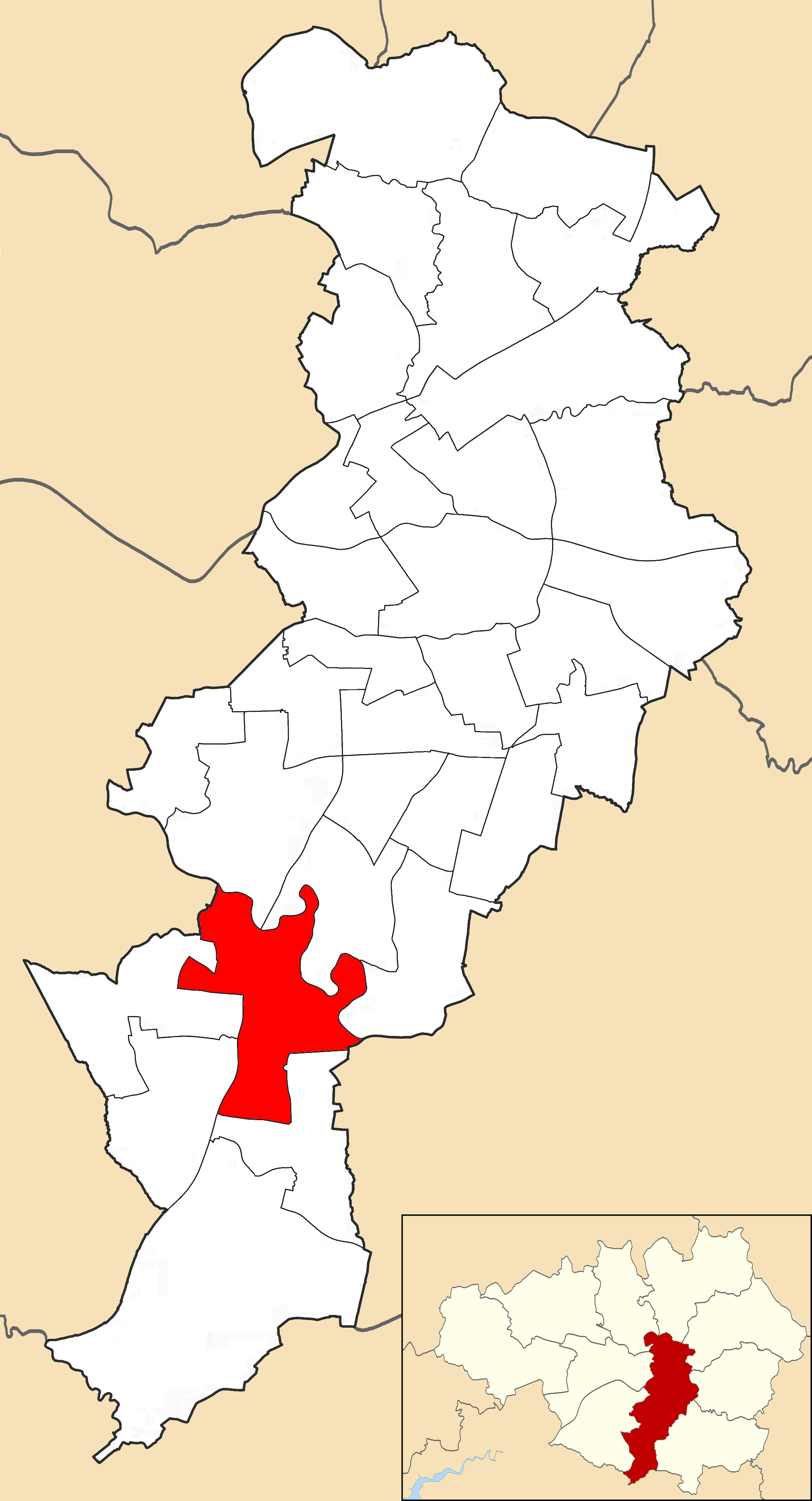
Northenden electoral ward

Northenden was one of the eight ancient parishes of the Macclesfield hundred of Cheshire and included the township of Northen Etchells. Under the Poor Law Amendment Act 1886, the parish was split in two and Northen Etchells became a civil parish in its own right. On 1 April 1931, both parishes were incorporated into Manchester and became part of the County Borough of Manchester, along with the civil parish of Baguley, which was part of the Bucklow hundred of Cheshire. In 1921, the parish had a population of 3,236.

Northenden is part of the Wythenshawe and Sale East parliamentary constituency, represented by the Labour Party MP Mike Kane.

Northenden is a ward within the local authority of Manchester City Council. The ward is represented by three Labour Party councillors: Richard Fletcher, Sam Lynch and Angela Moran.

Northenden is covered by the South Manchester division of Greater Manchester Police.

== Geography ==
Northenden is located at the southern end of the metropolitan borough of Manchester, 5.2 miles (8.4 km) from the city centre; it borders the south bank of the Mersey.

The suburb is one of the many areas within Wythenshawe. It has the same postal code, is part of the Parliamentary constituency and is one of the five electoral wards of the Wythenshawe area. In 2003, following a review by the Boundary Committee for England, the Wythenshawe ward of Benchill was disestablished after it was named the most deprived ward in England in the Index of Multiple Deprivation (Note: The index is a governmental measure of local employment, income, health, education, housing, child poverty and availability of local services.) The area was then divided between the neighbouring wards of Sharston, Woodhouse Park and Northenden.

However, in 2006, after Manchester City Council erected a road sign that said "Welcome to Northenden, Wythenshawe", many Northenden residents objected to the inclusion of the word "Wythenshawe". The residents were accused by one local councillor of snobbish behaviour and attempting to distance themselves from the Wythenshawe area, which is primarily social housing, for the sake of house prices and wanting to be seen more as an extension of the affluent neighbouring Didsbury area. The city council agreed to remove the word "Wythenshawe" from the sign, though Northenden is still officially part of the Wythenshawe area.

== Transport ==
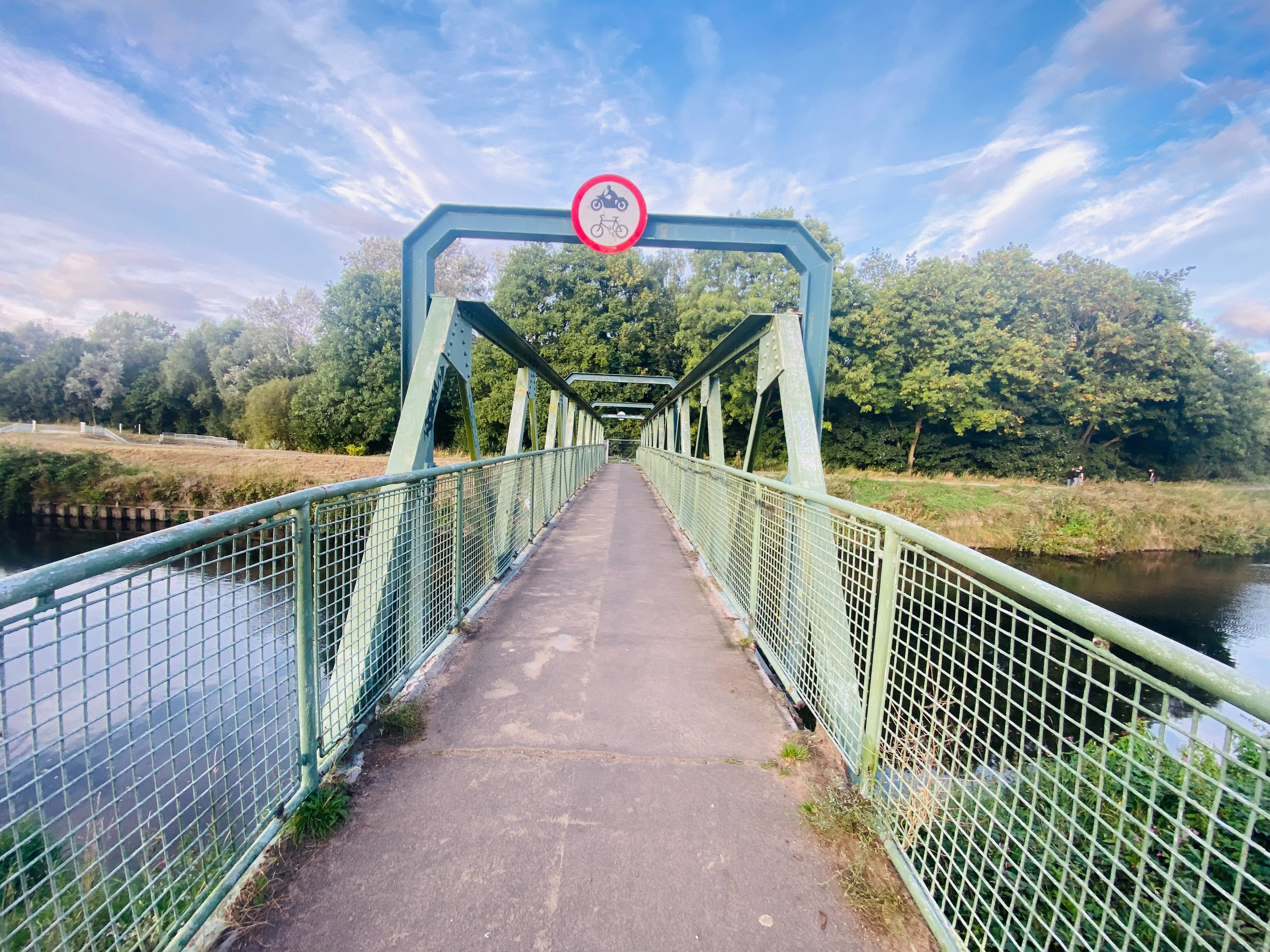
The Mersey footbridge

The suburb lies in a triangle formed by two motorways (the M56 and M60) and a dual carriageway (A5103 Princess Parkway).

The area is served by several bus routes, operated by Metroline Manchester and Stagecoach Manchester, under contract to the Bee Network. Destinations include Manchester Piccadilly Gardens, Altrincham, Didsbury, Sale and Stockport.

Manchester Airport lies approximately 4 miles (6.4 km) to the south.

A footbridge crosses the Mersey above the weir; it forms part of the Trans Pennine Trail walking and cycling route.

Northenden railway station was sited between Sharston Road and Longley Lane in Sharston; it served the area between 1866 and 1964. Passenger trains between Stockport Tiviot Dale, Warrington Central and Liverpool Central stopped here.

== Religion ==
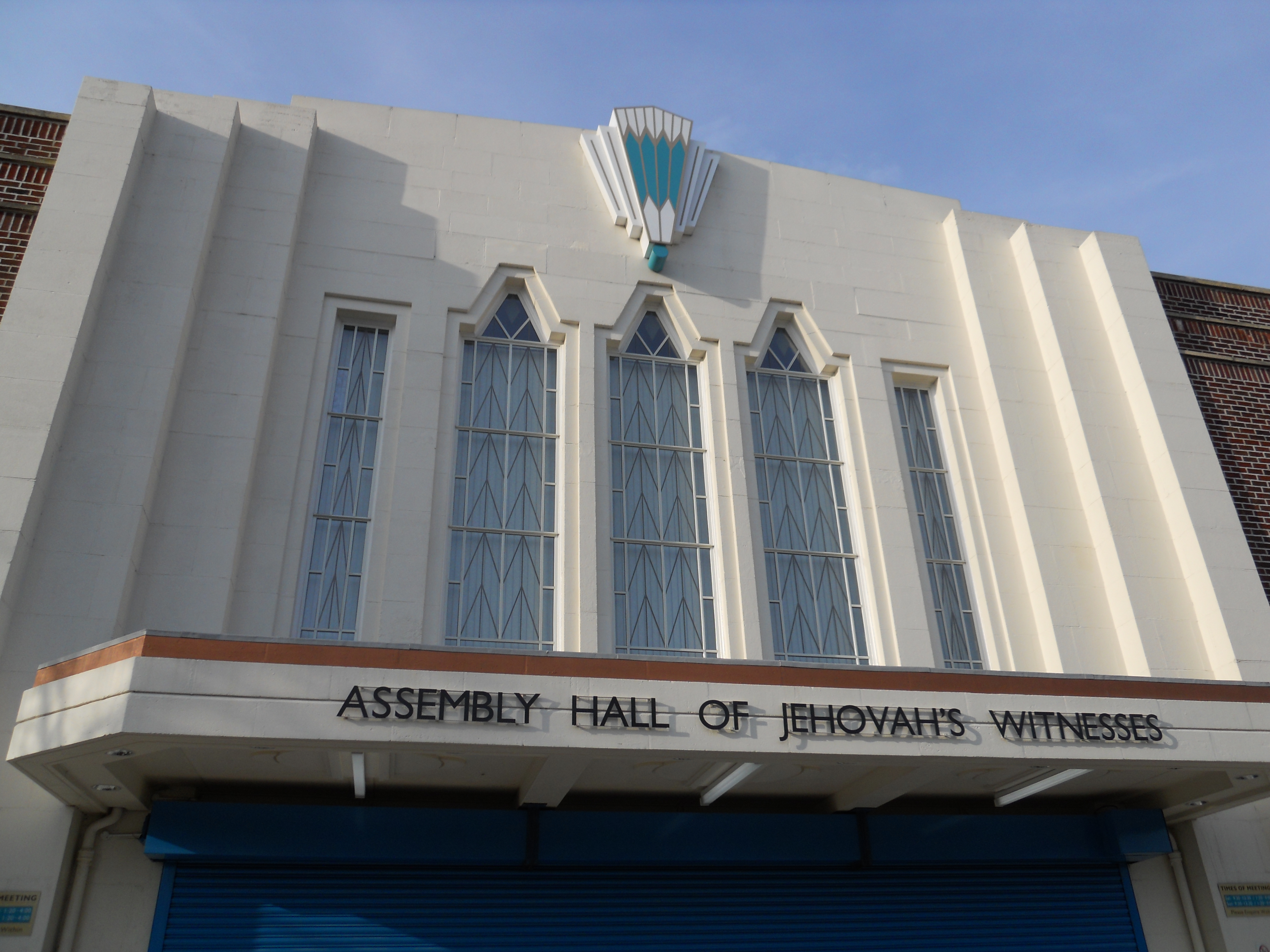
Kingdom Hall of the Jehovah's Witnesses

The Church of St Wilfrid is a Grade II* listed building. Most of the church's structure dates from the 19th century, apart from the tower which was built in the 15th century. The 19th-century remodelling was done in red sandstone and is an example of Perpendicular Gothic architecture. St Wilfrid's contains a memorial to 19th-century railway chairman Sir Edward Watkin, founder of the Channel Tunnel Company, who is buried in the church grounds.

The Church of St Michael and All Angels, designed by N.F. Cachemaille-Day (1935-7) is a Grade II* listed building.

Northenden has the largest Jehovah's Witness Kingdom Hall in the area. The hall is housed in the former Forum cinema on Palatine Road, which was built originally in 1934 to designs by Charles Hartley. The Grade II listed building is a noted example of Art Deco Moderne architecture, with an elaborately decorated foyer and auditorium, and its white faience facade is a striking local landmark.

The area also has places of worship for Methodists, Anglicans, Roman Catholics, Mormons and Quakers.

== Places of interest ==
Northenden Social Club's first premises was a converted First World War army hut, originally used by the medical officer at Heaton Park. Buying it cost £114 and the club had to raise another £412 for it to be transported to their site and established as a social club. In front of the club is the Northenden War Memorial, next to Palatine Road. It was a favourite Friday night haunt for Polish paratroopers and other allied soldiers; they largely trained during the Second World War at what was Ringway Airport. (Note: It was later to become Manchester Airport.) It has fairly extensive grounds for parking, bowls and tennis.

The Mersey passes through Northenden and one of its more popular parts is the weir, which now has a fish ladder enabling migrating salmon and sea trout to get upstream. The weir is flat with tiles and has only a thin sheet of water running down the weir as it is fairly wide. Fishing can be very good here as this stretch contains trout, roach, dace, eels, pike, salmon, (Note: Mid-autumn to mid-spring and this goes for sea trout.) chub, barbel and some grayling have been caught.

On the west bank of the Mersey stands the derelict Tatton Arms public house. Originally named the Boat House Inn, it was designed in 1874 by the architect James Redford and is a noted example of Tudor Revival architecture. The pub closed in 2007 and lies derelict; it is scheduled for redevelopment as housing.

== Notable people ==
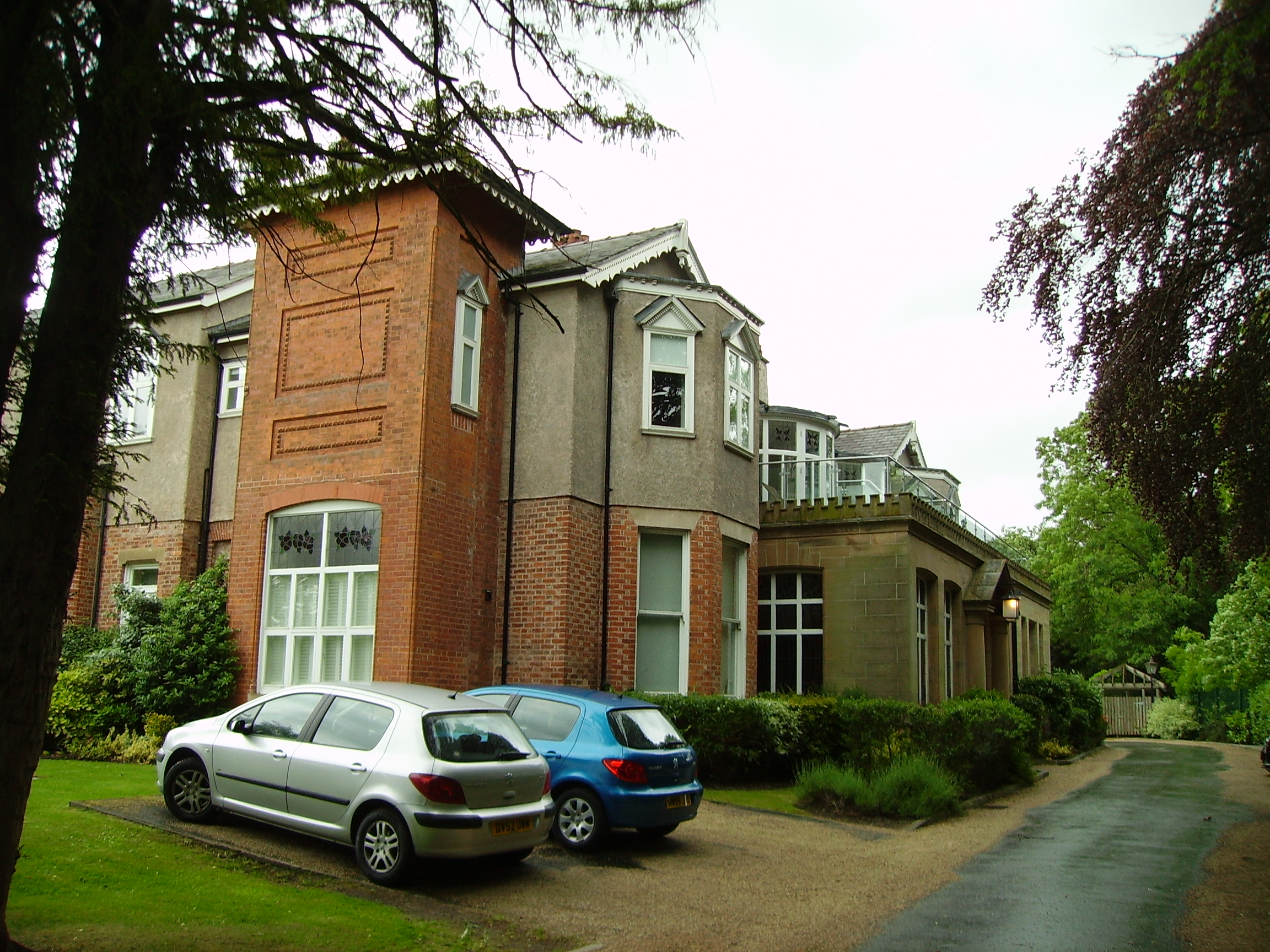
Rose Hill

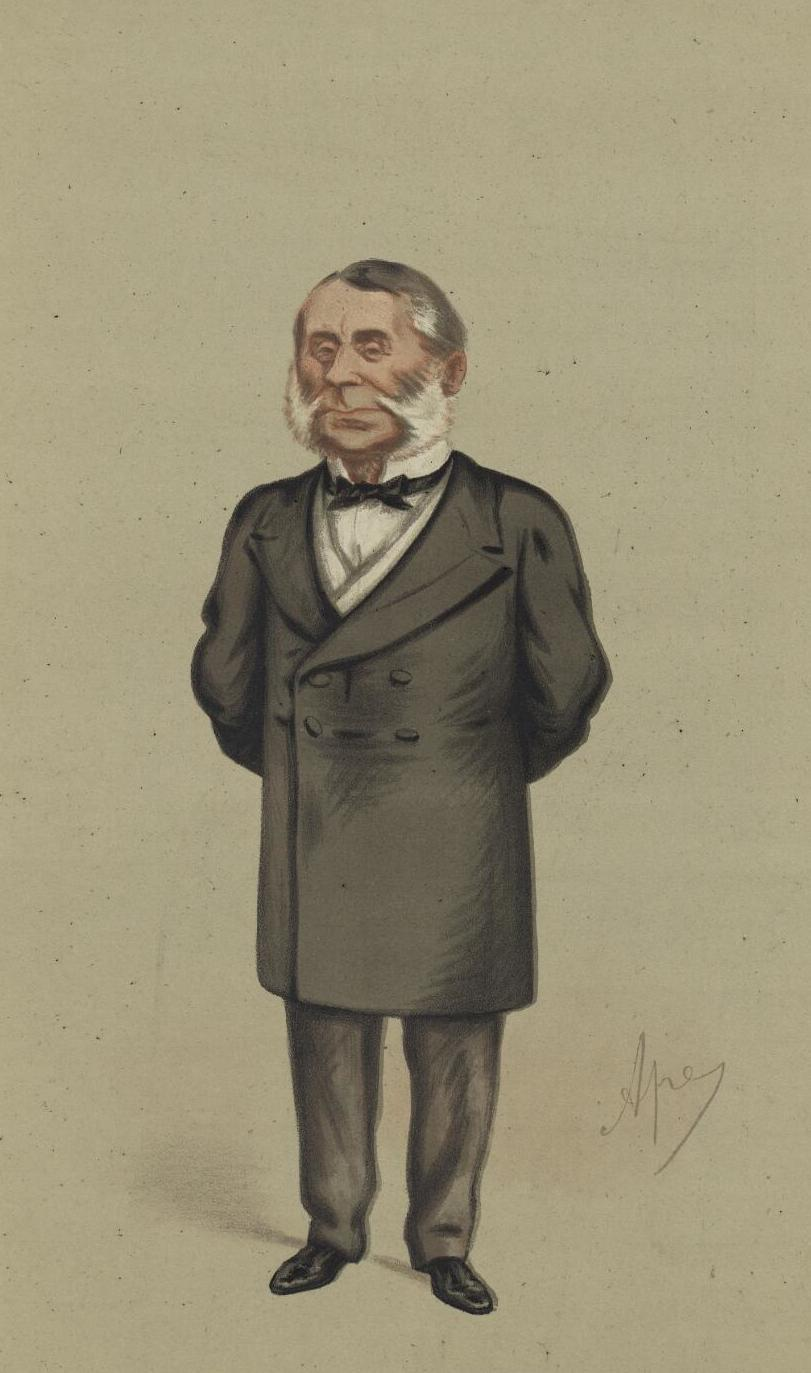
Edward Watkin

London-born businessman Absalom Watkin (1787–1861) purchased Rose Hill, a large villa off Longley Lane (now on Bronington Close), in 1832 as his family home. Watkin was a Liberal reformer and became a significant figure in Manchester politics, campaigning for an enquiry into the 1819 Peterloo Massacre. His son, Sir Edward Watkin (1819–1901), who became Lord Watkin of Rose Hill, was a Victorian railway magnate. He is especially remembered for his ambitious expansion of London's Metropolitan Railway and his visionary schemes for a Channel Tunnel and a London rival to the Eiffel Tower. Today, Rose Hill is a Grade II* listed building.

== In popular culture ==
Manchester indie rock band Doves wrote a song called "Northenden" that was included as a bonus track on their 2002 album The Last Broadcast; its lyrics include:

The kids are deranged
They love guns and kidnap
That's just the way we do things here
The day dies down
Not a moment too soon
Under the Northenden afternoon.

== See also ==
- Listed buildings in Manchester-M22
- Listed buildings in Manchester-M23
