= Watkin baronets =

Extinct baronetcy in the Baronetage of the United Kingdom

- Escutcheon of the Watkin baronets of Northenden
- Creation date: 1880
- Status: extinct
- Extinction date: 1914

The Watkin Baronetcy, of Northenden in the County Palatine of Chester (now Cheshire), was a title in the Baronetage of the United Kingdom. It was created on 12 May 1880 for the railway magnate and politician Sir Edward William Watkin. He was succeeded by his son the 2nd Baronet, who sat as Member of Parliament for Great Grimsby. The title became extinct on the 2nd Baronet's death in 1914.

== Watkin baronets, of Northenden (1880) ==
- Sir Edward William Watkin, 1st Baronet (1819–1901)
- Sir Alfred Mellor Watkin, 2nd Baronet (1846–1914)

Baronetage of the United Kingdom
Preceded by Goldney baronets	Watkin baronets of Northenden; 12 May 1880	Succeeded by Bates baronets
