= Edward Watkin =

British railway entrepreneur (1819–1901)

Sir Edward Watkin Bt
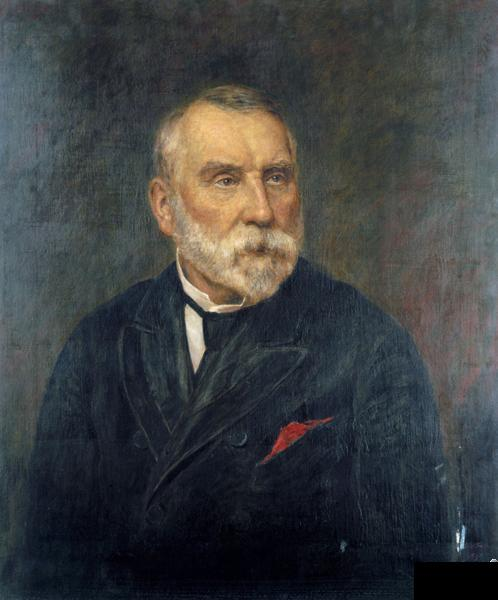
- Watkin by Augustus Henry Fox now in the National Railway Museum
- Born: 26 September 1819
- Died: 13 April 1901 (aged 81)
- Spouse(s): (1) Mary Briggs Mellor (d.1888); (2) Ann Ingram
- Children: 2: Alfred Mellor Watkin (son)
- Relatives: William Thompson Watkin (cousin)

Sir Edward William Watkin, 1st Baronet (26 September 1819 – 13 April 1901) was a British Member of Parliament and railway entrepreneur. He was an ambitious visionary, and presided over large-scale railway engineering projects to fulfil his business aspirations, eventually rising to become chairman of nine different British railway companies.

Among his more notable projects were: his expansion of the Metropolitan Railway, part of today's London Underground; the construction of the Great Central Main Line, a purpose-built high-speed railway line; the creation of a pleasure garden with a partially constructed iron tower at Wembley; and a failed attempt to dig a Channel Tunnel under the English Channel to connect his railway empire to the French rail network.

== Early life ==
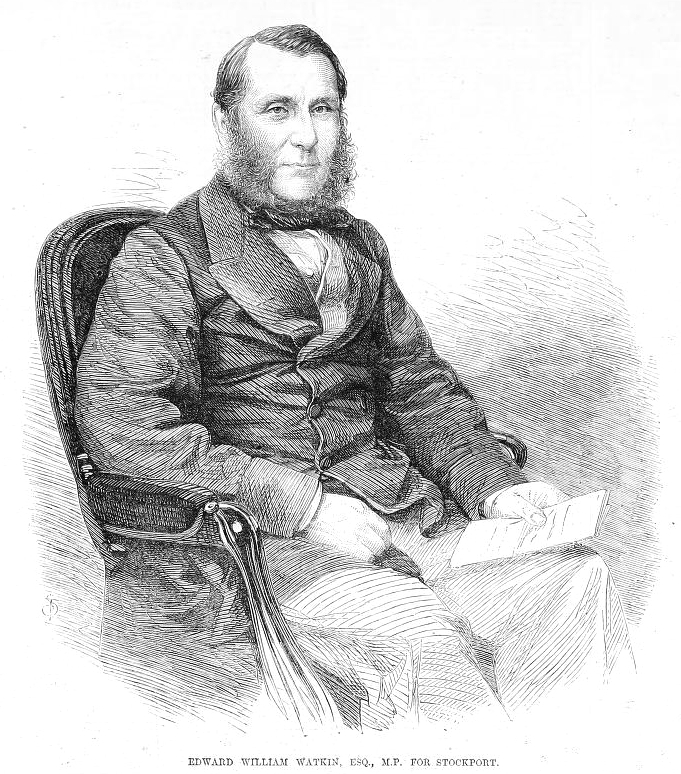

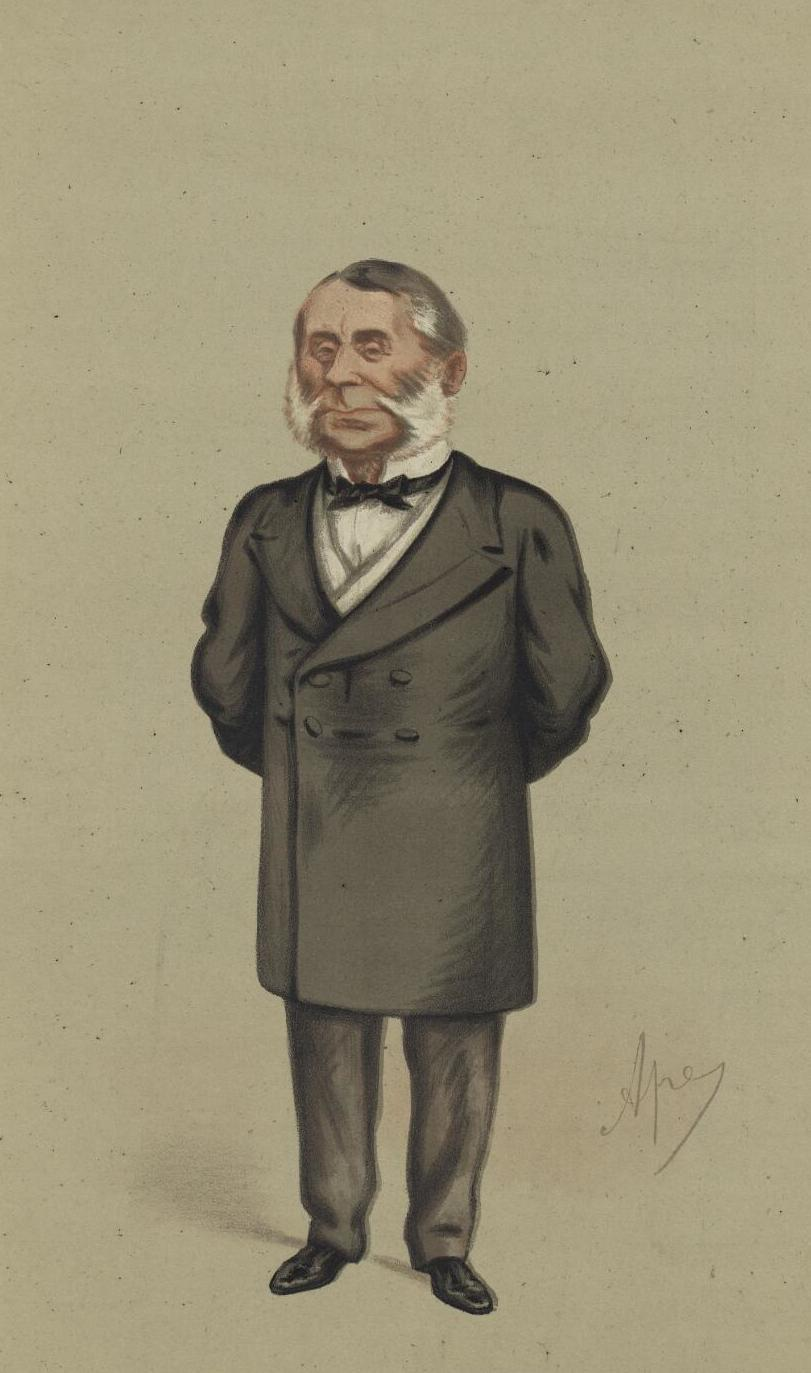
"The Railway Interest". Caricature by Ape published in Vanity Fair in 1875.

Watkin was born in Salford, Lancashire, the son of wealthy cotton merchant Absalom Watkin,. After a private education, Watkin worked in his father's mill business. Watkin's father was closely involved in the Anti-Corn Law League, and Edward soon joined him, rising to become a key League organiser in Manchester. Through this work, Watkin gained the friendship of the Radical leader Richard Cobden, with whom he remained in contact for the rest of Cobden's life.

From 1839 to 1840 Watkin was one of the directors of the Manchester Athenaeum. In 1843 he wrote a pamphlet entitled "A Plea for Public Parks" and was involved in a committee which successfully sought the provision of parks in Manchester and Salford. He also took a prominent role in the Saturday Half-holiday Movement. In 1845, Watkin co-founded the Manchester Examiner, by which time he had become a partner in his father's business.

== Railways ==
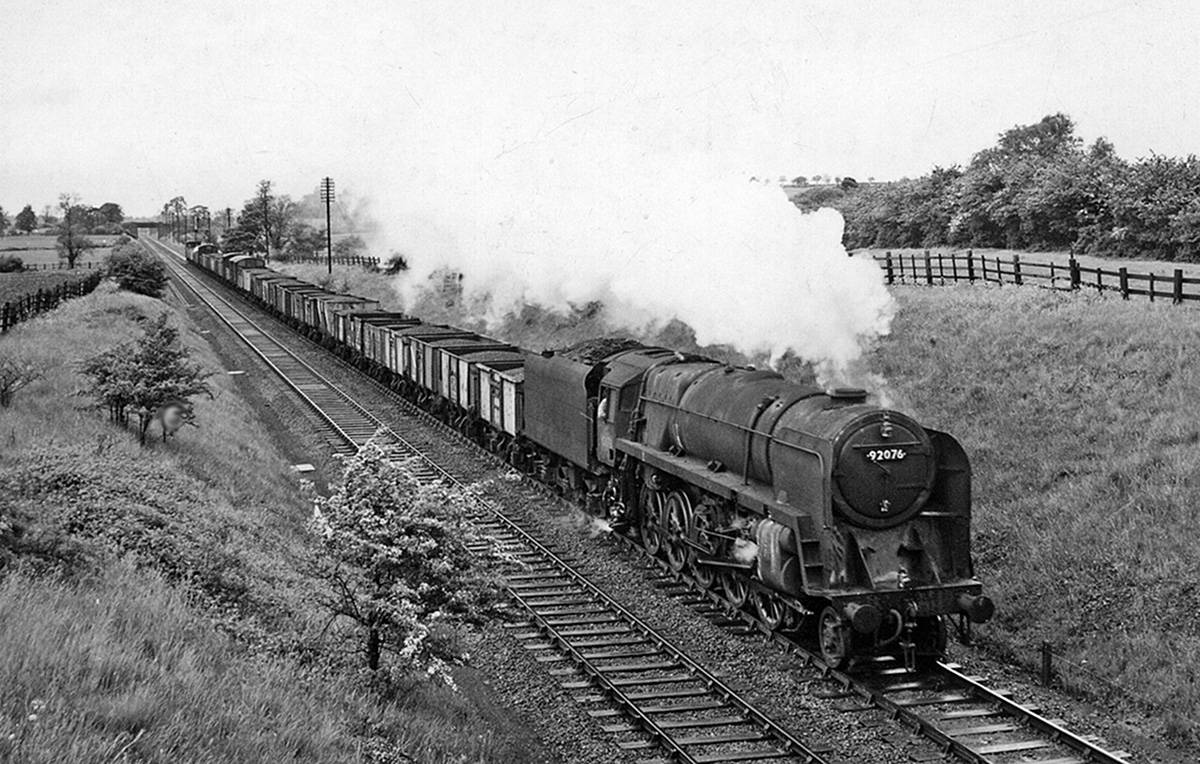
Watkin's high-speed Great Central Main Line

Watkin began to show an interest in railways and in 1845 he took on the secretaryship of the Trent Valley Railway, which was sold the following year to the London and North Western Railway (LNWR), for £438,000. He then became assistant to Captain Mark Huish, general manager of the LNWR. He visited USA and Canada and in 1852 he published a book about the railways in these countries. Back in Great Britain he was appointed secretary of the proposed Worcester and Hereford Railway.

In January 1854 he became the general manager of the Manchester Sheffield & Lincolnshire Railway (MS&LR), a position held until 1861. In 1863 he was persuaded to return as a director of the company and shortly afterward became chairman, holding the position from 1864 to 1894. He was knighted in 1868 and made a baronet in 1880.

Manager from 1858, then president 1862–69, of the Grand Trunk Railway of eastern Canada, he promoted the Intercolonial Railway, which eventually connected Halifax with the GTR system in Quebec. His grand vision was a transcontinental railway lying largely within Canada, but owing to the sparse population west of Lake Superior, the scheme could not be profitable in the absence of government financial backing. Opposition to the idea within the company led to Watkin's ouster. The GTR would later miss various opportunities to build a viable Canadian transcontinental railway.

Abroad, he helped to build the Athens–Piraeus Electric Railways, advised on the Indian Railways and organised transport in the Belgian Congo.

Watkin was involved with other railway companies. In 1866 he became a director of the Great Western Railway and in January 1868 the Great Eastern Railway. In fact it was Watkin who recommended Robert Cecil, who is credited with leading the GER out of its financial crisis. Watkin resigned as a director of the GER in August 1872.

By 1881 he was a director of nine railways and trustee of a tenth. These included the Cheshire Lines Committee, the East London, the Manchester, Sheffield and Lincolnshire, the Manchester, South Junction & Altrincham, the Metropolitan, the Oldham, Ashton & Guide Bridge, the Sheffield & Midland Joint, the South Eastern, the Wigan Junction and the New York, Lake Erie and Western railways.

He was instrumental in the creation of the MS&LR's 'London Extension', Sheffield to Marylebone, the Great Central Main Line, opened in 1899.

=== Channel tunnel ===
For Watkin, opening an independent route to London was crucial for the long-term survival and development of the MS&LR, but it was also one part of a grander scheme: a line from Manchester to Paris. His chairmanships of the South Eastern Railway, the Metropolitan Railway, in addition to the MS&LR meant that he controlled railways from England's south coast ports, through London and (with the London Extension) through the Midlands to the industrial cities of the North; he was also on the board of the Chemin de Fer du Nord, a French railway company based in Calais. Watkin's ambitious plan was to develop a railway route which could carry passenger trains directly from Liverpool and Manchester to Paris, crossing from Britain to France via a tunnel under the English Channel.

The Great Central Railway's main line to London was also built to a comparatively generous structure gauge, but contrary to popular belief it was not built to a 'continental' gauge, not least because there were no agreed dimensions for such a gauge until the Berne Gauge Convention was signed in 1912. Healy mentions two bridges which were built to "unusual dimensions ... to provide for possible widenings in case the Channel Tunnel project ever took off ..."

Watkin started his tunnel works with the South Eastern Railway in 1880–81. Digging began at Shakespeare Cliff between Folkestone and Dover and reached a length of 2,020 yards (1,850 m). The project was highly controversial and fears grew of the tunnel being used as a route for a possible French invasion of Great Britain; notable opponents of the project were the War Office Scientific Committee, Lord Wolseley and Prince George, Duke of Cambridge;

Queen Victoria reportedly found the tunnel scheme "objectionable". Watkin was skilled at public relations and attempted to garner political support for his project, inviting such high-profile guests as the Prince and Princess of Wales, Liberal Party Leader William Gladstone and the Archbishop of Canterbury to submarine champagne receptions in the tunnel. In spite of his attempts at winning support, his tunnel project was blocked by parliament, then cancelled in the interests of national security. The original entrance to Watkin's tunnel works remains in the cliff face but is now closed for safety reasons.

== Wembley Park and Watkin's Tower ==
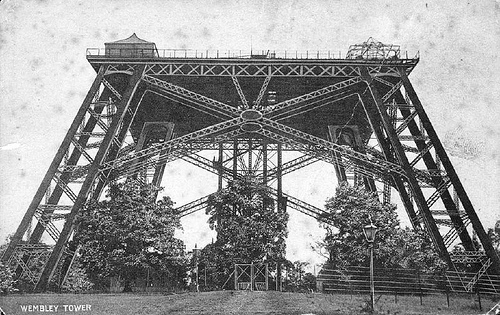
The first and only completed stage of Watkin's Wembley Tower (c.1900)

Watkin's last project was the construction of a large iron tower, called Watkin's Tower, in Wembley Park, north-west London. The 1,200-foot (370 m) tower was to be the centrepiece of a large public amusement park which he opened in May 1894 to attract London passengers onto his Metropolitan Railway. The park was served by Wembley Park station, which officially opened in the same month, though it had in fact been open on Saturdays since October 1893 to cater for football matches in the pleasure gardens.

Watkin's vision of Wembley Park as a day-out destination for Londoners had far-reaching consequences, shaping the history and use of the area to the present day. Without Watkin's pleasure gardens and station it is unlikely that the British Empire Exhibition would have been held at Wembley, which in turn would have prevented Wembley becoming either synonymous with English football or a successful popular music venue. Without Watkin, it is likely that the district would have simply become inter-war semi-detached suburbia like the rest of west London.

The tower was intended to rival the Eiffel Tower in Paris. The foundations of the tower were laid in 1892, the first stage was completed in September 1895 and it was opened to the public in 1896.

After an initial burst of popularity, the tower failed to draw large crowds. Of the 100,000 visitors to the Park in 1896 rather less than a fifth paid to go up the Tower. Furthermore, the marshy site proved unsuitable for such a structure. Whether the original design (which was to have had eight legs) would have distributed the weight more evenly cannot be known, but by 1896 the four-legged tower was clearly tilting. In addition, Watkin had retired from the chairmanship of the Metropolitan in 1894 after suffering a stroke, so the tower's enthusiastic champion was gone. In June 1897 the tower was illuminated for Queen Victoria's 60th Jubilee, but it was never extended beyond the first stage.

In 1902 the Tower, now known as ‘Watkin's Folly’, was declared unsafe (though this was because of concerns about the safety of the lifts, rather than directly about the subsidence) and closed to the public. In 1904 it was decided to demolish the structure, a process that ended with the foundations being destroyed by explosives in 1907, leaving four large holes in the ground. The Empire Stadium (later known as Wembley Stadium) was built on the site in 1923.

== Political career ==
Throughout his life, Watkin was a strong supporter of Manchester Liberalism. This did not equate to consistent support for a single party. Watkin was first elected Liberal Member of Parliament for Great Yarmouth (1857–1858), and then Stockport (1864–1868). He unsuccessfully contested the East Cheshire seat in 1869. He was knighted in 1868 and became a baronet in 1880. He was also High Sheriff of Cheshire in 1874.

In 1874, he was elected Liberal MP for Hythe in Kent. He increasingly moved away from the Liberal party under William Ewart Gladstone and in 1880 it was claimed that he had taken the Conservative whip. He never stood for election as a Conservative and continued to sit with the Liberals. Between 1880 and 1886, he was regarded variously as a Liberal, a Conservative and an independent. In 1886, he voted against Gladstone's Irish Home Rule bill and was thereafter commonly described as a Liberal Unionist.

The confusion over his status came to the fore when he resigned his Hythe seat in 1895. The Liberal Unionists and the Conservatives were in alliance and each claimed incumbency and the right to nominate his replacement. Watkin for his part insisted that he was a Liberal, albeit one who had moved away from the official party. The Conservative Aretas Akers-Douglas commented that no one knew what his politics were, except that he had voted for anyone or anything to get support for his Channel Tunnel. The Conservatives forced the Liberal Unionists to back down and won the seat in the 1895 United Kingdom general election.

== Personal life ==
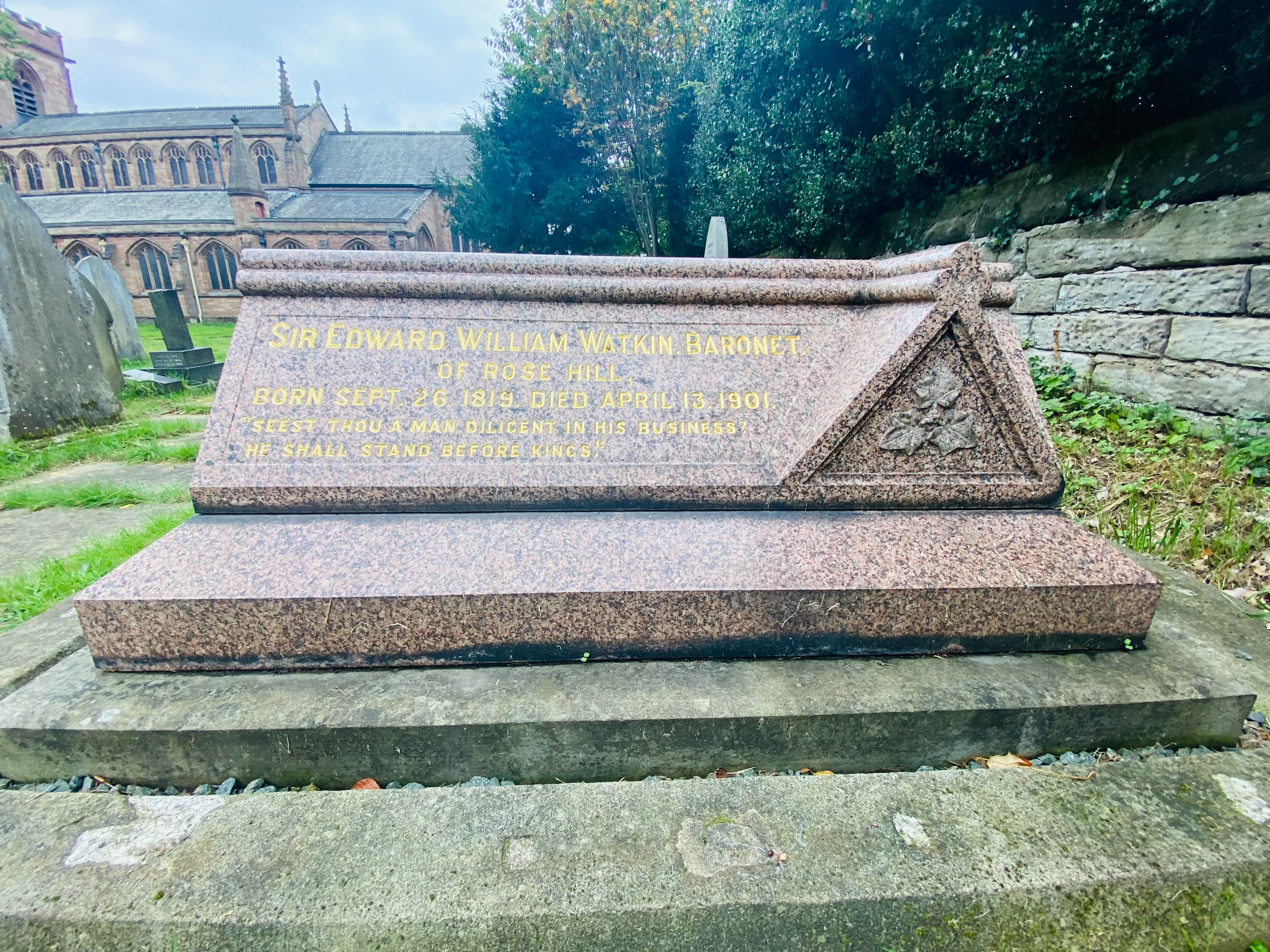
Edward Watkin's grave in St Wilfrid's churchyard, Northenden

Watkin lived at Rose Hill, a large house in Northenden, Manchester. The family home was purchased by his father in 1832 and Edward inherited it upon his father's death in 1861.

Watkin married Mary Briggs Mellor in 1845, with whom he had two children. Their son, Alfred Mellor Watkin, became locomotive superintendent of the South Eastern Railway in 1876 and Member of Parliament for the Great Grimsby constituency in 1877. A daughter, Harriette Sayer Watkin, was born in 1850. Mary Watkin died on 8 March 1888.

After four years a widower, Watkin married Ann Ingram, widow of Herbert Ingram, on 6 April 1892.

Edward Watkin died on 13 April 1901 and was buried in the family grave in the churchyard of St Wilfrid's, Northenden, where a memorial plaque commemorates his life.

== Notes ==
Parliament of the United Kingdom
Preceded by Charles Edmund Rumbold; Sir Edmund Lacon	Member of Parliament for Great Yarmouth; 1857 – August 1857; With: William Torrens McCullagh	Succeeded by Adolphus William Young; John Mellor
Preceded by James Kershaw; John Benjamin Smith	Member of Parliament for Stockport; 1864–1868; With: John Benjamin Smith	Succeeded by William Tipping; John Benjamin Smith
Preceded by Baron Amschel de Rothschild	Member of Parliament for Hythe; 1874–1895	Succeeded by Sir James Bevan Edwards
Baronetage of the United Kingdom
New title	Baronet (of Rose Hill); 1880–1901	Succeeded by Alfred Mellor Watkin
