= Rose Hill, Northenden =

Listed building in Manchester, England

Rose Hill
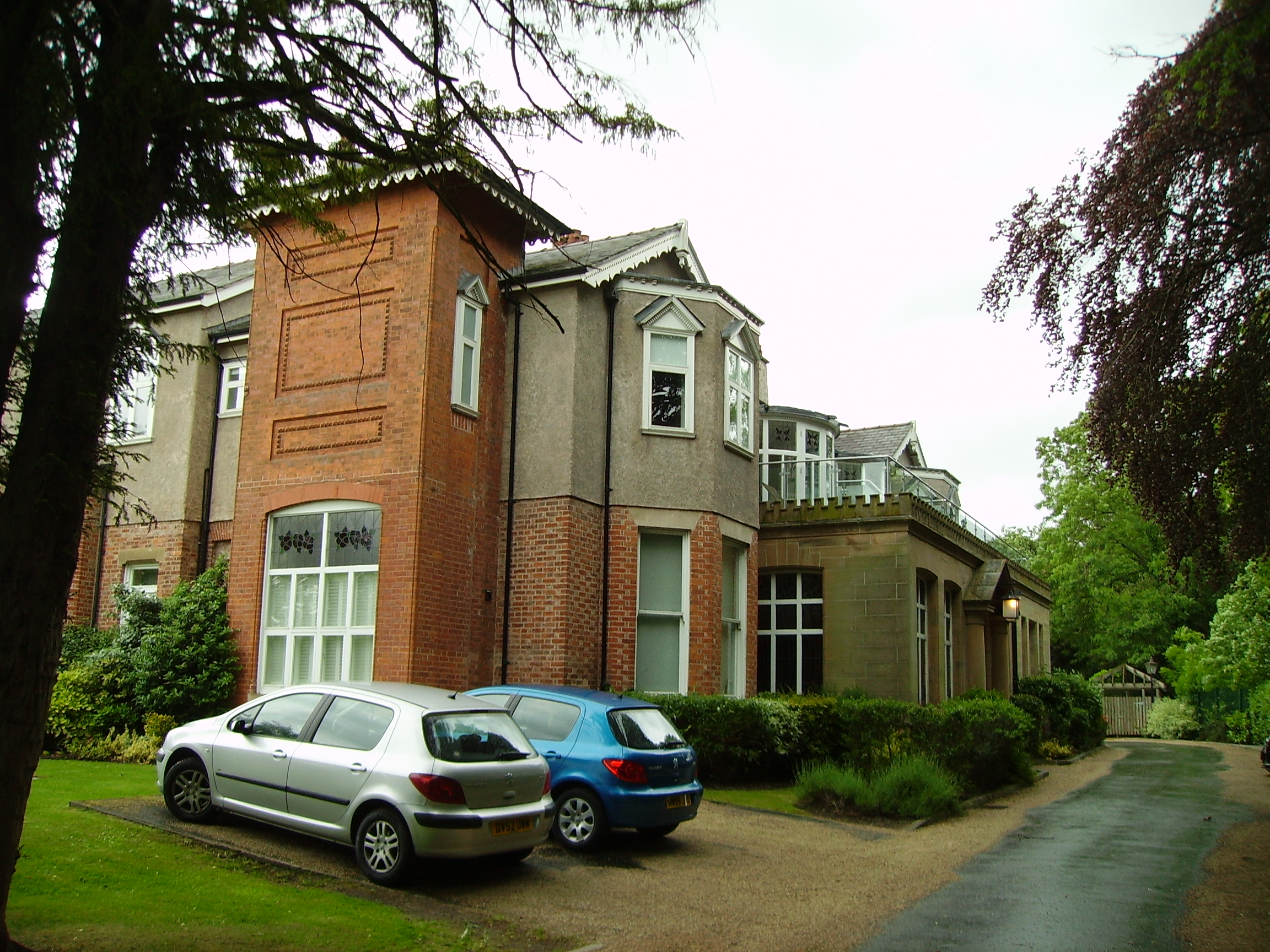
- Rose Hill in 2011

- Location within Greater Manchester

General information
- Type: Villa
- Architectural style: Victorian Gothic
- Location: Longley Lane, Northenden, Manchester, England
- Coordinates: 53.4017°N 2.2488°W
- Year built: Mid-19th century
- Renovated: c. 1900 (extended and remodelled)

Technical details
- Material: Red brick and ashlar

Design and construction
- Designations

Listed Building – Grade II*
- Official name: Rose Hill
- Designated: 10 April 1991
- Reference no.: 1291365
- Known for: Home of Absalom Watkin and Sir Edward Watkin; children's home (1955–1990)

Rose Hill is a Grade II* listed mid-19th-century Victorian villa on Longley Lane in Northenden, a suburb of Manchester, England. Originally a private residence associated with the Watkin family, including the transport entrepreneur Sir Edward Watkin, it was later adapted for institutional use and in the late 20th century operated as a children's home. The house has since been converted into flats.

== History ==
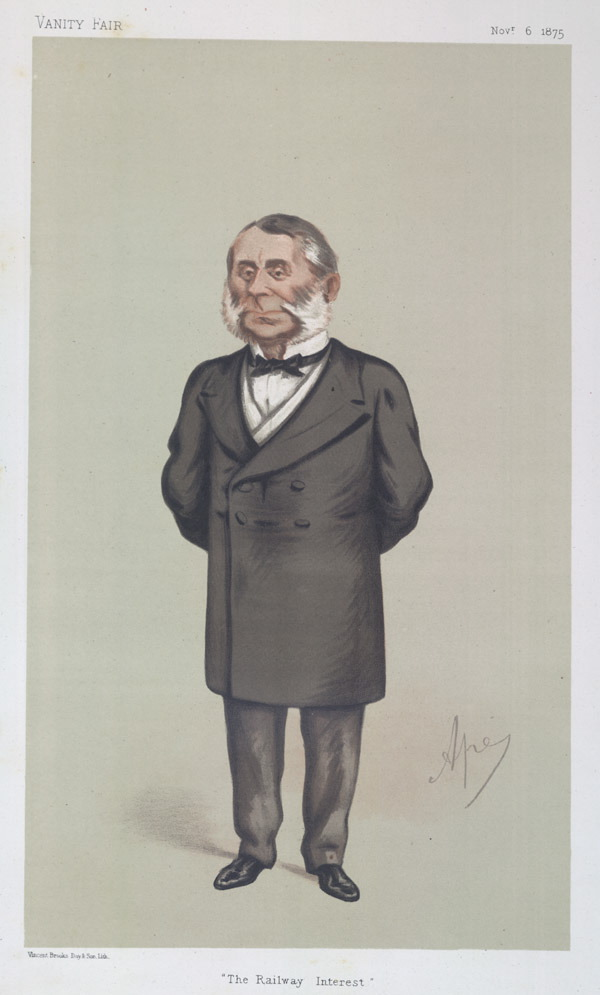
Cartoon of Sir Edward Watkin (Vanity Fair, 1875)

Although the official listing dates the existing building to the mid‑19th century, the property at Rose Hill was acquired in 1832 by the cotton merchant Absalom Watkin (1787–1861). Watkin was a social and political reformer, an anti corn law campaigner and a diarist, recording life in early Victorian Manchester.

The house was inherited by Absalom's son, Edward Watkin, a noted transport entrepreneur who made his fortune as the managing director of nine separate railway companies during the major expansion of the railways in mid-Victorian Britain. Described as a "railway king and cross-channel visionary", he drove the expansion of the Metropolitan Railway into the rural areas outside London and founded the Channel Tunnel Company in 1875, which undertook the first large-scale attempt to link England and France. He also began construction of the "Great Tower of London", a proposed structure larger than the Eiffel Tower on the site of the present Wembley Stadium, but the project was abandoned after reaching a height of 155 feet (47 m). Rose Hill was later extended and remodelled around 1900.

In the 20th century, Rose Hill ceased to be a private dwelling. In 1915 it was purchased by the Manchester Poor Law Union for use as a residential school for children suffering from ophthalmia. It was later used as a children's convalescent home and a nursery school, before being taken over in 1955 by Manchester Corporation as a children's home and juvenile remand home. The childcare facility closed in the 1990s and was subsequently the subject of a wide-ranging investigation into child abuse in Manchester's care homes from the 1960s to the 1980s.

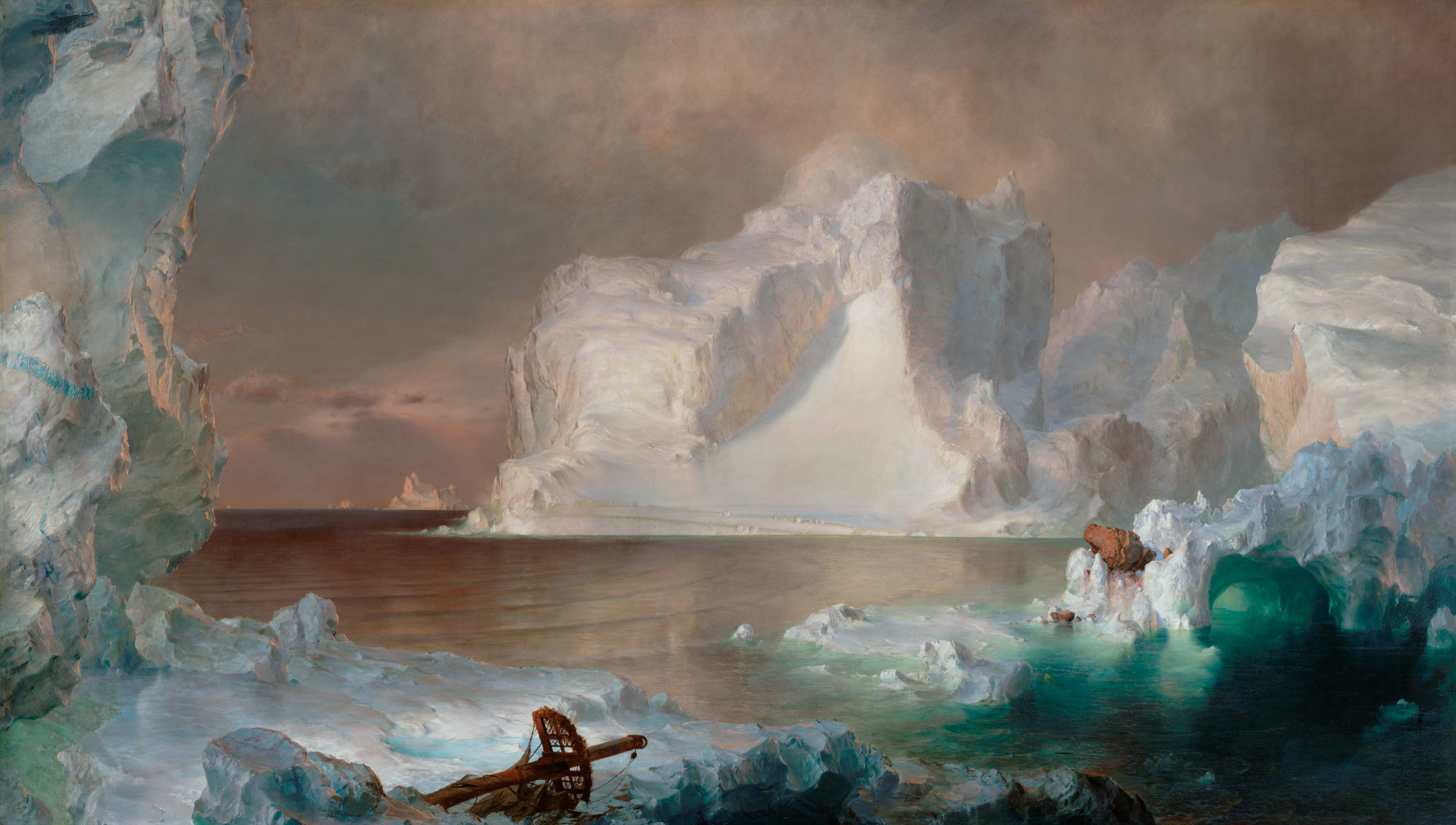
The Icebergs by Frederic Edwin Church (1861)

In 1979 a major landscape painting by the American artist Frederic Edwin Church was discovered at Rose Hill. The Icebergs had been bought by Sir Edward in the 1860s and, following his death, was subsequently forgotten. The painting is now in the collection of the Dallas Museum of Art in Texas.

On 10 April 1991, the house was designated a Grade II* listed building.

Rose Hill was converted into flats in 2003, and most of the grounds were built over with private housing.

Another house named Rose Hill in Didsbury, approximately 1 mile (1.6 km) north-east of the Northenden house, was the home of the broadcaster Olive Shapley, who founded the Rose Hill Trust for Unsupported Mothers and Babies.

== Architecture ==
The building is mainly brick, with much of it rendered, and has a dressed‑stone front addition. It has a Welsh slate roof with brick ridge chimneys. The layout centres on a courtyard, with a front extension, and consists of two storeys with a single‑storey range in front. This front section is in ashlar and has six windows: wooden mullion‑and‑transom windows to the left, and a tripartite sash window to the right. The main entrance is a pair of doors with a large fanlight set in an arched opening framed by Tuscan columns and a broken pediment. The front also has a plinth, a cill band, and a battlemented parapet to the flat roof, with an additional window on the left side.

Behind this is the main block, which has gabled ends and a slightly recessed centre. It has four bays of projecting windows: canted bays at each end and a rounded bay in the centre. The two‑storey bay on the left has later windows at ground level and older cross‑mullioned or transomed windows with pediments above. A similar upper bay stands above the front extension. The gables have shaped bargeboards and pendants. The sides of the building contain a mixture of mullion‑and‑transom windows and sashes with glazing bars, and similar windows face into the central courtyard.

A contemporary assessment described the front as "a single‑storey loggia of the finest ashlar with Doric order pilasters”, noting that "toy battlements appear elsewhere" and that "the interiors are especially fine".

=== Interior ===
The main feature of the interior is the entrance and staircase hall created in the c. 1900 extension. It has timber panelling, a decorative frieze on canvas painted with swags and Renaissance‑style motifs, and a moulded ceiling. The fireplace is elaborate, with a beaten‑copper hood and an Art Nouveau panel behind it. The windows and doors contain high‑quality Art Nouveau stained glass with designs of rose trees, birds, and other plants, using clear glass as part of the pattern. The hall opens through a triple arcade to a staircase with richly carved wooden balusters, in an Art Nouveau interpretation of a Carolean design.

Elsewhere inside, there is further decorative ceiling work in wood or plaster, including in the chapel, and an ornate mid‑19th‑century marble fireplace in the drawing room. Additional stained glass appears in the heads of the two bay windows above the entrance hall and in windows on the left side of the building.

== See also ==
- Grade II* listed buildings in Greater Manchester
- Listed buildings in Manchester-M22

== Bibliography ==
- Hartwell, Clare; Hyde, Matthew; Pevsner, Nikolaus (2004), Lancashire: Manchester and the South East, The Buildings of England, New Haven, CT; London: Yale University Press, ISBN 0-300-10583-5
- Hartwell, Clare (2001), Manchester, Pevsner Architectural Guides, London: Penguin, ISBN 0-14-071131-7
