= Wythenshawe Hall =

Listed building in Manchester, England

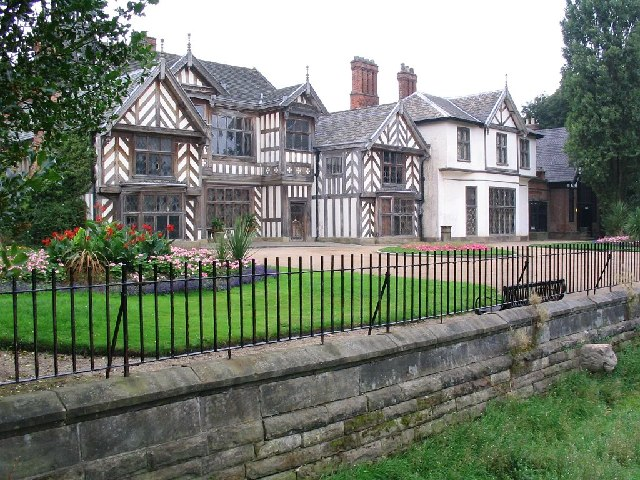
- Wythenshawe Hall in 2005

- Location within Greater Manchester

General information
- Location: Wythenshawe, Manchester, England
- Coordinates: 53°24′17.4″N 2°16′40″W
- Year built: c. 1540
- Client: Robert Tatton

Design and construction
- Designations

Listed Building – Grade II*
- Official name: Wythenshawe Hall
- Designated: 25 February 1952
- Reference no.: 1255034

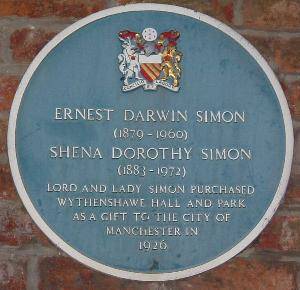
Plaque commemorating the gift to the city

Wythenshawe Hall is a 16th-century timber-framed historic house and former manor house in Wythenshawe, Manchester, England, 5 miles (8.0 km) south of the city centre in Wythenshawe Park. Built for Robert Tatton, it was home to the Tatton family for almost 400 years. Its basic plan is a central hall with two projecting wings.

In the winter of 1643–44, the house was besieged by Parliamentarian forces during the English Civil War. Despite the stout defence put up by Tatton and his fellow Royalists, the defenders were overwhelmed by the Roundheads' superior weaponry.

Rebuilding work was carried out at the end of the 18th century, and various additions made in the 19th century, including a walled garden, an ice house, glass houses and a tenant's hall. (Note: Hospitality, traditionally doled out to visitors, freeholders and tenants at country and manor houses in the Middle Ages, became a drain on the family's purse. Rather than abandoning the practice, in some houses from the 18th century the tenants and other visitors on business were still entertained to refreshments but in a tenant's hall in the servant's quarters rather than the great hall or parlour. It was where rents were paid and some houses held celebratory dinners at Christmas or family occasions attended by members of the family.) Wythenshawe Hall and its surrounding parkland were donated to Manchester Corporation in 1926, and in 1930 it was opened to the public as a museum.

The building was badly damaged in an arson attack in March 2016; the hall finally reopened to visitors in September 2022 after extensive repairs.

== History ==
A pre-1300 charter mentions an enclosed deer park in Wythenshawe where the Tatton family owned land in 1297. Around 1540, Robert Tatton of Chester built Wythenshawe Hall as the Tatton family residence. The timber-framed Tudor house was the home of the family for almost 400 years and may originally have had a moat.

The hall was besieged during the English Civil War over the winter of 1643–44 by Robert Duckenfield's Parliamentarian forces. It was defended by Royalists led by Robert Tatton until the Roundheads brought two cannons to the hall from Manchester, leading to the Royalist surrender on 27 February 1644. The Parliamentarians subsequently confiscated Wythenshawe Hall, but it was returned to the Tatton family on payment of a fine of just over £700. After recovering the estate, the family expanded it to about 2,500 acres (1,000 ha).

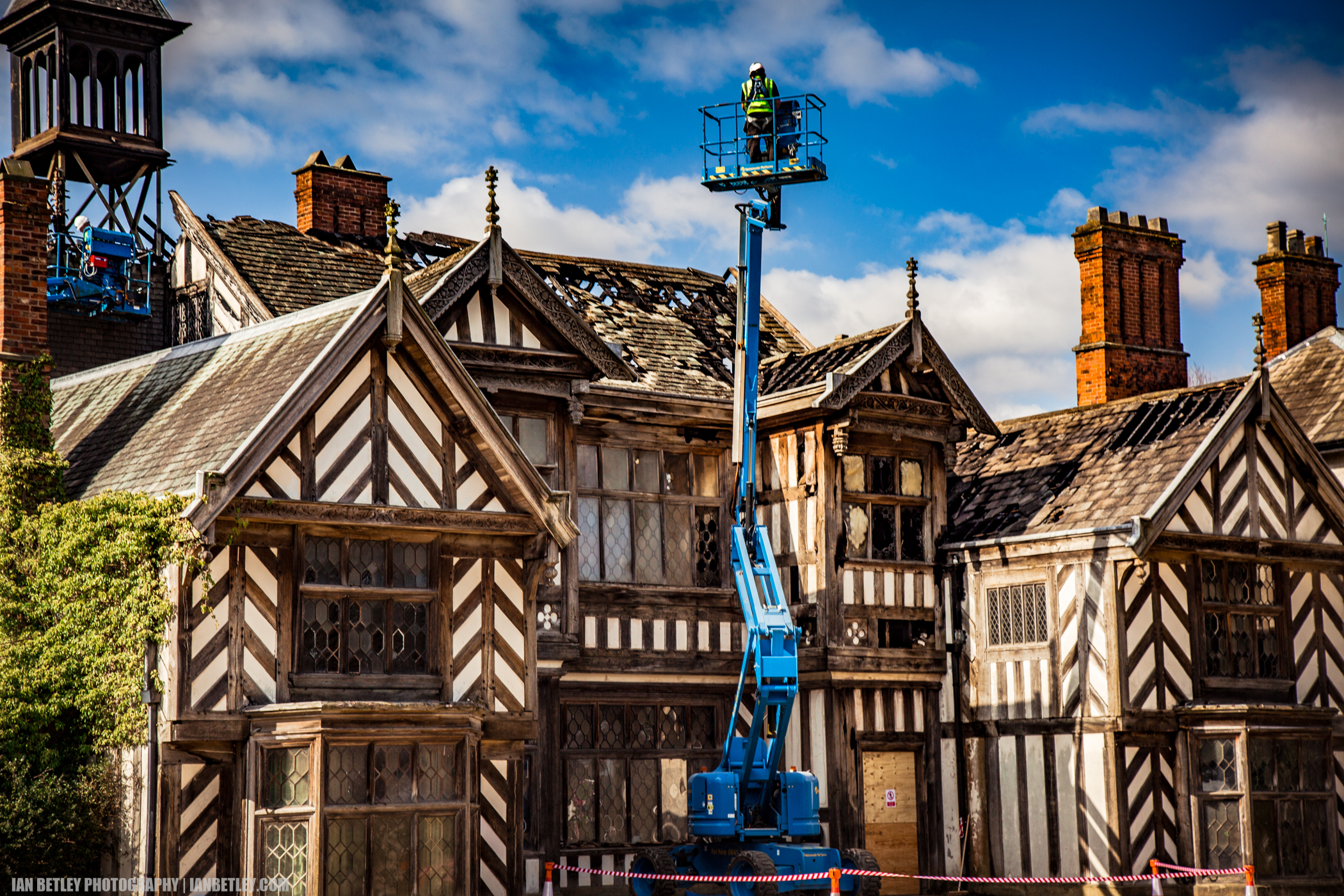
Damage to Wythenshawe Hall after the 2016 fire

In 1924 Robert Henry Grenville Tatton inherited the Wythenshawe estate. There was interest from Manchester Corporation, who wanted land to build a garden suburb, ostensibly to rehouse tenants from slum clearance. By April 1926 Wythenshawe Hall and 250 acres (1 km^{2}) of its surrounding estate had been sold to Ernest Simon, 1st Baron Simon of Wythenshawe and Shena Simon, Lady Simon of Wythenshawe, who donated them to Manchester Corporation "to be used solely for the public good". Later that year, the corporation purchased the rest of the estate, and went on to build one of the largest housing estates in Europe on the land.

Repairs were made to the hall in the 1950s, and it was designated as a Grade II* listed building on 25 February 1952. Its former stable block, to the west of the hall, was Grade II listed in 1974.

The roof of the hall and an upper floor were severely damaged by a fire that started at around 3:30 am on 15 March 2016; the clock tower was also damaged. On 23 March, Jeremy Taylor of Wythenshawe was charged with arson in connection with the fire. In July 2017, after changing his plea and admitting guilt, he was sentenced to four and a half years in prison. The hall was added to the Heritage at Risk Register in October 2016. A planning application to restore the building was submitted in November 2016, with the intention of keeping as much of the original material as possible; the repairs were completed at a cost of £6.7 million and the building reopened to the public in September 2022.

== Architecture ==
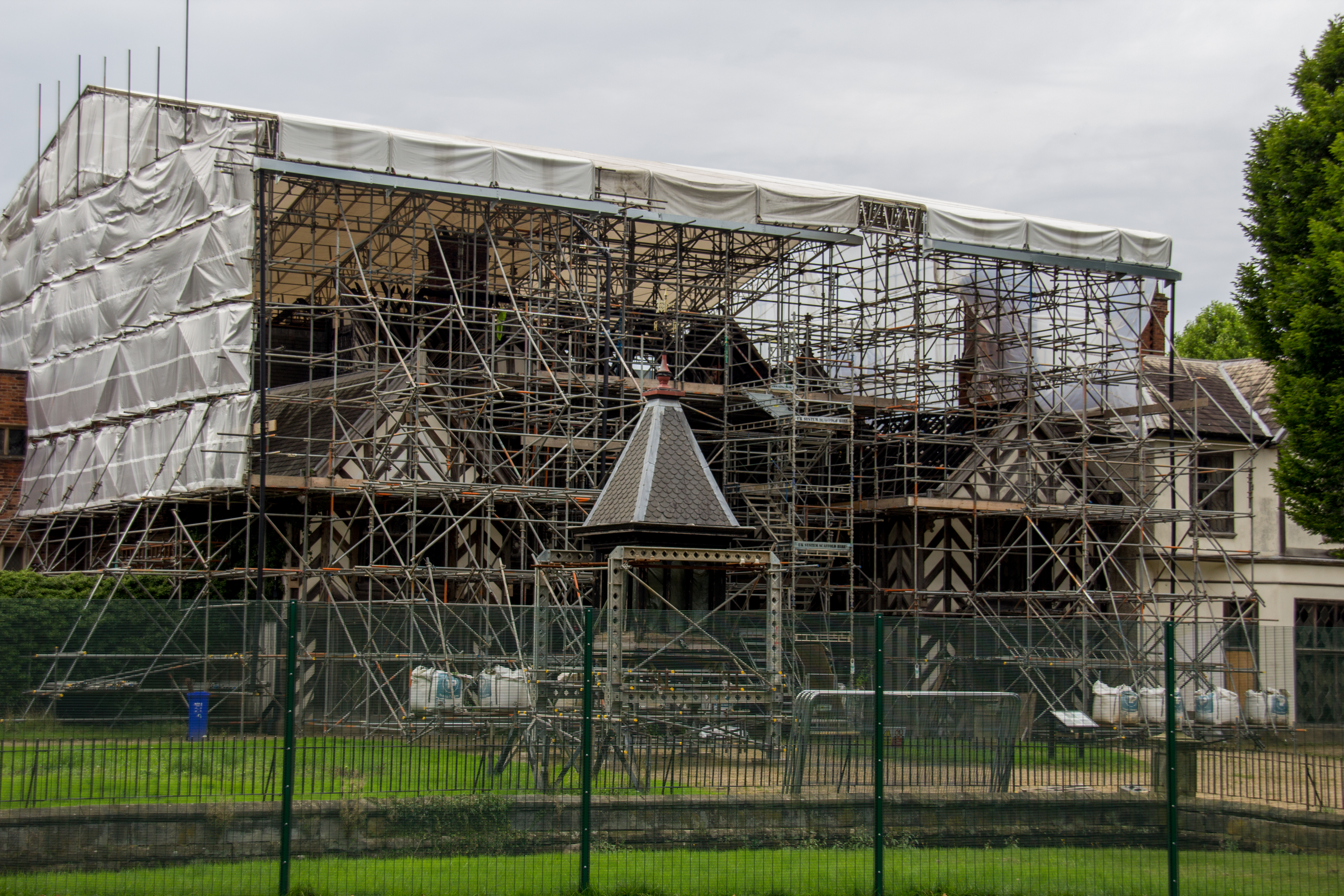
Wythenshawe Hall in August 2016, with protective scaffolding and the tower removed

The hall was partially rebuilt between 1795 and 1800 by Lewis Wyatt. It was altered around 1840 possibly by Edward Blore. Additions included a walled garden, an ice house, and glass houses. In the Victorian era the dining room was refurbished and a tenant's hall was added.

The timber-framed manor house has a hall with two projecting wings, and a porch and dais bays. The entrance hall (also known as the ante-room) is thought to have previously been a chapel, which was subsequently turned into a billiards room, before becoming an entrance hall in the 1870s.

== Museum ==
In 1930 the hall was turned into a museum and art gallery. Most of the hall's original furniture was removed by the Tatton family in 1926 when they moved out, and most of the furniture and paintings displayed in the hall during its time as a museum were from the Manchester City Galleries collection.

Until 2007 a re-enactment of the 1643 siege of Wythenshawe Hall by Cromwell's troops was staged every July.

By 2004 the hall was only open once a week for four months in the year and in 2010 closed completely as a result of council spending cuts. One proposition was that Manchester City Council could sell the building to the National Trust. In summer 2012, the hall re-opened for 10 days for the Wythenshawe Games. A friends group was established in September 2012 to hold monthly open days and regular events at the hall. Furniture installed by the friends group (including a four-poster bed engraved with the Tatton family crest) was not damaged by the fire.

== Park ==
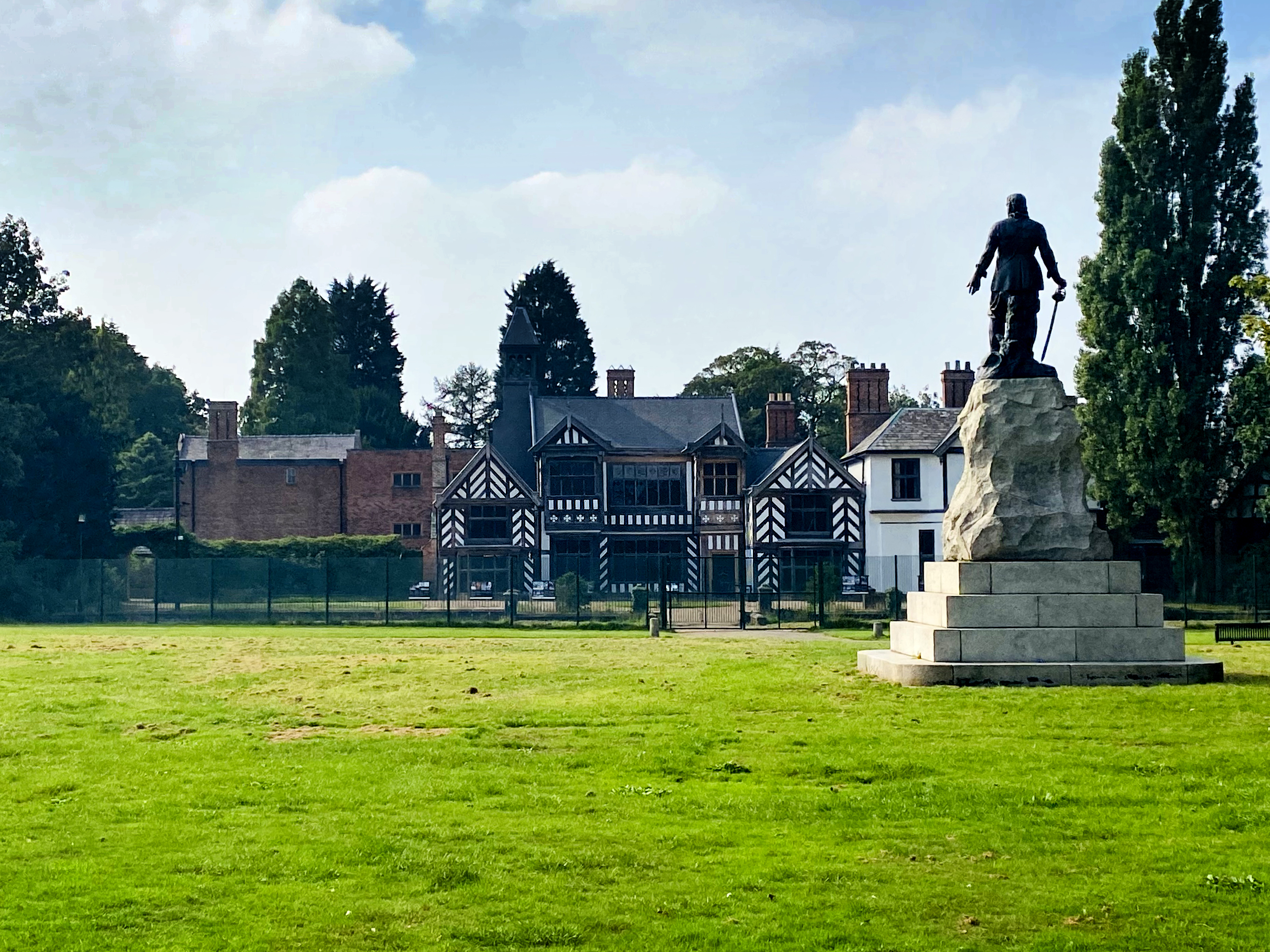
The statue of Oliver Cromwell in front of Wythenshawe Hall

Wythenshawe Park occupies 270 acres (1.1 km^{2}) of land surrounding the hall in Northern Moor. The park contains a mix of woodland, bedding, borders, grassland and meadows, sports and games facilities, and Wythenshawe community farm and a horticulture centre North Lodge, the Grade II listed gate lodge on the park's northern boundary was built in the Tudor style in the mid to late 19th century.

Facing the hall stands a 7.16-metre-tall (23.5 ft) bronze statue of Oliver Cromwell on a granite plinth and pedestal, sculpted by Matthew Noble in 1875. Now Grade II listed, it was moved from its original location on Deansgate to the park in 1968.

== See also ==
- Grade II* listed buildings in Greater Manchester
- Listed buildings in Manchester-M23
