= Gorenc =

Gorenc is a surname. Notable people with the surname include:

- Boris Gorenc (born 1973), Slovenian basketball player
- Frank Gorenc (born 1957), American four-star general, brother of Stanley
- Jan Gorenc (born 1999), Slovenian footballer
- Marjan Gorenc (born 1964), Slovenian ice hockey player
- Stanley Gorenc (born c. 1954), American major general, brother of Frank
