= Stanley Gorenc =

United States Air Force general

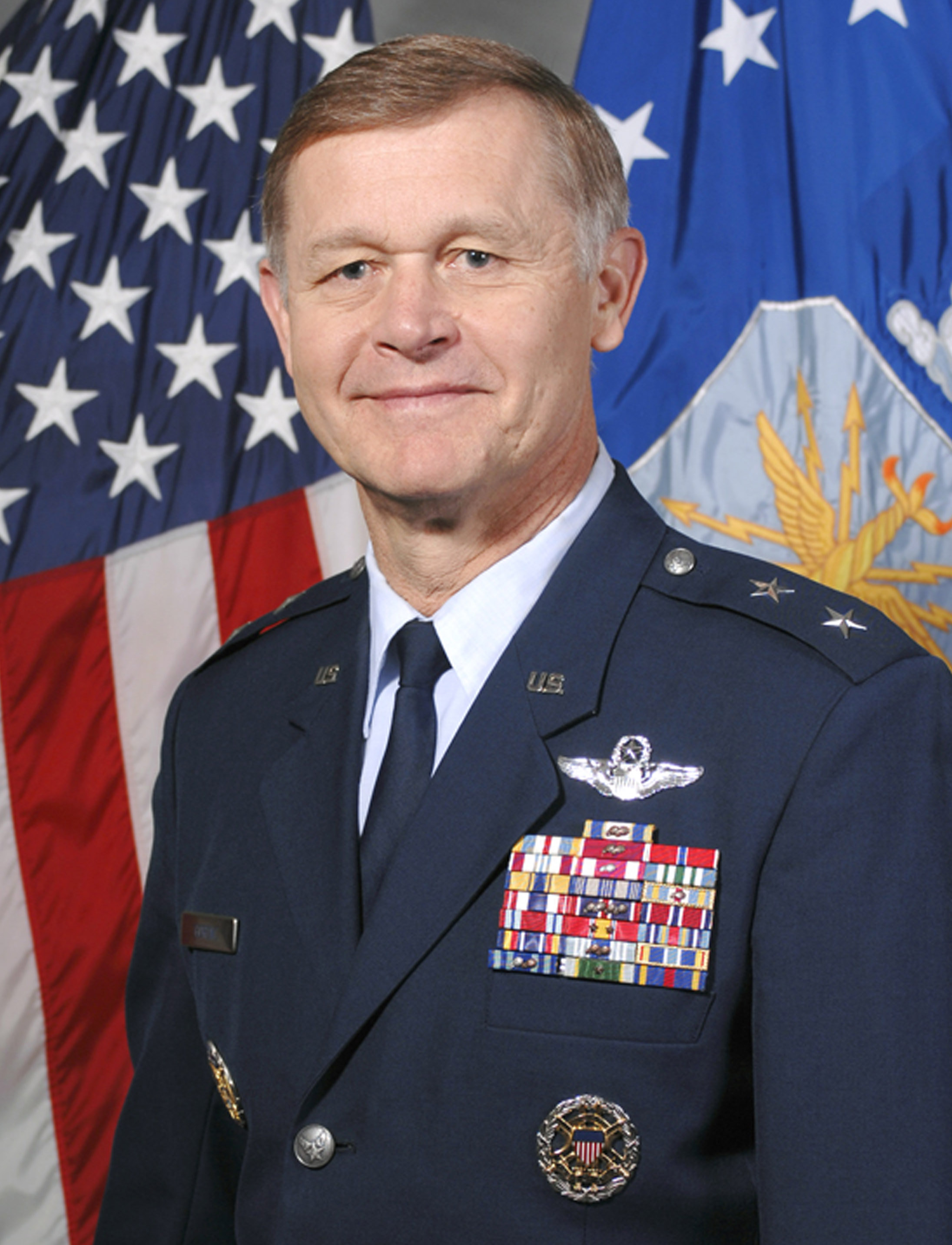
- Major General Stanley Gorenc
- Born: c. 1954; Brezovica, SFR Yugoslavia
- Relatives: General Frank Gorenc (brother)
- Military career
- Allegiance: United States
- Branch: United States Air Force
- Service years: 1975–2007
- Rank: Major general
- Commands: Air Forces Europe; 9th Reconnaissance Wing; 80th Flying Training Wing; 54th Flying Training Squadron
- Awards: Air Force Distinguished Service Medal (3); Defense Superior Service Medal; Legion of Merit (3); Bronze Star Medal

Major General Stanley Gorenc (born c. 1954) is a retired United States Air Force major general who last served as the Air Force Chief of Safety, Headquarters United States Air Force, Washington, D.C., and Commander, Air Force Safety Center, Kirtland Air Force Base, New Mexico. He developed, executed and evaluated all Air Force aviation, ground, weapons, space and system mishap prevention, and nuclear surety programs to preserve combat readiness. Additionally, he was responsible for conducting research to promote safety awareness and mishap prevention, oversaw mishap investigations, evaluated corrective actions, and ensured implementation. Finally, he managed, developed, and directed all Air Force safety and operational risk management education courses.

== Early life ==
Gorenc was born in Brezovica, Yugoslavia, present day Slovenia. Stanley and his younger brother, Frank immigrated with their parents to the United States from the former Yugoslavia in 1962 when they were 8 and 4. After arriving in America, their father worked as a tailor and their mother served as a factory machine operator.

== Military career ==
Gorenc earned his commission in 1975 as a graduate from the United States Air Force Academy. He has commanded a flying training squadron, fighter operations group and three wings: a training wing responsible for the Euro-NATO Joint Jet Pilot Training Program, a reconnaissance wing responsible for the Air Force's entire high-altitude reconnaissance fleet, and, for several months, the 380th Air Expeditionary Wing responsible for conducting combat operations in Southwest Asia. He also commanded United States Air Forces Europe for six months.

Gorenc has served in various operational and staff assignments, including a tour as an exchange officer with the Royal Air Force. Prior to his last assignment, he served as Director, Operational Capability Requirements, Deputy Chief of Staff for Air, Space and Information Operations, Plans and Requirements, Headquarters United States Air Force.

Gorenc retired on July 1, 2007.

== Education ==
1975 Bachelor of Science degree in civil engineering, U.S. Air Force Academy, Colorado Springs, Colorado
1979 Squadron Officer School, Maxwell Air Force Base, Alabama
1985 Air Command and Staff College, by seminar
1986 Royal Air Force Staff College, Royal Air Force Bracknell, England
1988 Master's degree in aeronautical science, Embry-Riddle Aeronautical University, Daytona, Florida
1993 Industrial College of the Armed Forces, Fort Lesley J. McNair, Washington, D.C.
2002 Black Sea Security Program, John F. Kennedy School of Government, Harvard University, Cambridge, Massachusetts
2004 Combined Force Air Component Commander Course, Maxwell Air Force Base, Alabama

== Publications ==
"Dynamic Commitment: Wargaming Projected Forces Against the QDR Defense Strategy," Strategic Forum, National Defense University Press, 1997

== Assignments ==
- July 1975 – August 1976, student, undergraduate pilot training, Columbus Air Force Base, Mississippi
- September 1976 – November 1976, student, fighter lead-in training, Holloman Air Force Base, New Mexico
- December 1976 – June 1977, student, F-4E combat crew training, George Air Force Base, California
- July 1977 – July 1980, F-4E aircraft commander and unit plans and readiness officer, 496th Tactical Squadron, Hahn Air Base, West Germany
- July 1980 – September 1983, T-38 instructor pilot, wing flight examiner and chief, T-38 Air Operations Branch, German air force undergraduate pilot training, later Euro-NATO Joint Jet Pilot Training Program, 80th Flying Training Wing, Sheppard Air Force Base, Texas
- September 1983 – December 1985, Command Flight Examiner, Standardization and Evaluation Division, Headquarters Air Training Command, Randolph Air Force Base, Texas
- December 1985 – December 1986, student, Royal Air Force Staff College, Royal Air Force Bracknell, England
- January 1987 – January 1989, U.S. Air Force and Royal Air Force Officer Exchange Program and air operations staff officer, Headquarters Royal Air Force Support Command, Royal Air Force Brampton, England
- January 1989 – April 1990, chief of Standardization and Evaluation Division, 12th Flying Training Wing, Randolph Air Force Base, Texas
- April 1990 – May 1991, operations officer, 560th Flying Training Squadron, Randolph Air Force Base, Texas
- May 1991 – July 1992, commander of 54th Flying Training Squadron, Reese Air Force Base, Texas
- August 1992 – June 1993, student, Industrial College of the Armed Forces, Fort Lesley J. McNair, Washington, D.C.
- July 1993 – June 1995, deputy commander, later commander, of 56th Operations Group, Luke Air Force Base, Arizona
- July 1995 – November 1997, chief of Studies, Analysis and Gaming Division, J-8, Force Structure, Resources and Assessment Directorate, Joint Staff, Washington, D.C.
- November 1997 – May 1999, commander of 80th Flying Training Wing, Sheppard Air Force Base, Texas
- May 1999 – September 2000, vice commander, Headquarters 5th Air Force, Yokota Air Base, Japan
- September 2000 – March 2003, commander of 9th Reconnaissance Wing, Beale Air Force Base, California (December 2001 – February 2002, Commander, 380th Air Expeditionary Wing, Southwest Asia)
- March 2003 – February 2004, director of plans and programs, Headquarters U. S. Air Forces in Europe, Ramstein Air Base, Germany
- February 2004 – October 2004, commander, Air Forces Europe, Ramstein Air Base, Germany
- October 2004 – July 2006, director of operational capability requirements, Deputy Chief of Staff for Air, Space and Information Operations, Plans and Requirements, Headquarters U.S. Air Force, Washington, D.C.
- July 2006 – 2007, Air Force Chief of Safety, Headquarters U.S. Air Force, Washington, D.C., and Commander, Air Force Safety Center, Kirtland Air Force Base, New Mexico

== Flight information ==
Rating: Command pilot
Flight hours: More than 3,250 hours
Aircraft flown: F-4E, F-15E, F-16, T-37, T-38, U-2, and the British Aerospace Hawk

== Awards and decorations ==
| US Air Force Command Pilot Badge |
| Headquarters Air Force Badge |
| Joint Chiefs of Staff Badge |

| Air Force Distinguished Service Medal with two bronze oak leaf clusters |
| Defense Superior Service Medal |
| Legion of Merit with two bronze oak leaf clusters |
| Bronze Star Medal |
| Defense Meritorious Service Medal |
| Meritorious Service Medal with silver oak leaf cluster |
| Joint Service Commendation Medal |
| Air Force Commendation Medal |
| Air Force Achievement Medal |
| Joint Meritorious Unit Award with bronze oak leaf cluster |
| Air Force Meritorious Unit Award |
| Air Force Outstanding Unit Award with four bronze oak leaf clusters |
| Air Force Organizational Excellence Award |
| Combat Readiness Medal |
| National Defense Service Medal with two bronze service stars |
| Global War on Terrorism Expeditionary Medal |
| Global War on Terrorism Service Medal |
| Air Force Overseas Long Tour Service Ribbon with two bronze oak leaf clusters |
| Air Force Expeditionary Service Ribbon with gold frame |
| Air Force Longevity Service Award with silver and two bronze oak leaf clusters |
| Small Arms Expert Marksmanship Ribbon with bronze service star |
| Air Force Training Ribbon |

=== Other achievements ===
1982 Instructor Pilot of the Year, Air Training Command
Distinguished graduate, pilot instructor training, Sheppard Air Force Base, Texas
Top Crew award, F-4 conversion training, George Air Force Base, California
Chief of Staff Award, Squadron Officer School, Maxwell Air Force Base, Alabama

== Effective dates of promotion ==
Promotions
| Insignia | Rank | Date |
|---|---|---|
| | Major general | February 1, 2004 |
| | Brigadier general | August 1, 2000 |
| | Colonel | February 1, 1994 |
| | Lieutenant colonel | June 1, 1989 |
| | Major | May 1, 1985 |
| | Captain | June 4, 1978 |
| | First lieutenant | June 4, 1977 |
| | Second lieutenant | June 4, 1975 |
