= Jeannie Leavitt =

US Air Force general and first female fighter pilot in USAF

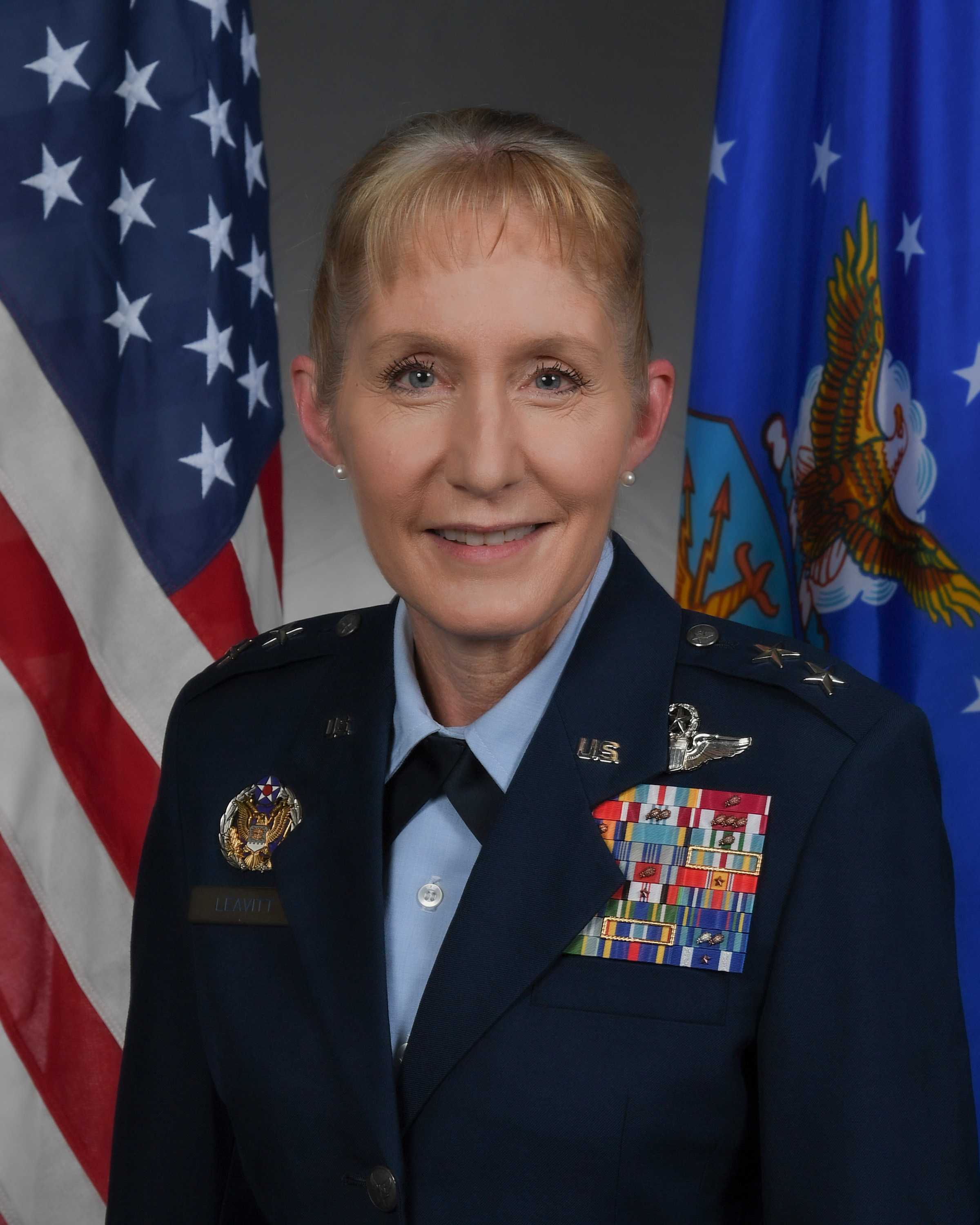
- Born: Jeannie Marie Flynn c. 1967 (age 58–59); St. Louis, Missouri, United States
- Spouse: Colonel Craig Leavitt
- Military career
- Allegiance: United States
- Branch: United States Air Force
- Service years: 1991–2023
- Rank: Major General
- Commands: Air Force Safety Center; Air Force Recruiting Service; 57th Wing; 4th Fighter Wing; 333d Fighter Squadron
- Conflicts: Operation Southern Watch; Operation Northern Watch; War in Afghanistan; Iraq War
- Awards: Air Force Distinguished Service Medal; Defense Superior Service Medal; Legion of Merit (2); Bronze Star Medal

Jeannie Marie Leavitt (née Flynn; born c. 1967) is a retired United States Air Force (USAF) general officer. She became the U.S. Air Force's first female fighter pilot in 1993, and was the first woman to command a USAF combat fighter wing. In April 2021, she was appointed to replace Major General John T. Rauch as Chief of Safety of the United States Air Force, and assumed office on August 13, 2021.

== Early life ==
Leavitt was born in St. Louis, Missouri, to James, who was enlisted in the Air Force, and Pat Flynn. She attended Bishop DuBourg High School, a private Roman Catholic school in St. Louis. After graduating in 1985 and before joining the Air Force, she earned a BS degree in Aerospace Engineering from the University of Texas at Austin and a MS degree in aeronautics and astronautics from Stanford University in California.

== Career ==
Leavitt began her Undergraduate Pilot Training at Laughlin Air Force Base in Texas in 1992. She was being trained as a T-38 instructor pilot at Randolph Air Force Base in San Antonio when restrictions on women flying combat missions were dropped in April 1993. Thereafter she began formal combat training in the McDonnell Douglas F-15E Strike Eagle, becoming the service's first female fighter pilot.

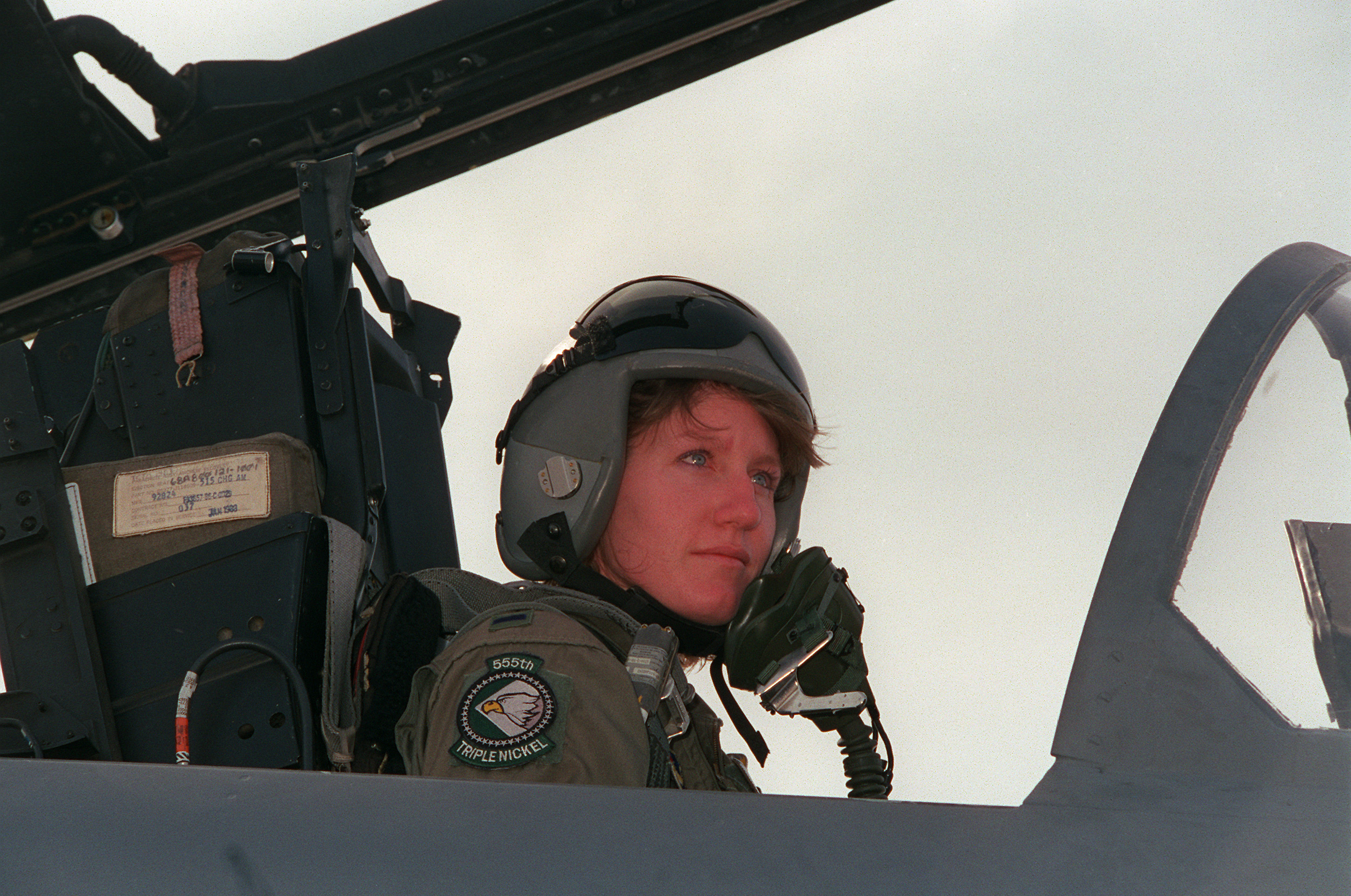
1st Lt. Flynn sitting in the cockpit of a F-15E during her time (1993–94) with the 555th Fighter Squadron

Leavitt's F-15 flight hours have included 300 combat hours, mostly over Afghanistan and Iraq. On one mission, during Operation Southern Watch in 1996, she supported a Royal Air Force Tornado GR1 under threat from an Iraqi Roland surface-to-air missile.

From 2002 to 2010, Leavitt earned three master's degrees; a Master of Business Administration from Auburn University in Alabama (2002), a Master of Military Operational Art and Science from the Air Command and Staff College at Maxwell Air Force Base (2004), and a Master of National Security Strategy from the National War College (2010).

Leavitt's first command was the 333d Fighter Squadron at Seymour Johnson Air Force Base in North Carolina. She was appointed Commander of the 4th Fighter Wing, at the same base in June 2012.

In June 2014, Leavitt relinquished command of the 4th Fighter Wing to become principal military assistant to the Secretary of Defense in Washington, D.C.

In 2016, Leavitt became the first woman to take control of the 57th Wing at Nellis Air Force Base, and was promoted to brigadier general.

In June 2018, Leavitt relinquished command of the 57th Wing to become commander of the Air Force Recruiting Service at Randolph Air Force Base, Joint Base San Antonio, in Texas.

Leavitt assumed the post of Air Force Chief of Safety on August 13, 2021. She retired from the Air Force on September 23, 2023.

Leavitt is a member of the Engineering Advisory Board at the Cockrell School of Engineering, the University of Texas at Austin, and a principal at Pallas Advisors. She also served as a Distinguished National Security Fellow at the Clements Center for National Security at the University of Texas.

On December 8, 2025, Leavitt was appointed as dean of the College of Aviation for the Prescott campus of Embry-Riddle Aeronautical University. She will assume her new role in February 2026.

== Personal ==
Leavitt is married to retired USAF Colonel Craig Leavitt, and they have two children.

== Assignments ==
1. January 1992 – March 1993, student, Undergraduate Pilot Training, Laughlin AFB, Texas.
2. March 1993 – July 1993, T-38 instructor pilot upgrade trainee, Randolph AFB, Texas, later Vance AFB, Oklahoma.
3. July 1993 – April 1994, student, F-15E Formal Training Course, 555th Fighter Squadron, Luke AFB, Arizona.
4. April 1994 – January 1998, instructor pilot, training officer, later Assistant Chief of Weapons, then Assistant Chief of Standardization and Evaluation, 336th Fighter Squadron, Seymour Johnson AFB, North Carolina.
5. January 1998 – July 1998, student, USAF Weapons Instructor Course, F-15E Division, Nellis AFB, Nevada.
6. July 1998 – June 2001, F-15E instructor pilot, Assistant Chief then Chief of Weapons and Tactics, later Flight Commander then Assistant Operations Officer, 391st Fighter Squadron, Mountain Home AFB, Idaho.
7. June 2001 – August 2003, F-15E instructor pilot, Wing Standardization and Evaluation Examiner, 57th Operations Group, later Academics Flight Commander then Assistant Operations Officer for Academics, 17th Weapons Squadron, USAF Weapons School, Nellis AFB, Nevada.
8. August 2003 – July 2004, student, Air Command and Staff College, Maxwell AFB, Alabama.
9. July 2004 – September 2005, Chief of Special Technical Operations, United States Forces Korea, Yongsan Army Garrison, Seoul, South Korea.
10. September 2005 – April 2007, Chief of Master Air Attack Plans, 609th Combat Plans Squadron, Ninth Air Force and United States Central Command Air Forces, Shaw AFB, South Carolina.
11. April 2007 – July 2009, Assistant Director of Operations, 334th Fighter Squadron, later Commander, 333d Fighter Squadron, then Special Assistant to the 4th Operations Group Commander, Seymour Johnson AFB, North Carolina.
12. July 2009 – June 2010, student, National War College, National Defense University, Fort McNair, Washington, D.C.
13. July 2010 – May 2012, CSAF Fellow, Central Intelligence Agency, Washington, D.C.
14. June 2012 – June 2014, Commander, 4th Fighter Wing, Seymour Johnson AFB, North Carolina.
15. June 2014 – April 2016, Principal Military Assistant to the Secretary of Defense, Washington, D.C.
16. April 2016 – June 2018, Commander, 57th Wing, Nellis AFB, Nevada.
17. June 2018 – June 2020, Commander, Air Force Recruiting Service, Joint Base San Antonio-Randolph, Texas.
18. June 2020 – August 2021, Director of Operations and Communications, Headquarters Air Education and Training Command, Joint Base San Antonio-Randolph, Texas.
19. August 2021– September 2023, Department of the Air Force Chief of Safety, Headquarters U.S. Air Force, Arlington, Va., and Commander, Air Force Safety Center, Kirtland AFB, N.M.
20. September 2023, Retired from the Air Force

== Flight information ==
Rating: Command Pilot
Flight hours: More than 3,000, including over 300 combat hours
Aircraft flown: McDonnell Douglas F-15E Strike Eagle, Northrop T-38 Talon, Cessna T-37 Tweet

== Awards and decorations ==
Jeannie Leavitt's major decorations as of June 2020:

Distinguished Service Medal
Defense Superior Service Medal
Legion of Merit with oak leaf cluster
Bronze Star Medal
Defense Meritorious Service Medal with three oak leaf clusters
Meritorious Service Medal with three oak leaf clusters
Air Medal with four oak leaf clusters
Aerial Achievement Medal
Joint Service Commendation Medal with oak leaf cluster
Air Force Commendation Medal
Air Force Achievement Medal

=== Other achievements ===
1997: Outstanding Young Texas Exes, University of Texas at Austin
2009: Katherine and Marjorie Stinson Award, National Aeronautic Association
2018: Omar N. Bradley Spirit of Independence Award
2019: International Aviation Women’s Association, Wings Outstanding Aviator Award
2019: Harvard Business School, Executive Fellow in Executive Education
2019: The University of Texas at Austin, Aerospace Engineering and Engineering Mechanics, Distinguished Alumni

== Promotion dates ==
Promotions
Insignia	Rank	Date
	Major General	September 2, 2019
	Brigadier General	July 3, 2016
	Colonel	October 1, 2009
	Lieutenant Colonel	March 1, 2006
	Major	May 1, 2002
	Captain	July 1, 1995
	First Lieutenant	July 1, 1993
	Second Lieutenant	July 1, 1991

Military offices
Preceded by Christopher M. Short	Commander of the 57th Wing; 2016–2018	Succeeded by Robert Novotny
Preceded by ???	Commander of the Air Force Recruiting Service; 2018–2020	Succeeded by Edward W. Thomas
Preceded by William A. Spangenthal	Director of Operations and Communications of the Air Education and Training Command; 2020–2021	Succeeded by Brenda P. Cartier
Preceded by John T. Rauch Jr.	Chief of Safety of the United States Air Force; 2021–2023	Succeeded by Sean M. Choquette
