= University of Tennessee Air Force ROTC =

Detachment of the US Air Force ROTC

Air Force ROTC Detachment 800
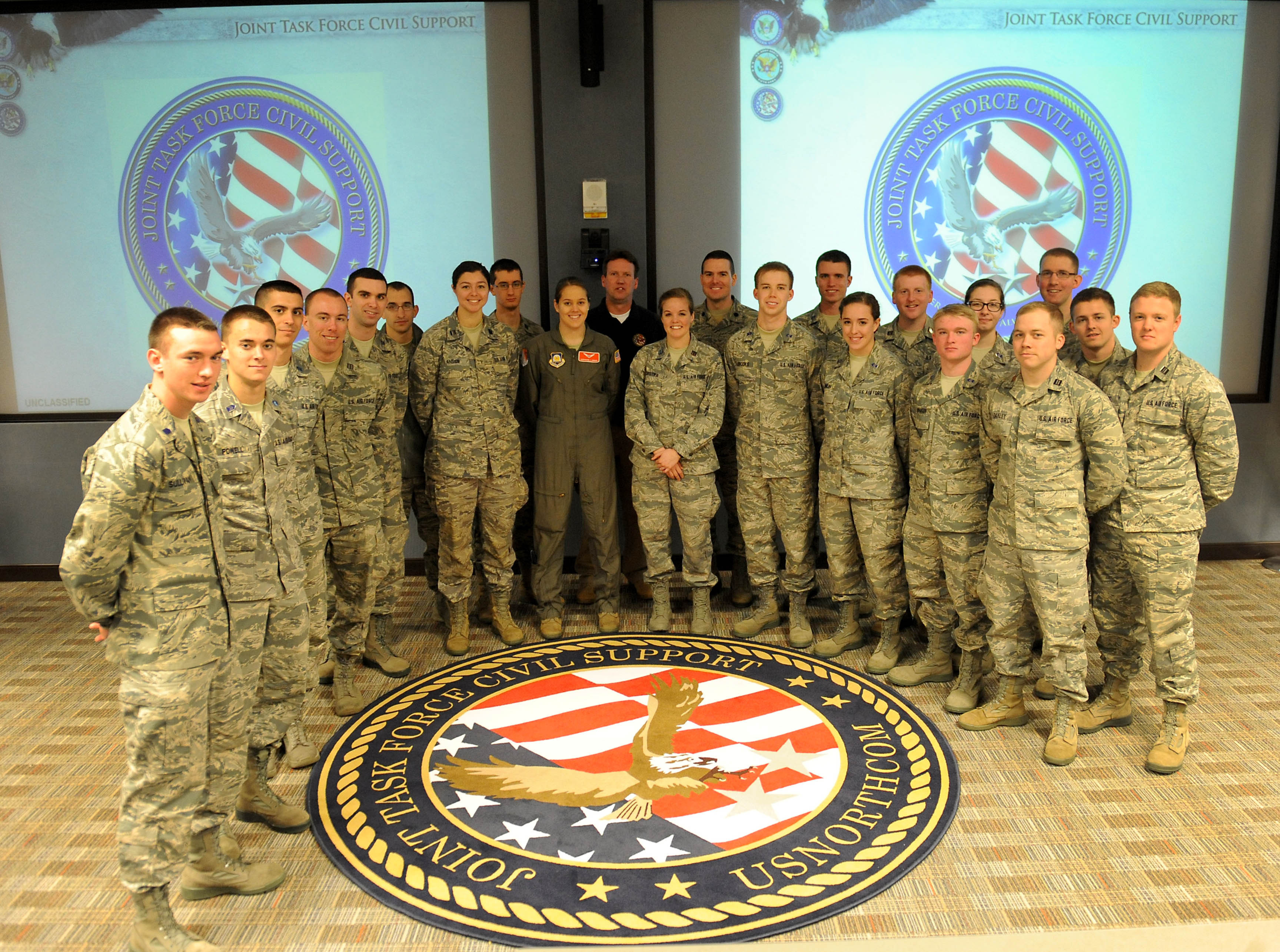
- UT Air Force ROTC cadets receive Joint Task Force – Civil Support mission brief, Fort Eustis, Virginia, in 2014
- Founded: 25 September 1946; (78 years, 8 months); (as UT Army Air Corps ROTC)
- Country: United States
- Branch: United States Air Force
- Type: Reserve Officer Training Corps
- Role: Military education and training
- Part of: Air Education and Training Command; Air University; Air Force ROTC
- Host: University of Tennessee; Knoxville, Tennessee, United States
- Nickname(s): Tennessee Volunteers; Tri-Star Wing
- Colors: UT Orange & White
- Mascot(s): Smokey
- Decorations: Air Force Outstanding Unit Award (2x); Air Force Organizational Excellence Award (6x)
- Website: afrotc.utk.edu

Commanders
- Current commander: Lt Col Damien Johnson
- Notable commanders: Stanley Beck

University of Tennessee Air Force ROTC (officially Air Force ROTC Detachment 800) is a United States Air Force Reserve Officer Training Corps (ROTC) detachment hosted by the University of Tennessee (UT) in Knoxville, Tennessee. The detachment educates UT students enrolled as cadets for service in the officer corps of the Air Force and Space Force. Upon successful completion of the ROTC curriculum and graduation from the university, cadets are commissioned as second lieutenants.

== History ==
=== Background ===
Military instruction at UT predates all other American state universities. In 1844, Professor Albert Miller Lea formed a cadet infantry company at the university. The 1862 Morrill Act required military tactics to be taught, and in 1869 the university was made the state's land-grant institution. In 1916, the National Defense Act formally made this organization into an Army ROTC unit.

=== Army Aviation Cadet Training Program ===
During World War II, the War Manpower Commission requested and UT agreed to host and train 1,200 Army aviation cadets every five months. From the unit's arrival on campus in April 1943 until its departure on June 30, 1944, these cadets and their instructors were organized as the 63rd College Training Detachment (Air Crew). In addition to receiving university instruction in English, geography, history, mathematics, physics, and physical education, the detachment provided cadets with 10 hours of flight training, initially at McGhee Tyson Airport and later at Knoxville Downtown Island Airport, which cadets reached by pulling themselves across the Tennessee River by ferry. The detachment was among the largest in the nation, training a total of 4,000 airmen, and became the "number one program."

=== Army Air Corps ROTC ===
On October 22, 1946, General of the Army Dwight D. Eisenhower, Chief of Staff of the United States Army, signed General Order No. 124 directing the establishment of Army Air Corps ROTC units at UT and 76 other colleges and universities effective at the beginning of the 1946–1947 academic year. These Air ROTC units were initially assigned to Air Training Command; however, a few weeks later, on November 15, 1946, Headquarters Army Air Forces transferred the Air ROTC program from Air Training Command to Air Defense Command. UT's Air ROTC unit was subordinate to Air Defense Command's Fourteenth Air Force, Robins Air Force Base, Georgia.

UT established its Air ROTC unit within the university's existing Military Department alongside its regular Army ROTC unit. The air unit's first commander and the university's first professor of air science and tactics was Major (later Colonel) Frederick Weston Hyde Jr., a West Point alumnus, World War II B-24 Liberator pilot, and former Stalag Luft III prisoner of war.

Classes began on September 25, 1946, with an initial enrollment of 30 cadets. By November 1946, enrollment had grown to 46 cadets. The inaugural class of cadets received training in the history of the Army Air Forces, aircraft, air navigation, engine mechanics, and administration procedures. The following summer, 39 cadets reported to Keesler Army Airfield, Mississippi, for 42 days of field training.

=== Air Force ROTC ===
On September 18, 1947, the Air Force became a separate branch of the United States Armed Forces. On September 26, 1947, the United States Department of Defense transferred all units and personnel of the Army Air Forces, including the Air ROTC program, to the Air Force. The separation of UT's Air Force ROTC unit from the university's Army ROTC unit was completed on July 11, 1949.

As an Air Force ROTC unit, the unit's early enlisted instructors included Master Sergeant (later Major) Joseph N. Peeden, a Flying Tigers veteran.

In October 1951, the unit began operating fully independently of UT's Army ROTC unit. As part of this transition, the unit was restructured similar to an Air Force wing composed of groups and squadrons. In that same month, the unit began sponsoring the Lieutenant General Frank M. Andrews Squadron of the Arnold Air Society.

In early 1952, the unit allowed women to enroll in a class, a first in the history of military instruction at UT.

Effective August 1, 1952, all 188 Air Force ROTC units nationwide became part of Air University and were organized and designated as detachments of Headquarters Air Force ROTC, Maxwell Air Force Base, Alabama. UT's Air Force ROTC unit was designated Detachment 800.

By May 1953, UT separated its Army ROTC and Air Force ROTC programs into their own academic departments; Detachment 800's was named the Department of Air Science and Tactics. By May 1956, the department was renamed the Department of Air Science. By December 1965, the department was renamed the Department of Air Force Aerospace Studies.

In 1963, Detachment 800 began sponsoring the Lieutenant General Frank M. Andrews Chapter of Silver Wings (then known as Angel Flight).

The detachment began enrolling women as cadets during the fall semester of 1970. Vicki Wise was the first woman to join.

In 1988, cadets Shaun Fields, Kerry E. Poole, and Donald W. Smith and student Terri Lynn Papes were killed when their rented single-engine plane crashed into the south bank of the French Broad River near Kodak, Tennessee.

In 2023, Lieutenant Colonel Damien Johnson, a Detachment 800 alumnus, was assigned as the detachment's commander.

== Facilities ==
A shortage of on-campus space following World War II caused UT's Army and Air Force ROTC units to relocate from Section X of Neyland Stadium, which had been built for Military Department use in the 1930s, to temporary barracks. The barracks were supplemented through the temporary use of other campus spaces. In the late 1940s, government inspectors criticized these arrangements, and the Air Force warned UT that it might discontinue the Air Force ROTC program at the university unless better facilities were made available.

In spring 1958, the ROTC units moved into UT's newly built Armory-Fieldhouse. In 1966, the Armory-Fieldhouse was expanded to become William B. Stokely Athletics Center. Detachment 800 remained headquartered in Stokely Athletics Center until the building's closure in 2012.

In 2013, the detachment relocated to the James D. Hoskins Library building.

== Honors ==
In 1949, UT ranked sixth among 113 Air Force ROTC units nationwide and first in the South.

In 1969, Detachment 800 received the Air Force Outstanding Unit Award, at the time the Air Force's highest unit award and the highest award given to an Air Force ROTC detachment. Between 1947 and 1969, only six of the 174 Air Force ROTC detachments nationwide had received the award. The award was presented by Brigadier General B. B. Cassiday Jr., Commandant of Air Force ROTC, at Stokely Athletics Center. General Cassiday said, "It is an uncommon award for uncommon achievement. It requires a performance over an extended period of time that is seldom equalled, and a devotation to duty and to the mission of the Air Force that demonstrates the highest standard of professionalism." UT Chancellor Charles Weaver said the award was "one of the highest honors" ever received by the university.

In 1973, Cadet James D. Markum received the Air Force ROTC Silver Valor Award for aiding the victims of a car accident while traveling to that year's Arnold Air Society national conclave.

In 1981, the detachment's Arnold Air Society squadron won the Hagan Trophy as the most outstanding medium-sized squadron in the nation.

In 2008, Detachment 800 again received the Air Force Outstanding Unit Award for the period beginning July 1, 2005, and ending June 30, 2007.

In 2010, Detachment 800 received the Right of Line Award, honoring it as the best of 56 Air Force ROTC detachments nationwide enrolling between 76 and 150 cadets. The detachment was evaluated in five categories: production of officers, education, recruiting and retention, university and public relations, and cadet activities. The Air Education and Training Command Inspector General lauded the detachment as "one of the best training programs ever seen."

Detachment 800 received the Air Force Organizational Excellence Award in 2010, 2012, 2014, 2016, 2019, and 2021.

== Notable alumni ==
- John A. Bradley, retired lieutenant general and former commander of Air Force Reserve Command
- Stephen A. Clark, retired major general and former director of programs in the office of the Air Force deputy chief of staff for strategic plans and requirements
- Dwight D. Creasy, retired brigadier general and Defense Finance and Accounting Service general counsel
- Gary A. Glandon, Distinguished Flying Cross recipient and F-4 Phantom II weapon systems officer killed in action during the Vietnam War
- Wendell L. Griffin, retired major general and former Air Force chief of safety
- Charles R. "Ron" Henderson, retired major general and former Air Force deputy assistant chief of staff for strategic deterrence and nuclear integration
- William E. Jones, retired major general and former commander of Fourteenth Air Force
- Charles "Brian" McDaniel, brigadier general and Air Force director of weather
- Charles E. Reed Jr., retired major general and former mobilization assistant to the commander of Air Force Reserve Command
- David B. Waldrop III, three-time Silver Star recipient and first American pilot to shoot down two enemy aircraft in a single engagement during the Vietnam War

== See also ==
- Air Force Officer Training School
- Tennessee Air National Guard
- Tennessee Wing Civil Air Patrol
- United States Air Force Academy
