= John T. Rauch =

U.S. Air Force general

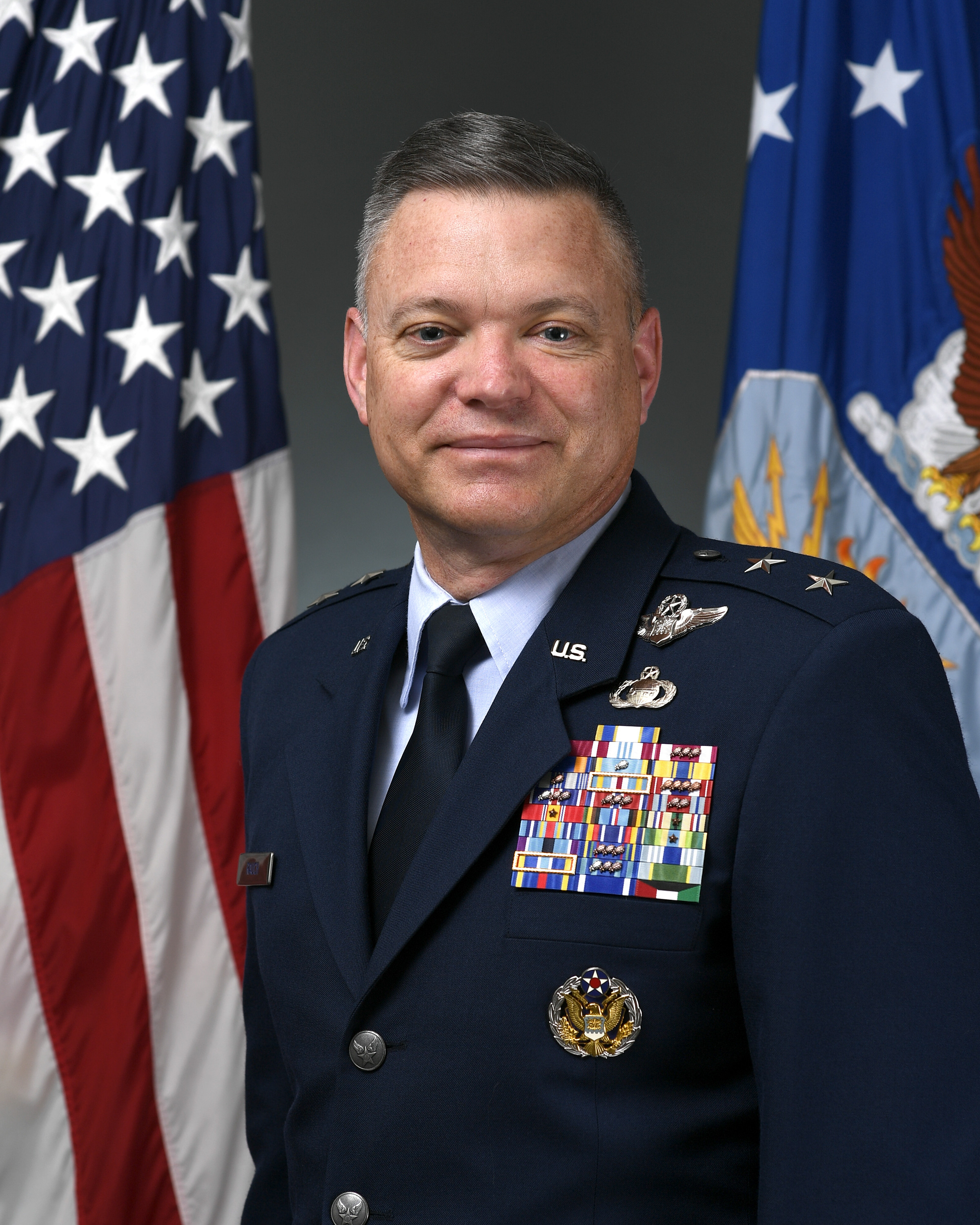
- Official portrait, 2021
- Military career
- Allegiance: United States
- Branch: United States Air Force
- Service years: 1989–2021
- Rank: Major General
- Commands: Air Force Safety Center; 55th Wing; 552nd Air Control Wing; 338th Combat Training Squadron
- Awards: Legion of Merit (2)

John T. Rauch Jr. is a retired United States Air Force major general who served as the chief of safety of the United States Air Force from August 2017 to August 2021. Previously, he was the director of future warfare of the U.S. Air Force.

Military offices
| Preceded by ??? | Commander of the 552nd Air Control Wing; 2010–2012 | Succeeded by Gregory M. Guillot |
| Preceded by Don Bacon | Commander of the 55th Wing; 2012–2013 | Succeeded by Gregory M. Guillot |
| Preceded by ??? | Director of Future Warfare of the United States Air Force; 2017 | Succeeded by Michael L. Downs |
| Preceded by Andrew M. Mueller | Chief of Safety of the United States Air Force and Commander of the Air Force Safety Center; 2017–2021 | Succeeded by Jeannie M. Leavitt |
