= Gregory Feest =

United States Air Force general

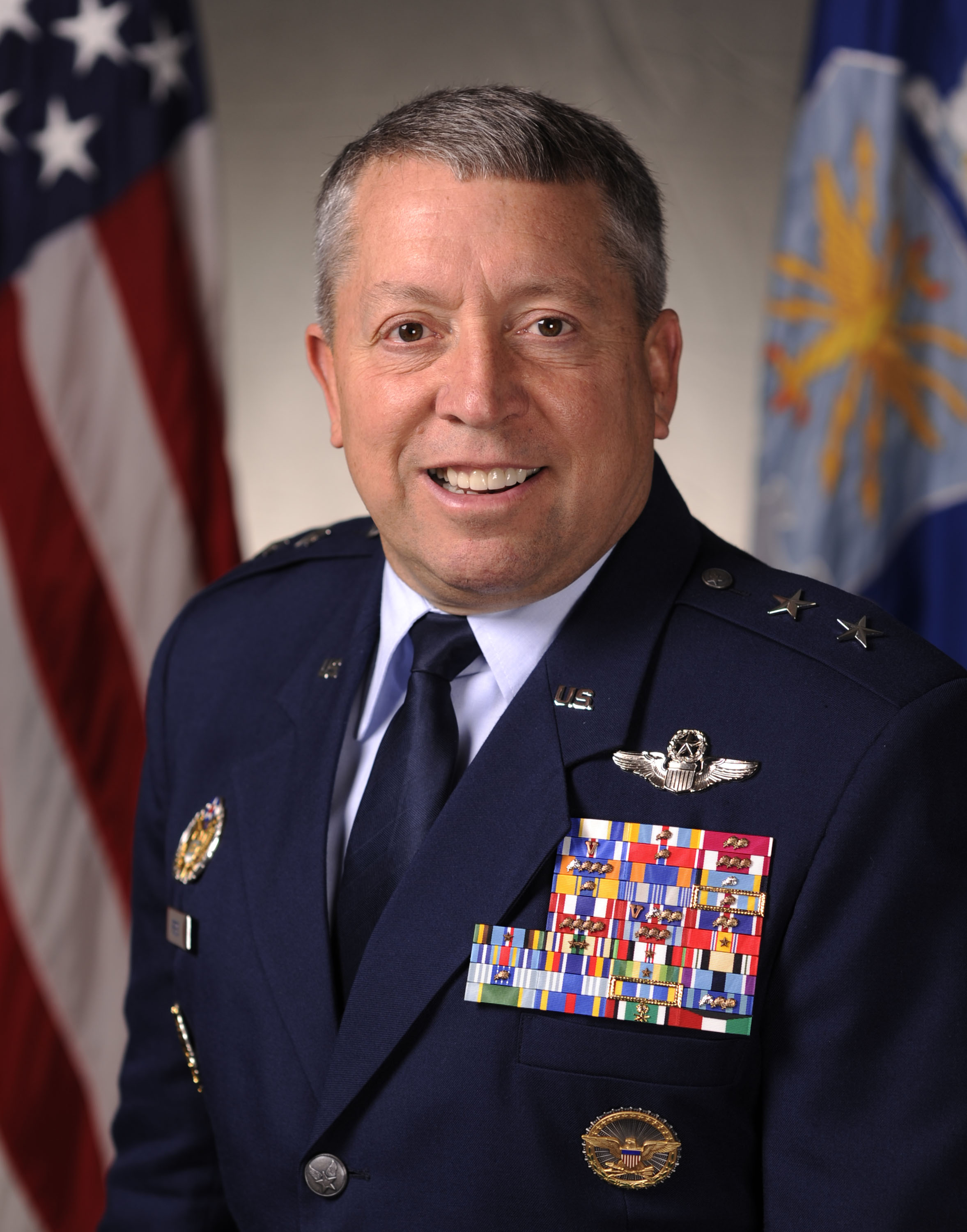
- Major General Gregory A. Feest; Chief of Safety of the United States Air Force
- Born: Gregory A. Feest; 1956 (age 69–70); Racine, Wisconsin, U.S.
- Military career
- Allegiance: United States of America
- Branch: United States Air Force
- Service years: 1978–2012
- Rank: Major general
- Awards: Air Force Distinguished Service Medal; Defense Superior Service Medal (2); Legion of Merit (3); Distinguished Flying Cross; Bronze Star Medal (2); Meritorious Service Medal (4); Air Medal (10); Aerial Achievement Medal (6); Air Force Commendation Medal (2); Air Force Achievement Medal; Combat Readiness Medal (4); National Defense Service Medal (2); Armed Forces Expeditionary Medal (2); Southwest Asia Service Medal (3); Afghanistan Campaign Medal; Iraq Campaign Medal; Global War on Terrorism Expeditionary Medal; Global War on Terrorism Service Medal; Armed Forces Service Medal (2); Kuwait Liberation Medal (Saudi Arabia); Kuwait Liberation Medal (Kuwait)

Gregory A. Feest (born 1956) is a retired United States Air Force (USAF) major general who last served as the Chief of Safety of the United States Air Force, Headquarters USAF, Washington, D.C., and commander of the Air Force Safety Center, Kirtland Air Force Base, New Mexico.

== Early life and education ==
Feest was born in 1956 in Racine, Wisconsin. He attended St. Catherine's High School graduating in 1974. He received his USAF commission through the ROTC program at the University of Wisconsin in 1978.

== Career ==
Feest has held a variety of flying assignments, including command of the operations and maintenance of one of only two operational F-117A Nighthawk stealth fighter squadrons. He has also commanded the 479th Flying Training Group, Moody Air Force Base, Georgia; the 379th Air Expeditionary Wing, Southwest Asia; and 19th Air Force, Randolph AFB, Texas. His staff assignments include USAF liaison officer to the U.S. Senate, senior military assistant to the director of operational test and evaluation in the Office of the Secretary of Defense, and deputy director of requirements at Headquarters Air Combat Command, Langley AFB, Virginia. The general also served as Air Education and Training Command's director of logistics, installations and mission support, as well as deputy director for force application in the Directorate of Force Structure, Resources and Assessment on the Joint Staff. He retired on 1 November 2012. He since has worked at L3 Technologies as vice president of USAF Programs and at Lockheed Martin's Advanced Development Programs (Skunk Works) as deputy director of operations, business, and strategy development and is the executive director for the National Commission on Military Aviation Safety.

He is also recognized for having dropped the first bomb of Operation Desert Storm, flying the F-117A.

=== Assignments ===
- October 1978 – December 1979, student, undergraduate navigator training, Mather Air Force Base, California
- January 1980 – December 1982, F-111E weapons and tactics officer, 20th Tactical Fighter Wing, RAF Upper Heyford, England
- January 1983 – October 1984, student, undergraduate pilot training, Reese AFB, Texas, and student, F-15C Replacement Training Unit, Luke AFB, Arizona
- October 1984 – December 1987, F-15C flight commander, instructor pilot and flight examiner, 27th Tactical Fighter Squadron, Langley AFB, Virginia
- January 1988 – July 1991, F-117A assistant operations officer, flight commander and instructor pilot, 37th Tactical Fighter Wing, Tonopah Test Range, Nevada
- August 1991 – June 1992, student, Air Command and Staff College, Maxwell AFB, Alabama
- June 1992 – June 1994, deputy chief of Senate liaison, Secretary of the Air Force Legislative Liaison, Washington, D.C.
- June 1994 – May 1995, operations officer, 7th Fighter Squadron, Holloman AFB, New Mexico
- May 1995 – June 1997, commander of 9th Fighter Squadron, Holloman AFB, New Mexico
- July 1997 – June 1998, student, National War College, Fort Lesley J. McNair, Washington, D.C.
- June 1998 – June 2000, senior military assistant to the director of operational test and evaluation, Office of the Secretary of Defense, Washington, D.C.
- July 2000 – January 2002, commander, 479th Flying Training Group, Moody AFB, Georgia
- February 2002 – July 2004, deputy director of requirements, Headquarters Air Combat Command, Langley AFB, Virginia
- July 2004 – June 2005, commander of 379th Air Expeditionary Wing, Southwest Asia
- July 2005 – July 2006, deputy director of intelligence and air, space and information operations for flying training, Air Education and Training Command (AETC), Randolph AFB, Texas
- July 2006 – December 2006, director of logistics, installations and mission support, Headquarters AETC, Randolph AFB, Texas
- December 2006 – July 2008, deputy director for force application, Directorate of Force Structure, Resources and Assessment, Joint Staff, the Pentagon, Washington, D.C.
- July 2008 – August 2010, commander of 19th Air Force, Randolph AFB, Texas
- August 2010 – November 2012, Air Force Chief of Safety, Headquarters USAF, Washington, D.C., and Commander, Air Force Safety Center, Kirtland AFB, New Mexico

== Education ==
1978 Bachelor of Business Administration degree in management and finance, University of Wisconsin-Madison
1984 Squadron Officer School, Maxwell Air Force Base, Alabama
1985 MBA in management, Golden Gate University, San Francisco, California
1992 Air Command and Staff College, Maxwell Air Force Base, Alabama
1998 Master of Science in national security strategy, National War College, Fort Lesley J. McNair, Washington, D.C.
2003 National Security Management Course, Syracuse University, N.Y.
2006 Combined Force Air Component Commander Course, Maxwell Air Force Base, Alabama
2010 Joint Flag Officer Warfighting Course, Maxwell Air Force Base, Alabama

== Flight information ==
Rating: Command pilot
Flight hours: 5,500 hours, including more than 800 combat hours earned during operations Just Cause, Desert Storm, Iraqi Freedom and Enduring Freedom.
Aircraft flown: F-111E, AT-38B, T-38C, T-38A, T-6A, A-7D, F-15C, F-15E and F-117A

== Awards and decorations ==
U.S. Air Force Command Pilot Badge
Office of the Secretary of Defense Identification Badge
Office of the Joint Chiefs of Staff Identification Badge
Headquarters Air Force Badge

Air Force Distinguished Service Medal
Defense Superior Service Medal with bronze oak leaf cluster
Legion of Merit with two bronze oak leaf clusters
Distinguished Flying Cross with Valor device
Bronze Star Medal with bronze oak leaf cluster
Meritorious Service Medal with three bronze oak leaf clusters
Air Medal with silver and three bronze oak leaf clusters
Air Medal (Second ribbon necessary for spacing of accouterments)
Aerial Achievement Medal with silver oak leaf cluster
Air Force Commendation Medal with bronze oak leaf cluster
Air Force Achievement Medal
Joint Meritorious Unit Award with two bronze oak leaf clusters
Air Force Meritorious Unit Award with oak leaf cluster
Air Force Outstanding Unit Award with Valor device, silver, and two bronze oak leaf clusters
Air Force Outstanding Unit Award with two bronze oak leaf clusters (Second ribbon necessary for spacing of accouterments)
Air Force Organizational Excellence Award with four bronze oak leaf clusters
Combat Readiness Medal with three bronze oak leaf clusters
National Defense Service Medal with bronze service star
Armed Forces Expeditionary Medal with bronze service star
Southwest Asia Service Medal with two bronze service stars
Afghanistan Campaign Medal with bronze service star
Iraq Campaign Medal
Global War on Terrorism Expeditionary Medal
Global War on Terrorism Service Medal
Armed Forces Service Medal with bronze service star
Humanitarian Service Medal
Air Force Overseas Short Tour Service Ribbon with bronze oak leaf cluster
Air Force Overseas Long Tour Service Ribbon
Air Force Expeditionary Service Ribbon with gold frame
Air Force Longevity Service Award with silver and three bronze oak leaf clusters
Small Arms Expert Marksmanship Ribbon
Air Force Training Ribbon
Kuwait Liberation Medal (Saudi Arabia)
Kuwait Liberation Medal (Kuwait)

== Effective dates of promotion ==
Promotions
Insignia	Rank	Date
	Major general	December 3, 2008
	Brigadier general	October 1, 2005
	Colonel	September 1, 1998
	Lieutenant colonel	March 1, 1994
	Major	July 1, 1989
	Captain	October 13, 1982
	First lieutenant	October 13, 1980
	Second lieutenant	October 13, 1978
