= Chief of Safety of the United States Air Force =

Commanding officer of the U.S. Air Force Safety Center

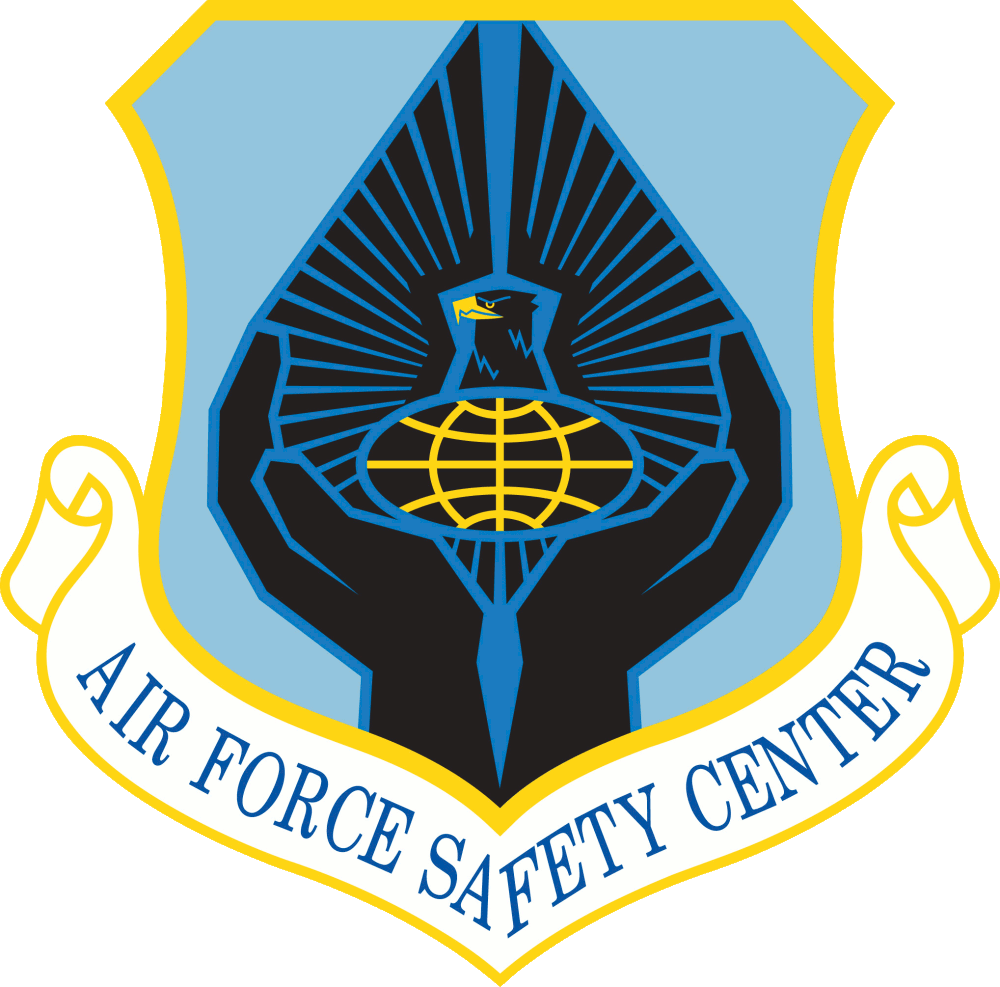

- Flag of an Air Force major general

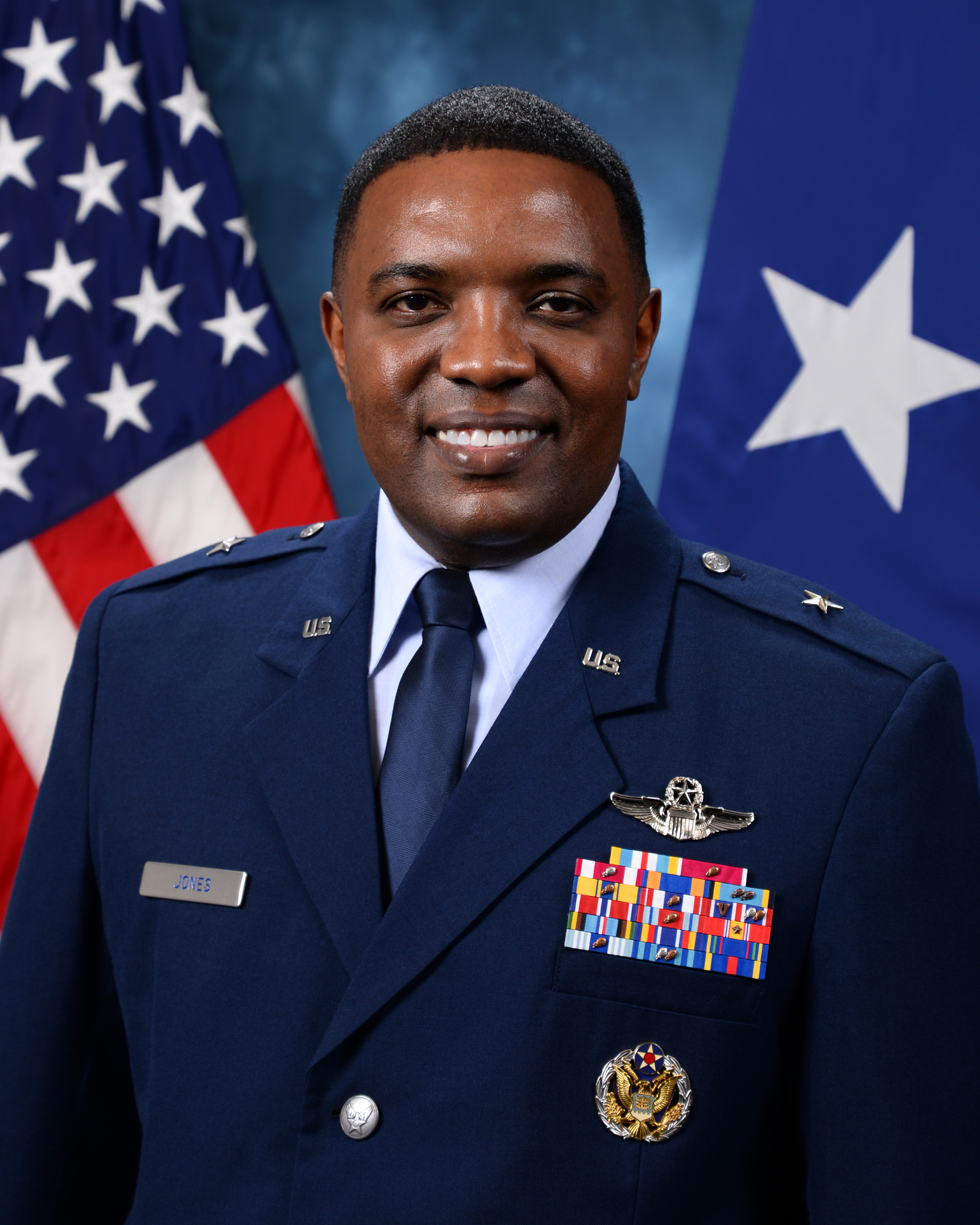
- Incumbent; Brigadier General Otis C. Jones since 28 August 2025
- Formation: 31 December 1971
- Website: Official Website

The Chief of Safety of the United States Air Force is the commanding officer of the U.S. Air Force Safety Center.

== List of Chiefs of Safety of the United States Air Force ==
No.	Name	Photo	Term began	Term ended
1.	Brig Gen James L. Cole, Jr.		May 1991	
2.	Brig Gen Orin L. Godsey		Jan 1996	June 1997
3.	Maj Gen Francis C. Gideon, Jr.		June 1997	June 2000
4.	Maj Gen Timothy A. Peppe		June 2000	30 April 2002
5.	Maj Gen Kenneth W. Hess		1 June 2002	1 July 2004
6.	Maj Gen Maurice L. McFann, Jr.		2 July 2004	27 July 2006
7.	Maj Gen Stanley Gorenc		28 July 2006	1 July 2007
8.	Maj Gen Wendell L. Griffin		30 July 2007	1 January 2009
9.	Maj Gen Frederick F. Roggero		13 January 2009	1 September 2010
10.	Maj Gen Gregory A. Feest		1 September 2010	September 2012
11.	Maj Gen Margaret H. Woodward		September 2012	June 2013
12.	Maj Gen Kurt F. Neubauer		July 2013	July 2015
13.	Maj Gen Andrew M. Mueller		July 2015	August 2017
14.	Maj Gen John T. Rauch		August 2017	13 August 2021
15.	Maj Gen Jeannie M. Leavitt		13 August 2021	4 August 2023
16.	Maj Gen Sean M. Choquette		4 August 2023	28 August 2025
17.	Brig Gen Otis C. Jones		28 August 2025	present

== See also ==
- Chief of Staff of the United States Air Force
- Chief of Chaplains of the United States Air Force
