= Stanley C. Beck =

Retired US Air Force general (born 1929)

- Born: January 21, 1929 (age 97); Gilbert, Arizona, U.S.
- Military career
- Allegiance: United States of America
- Branch: United States Air Force
- Service years: 1954–1983
- Rank: Major general

Stanley C. Beck (born January 21, 1929) is a retired major general in the United States Air Force. He was the vice commander of the Strategic Air Command's 15th Air Force at March Air Force Base, California.

Beck was born at Gilbert, Arizona, in 1929, and graduated from Phoenix Union High School in 1947. He studied for two years at Arizona State University, Tempe, and then entered the U.S. Military Academy at West Point, New York. He graduated in 1954 with a Bachelor of Science degree and a commission as an Air Force second lieutenant. He received a Master of Science degree in public administration from The George Washington University, Washington, D.C., in 1964. He completed Air Command and Staff College, Maxwell Air Force Base, Alabama, in 1964 and the National War College, Fort Lesley J. McNair, Washington, D.C., in 1971.

After graduation from the academy, Beck entered pilot training at Marana, Arizona, and received his pilot wings at Webb Air Force Base, Texas, in August 1955. Assigned to SAC, he served at Forbes Air Force Base, Kansas, until June 1957. After training in KC-135s, he served at Loring Air Force Base, Maine, as a crew commander and squadron operations officer until August 1963.

Following Air Command and Staff College in July 1964, he was assigned to the U.S. Air Force Academy, Colorado, where he served on the commandant's staff as an air officer commanding and as the executive officer for honor and ethics until July 1968. He then trained at Cannon Air Force Base, New Mexico, and Hurlburt Field, Florida, for duty in the Republic of Vietnam as a forward air controller. Beck served as operations officer for the 20th Tactical Air Support Squadron at Da Nang Air Base, Republic of Vietnam, from April 1969 to April 1970. He managed both forward air controller and air liaison officer resources supporting all ground forces of the U.S. Army and the Army, Republic of Vietnam in I Corps.

He completed National War College in 1971 and then served as vice commander, 410th Bombardment Wing, K.I. Sawyer Air Force Base, Michigan. He took command of the 19th Bombardment Wing, Robins Air Force Base, Georgia, in August 1972. Beck was assigned temporary duty at U-Tapao Royal Thai Naval Airfield, Thailand, in December 1972 as commander of the 310th Strategic Wing (Provisional), supporting the Linebacker II operation against North Vietnam. In April 1973 he transferred to Barksdale Air Force Base, Louisiana, where he commanded the 2nd Bombardment Wing. In June 1974 he was assigned to the University of Tennessee, Knoxville, as commander of Detachment 800, U.S. Air Force Reserve Officer Training Corps program, and professor of aerospace studies.

From July 1975 to March 1978, he served as commandant of cadets at the Air Force Academy. He then was assigned as commandant of the Air Command and Staff College. In September 1979 Beck moved to Minot Air Force Base, North Dakota, where he commanded the 57th Air Division, composed of two B-52H bombardment wings, two Minuteman missile wings, a strategic reconnaissance wing and a missile early warning site. During the following year he also became the first commander of SAC's non-nuclear, rapid deployment "Strategic Projection Force." In August 1980 he moved to Andersen Air Force Base, Guam, as commander of the 3rd Air Division where he was responsible for all Strategic Air Command operations in the Western Pacific. He assumed his present duties in August 1982.

He is a command pilot with more than 5,500 flying hours. He flew 114 combat missions in Southeast Asia in OV-10s, 0-2A's, B-52s and KC-135s. His military decorations and awards include the Legion of Merit with oak leaf cluster, Bronze Star Medal, Meritorious Service Medal, Air Medal with four oak leaf clusters, Air Force Commendation Medal with oak leaf cluster, Presidential Unit Citation emblem with oak leaf cluster and Air Force Outstanding Unit Award ribbon.

Beck was promoted to major general January 1, 1981, with date of rank August 1, 1977. He retired on October 1, 1983.
