= Craig A. Franklin =

United States Air Force general

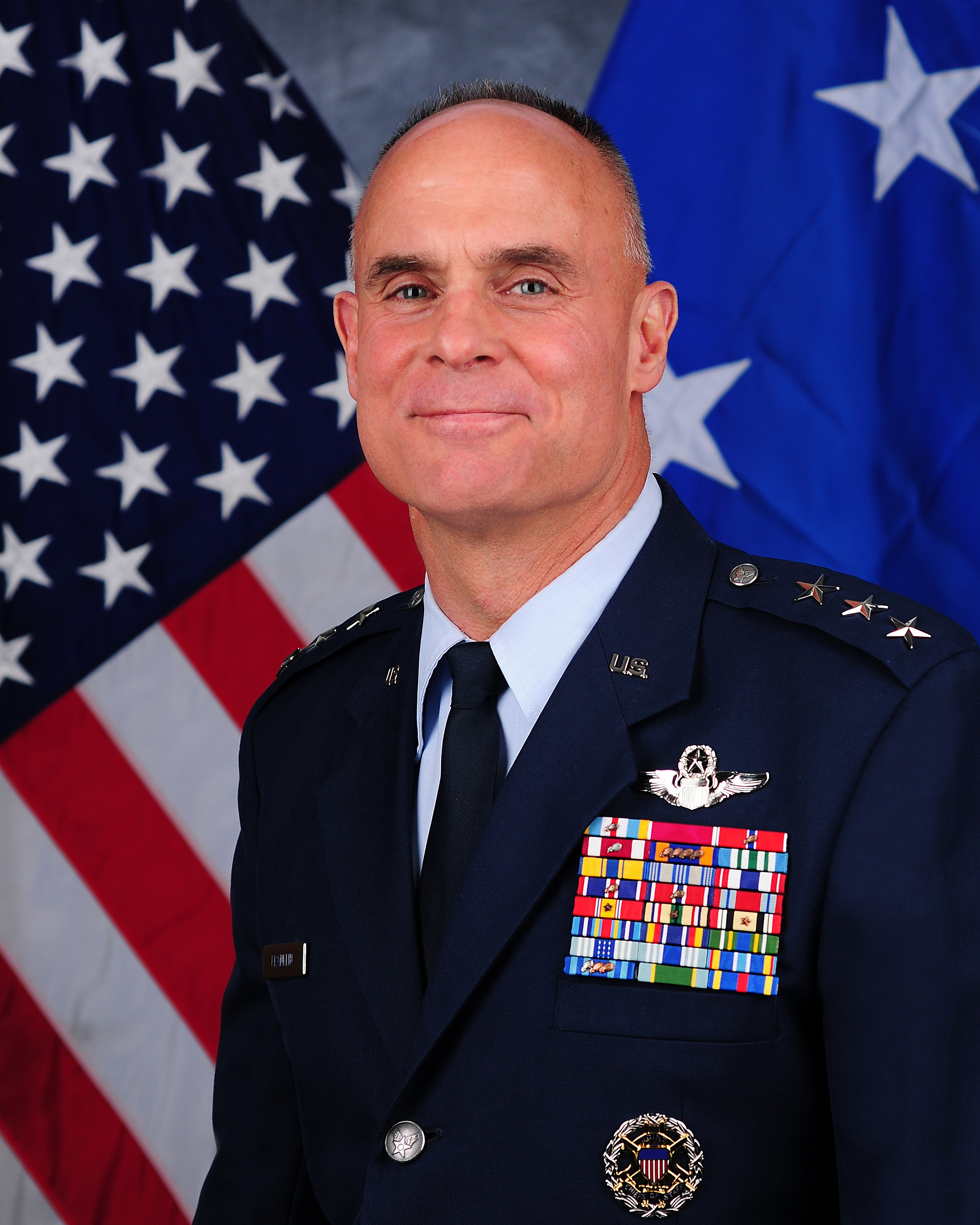
- Then-Lieutenant General Craig A. Franklin
- Military career
- Allegiance: United States
- Branch: United States Air Force
- Service years: 1981–2014
- Rank: Lieutenant General (Retired as Major General)
- Commands: Third Air Force; 53rd Wing; 31st Fighter Wing; 332nd Air Expeditionary Wing
- Conflicts: Iraq War
- Awards: Air Force Distinguished Service Medal; Defense Superior Service Medal (2); Legion of Merit (2); Bronze Star Medal (2)

Craig A. Franklin is a former United States Air Force lieutenant general who last served as the commander of Third Air Force, based at Ramstein Air Base in Germany. A 1981 graduate of the United States Air Force Academy, Franklin served in flying assignments, instructor pilot assignments, as well as multiple staff assignments. Franklin commanded a test and evaluation group and three wings, including the 332nd Air Expeditionary Wing based at Balad Air Base, Iraq.

Franklin submitted his retirement to be effective 31 January 2014. His early retirement resulted in a reduction in retirement rank to the two-star rank of major general. This is as a direct result of Franklin's dismissal of a sexual assault case in February 2013 after the officer in question, a lieutenant colonel, had been found guilty at a court martial in November 2012. The officer was subsequently released from prison and restored to his rank, only to be forced into retirement at a lower rank after the discovery of further sexual misconduct. In a statement Franklin said, "he was retiring 'for the good of this command and the Air Force' because of persistent doubts about his impartiality in overseeing sex-abuse investigations." He officially retired on April 1, 2014.

Military offices
Preceded by Bruce A. Grooms	Vice Director of the Joint Staff; 2010–2012	Succeeded by Nora W. Tyson
Preceded by Frank Gorenc	Commander of the Third Air Force; 2012–2014	Succeeded by Timothy Ray
