= Wendell L. Griffin =

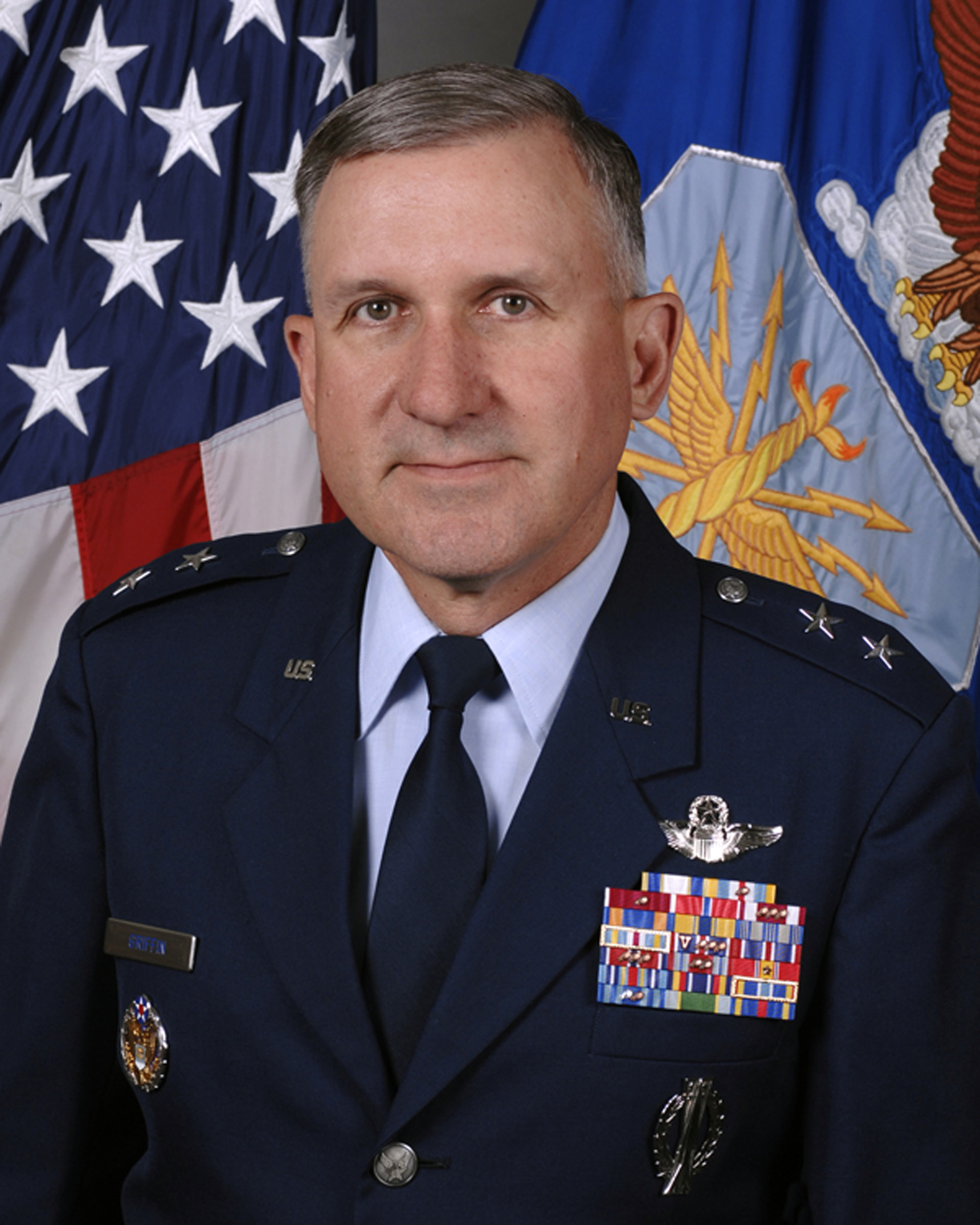
- Major General Wendell Lee Griffin; Chief of Safety of the United States Air Force
- Military career
- Allegiance: United States of America
- Branch: United States Air Force
- Service years: 1974 - 2009
- Rank: Major General

Major General Wendell L. Griffin, USAF, is a retired American Air Force officer who served as the Chief of Safety of the United States Air Force from 2007 to 2009.

Maj. Gen. Griffin is rated Command pilot with 4,200 flight hours minimum flying time. He entered the Air Force in 1976 through the University of Tennessee Air Force ROTC program.

== Awards and recognition ==
His awards and decorations include the Air Force Distinguished Service Medal, the Defense Superior Service Medal with oak leaf cluster and the Legion of Merit with oak leaf cluster. They also include the Bronze Star Medal, the Air Medal, Air Force Commendation Medal, Air Force Achievement Medal, the Air Force Outstanding Unit Award with "V" device and four oak leaf clusters, the Air Force Organizational Excellence Award with four oak leaf clusters, the Combat Readiness Medal with two oak leaf clusters, the National Defense Service Medal with bronze star, the Global War on Terrorism Expeditionary Medal and the Global War on Terrorism Service Medal.
