= Patrick S. Ryder =

U.S. Air Force general and Pentagon Press Secretary

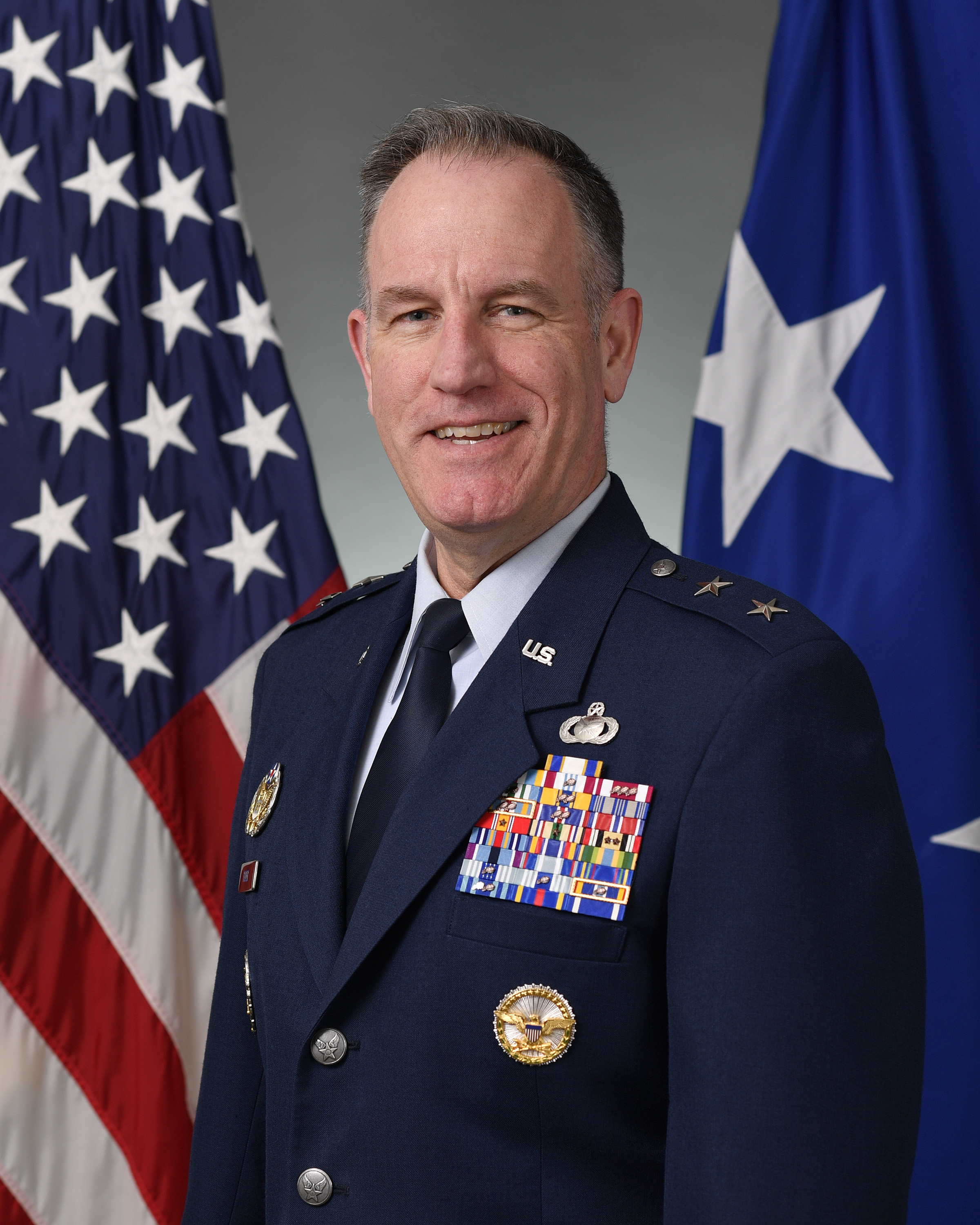
- Official portrait, 2024

Department of Defense Press Secretary
- In office August 4, 2022 – January 20, 2025
- President: Joe Biden
- Preceded by: John Kirby
- Succeeded by: Kingsley Wilson

Personal details
- Spouse: Amy Ryder
- Education: University of Florida (BS); Bowie State University (MA); Joint Military Intelligence College (MS); National Defense University (MS)

Military service
- Branch/service: United States Air Force
- Years of service: 1992–present
- Rank: Major General
- Battles/wars: Yugoslav Wars; Operation Joint Endeavor; Kosovo War; Operation Allied Force; Operation Deliberate Force; Global War on Terror; Iraq War; Operation Enduring Freedom; Operation Inherent Resolve
- Awards: Defense Superior Service Medal (2)

Patrick S. Ryder is an American military officer and United States Air Force major general who served as the Pentagon Press Secretary, appointed August 4, 2022.

He held the post from August 2022 to January 2025 and was the first serving officer in it since Rear Admiral John Kirby in 2015. A public affairs officer since 1992, he was earlier the chief spokesman for United States Central Command, the spokesman for the Chairman of the Joint Chiefs of Staff and the Air Force's director of public affairs

== Air Force career ==
Ryder commissioned through AFROTC from the University of Florida in 1992 and has almost 30 years of service as a communications and public affairs officer.

He was the public affairs officer for the Air Force's first contingent at Taszár Air Base in Hungary during Operation Joint Endeavor in 1995, and he ran the public affairs office of the 48th Fighter Wing at RAF Lakenheath during the 1999 Kosovo air campaign. He was a strategic communications planner for the Coalition Provisional Authority in Baghdad from March to July 2004, a press officer in the Office of the Assistant Secretary of Defense for Public Affairs from 2006 to 2009, and director of public affairs for the Office of the Defense Representative to Pakistan in Islamabad from 2009 to 2010, where he handled publicity for the American military relief effort after the 2010 Pakistan floods. From 2013 to 2016 he was director of public affairs at United States Central Command under General Lloyd Austin, where from 2014 he oversaw the command's public affairs for Operation Inherent Resolve, and from 2017 to 2019 he was special assistant for public affairs to the Chairman of the Joint Chiefs of Staff and the Joint Staff's spokesman. In May 2020 he became director of public affairs for the Office of the Secretary of the Air Force, and he was promoted to brigadier general that August.

== Pentagon press secretary ==
Austin, by then Secretary of Defense, named Ryder Pentagon press secretary on August 4, 2022. The post had been empty since Kirby left for the National Security Council in May, and Ryder was the first uniformed officer to hold it since Kirby, whom Secretary Ash Carter had replaced with a civilian in 2015.

In March 2023, Ryder was nominated for promotion to major general. On 5 December 2023, he was promoted to that position. Kirby had likewise received a second star soon after taking the post in 2013, and few public affairs officers reach two-star rank. The nomination was among more than 400 military promotions that Senator Tommy Tuberville held up for nearly ten months in protest at the Pentagon's policy on travel for abortion services. The Senate confirmed them on December 5, 2023, and Ryder was promoted to major general the same day.

On January 5, 2024, Ryder announced that Austin had been in Walter Reed National Military Medical Center since January 1 with complications from an elective procedure. It was the department's first acknowledgement of the admission, and the Pentagon Press Association, in a letter to Ryder and Assistant Secretary of Defense for Public Affairs Chris Meagher, called the late Friday disclosure an outrage. Ryder told reporters on January 8 that he had learned of the hospitalization on January 2 and had not mentioned it at a briefing two days later. He said he should have pressed for an earlier public acknowledgement and apologized to the press corps.

Ryder left the post in January 2025 at the end of the Biden administration.

== List of promotion, awards and decorations ==
Promotions
Second Lieutenant 2 May 1992
First Lieutenant 8 September 1994
Captain 8 September 1996
Major 1 March 2003
Lieutenant Colonel 1 March 2008
Colonel 1 June 2014
Brigadier General 5 August 2020
Major General 5 December 2023

Awards and decorations
Air Force Distinguished Service Medal
Defense Distinguished Service Medal
Meritorious Service Medal
Joint Service Commendation Medal
Air Force Commendation Medal
Air Force Achievement Medal

Identification badges
Office of the Secretary of Defense Identification Badge
Office of the Joint Chiefs of Staff Identification Badge
Headquarters Air Force Badge

Military offices
Preceded by Edward W. Thomas Jr.	Director of Public Affairs of the United States Air Force; 2020–2022	Succeeded by Jerry Renne
Political offices
Preceded by John Kirby	Pentagon Press Secretary; 2022–2025	Succeeded by Kingsley Wilson
