= Edward W. Thomas =

U.S. Air Force general

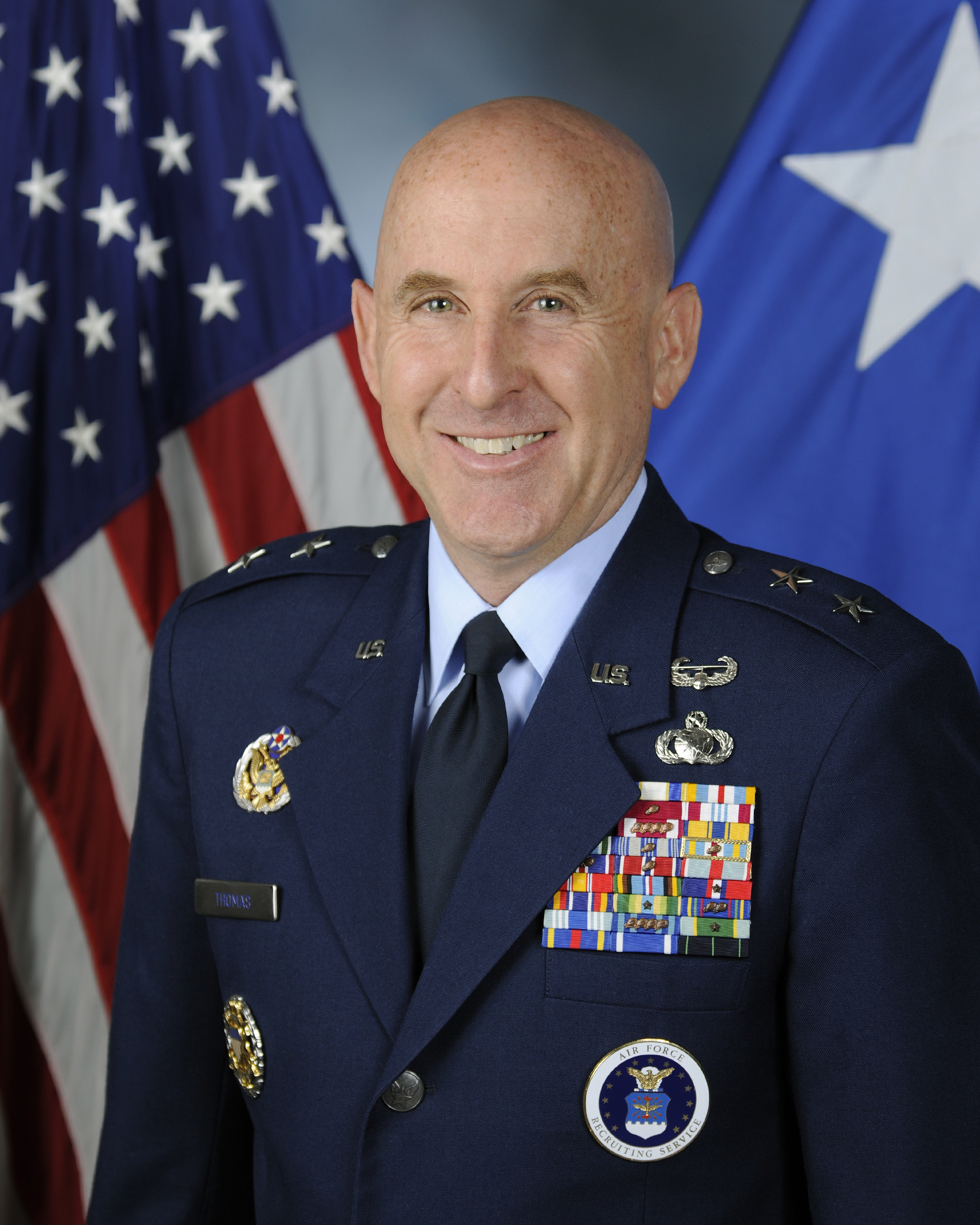
- Military career
- Allegiance: United States
- Branch: United States Air Force
- Service years: 1990–2023
- Rank: Major General
- Commands: Air Force Recruiting Service; Thomas N. Barnes Center for Enlisted Education; 673rd Mission Support Group; 341st Mission Support Squadron
- Awards: Air Force Distinguished Service Medal; Defense Superior Service Medal; Legion of Merit (2)

Edward W. Thomas Jr. is a retired United States Air Force major general and the current Chief Executive Officer of Air Force Aid Society (AFAS), the official nonprofit of the U.S. Air Force and U.S. Space Force dedicated to providing emergency financial assistance, education support, community programs and disaster relief to Airmen, Guardians and their families. Prior to his role at AFAS, he served as the Commander of the Air Force Recruiting Service and previously served as the Director of Public Affairs of the Air Force.

Military offices
Preceded by Kathleen A. Cook	Director of Public Affairs of the United States Air Force; 2016–2020	Succeeded by Patrick S. Ryder
Preceded by Jeannie Leavitt	Commander of the Air Force Recruiting Service; 2020–2023	Succeeded by Christopher R. Amrhein
