= Air Force Aid Society =

American charitable organization

- Founder: Henry H. Arnold
- Type: Public charity
- Headquarters: Arlington, Virginia
- Region served: Global
- Key people: Edward W. Thomas Jr (CEO)
- Revenue: $20m
- Endowment: $250m
- Employees: 38
- Website: afas.org

Air Force Aid Society (AFAS) is a non-profit, charitable organization an official charity of the United States Air Force. The AFAS provides various assistance programs for Air Force and Space Force Airmen, Guardians and their families worldwide. These include interest-free loans and grants for short-term or emergencies, Education Grant Program and community enhancement programs. It also provides a Spouse Tuition Assistance Program (STAP). Thanks to investment income and operational leverage, each $1 of donations from airmen is complemented by $2 from other sources.

In 2023 there were 38 staff members.

AFAS is one of the four official charities supported through the Department of the Air Force’s annual Air Force Assistance Fund campaign.

== History ==
The Air Force Aid Society was founded in 1942 and is headquartered in Arlington, Virginia. The AFAS created the Budget Builder App to help Airman and their families to budget and save money monthly was launched in March 2018. In January 2020, the app was updated to provide customizable budgeting features and a more enhanced expense tracker.

In 2018, the Falcon Loan, created to complement the AFAS Standard Assistance program was increased to a max amount of $1000 for a term of 12 months.

In May 2021, the AFAS began providing assistance to all Airman and Guardians and not only those on an active-duty service.

In 2024, the AFAS provided $4.9 million in emergency financial aid and over $200,000 for child care support.

AFAS provided over $14 million in direct assistance in 2024. This assistance benefited more than 15,500 Airmen, Guardians and their families. The assistance took the form of emergency aid, educational support, community programming and disaster relief.

Major General Edward W. Thomas Jr took on the roll of Chief Executive Officer of AFAS in February 2024.

Since June 2025, AFAS expanded the range of assistance it provides to include mental health services and adoption-related expenses, in addition to immigration-related expenditures.

The AFAS also announced changes to two of its child care programs, Give Parents a Break and Child Care for permanent change-of-station (PCS) as well as merging its loan and non-repayable grant programs.

In December 2025, the organization formally announced the transition in its name to the Air & Space Forces Aid Society (AFAS).
