= Brezovica pri Trebelnem =

- Location in Slovenia
- Coordinates: 45°55′30.21″N 15°7′45.06″E
- Country: Slovenia
- Traditional region: Lower Carniola
- Statistical region: Southeast Slovenia
- Municipality: Mokronog-Trebelno

Area
  - Total: 1.63 km^{2} (0.63 sq mi)
- Elevation: 413.9 m (1,358 ft)

Population (2002)
  - Total: 15

Brezovica pri Trebelnem (pronounced [ˈbɾéːzɔʋitsa pɾi tɾɛˈbéːu̯nɛm]) is a small settlement in the Municipality of Mokronog-Trebelno in southeastern Slovenia. It lies in the hills south of Mokronog. The area is part of the historical region of Lower Carniola. The municipality is now included in the Southeast Slovenia Statistical Region.

== Name ==
The name of the settlement was changed from Brezovica to Brezovica pri Trebelnem in 1953.

== Church ==
The local church in the settlement is dedicated to Saint Anne and belongs to the Parish of Mokronog. It was first mentioned in written documents dating to 1526 and was restyled in the Baroque in the mid-18th century. The main altar dates to 1776.
