= Frank Gorenc =

United States Air Force general

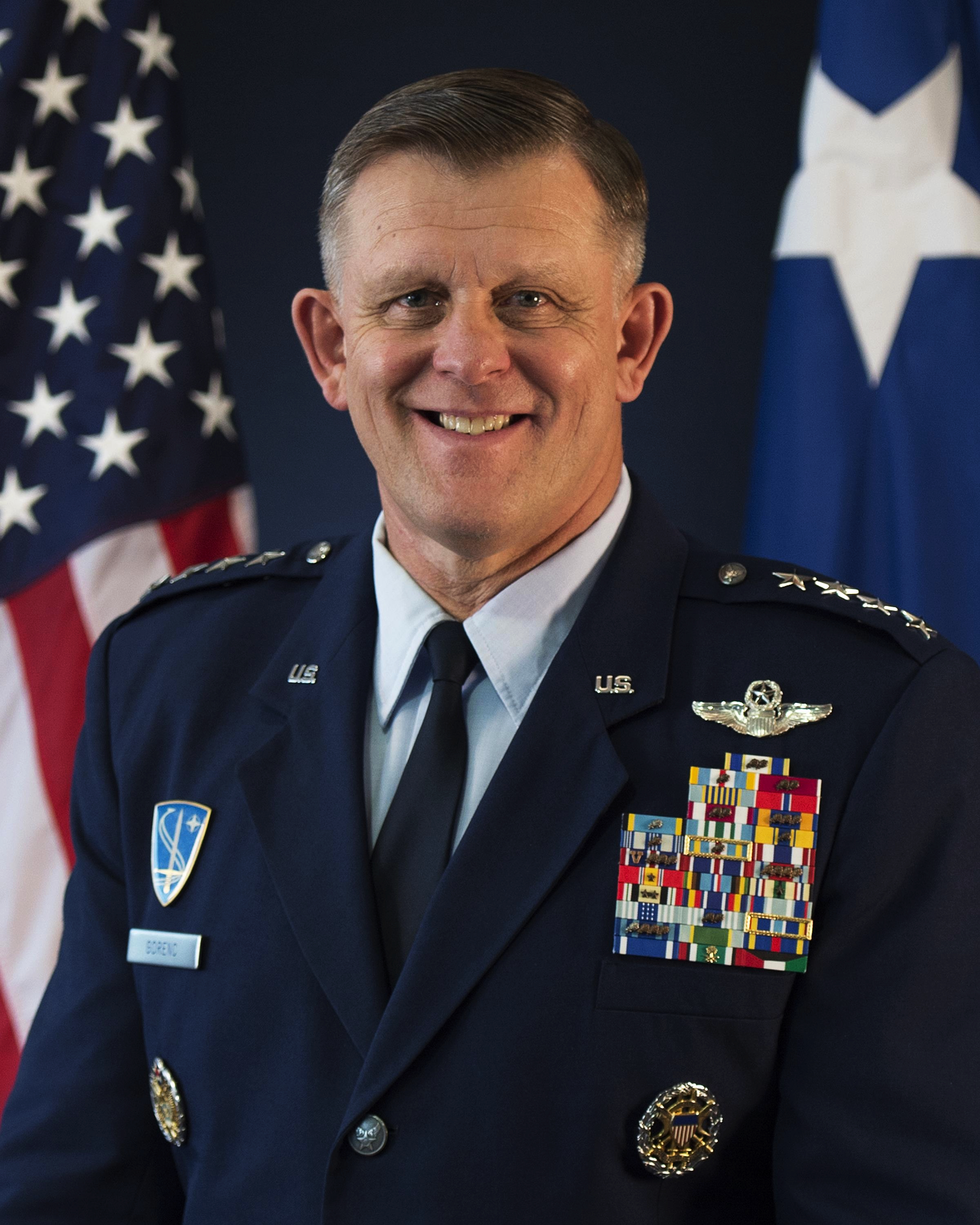
- Born: 14 October 1957 (age 69); Ljubljana, Yugoslavia
- Relatives: Major General Stanley Gorenc (brother)
- Military career
- Allegiance: United States
- Branch: United States Air Force
- Service years: 1979–2016
- Rank: General
- Nickname: "Gork"
- Commands: United States Air Forces in Europe – Air Forces Africa; Allied Air Command; Third Air Force; Air Force District of Washington; 332nd Air Expeditionary Wing; 1st Fighter Wing; 18th Operations Group; 390th Fighter Squadron
- Conflicts: Gulf War; War in Afghanistan
- Awards: Defense Distinguished Service Medal; Air Force Distinguished Service Medal (3); Defense Superior Service Medal (2); Legion of Merit (3); Airman's Medal; Bronze Star Medal

Frank Gorenc (born 14 October 1957) is a retired United States Air Force four-star general who served as the Commander, United States Air Forces in Europe – Air Forces Africa and Commander, Allied Air Command. He previously served as the Assistant Vice Chief of Staff and Director, Air Staff, Headquarters, United States Air Force at the Pentagon. Gorenc is a command pilot with more than 4,100 flight hours in the T-38A, F-15C, MQ-1B, UH-1N and C-21A. He assumed his final assignment on 2 August 2013.

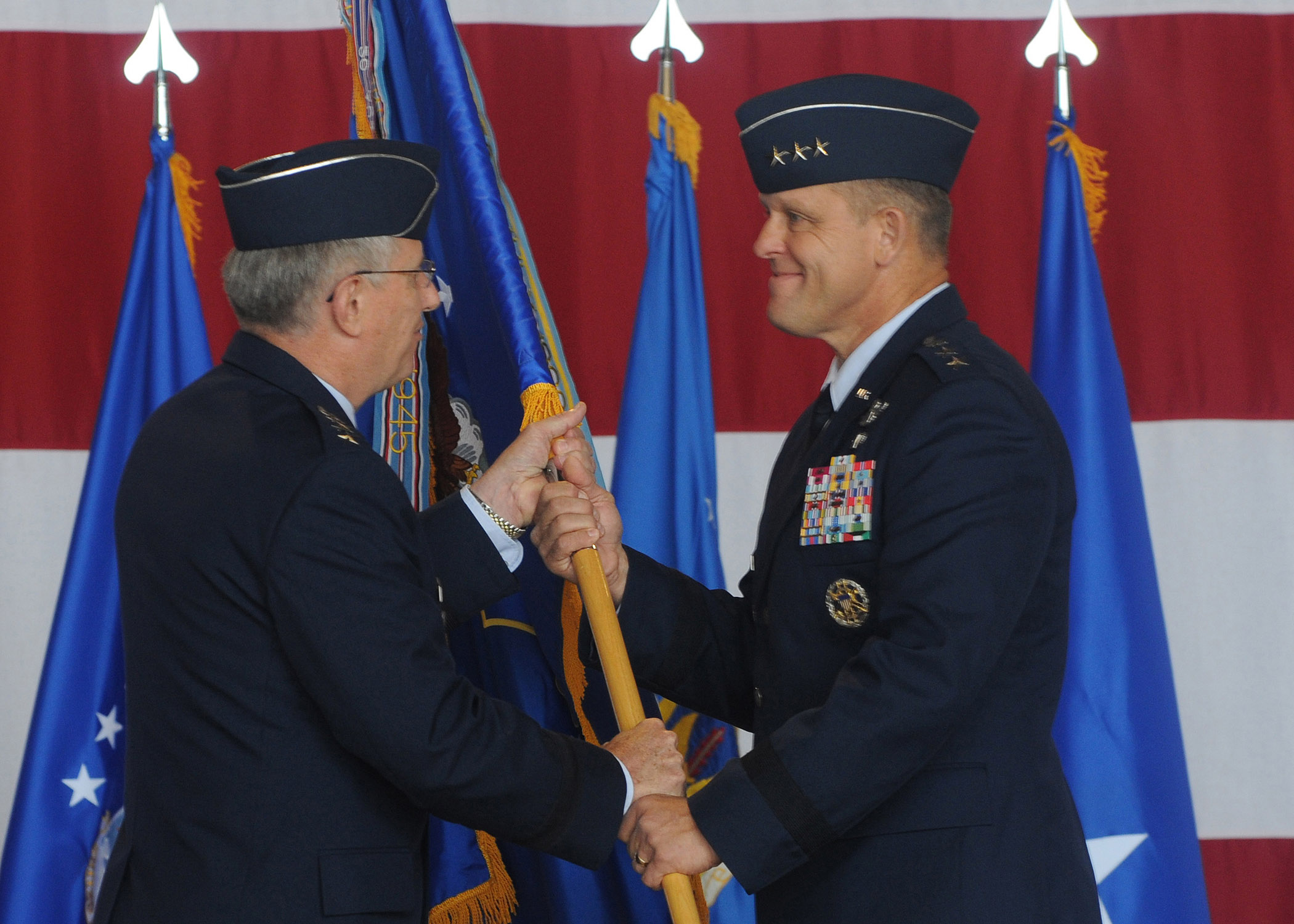
Gorenc assuming command of 3rd Air Force in 2009.

== Early life ==
Gorenc was born in Ljubljana, Yugoslavia, present day Slovenia. Frank and his older brother, Stanley immigrated with their parents to the United States from the former Yugoslavia in 1962 when they were 8 and 4. After arriving in America, their father worked as a tailor, and their mother served as a factory machine operator. Gorenc said that he was required to go to summer school each year simply because the opportunity for education existed and was available. "We didn't know the language," Frank said. "We didn't know the culture, and we came to learn (that) the United States is truly a land of opportunity." Frank went to visit his older brother, then a freshman cadet, during Parents' Weekend at the U.S. Air Force Academy, and there he developed his first interest in the Air Force. "As a freshman in high school walking on the academy campus, you couldn't help but be inspired," the younger brother said. Coming from a lower-middle-class background, the opportunities seemed boundless.

== Military career ==
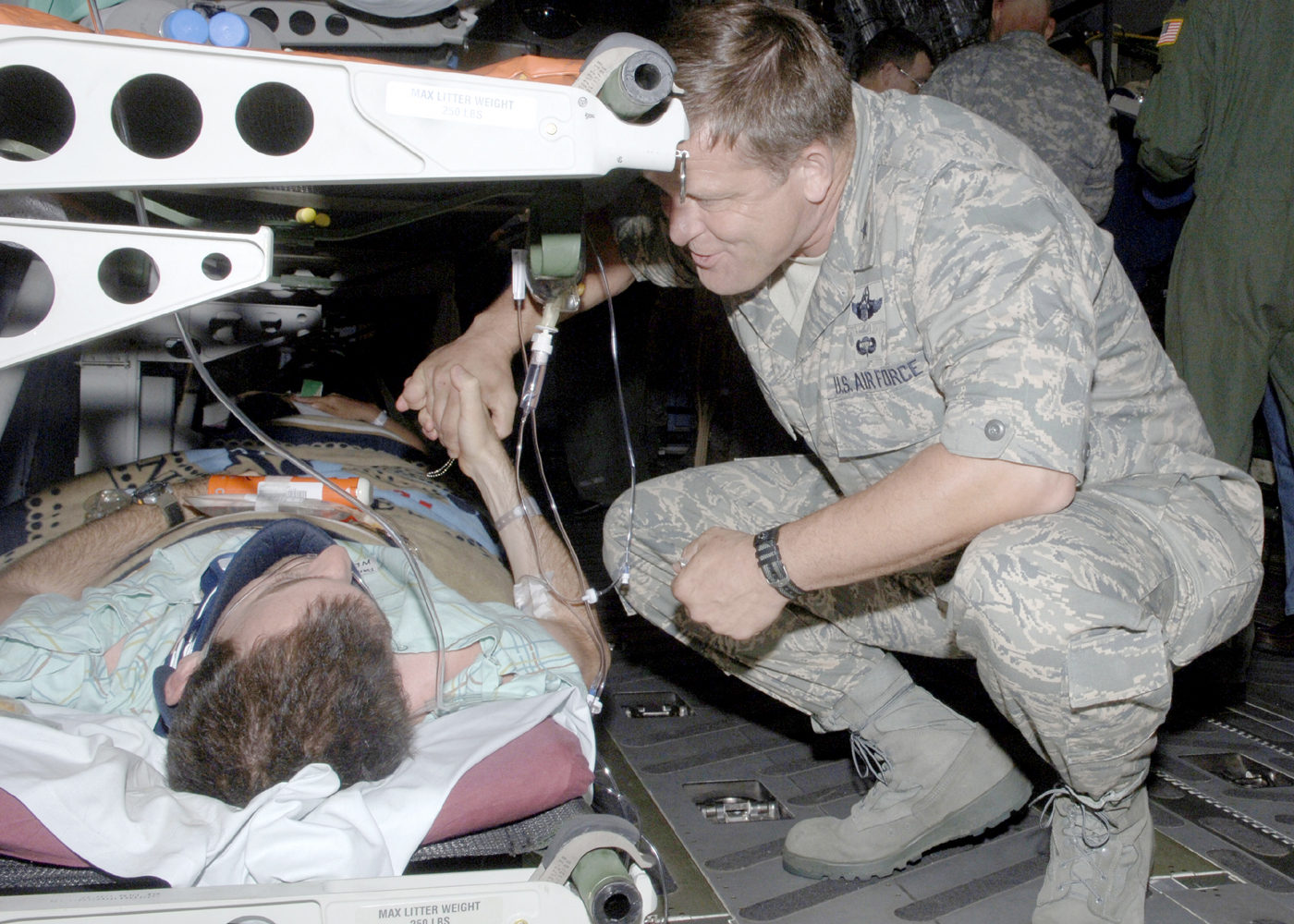
Gorenc, thanks an injured service member for his service.

Gorenc earned his commission in 1979 as a distinguished graduate from the United States Air Force Academy. He has commanded a fighter squadron, an operations group, two wings and the Air Force District of Washington. Gorenc has served in numerous positions at Air Combat Command, in the Pentagon on the Air Staff and The Joint Staff, and at Supreme Headquarters Allied Powers Europe as the special assistant to the Commander USEUCOM/SACEUR. Prior to assuming his current position, he was the director of air and space operations, Air Combat Command, Langley Air Force Base, Virginia.

As a brigadier general, Gorenc was the director of operational plans and joint matters, deputy chief of staff for air, space and information operations, plans and requirements at the Headquarters U.S. Air Force, Washington, D.C. He was responsible for developing and integrating operational strategies, organization concepts, policies and plans supporting aerospace power employment. The General's six divisions orchestrated Air Force participation in joint and regional war and mobilization planning communities, as well as operator and warfighter talks with allies and sister services. He oversaw the Air Force's concept of operations development as well as its interface with Joint Staff and National Security Council issues. Prior to assuming this position, he was commander of 332nd Air Expeditionary Wing, Balad Air Base, Iraq.

Gorenc served as the commander of Third Air Force, Ramstein Air Base, Germany. As the U.S. Air Forces in Europe component numbered air force for U.S. European Command, 3rd Air Force supports the USAFE and EUCOM commanders both at the operational and tactical level directing all USAFE forces engaged in contingency and wartime operations in the EUCOM area of responsibility. Third Air Force includes the headquarters Air Force forces staff, a multidisciplinary, professional cadre responsible for planning, deploying, employing, sustaining and redeploying Air Force forces as the supported and supporting air component of USAFE to EUCOM. Other 3rd Air Force units include the 603rd Air and Space Operations Center, 10 USAFE wings and two stand-alone groups. Gorenc relinquished command of 3rd Air Force to Lt. Gen. Craig A. Franklin, 30 March 2012.

In April 2012, was appointed the assistant vice chief of staff and director of air staff, Headquarters United States Air Force at the Pentagon.

== Education ==
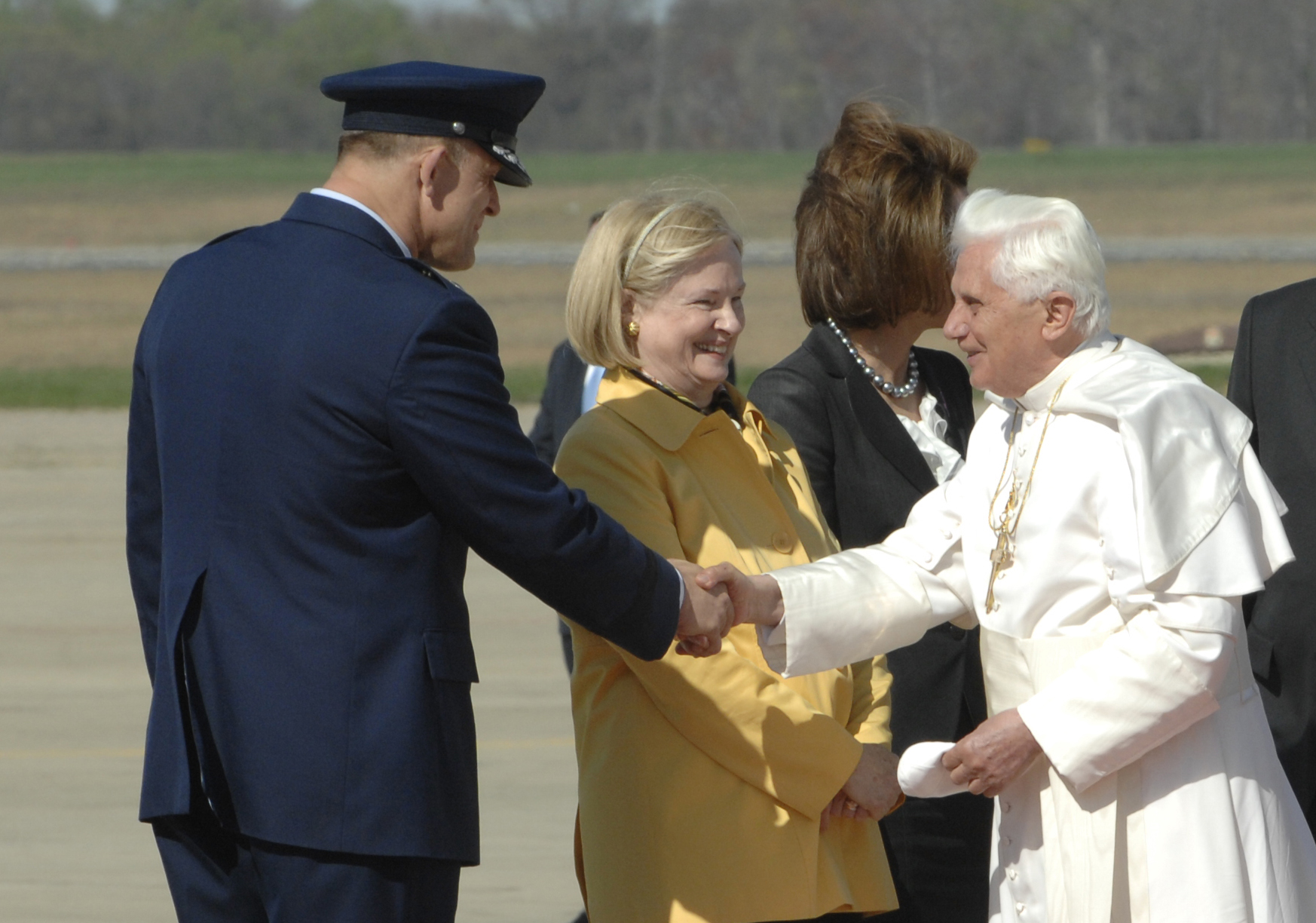
Maj Gen Frank Gorenc, Commander, Air Force District of Washington, greets Pope Benedict XVI upon his arrival at Andrews Air Force Base, Md.

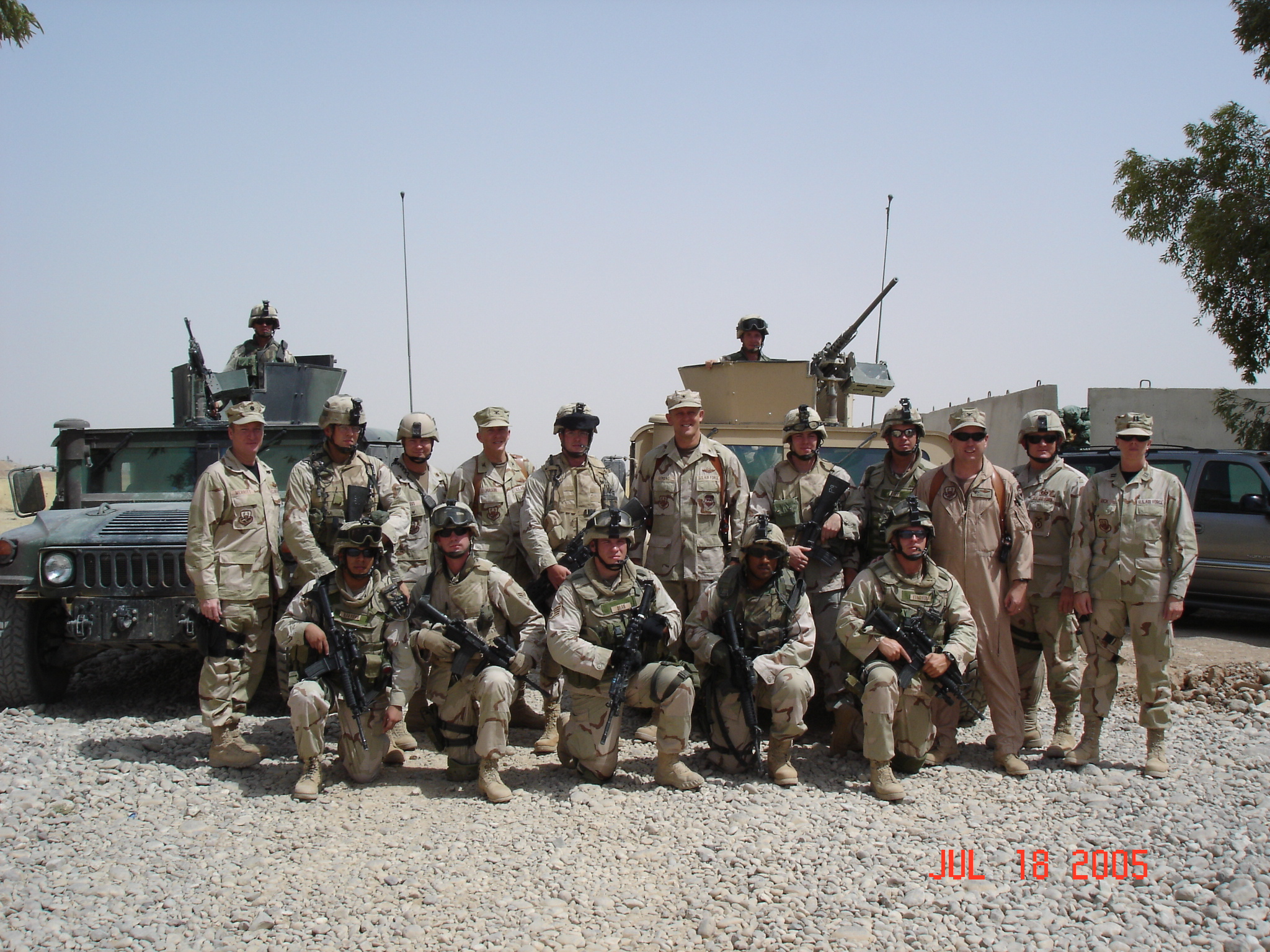
Brigadier General Frank Gorenc with his protection force in Balad, Iraq

1979 Distinguished graduate, Bachelor of Science degree in civil engineering, United States Air Force Academy, Colorado Springs, Colorado
1983 Squadron Officer School, by correspondence
1986 Air Command and Staff College, by correspondence
1986 NATO Tactical Leadership Program, Jever Air Base, West Germany
1988 Distinguished graduate, United States Air Force Fighter Weapons School, Nellis Air Force Base, Nevada
1989 Master of Aeronautical Science degree, Embry-Riddle Aeronautical University, Daytona Beach, Florida
1994 Air War College, by seminar
1995 Master of Science degree in national security strategy, National War College, Fort Lesley J. McNair, Washington, D.C.
2006 Joint Force Air Component Commander Course, Maxwell Air Force Base, Alabama
2007 Capstone Flag Officer Course, National Defense University, Fort Lesley J. McNair, Washington, D.C.
2008 Joint Flag Officer Warfighter Course, Maxwell Air Force Base, Alabama
2008 Defense Policy Seminar, Elliott School of International Affairs, George Washington University, Washington, D.C.

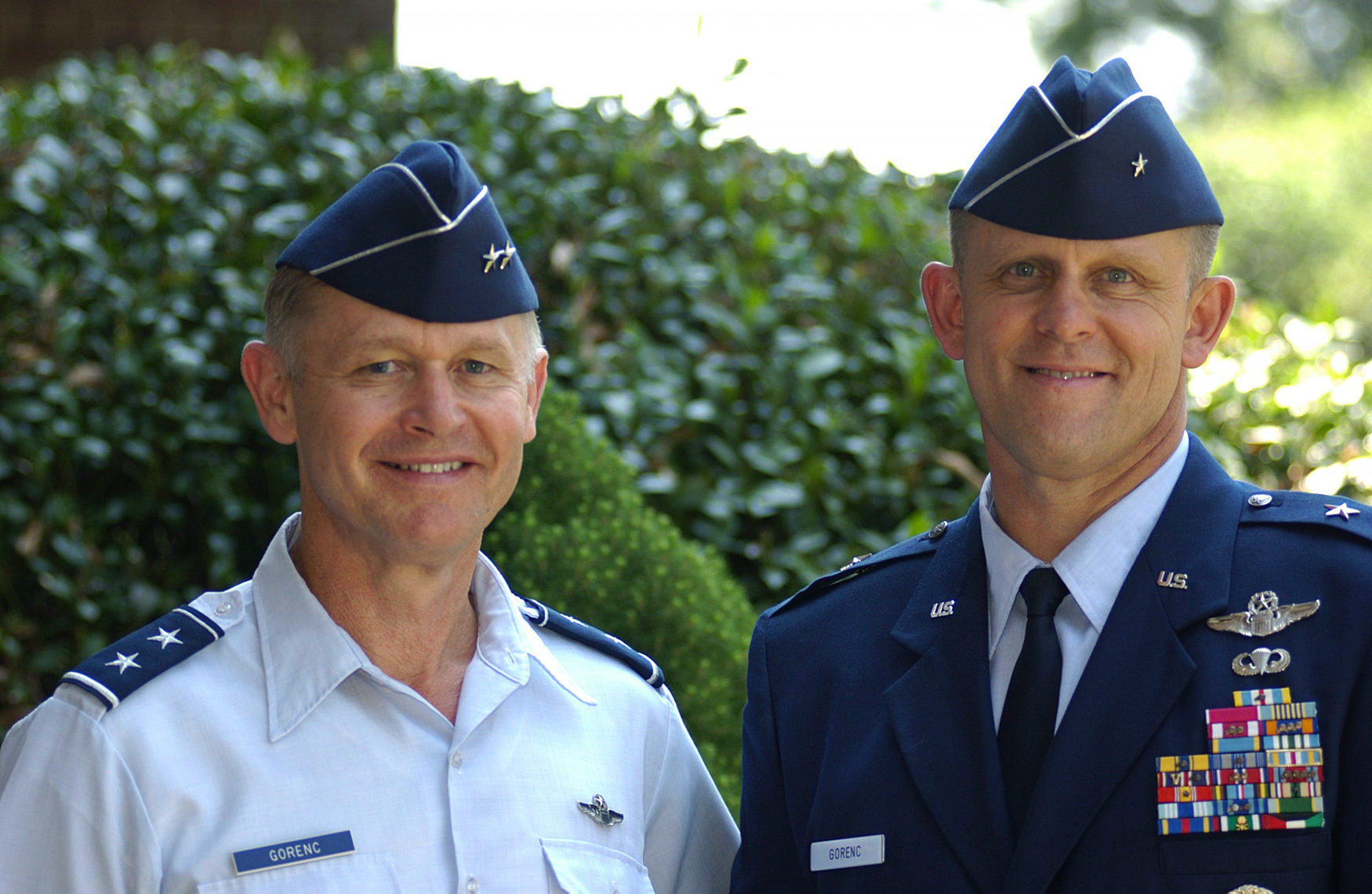
Maj. Gen. Stanley Gorenc (left) and his brother, Brig. Gen. Frank Gorenc.

== Assignments ==
- August 1979 – December 1980, student, undergraduate pilot training, Vance Air Force Base, Oklahoma
- December 1980 – April 1984, T-38A instructor pilot and flight examiner, 25th Flying Training Squadron, Vance Air Force Base, Oklahoma
- April 1984 – August 1984, student, F-15 Replacement Training Unit, Luke Air Force Base, Arizona
- August 1984 – April 1988, F-15C aircraft commander, flight examiner and flight commander, 525th Tactical Fighter Squadron, Bitburg Air Force Base, West Germany
- April 1988 – October 1991, F-15C aircraft commander and Chief, Weapons and Tactics, 94th Fighter Squadron, Langley Air Force Base, Virginia
- October 1991 – March 1992, chief, Weapons and Tactics, 1st Fighter Wing, Langley Air Force Base, Virginia
- March 1992 – June 1992, aide to the Commander, Tactical Air Command, Langley Air Force Base, Virginia
- June 1992 – September 1993, aide to the Commander, Air Combat Command, Langley Air Force Base, Virginia
- September 1993 – August 1994, chief, Operational Officer Assignments Branch, Air Combat Command, Langley Air Force Base, Virginia
- August 1994 – September 1995, student, National War College, Fort Lesley J. McNair, Washington, D.C.
- September 1995 – January 1996, operations officer, 390th Fighter Squadron, Mountain Home Air Force Base, Idaho
- January 1996 – June 1997, commander, 390th Fighter Squadron, Mountain Home Air Force Base, Idaho
- June 1997 – January 1998, special assistant to 366th Operations Group Commander, Mountain Home Air Force Base, Idaho
- January 1998 – December 2000, chief, Studies, Analysis and Gaming Division, Joint Staff, The Pentagon, Washington, D.C.
- December 2000 – August 2002, commander, 18th Operations Group, Kadena Air Base, Japan
- August 2002 – September 2003, special assistant to U.S. European Command/Supreme Allied Commander Europe, Mons, Belgium
- September 2003 – June 2005, commander, 1st Fighter Wing, Langley Air Force Base, Virginia
- June 2005 – July 2006, commander, 332nd Air Expeditionary Wing, Balad Air Base, Iraq
- August 2006 – June 2007, director, Operational Plans and Joint Matters, Deputy Chief of Staff for Air, Space and Information Operations, Plans and Requirements, Headquarters U.S. Air Force, Washington, D.C.
- June 2007 – August 2008, commander, Air Force District of Washington, Andrews Air Force Base, Maryland
- August 2008 – August 2009, director of Air and Space Operations, Air Combat Command, Langley Air Force Base, Virginia
- August 2009 – March 2012, commander, 3rd Air Force, Ramstein Air Base, Germany
- April 2012 – August 2013, Assistant Vice Chief of Staff and Director, Air Staff (United States), Headquarters United States Air Force at the Pentagon, Andrews Air Force Base, Maryland
- August 2013 – August 2016, commander, U.S. Air Forces in Europe; Commander, U.S. Air Forces in Africa; Commander, Air Component Command, headquartered at Ramstein Air Base, Germany; and Director, Joint Air Power Competency Centre, Kalkar, Germany.

== Awards and decorations ==
Personal decorations
	Defense Distinguished Service Medal
	Air Force Distinguished Service Medal with two bronze oak leaf clusters
	Defense Superior Service Medal with bronze oak leaf cluster
Width-44 crimson ribbon with a pair of width-2 white stripes on the edges	Legion of Merit with two bronze oak leaf clusters
	Airman's Medal
Width-44 scarlet ribbon with width-4 ultramarine blue stripe at center, surrounded by width-1 white stripes. Width-1 white stripes are at the edges.	Bronze Star Medal
Width-44 crimson ribbon with two width-8 white stripes at distance 4 from the edges.	Meritorious Service Medal with two bronze oak leaf clusters
	Air Medal with three bronze oak leaf clusters
	Aerial Achievement Medal with silver oak leaf cluster
	Joint Service Commendation Medal
	Air Force Commendation Medal with bronze oak leaf cluster
	Air Force Achievement Medal with bronze oak leaf cluster
Unit awards
	Joint Meritorious Unit Award with bronze oak leaf cluster
	Air Force Meritorious Unit Award
	Air Force Outstanding Unit Award with Valor device and three bronze oak leaf clusters
	Air Force Outstanding Unit Award (second ribbon to denote fifth award)
Service Awards
	Combat Readiness Medal with four bronze oak leaf clusters
Campaign and service medals
Width=44 scarlet ribbon with a central width-4 golden yellow stripe, flanked by pairs of width-1 scarlet, white, Old Glory blue, and white stripes	National Defense Service Medal with bronze service star
	Armed Forces Expeditionary Medal
	Southwest Asia Service Medal with one service star
	Iraq Campaign Medal with two bronze service stars
	Global War on Terrorism Service Medal
	Air and Space Campaign Medal
Service, training, and marksmanship awards
	Air Force Overseas Short Tour Service Ribbon
	Air Force Overseas Long Tour Service Ribbon with two bronze oak leaf clusters
	Air Force Expeditionary Service Ribbon with gold frame
	Air Force Longevity Service Award with silver and three bronze oak leaf clusters
	Small Arms Expert Marksmanship Ribbon
	Air Force Training Ribbon
Foreign awards
	NATO Meritorious Service Medal
	NATO Medal for Former Yugoslavia
	Kuwait Liberation Medal (Saudi Arabia)
	Kuwait Liberation Medal (Kuwait)

Other accoutrements
US Air Force Command Pilot Badge
Basic Parachutist Badge
Office of the Joint Chiefs of Staff Identification Badge
Headquarters Air Force Badge
Allied Air Command Badge

Other achievements
2006 Joseph A. Moller Trophy, Air Combat Command's Outstanding Wing Commander

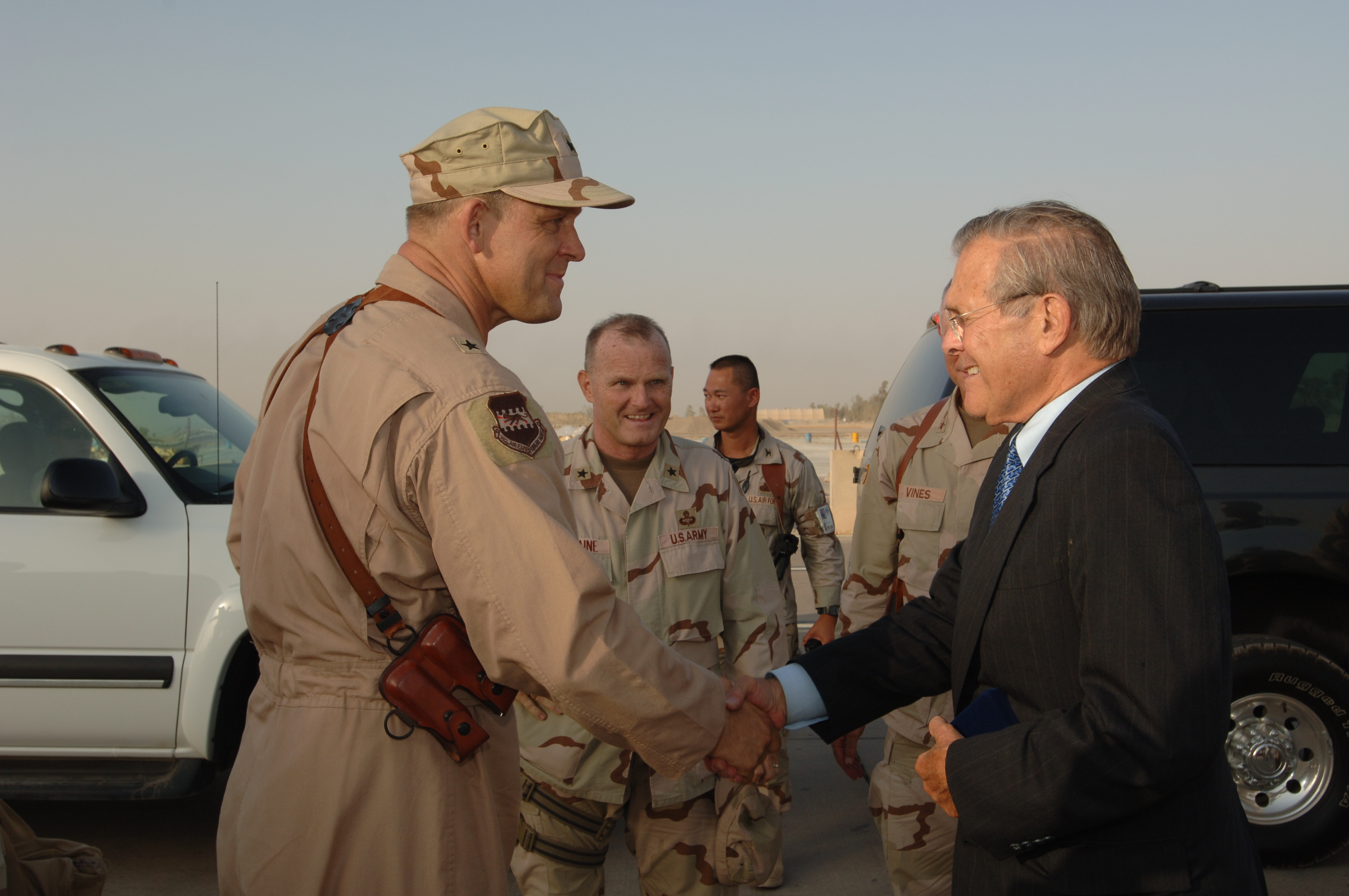
Gorenc shakes hands with Donald Rumsfeld in Balad, Iraq

== Effective dates of promotion ==
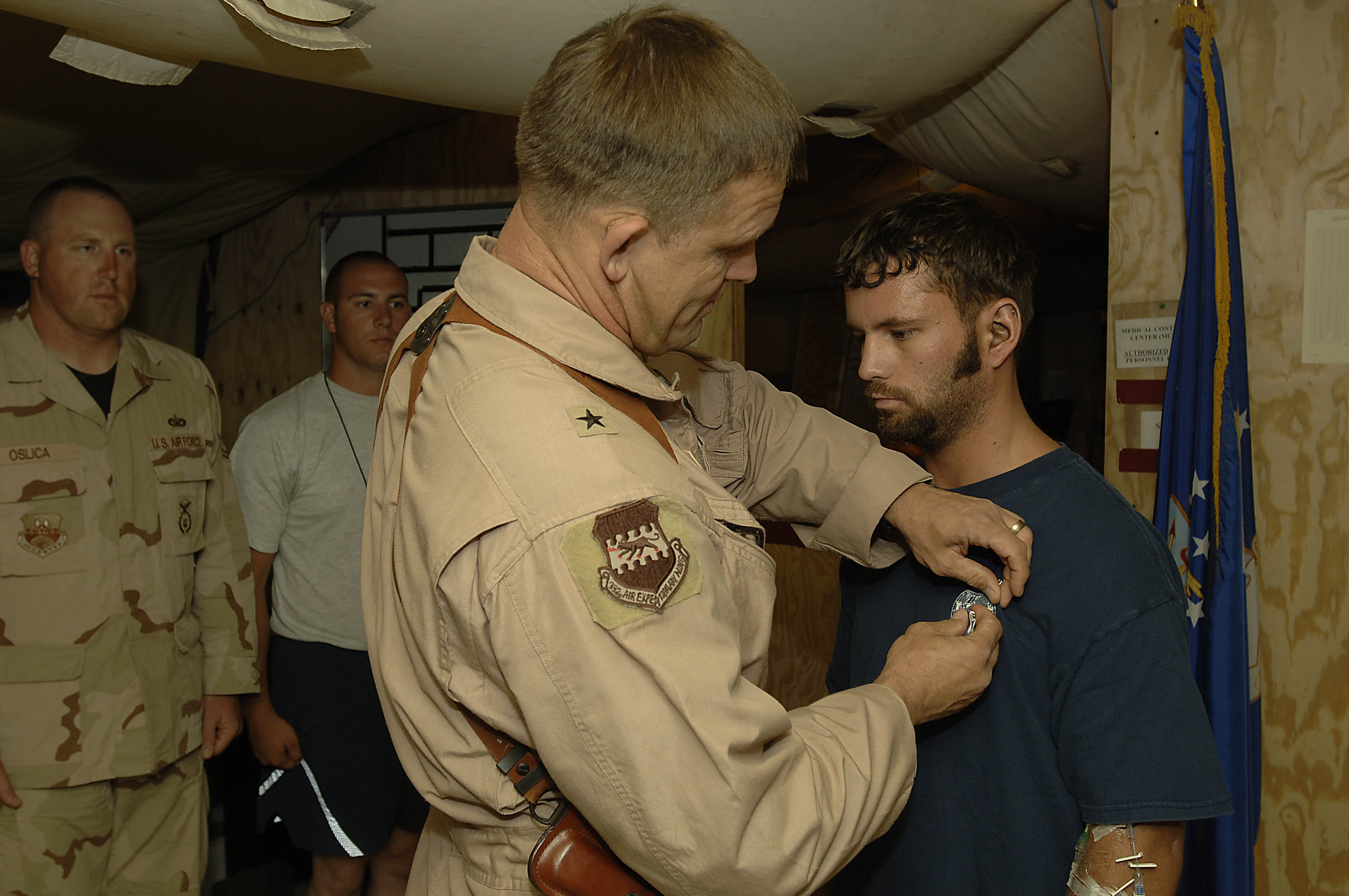
Gorenc awards a soldier a Purple Heart in Balad, Iraq

Promotions
Insignia	Rank	Date
	General	2 August 2013
	Lieutenant General	24 August 2009
	Major general	1 February 2008
	Brigadier general	1 October 2005
	Colonel	1 September 1998
	Lieutenant colonel	1 March 1994
	Major	1 June 1990
	Captain	30 May 1983
	First lieutenant	30 May 1981
	Second lieutenant	30 May 1979
