= Air Force Safety Center =

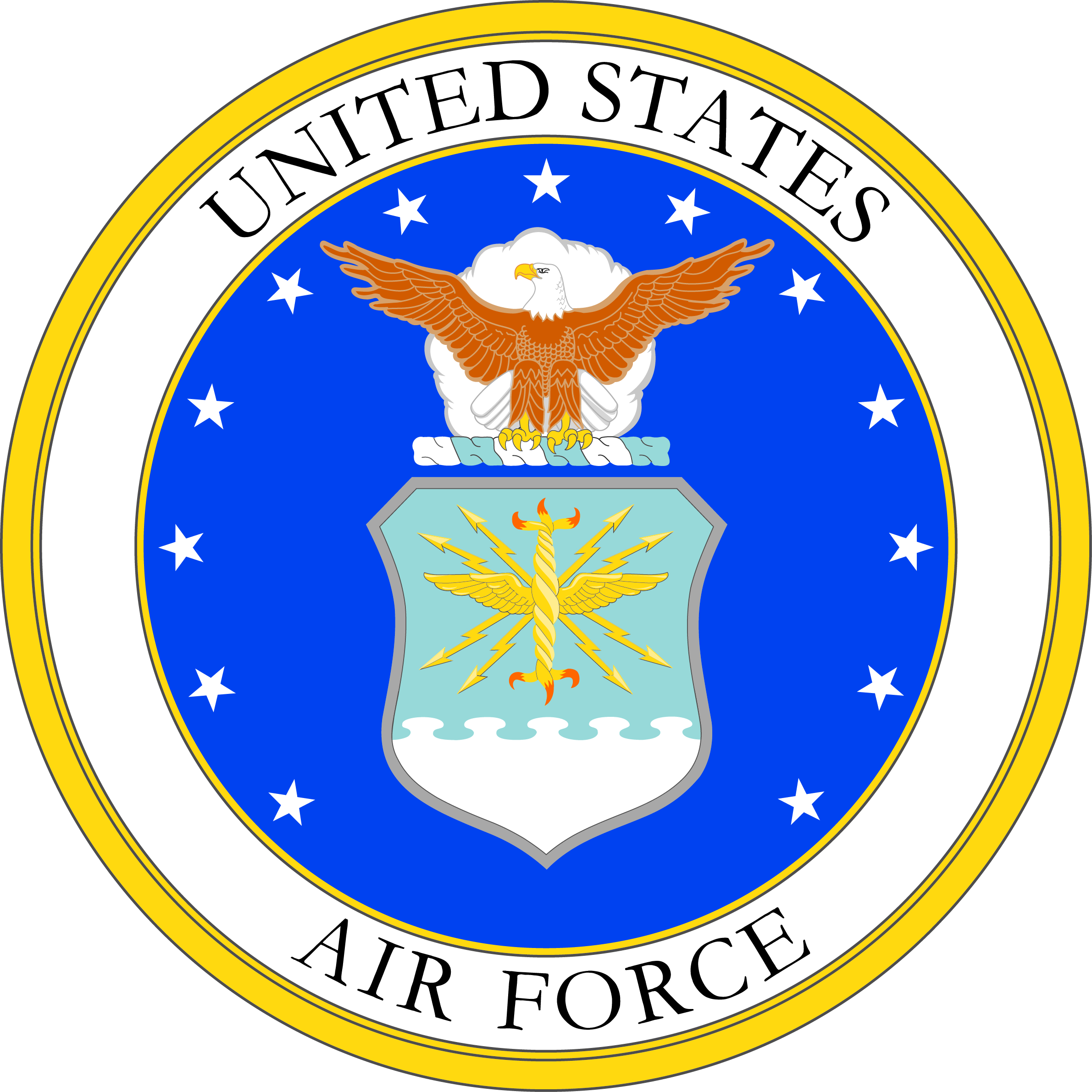
Air Force Safety Center

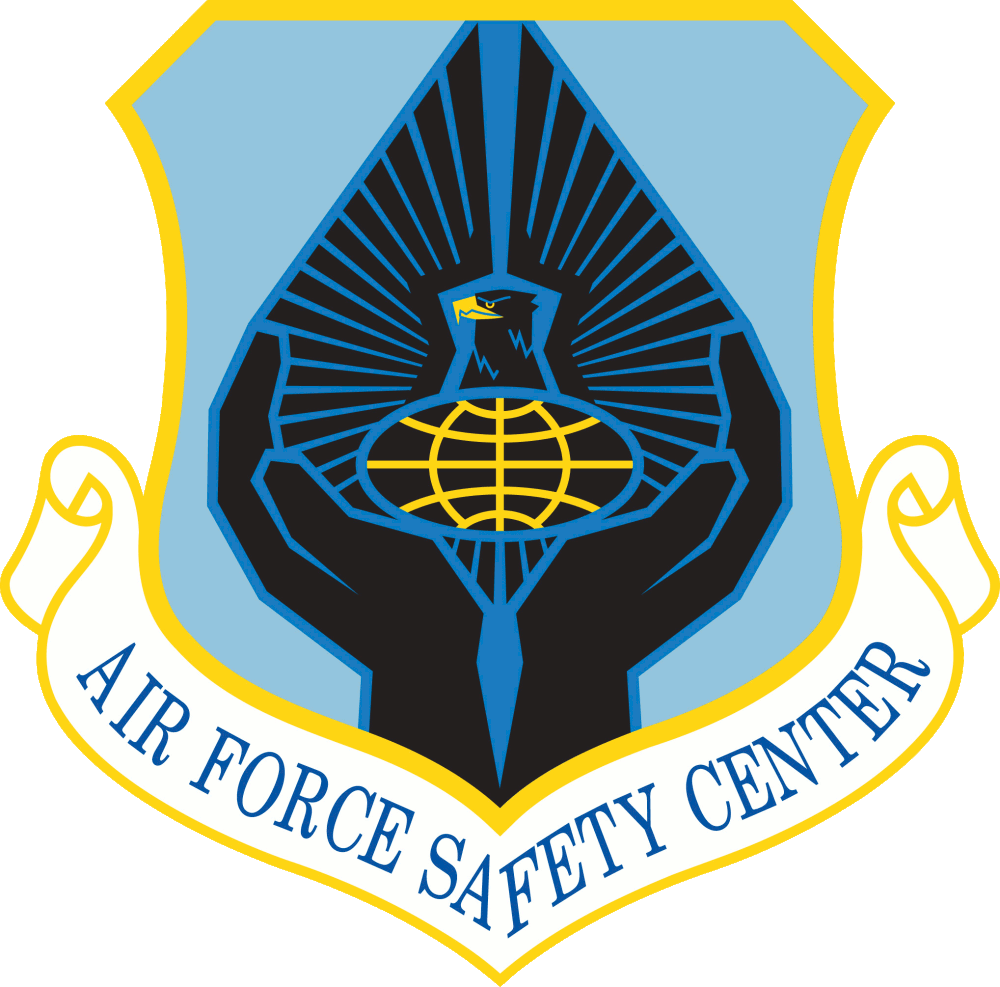
- Air Force Safety Center emblem
- Active: 1991 – present
- Country: United States
- Branch: United States Air Force
- Part of: United States Air Force
- Garrison/HQ: Kirtland Air Force Base

Commanders
- Current commander: Brigadier General Otis C. Jones

The Air Force Safety Center is a field operating agency with headquarters at Kirtland Air Force Base, New Mexico, United States.

== Mission ==
"Safeguarding Airmen – Protecting Resources – Preserving Combat Capability. The Air Force Safety Center develops, implements, executes and evaluates Air Force aviation, occupational, weapons, space and system mishap prevention and nuclear surety programs and policy. The center oversees mishap investigations, evaluates corrective actions, ensures implementation and maintains the mishap database Air Force-wide. It also conducts research to promote safety awareness/mishap prevention and develops and directs safety and risk management education for all safety disciplines."

== Personnel ==
There are approximately 155 people, not including contractor support, assigned to the Air Force Safety Center, split with approximately 50 percent civilians and 50 percent military members.

== Organization ==
The Air Force Chief of Safety, who also holds the title of commander, Air Force Safety Center, heads the organization and is located at the Pentagon with an Air Staff liaison division. The Air Force Safety Center is composed of the Deputy Chief of Safety/Executive Director and ten divisions at its Kirtland AFB location.

The Aviation Safety Division consists of safety-trained professionals spanning the domain of flight. The division preserves warfighting capability by establishing Air Force aviation safety policy, promoting mishap prevention programs for all aviation assets and through the establishment of proactive safety programs. It oversees the aviation mishap investigative process, the collection and accuracy of flight safety data and the disposition of risk-mitigating actions. It provides proactive and reactive engineering and operational analyses of flight safety issues. Additionally, the division directs the Aircraft Information Program, the Hazardous Air Traffic Report Program, the Bird Aircraft Strike Hazard Program and the Mishap Analysis and Animation Facility.

The Occupational Safety Division manages the Air Force occupational safety program, including operational, occupational, sports and recreation, and traffic safety. It oversees integration of Air Force safety inspections and policy in conjunction with the Air Force inspector general, as well as integration of risk management processes in on- and off-duty activities. The division manages Air Force safety standards and interprets Department of Labor and industry standards for implementation throughout the Air Force. The division conducts evaluations of service-wide occupational safety mishap investigations and provides advice to investigators in the field through their parent major commands. The division is responsible for the development and content of formal occupational safety-related training courses for supervisors and safety professionals. It develops and oversees occupational safety policy, programs and procedures to provide a safe work environment and enhance the safety of Air Force personnel while off duty to help maintain combat capability and readiness.

The Space Safety Division mission is to preserve combat space-power by anticipating, reducing, and preventing mishaps. The division develops, executes, and evaluates Air Force space mishap prevention programs and executes Interagency Nuclear Safety Review Panel responsibilities on behalf of the Department of Defense. The division oversees mishap investigations, conducts evaluations, and ensures application of corrective actions and mishap inclusion to the Air Force Safety Automated System. It promotes safety awareness and mishap prevention with DoD, civil, commercial, academic, and international partners, as well as the Space Safety Council.

The Weapons Safety Division establishes and defines Air Force nuclear surety and safety policy for the development and operational use of all nuclear, conventional and directed energy (DE) weapons systems. The division oversees the Air Force Nuclear Weapons Surety Program, delegated from the Secretary of the Air Force and Chief of Staff of the Air Force. The division provides nuclear, conventional and DE weapons systems safety design certification, Hazard of Electromagnetic Radiation to Ordnance certification, Air Force explosives safety standards, explosive siting reviews, weapons safety consultation and Federal Department of Agriculture waivers for DE systems. The division also performs radiation safety oversight, explosives hazard classifications, mishap prevention programs, mishap investigation, and staff assistance in its areas of responsibility. The division leadership chairs several multi-agency boards performing safety oversight for all nuclear, conventional and DE (laser and radio-frequency) weapons.

The Human Factors Division supports every aspect of the safety effort in addressing the No. 1 cause of Air Force mishaps: human error. The division includes experts from aircraft operations, medicine, physiology, psychology and occupational safety, all focused on the human element in mishap prevention. The division supports aviation, occupational, weapons, education and space safety divisions in their investigational, instructional and mishap prevention activities. It is responsible for the quality control of Human Factors Analysis and Classification System (HFACS) coding in all Class A mishaps. It provides consultations to commanders at every level of leadership and is responsible for safety culture assessment including the Air Force Combined Mishap Reduction System (AFCMRS) Safety Survey and the on-site Organizational Safety Assessments (OSAs). The Division analyzes data sources to identify human factor hazards and provides research-based policy recommendations on mitigation strategies.

The Analysis and Cyberspace Operations Division's mission is to leverage information technology, in a cost-effective manner, to support the Air Force safety mission. The division develops and sustains a unique safety reporting system called the Air Force Safety Automated System (AFSAS) which collects and maintains safety related data, used by the Air Force and Department of Defense safety communities to investigate mishaps and mitigate hazards for all safety disciplines. This system also provides an analysis and trending capability through its comprehensive safety database. This database enables the safety center to rapidly respond to both internal and external customer requirements for mishap safety data. The division also supports all cybersecurity, communications, and information technology systems for the entire safety center.

The Training and Force Development Division serves as the foundation of excellence in ensuring the continuous professional development of all personnel assigned to safety staffs and/or supporting safety Air Force-wide. The program develops, teaches and manages the requisite safety education and training to enhance safety knowledge, skills and abilities that enhance aerospace power by eliminating mishaps through proactive hazard identification and risk management. The education and training encompasses all safety disciplines: aviation, occupational, weapons, space and missiles; ensuring mission-ready capabilities are preserved for the U.S. Air Force, and is delivered to approximately 2,400 students through nine professional courses in 60 sessions, ranging from three days to seven weeks. The program ensures current and future mishap prevention requirements and opportunities are addressed by providing interactive education and training through on-site classroom course offerings, web-based course offerings and distance learning courses. The division chief serves as the safety civilian career field manager, establishing policy and serving as the day-to-day advocate for issues and concerns, and as the functional manager for the Air Force safety manpower standard and variances.

The Personnel and Resource Division is responsible for complex managerial services for the Center including all personnel, manpower, program management, knowledge operations, and facilities management, as well as planning, programming, budget and execution. The division provides support to the Air Force Chief of Safety and the entire Air Force Safety Center. It is the backbone for mission and infrastructure support to ensure continuity and efficiency across the enterprise.

The Office of the Staff Judge Advocate provides legal advice and general counsel on all aspects of Air Force mishap prevention programs and safety investigations. The office ensures proper controls are maintained on safety reports and privileged information. It also provides effective coordination on legal and safety issues with the DoD, other federal agencies and international safety programs. The office maintains the Air Force Safety Center Records Library, ensuring efficient and timely retrieval of safety investigation reports for review and analysis. In addition, it responds to requests for safety information under the Freedom of Information Act, Congressional requests and other functional requests.

The Public Affairs Division supports the Chief of Safety's communication program by providing service members and the general public timely and accurate information to raise awareness and improve understanding of the Air Force Safety Center mission and its role in mishap prevention, and to promote mishap prevention Air Force-wide. The division manages the center's public website and social media programs; generates news releases, photos and video products for Air Force-wide distribution; and engages with the news media to ensure the accurate reporting of safety programs and mishap prevention efforts.

== History ==
After the Air Force became a separate department, the Air Force Chief of Staff designated the Office of the Inspector General to oversee all inspection and safety functions. These functions were consolidated in an inspector general group at Norton AFB, California, in the 1950s.

On Dec. 31, 1971, the Air Force Inspection and Safety Center was activated, replacing the 1002nd Inspector General Group. The center was then divided into the Air Force Inspection Agency and the Air Force Safety Agency in August 1991. Reorganization of the air staff in 1992 created the Air Force Chief of Safety position, reporting directly to the Air Force Chief of Staff. The Chief of Safety became dual-hatted as the commander of the Air Force Safety Agency. In July 1993, the agency moved to Kirtland AFB due to the closure of Norton AFB.

Following the Blue Ribbon Panel on Aviation Safety in 1995, the Air Force Safety Center was activated on January 1, 1996, when the Air Force Chief of Safety and support staff moved from Washington, D.C., to consolidate all safety functions at Kirtland AFB. The Chief of Safety position was changed from a brigadier general to a major general.

The Deputy Chief of Safety/Executive Director position was created in October 2003 to oversee the daily functions of the center. The Chief of Safety and support staff moved back to the Pentagon in April 2004.
