= Monica Lewinsky =

American activist (born 1973)

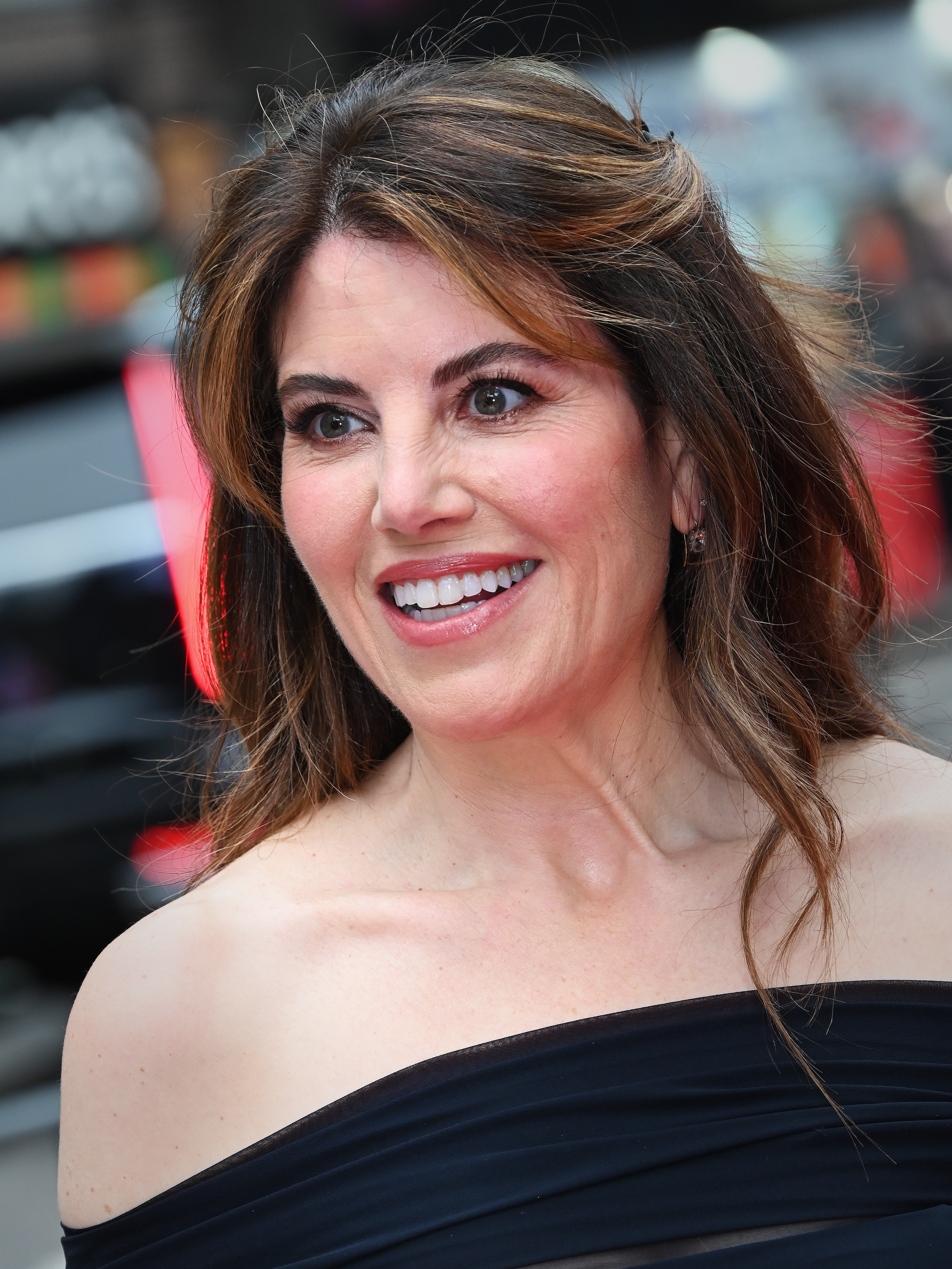
- Lewinsky in 2025
- Born: Monica Samille Lewinsky; July 23, 1973 (age 53); San Francisco, California, U.S.
- Education: Lewis and Clark College (BS); London School of Economics (MSc)
- Occupations: Activist; television personality (formerly); government assistant (formerly)
- Years active: 1995–2005 • 2014–present
- Employer(s): White House Office of Legislative Affairs; The Pentagon
- Known for: Clinton–Lewinsky scandal
- Father: Bernard Lewinsky

Monica Samille Lewinsky (born July 23, 1973) is an American activist. She became internationally known in the late 1990s after U.S. president Bill Clinton admitted to having had an affair with her during her days as a White House intern between 1995 and 1997. The affair and its repercussions (which included Clinton's impeachment) became known as the Clinton–Lewinsky scandal.

Following the scandal, Lewinsky designed a line of handbags under her name, served as an advertising spokesperson for a diet plan, and worked as a television personality. She obtained a master's degree in psychology from the London School of Economics in 2006. In 2014, Lewinsky began speaking out as an activist against cyberbullying.

== Early life ==
Monica Samille Lewinsky was born in San Francisco, California, and grew up in an affluent family in Los Angeles, California. She lived in Brentwood, and later Beverly Hills. Her father is Bernard Lewinsky, an oncologist, who is the son of German Jews who emigrated from Germany in the 1920s, first moving to El Salvador and then finally to the United States when he was 14. Her mother, born Marcia Kay Vilensky, is an author who uses the name Marcia Lewis. In 1996, she wrote a "gossip biography", The Private Lives of the Three Tenors. Lewinsky’s maternal grandfather, Samuel M. Vilensky, was a Lithuanian Jew, and her maternal grandmother, Bronia Poleshuk, was born in the British Concession of Tianjin, China, to a Russian Jewish family. Lewinsky’s parents divorced in 1988 and each has remarried.

The family attended Sinai Temple in Los Angeles and Lewinsky attended Sinai Akiba Academy, the school affiliated with the Temple. For her primary education, she attended the John Thomas Dye School in Bel-Air. Lewinsky attended Beverly Hills High School for three years before transferring to Bel Air Prep (later known as Pacific Hills School), graduating in 1991.

Following her high school graduation, Lewinsky attended Santa Monica College while working for the drama department at Beverly Hills High School and at a tie shop. Andy Bleiler, her former high school drama instructor, alleged they began a five-year affair in 1992.

In 1993, she enrolled at Lewis & Clark College in Portland, Oregon, graduating with a bachelor's degree in psychology in 1995.

With the assistance of a family connection, Lewinsky secured an unpaid summer White House internship in the office of White House chief of staff Leon Panetta. Lewinsky moved to Washington, D.C., and took up the position in July 1995. She moved to a paid posting in the White House Office of Legislative Affairs in December 1995.

== Scandal ==
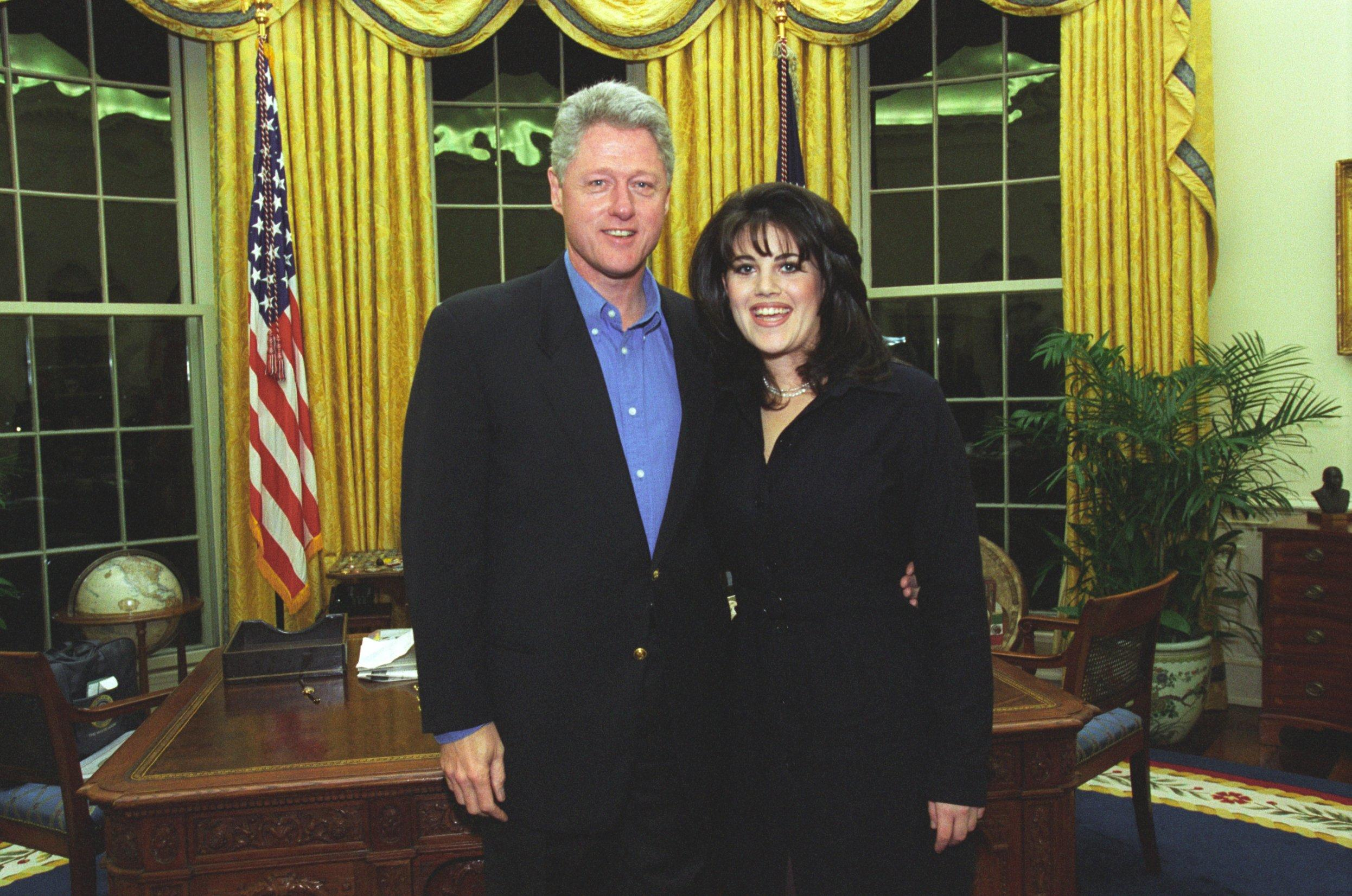
Clinton with Lewinsky in February 1997

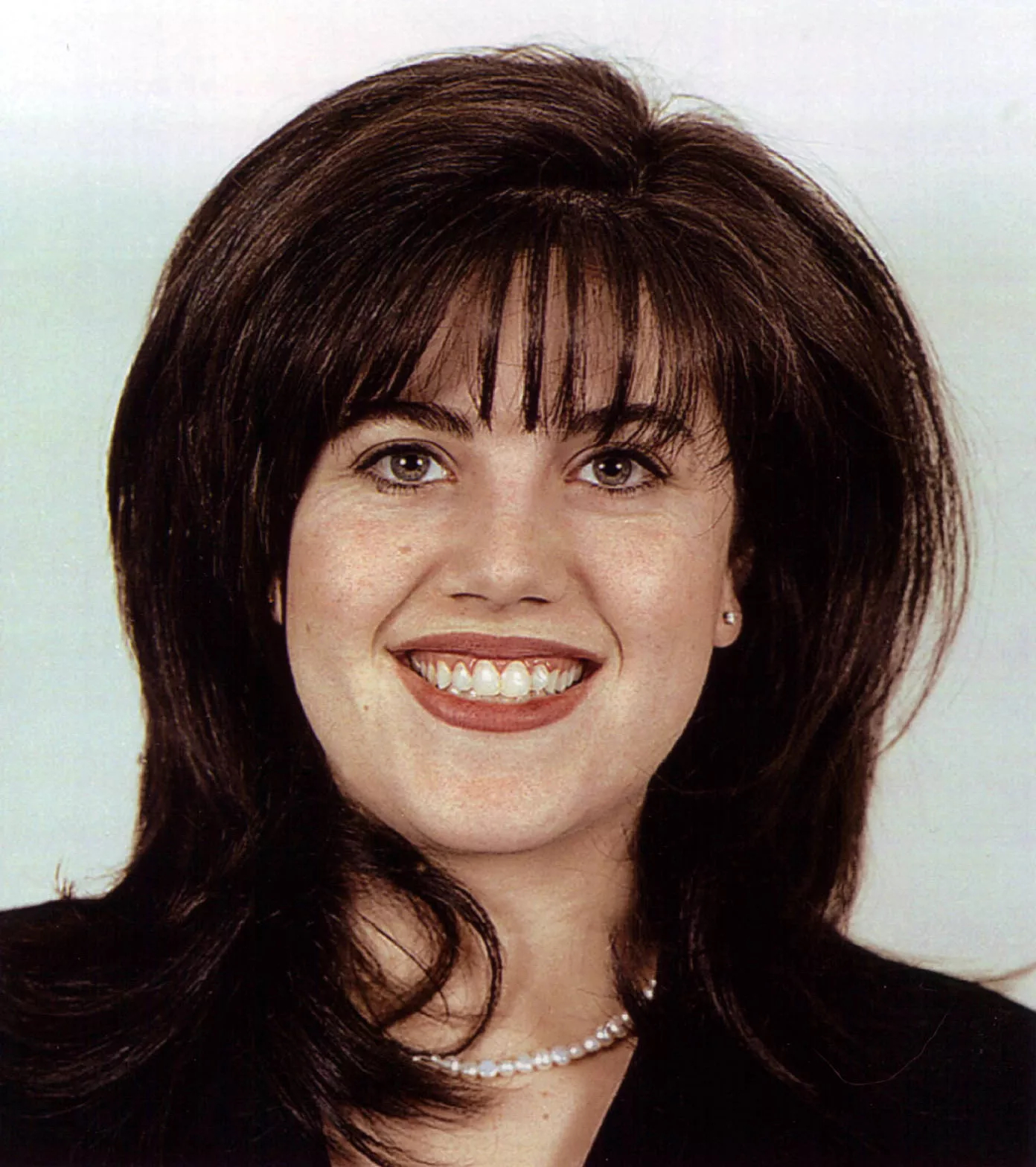
Lewinsky's May 1997 government identification photograph

Lewinsky stated that she had nine sexual encounters with President Bill Clinton in the Oval Office between November 1995 and March 1997. According to her testimony, these encounters involved oral sex and other sexual acts, but not sexual intercourse.

Clinton had previously been confronted with allegations of sexual misconduct during his time as Governor of Arkansas. Former Arkansas state employee Paula Jones filed a civil lawsuit against him alleging that he had sexually harassed her. Lewinsky's name surfaced during the discovery phase of Jones' case, when Jones' lawyers sought to show a pattern of behavior by Clinton which involved inappropriate sexual relationships with other government employees.

In April 1996, Lewinsky's superiors transferred her from the White House to the Pentagon because they felt that she was spending too much time with Clinton. At the Pentagon, she worked as an assistant to chief Pentagon spokesman Kenneth Bacon. In September 1997, after Lewinsky told co-worker Linda Tripp about her relationship with Clinton, Tripp began to secretly record their telephone conversations. Lewinsky left her position at the Pentagon in December 1997, and in January 1998 submitted an affidavit in the Paula Jones case denying any physical relationship with Clinton. Though she attempted to persuade Tripp to lie under oath in that case, Tripp gave the tapes to Independent Counsel Kenneth Starr, adding to his ongoing investigation into the Whitewater controversy. Starr then broadened his investigation beyond the Arkansas land use deal to include Lewinsky, Clinton, and others for possible perjury and subornation of perjury in the Jones case. Tripp reported the taped conversations to literary agent Lucianne Goldberg. She also convinced Lewinsky to save the gifts that Clinton had given her during their relationship and not to dry clean a blue dress that was stained with Clinton's semen. Under oath, Clinton denied having had "a sexual affair", "sexual relations", or "a sexual relationship" with Lewinsky.

News of the Clinton–Lewinsky relationship broke in January 1998. On January 26, 1998, Clinton stated, "I did not have sexual relations with that woman, Miss Lewinsky" in a nationally televised White House news conference. The matter instantly occupied the news media, and Lewinsky spent the next weeks hiding from public attention in her mother's residence at the Watergate complex. News of Lewinsky's affair with Andy Bleiler, her former high school drama instructor, also came to light, and he turned over to Starr various souvenirs, photographs, and documents that Lewinsky had sent him and his wife during the time that she was in the White House.

Clinton had also said, "There is not a sexual relationship, an improper sexual relationship or any other kind of improper relationship" which he defended as truthful on August 17, 1998, because of his use of the present tense, arguing "it depends on what the meaning of the word 'is' is". Starr obtained a blue dress from Lewinsky with Clinton's semen stained on it, as well as testimony from her that the President had inserted a cigar into her vagina. Clinton stated, "I did have a relationship with Miss Lewinsky that was not appropriate", but he denied committing perjury because, according to Clinton, the legal definition of oral sex was not encompassed by "sex" per se. In addition, he relied on the definition of "sexual relations" as proposed by the prosecution and agreed by the defense and by Judge Susan Webber Wright, who was hearing the Paula Jones case. Clinton claimed that certain acts were performed on him, not by him, and therefore he did not engage in sexual relations. Lewinsky's testimony to the Starr Commission, however, contradicted Clinton's claim of being totally passive in their encounters.

Clinton and Lewinsky were both called before a grand jury. Clinton testified via closed-circuit television, while Lewinsky testified in person. She was granted transactional immunity by the Office of the Independent Counsel in exchange for her testimony.

=== Life after the scandal ===
Lewinsky's immunity agreement restricted what she could talk about publicly, but she was able to cooperate with Andrew Morton in his writing of Monica's Story, her biography which included her side of the Clinton affair. The book was published in March 1999; it was also excerpted as a cover story in Time magazine. On March 3, 1999, Barbara Walters interviewed Lewinsky on ABC's 20/20. The program was watched by 70 million Americans, which ABC said was a record for a news show. Lewinsky made about $500,000 from her participation in the book and another $1 million from international rights to the Walters interview, but was still beset by high legal bills and living costs.

In June 1999, Ms. magazine published a series of articles by writer Susan Jane Gilman, sexologist Susie Bright, and author-host Abiola Abrams arguing from three generations of women whether Lewinsky's behavior had any meaning for feminism. Also in 1999, Lewinsky declined to sign an autograph in an airport, saying, "I'm kind of known for something that's not so great to be known for." She made a cameo appearance as herself in two sketches during the May 8, 1999, episode of NBC's Saturday Night Live, a program that had lampooned her relationship with Clinton over the prior 16 months.

In September 1999, Lewinsky began to sell a line of handbags bearing her name, under the company name The Real Monica, Inc. They were sold online as well as at Henri Bendel in New York, Fred Segal in California, and The Cross in London. Lewinsky designed the bags—described by New York magazine as "hippie-ish, reversible totes"—and traveled frequently to supervise their manufacture in Louisiana.

At the start of 2000, Lewinsky began appearing in television commercials for the diet company Jenny Craig, Inc. The $1 million endorsement deal, which required Lewinsky to lose 40 or more pounds in six months, gained considerable publicity at the time. Lewinsky said that despite her desire to return to a more private life, she needed the money to pay off legal fees, and she believed in the product. A Jenny Craig spokesperson said of Lewinsky, "She represents a busy active woman of today with a hectic lifestyle. And she has had weight issues and weight struggles for a long time. That represents a lot of women in America." The choice of Lewinsky as a role model proved controversial for Jenny Craig, and some of its private franchises switched to an older advertising campaign. The company stopped running the Lewinsky ads in February 2000, concluded her campaign entirely in April 2000, and paid her only $300,000 of the $1 million contracted for her involvement.

Also at the start of 2000, Lewinsky moved to New York City, lived in the West Village, and became an A-list guest in the Manhattan social scene. In February 2000, she appeared on MTV's The Tom Green Show, in an episode in which the host took her to his parents' home in Ottawa in search of fabric for her new handbag business. Later in 2000, Lewinsky worked as a correspondent for Channel 5 in the UK, on the show Monica's Postcards, reporting on U.S. culture and trends from a variety of locations.

In March 2002, Lewinsky, no longer bound by the terms of her immunity agreement, appeared in the HBO special, "Monica in Black and White", part of the America Undercover series. In it she answered a studio audience's questions about her life and the Clinton affair.

Lewinsky hosted a reality television dating program, Mr. Personality, on Fox Television Network in 2003, where she advised young women contestants who were picking men hidden by masks. Some Americans tried to organize a boycott of advertisers on the show, to protest Lewinsky's capitalizing on her notoriety. Nevertheless, the show debuted to very high ratings, and Alessandra Stanley wrote in The New York Times: "after years of trying to cash in on her fame by designing handbags and other self-marketing schemes, Ms. Lewinsky has finally found a fitting niche on television." The same year she appeared as a guest on the programs V Graham Norton in the UK, High Chaparall in Sweden, and The View and Jimmy Kimmel Live! in the U.S.

After Clinton's autobiography, My Life, appeared in 2004, Lewinsky said in an interview with the British tabloid Daily Mail:

He could have made it right with the book, but he hasn't. He is a revisionist of history. He has lied. ... I really didn't expect him to go into detail about our relationship. ... But if he had and he'd done it honestly, I wouldn't have minded. ... I did, though, at least expect him to correct the false statements he made when he was trying to protect the Presidency. Instead, he talked about it as though I had laid it all out there for the taking. I was the buffet and he just couldn't resist the dessert. ... This was a mutual relationship, mutual on all levels, right from the way it started and all the way through. ... I don't accept that he had to completely desecrate my character.

By 2005, Lewinsky found that she could not escape the spotlight in the U.S., which made both her professional and personal life difficult. She stopped selling her handbag line and moved to London to study social psychology at the London School of Economics. In December 2006, Lewinsky graduated with a Master of Science degree. Her thesis was titled, "In Search of the Impartial Juror: An Exploration of the Third-Person Effect and Pre-Trial Publicity". For the next decade, she tried to avoid publicity.

Lewinsky did correspond in 2009 with scholar Ken Gormley, who was writing an in-depth study of the Clinton scandals. Lewinsky wrote to Gormley that Clinton had lied under oath when asked detailed and specific questions about his relationship with her. In 2013, the items associated with Lewinsky that Bleiler had turned over to Starr were put up for auction by Bleiler's ex-wife, who had come into possession of them.

During her decade out of the public eye, Lewinsky lived in London, Los Angeles, New York, and Portland but, due to her notoriety, had trouble finding employment in the communications and marketing jobs for nonprofit organizations where she had been interviewed.

=== Public re-emergence ===
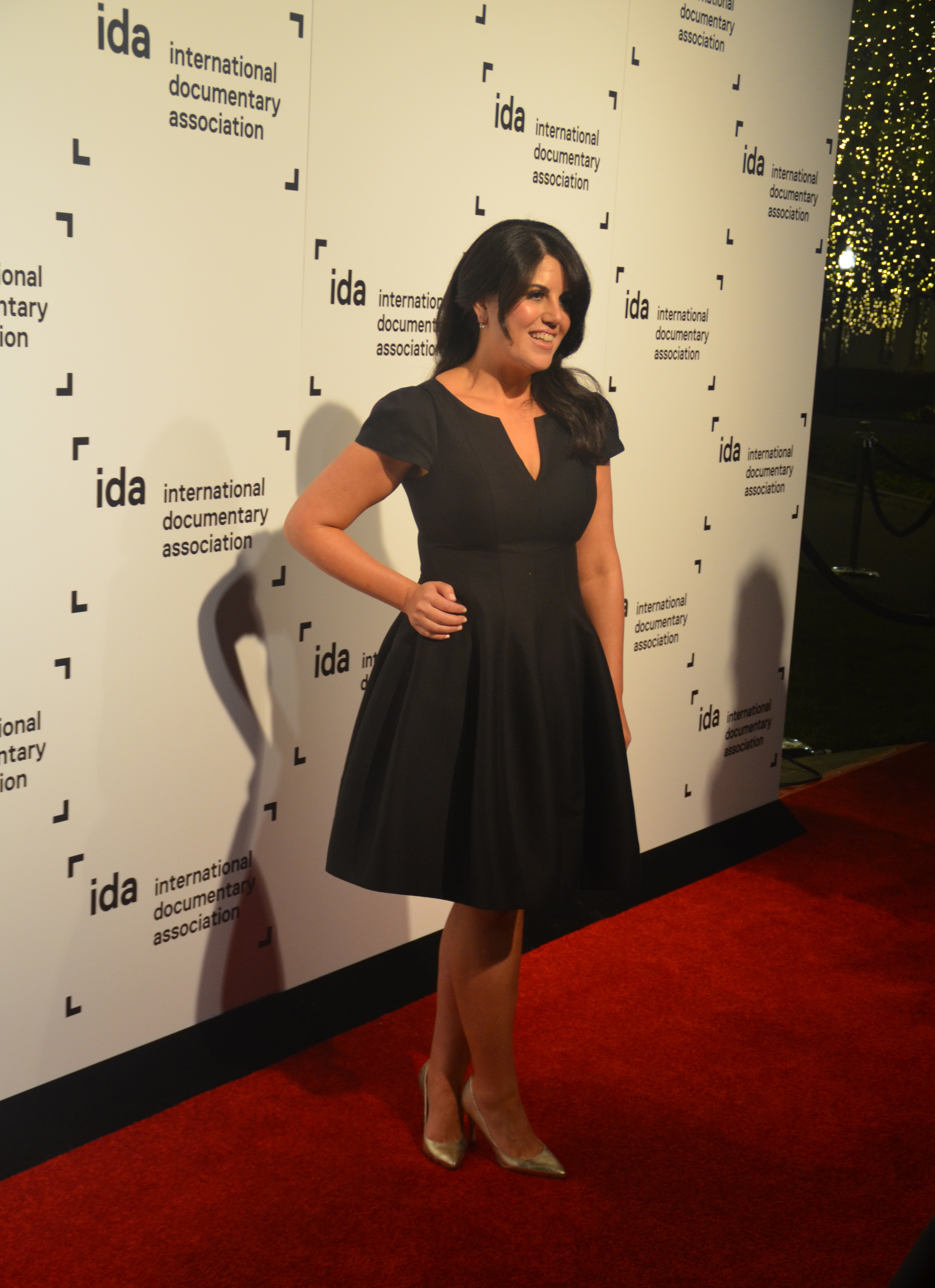
Lewinsky at the 2014 International Documentary Association Awards

In May 2014, Lewinsky wrote an essay for Vanity Fair magazine titled "Shame and Survival", wherein she discussed her life and the scandal. She continued to maintain that the relationship was mutual and wrote that while Clinton took advantage of her, it was a consensual relationship. She added: "I, myself, deeply regret what happened between me and President Clinton. Let me say it again: I. Myself. Deeply. Regret. What. Happened." However, she said it was now time to "stick my head above the parapet so that I can take back my narrative and give a purpose to my past." The magazine later announced her as a Vanity Fair contributor, stating she would "contribute to their website on an ongoing basis, on the lookout for relevant topics of interest".

In July 2014, Lewinsky was interviewed in a three-part television special for the National Geographic Channel, titled The 90s: The Last Great Decade. The series looked at various events of the 1990s, including the scandal that brought Lewinsky into the national spotlight. This was Lewinsky's first such interview in more than ten years.

In October 2014, she took a public stand against cyberbullying, calling herself "patient zero" of online harassment. Speaking at a Forbes magazine "30 Under 30" summit about her experiences in the aftermath of the scandal, she said, "Having survived myself, what I want to do now is help other victims of the shame game survive, too." She said she was influenced by reading about the suicide of Tyler Clementi, a Rutgers University freshman, involving cyberbullying and joined Twitter to facilitate her efforts. In March 2015, Lewinsky continued to speak out publicly against cyberbullying, delivering a TED talk calling for a more compassionate Internet. In June 2015, she became an ambassador and strategic advisor for anti-bullying organization Bystander Revolution. The same month, she gave an anti-cyberbullying speech at the Cannes Lions International Festival of Creativity. In September 2015, Lewinsky was interviewed by Amy Robach on Good Morning America, about Bystander Revolution's Month of Action campaign for National Bullying Prevention Month. Lewinsky wrote the foreword to an October 2017 book by Sue Scheff and Melissa Schorr, Shame Nation: The Global Epidemic of Online Hate.

In October 2017, Lewinsky tweeted the #MeToo hashtag to indicate that she was a victim of sexual harassment or sexual assault, but did not provide details. She wrote an essay in the March 2018 issue of Vanity Fair in which she did not directly explain why she used the #MeToo hashtag in October. She did write that looking back at her relationship with Bill Clinton, although it was consensual, because he was 27 years older than she and in a position with a lot more power than she had, in her opinion the relationship constituted an "abuse of power" on Clinton's part. She added that she had been diagnosed with post-traumatic stress disorder due to what she had experienced after the relationship was disclosed. In May 2018, Lewinsky was disinvited from an event hosted by Town & Country when Bill Clinton accepted an invitation to the event.

In September 2018, Lewinsky spoke at a conference in Jerusalem. Following her speech, she sat for a Q&A session with the host, journalist Yonit Levi. The first question Levi asked was whether Lewinsky thinks that Clinton owes her a private apology. Lewinsky refused to answer the question, and walked off the stage. She later tweeted that the question was posed in a pre-event meeting with Levi, and Lewinsky told her that such a question was off limits. A spokesman for the Israel Television News Company, which hosted the conference and is Levi's employer, responded that Levi had kept all the agreements she made with Lewinsky and honored her requests.

In 2019, she was interviewed by John Oliver on his HBO show Last Week Tonight with John Oliver, where they discussed the importance of solving the problem of public shaming and how her situation may have been different if social media had existed at the time that the scandal broke in the late 1990s.

On August 6, 2019, it was announced that the Clinton–Lewinsky scandal would be the focus of the third season of the television series American Crime Story with the title Impeachment. The season began production in October 2020. Lewinsky was a co-producer. It consists of 10 episodes and premiered on September 7, 2021. The season portrays the Clinton–Lewinsky scandal and is based on the book A Vast Conspiracy: The Real Story of the Sex Scandal That Nearly Brought Down a President by Jeffrey Toobin. The 28-year-old actress Beanie Feldstein plays Monica Lewinsky. In discussing the series and her observations on social media and cancel culture today in an interview with Kara Swisher for the New York Times Opinion podcast Sway, Lewinsky noted that:

I think that the first thing that went out the door in 1998 was the truth, and the second was context. And there’s no nuance. And we were all women who were thrust into the spotlight underneath a political film or sheen. And we were all reduced. We were all reduced in different ways to serve purposes for other people, for either political points or to make money.

In October 2021, she was executive producer of an HBO documentary 15 Minutes of Shame, directed by Max Joseph, which focused on public shaming, online shaming, and ostracism.

Lewinsky started her own production company, Alt Ending Productions, and signed a first look deal with 20th Television in June 2021.

In February 2025, she launched her podcast, Reclaiming with Monica Lewinsky.
