= TJ Ducklo =

American political advisor (born 1988)

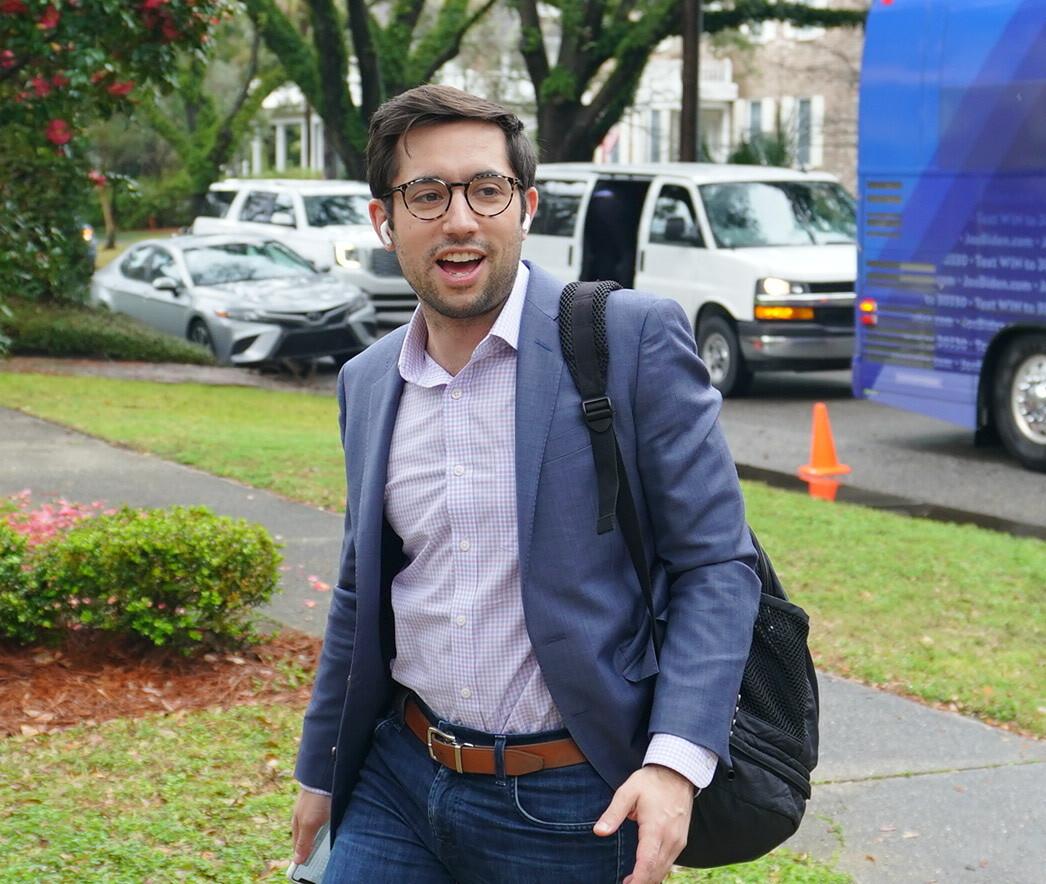
- Ducklo in 2020

White House Deputy Press Secretary
- In office January 20, 2021 – February 13, 2021
- President: Joe Biden
- Preceded by: Judd Deere
- Succeeded by: Chris Meagher

Personal details
- Born: September 22, 1988 (age 38) Nashville, Tennessee, U.S.
- Party: Democratic
- Education: George Washington University (BA)

Tyler Joseph "TJ" Ducklo (born September 22, 1988) is an American political advisor. Ducklo previously served under former president Joe Biden as a special assistant to the president and White House Deputy Press Secretary in 2021; as national press secretary for Biden's 2020 presidential campaign; and as senior advisor on the subsequent 2024 presidential campaign.

== Early life and education ==
Ducklo was born in Nashville, Tennessee and is the son of Nashville optometrist Tommy Ducklo.

He was educated at the University School of Nashville and earned a bachelor of arts degree in political communication from George Washington University School of Media and Public Affairs in 2011.

== Career ==
Ducklo previously worked as a staff assistant for James Carville and Mary Matalin. He volunteered for Karl Dean's 2007 Nashville mayoral campaign and interned in the United States Senate in 2008. Ducklo also worked on Washington, D.C.'s bid to host the 2024 Summer Olympics and has held senior media relations posts at Bloomberg News, Viacom, and the Motion Picture Association of America. In addition, Ducklo was a public relations advisor for Showtime's 2016 documentary The Circus.

Ducklo joined the Biden campaign in April 2019, his first significant role on a political campaign. Before joining the Biden campaign, Ducklo worked as senior communications director for NBC News.

=== Deputy Press Secretary ===
On January 15, 2021, it was announced that Ducklo would serve as a White House deputy press secretary in the Biden administration.

In February 2021, People reported that Ducklo was in a romantic relationship with Alexi McCammond, who covered the Biden campaign and administration for NBC and MSNBC as a contributor and as a reporter for Axios in 2019 and 2020. As a result, McCammond was reassigned to covering Vice President Kamala Harris and progressive lawmakers in Congress.

After the profile was released, Vanity Fair reported that Ducklo threatened Politico reporter Tara Palmeri, telling her he would "destroy her" if she published a story about his relationship with McCammond. He had also reportedly made "derogatory and misogynistic comments" toward Palmeri during a phone call and accused her of being "jealous" of his relationship with McCammond. On February 12, Ducklo was suspended without pay for one week and apologized. He resigned from his White House position the next day. Palmeri later wrote on Puck that she and Ducklo made amends and she said that, "there are some people who deserve to be canceled, but T.J. Ducklo is not one of them."

=== Public relations ===
In June 2021, Ducklo joined Risa Heller Communications, a boutique public relations firm in New York, as a senior vice president. His clients have included Jeff Zucker and Ketanji Brown Jackson.

=== Nashville politics ===
In April 2022, Ducklo became chief communications officer and a senior advisor to John Cooper, the mayor of Nashville, Tennessee. Ducklo oversaw "the administration's communications team and advised Cooper on political and strategic decisions," The Tennessean reported. In June 2023, Ducklo left the Mayor's office to become a senior advisor on President Biden's re-election campaign.

=== 2024 presidential campaign ===
Ducklo joined Biden's 2024 campaign and stayed after it turned into the Kamala Harris campaign, later leaving for a position as chief strategist at a PAC called Democracy Defenders.

== Personal life ==
In December 2019, Ducklo announced on Twitter that he had been diagnosed with stage-four lung cancer. Ducklo entered remission in 2020 or 2021. As of February 2021, Ducklo continued to receive treatment.
