= George E. Little =

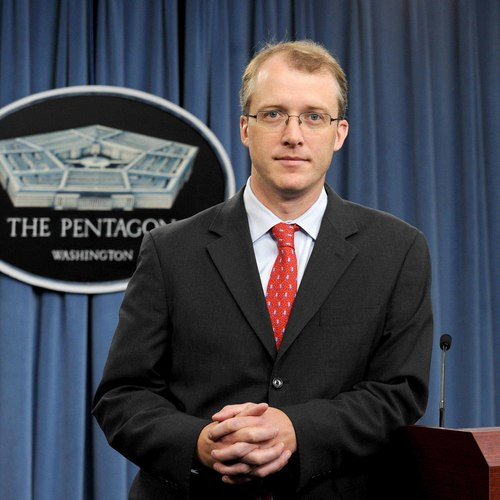
George Little at The Pentagon, July 2011

George E. Little is a former Assistant to the Secretary of Defense for Public Affairs for the U.S. Department of Defense and was replaced by Brent Colburn. He was appointed to his position on July 19, 2011. He was Pentagon press secretary from July 2011 to November 2013 and was previously the chief spokesman of the Central Intelligence Agency.

== Professional career ==
Little was appointed director of public affairs at the Central Intelligence Agency, where he served as the CIA's chief media spokesman, provided strategic counsel to the director and his senior leadership team, coordinated internal communications to CIA employees in the United States and abroad, and managed communications and outreach to the American public. Little began his communications work at the CIA in April 2007 as chief of media relations. He was the agency's spokesman for four years, under directors Michael Hayden and Leon Panetta.

From 2005 to 2007, he worked in the National Counterterrorism Center's (NCTC) Directorate of Strategic Operational Planning, where he led the development of the congressionally-mandated National Strategy to Combat Terrorist Travel, and headed an interagency group responsible for assessing the U.S. government's progress in the fight against al-Qaeda and other terrorist groups.

Little previously he worked as an intelligence community and business consultant with Booz Allen Hamilton and IBM.

Little moved to the Pentagon as press secretary in July 2011, when Panetta became Secretary of Defense. For a short time he shared the spokesman's role with Rear Admiral John Kirby. He later held the title of Assistant to the Secretary of Defense for Public Affairs and oversaw the department's public affairs operations. He stayed in the post when Chuck Hagel succeeded Panetta in February 2013. On October 18, 2013, Little announced that he would step down on November 15 to spend more time with his family.

He later joined the Brunswick Group to head its corporate data and privacy practice.

== Education ==
Little received his doctorate in international relations, with distinction, from Georgetown University (where he has also served as an adjunct professor of international relations and international law) and his master's and bachelor's degrees from the University of Virginia.

== Personal life ==
His wife, Bethany Little, served as chief education counsel for the chairman of the U.S. Senate Committee on Health, Education, Labor, and Pensions, and now works for EducationCounsel. They have two sons.
