= Monica's Story =

1999 book by Andrew Morton

- Author: Andrew Morton
- Language: English
- Subject: Biography
- Genre: Non-fiction
- Publisher: St. Martin's Press
- Publication date: February 1, 1999
- Publication place: United States
- Media type: Hardcover
- Pages: 288
- ISBN: 0312240910
- OCLC: 40902108

Monica's Story is the authorized biography of Monica Lewinsky, written by Andrew Morton and published in 1999. Morton was also a biographer of Diana, Princess of Wales.

== Reception ==
The book was panned by critics, with Michiko Kakutani of The New York Times calling it "tawdry and tiresome". Katha Pollitt wrote in The New Republic that Morton had tried to cast Lewinsky as "an Oprah-era victim".
