= The Private Lives of the Three Tenors =

1996 book by Marcia Lewis

The Private Lives of the Three Tenors: Behind the Scenes with Plácido Domingo, Luciano Pavarotti, and José Carreras
- Author: Marcia Lewis
- Subject: Biography, Plácido Domingo, Luciano Pavarotti, José Carreras, The Three Tenors
- Publisher: Birch Lane/Carol Publishing
- Publication place: United States
- English publication date: 1996
- Pages: 224
- ISBN: 1-55972-363-7

The Private Lives of the Three Tenors is a gossip biography of The Three Tenors, Plácido Domingo, Luciano Pavarotti, and José Carreras by Marcia Lewis. First published in 1996, the book received high-level publicity during a political scandal that involved Lewis's daughter Monica Lewinsky in 1998, as journalists compared Lewis' "hints" of an affair with popular opera singer, Plácido Domingo, to Lewinsky's then-unproven allegations against U.S. President Bill Clinton. Domingo insisted that he only knew Lewis socially.

== Domingo controversy ==
Media controversy over Plácido Domingo concentrated on an early publicity proposal that Lewis wrote for her book: "How did the author, a glamorous Beverly Hills reporter, formerly with The Hollywood Reporter, get all the inside dope? She denies rumors she and Domingo were more than friends in the 1980s but read the book and see what you think." Her publisher declined to use the proposal. However, soon before the book's release, the New York Post printed a somewhat graphic description of the Domingo rumor, which the paper indicated Lewis "sort of semi-denies". Newsweek staff reporters accused her of apparently starting the rumor herself.

The Washington Post quoted Lewis' publisher as saying that an additional three page "fantasy scene" of what a sexual encounter with the tenor might be like was removed from the final version of the book. The book's editor later recalled: "It was so jarring in relation to the rest of the book. It went from a third-person clip job to a weird romance novel kind of steamy scene. I took it out." In its place is a much pared-down, but nonetheless detailed description of what sort of lovers Spanish "hidalgos" like Domingo supposedly are. Newsweek noted, "It is impossible to know whether the [excised] scene was based on real life." El País, an important Spanish-language newspaper from Domingo's hometown of Madrid, less equivocally claimed in a headline: "Monica's mother invented a romance with Plácido Domingo."

== Contents and reception ==
In addition to her well-publicized focus on Domingo, whom she compared to the Spanish fictional character Don Juan, Lewis also detailed various paparazzi reports of the love lives of his colleagues, José Carreras and Luciano Pavarotti, including the affairs that eventually ended their long-term first marriages. A reporter for Salon.com described the book as "a next-to-the-shampoo-aisle tome filled with gushing, sympathetic accounts of the apparently endless extramarital affairs enjoyed by the golden-throated divos." He added that Lewis and Lewinsky's claims possibly illustrated "one of the more peculiar examples of the adage 'like mother, like daughter' in recent memory." Newsweek likewise suggested that the controversy surrounding the book showed Lewis to be "an interesting role model for her daughter".

== Success and profit ==
Lewis wrote the book over a six month time period and received a salary in the "high five-figures" for it. The book was a moderate success, selling around 20,000 copies in hardback.
