= John Kirby (admiral) =

United States rear admiral (born 1963)

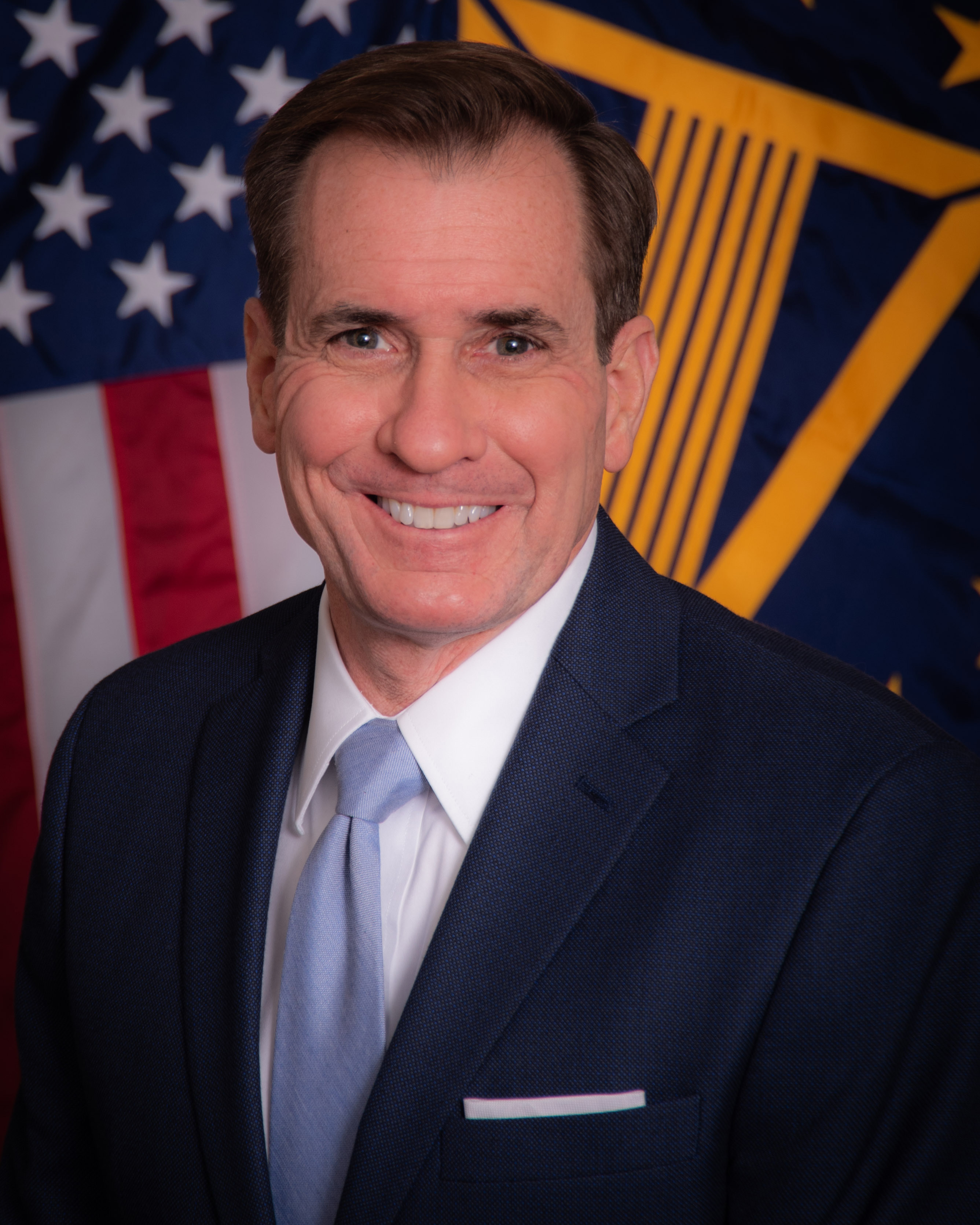
- Official portrait, 2021

White House National Security Communications Advisor (Note: As National Security Council Coordinator for Strategic Communications until February 11, 2024.)
- In office May 28, 2022 – January 20, 2025
- President: Joe Biden
- Preceded by: Saloni Sharma (Note: As National Security Council Strategic Communications Director.)
- Succeeded by: TBC

Pentagon Press Secretary
- In office January 20, 2021 – May 27, 2022
- President: Joe Biden
- Preceded by: Alyssa Farah
- Succeeded by: Patrick S. Ryder
- In office December 2013 – February 2015
- President: Barack Obama
- Preceded by: George E. Little
- Succeeded by: Peter Cook

Assistant to the Secretary of Defense for Public Affairs
- In office January 20, 2021 – May 27, 2022
- President: Joe Biden
- Preceded by: Jonathan Rath Hoffman
- Succeeded by: Chris Meagher

Assistant Secretary of State for Public Affairs
- In office December 11, 2015 – January 20, 2017
- President: Barack Obama
- Preceded by: Douglas Frantz
- Succeeded by: Michelle Giuda

Spokesperson for the United States Department of State
- In office May 13, 2015 – January 20, 2017
- President: Barack Obama
- Preceded by: Jen Psaki
- Succeeded by: Heather Nauert

Personal details
- Born: John F. Kirby; June 3, 1963 (age 63)
- Spouse: Donna
- Children: 2
- Education: University of South Florida (BA); Troy University (MS); Naval War College (MA)

Military service
- Allegiance: United States
- Branch/service: United States Navy
- Years of service: 1986–2015
- Rank: Rear Admiral
- Commands: Chief of Naval Information
- John Kirby's voice Kirby on the humanitarian aid and hostage situation in Gaza, the need for military aid and support for Ukraine against Russian aggression, and acknowledging the Southern border crisis Recorded December 6, 2023

John F. Kirby (born June 3, 1963) is an American retired United States Navy rear admiral, serving as director of the University of Chicago Institute of Politics starting November 2025.

In the Biden administration, he served as United States Department of Defense Press Secretary and Assistant to the Secretary of Defense for Public Affairs from 2021 to 2022 and as White House National Security Communications Advisor from 2022 to 2025. He worked as a military and diplomatic analyst for CNN from 2017 to 2021. In the second Obama administration, he served as United States Department of Defense Press Secretary from 2013 to 2015 and as Spokesperson for the United States Department of State and Assistant Secretary of State for Public Affairs from 2015 to 2017.

== Early life and education ==
Kirby was born on June 3, 1963, and grew up in St. Petersburg, Florida. He is a 1981 graduate of Saint Petersburg Catholic High School, and a 1985 graduate of the University of South Florida in Tampa, Florida, where he earned a Bachelor of Arts in history. He holds a Master of Science in international relations from Troy University and a Master of Arts in national security and strategic studies from the Naval War College.

== Military career ==
Kirby was commissioned in September 1986 after completing Officer Candidate School at Naval Station Newport, Rhode Island. He qualified as a Surface Warfare Officer aboard the guided-missile frigate USS Aubrey Fitch before being designated as a restricted line officer, to serve as a public affairs officer (PAO).

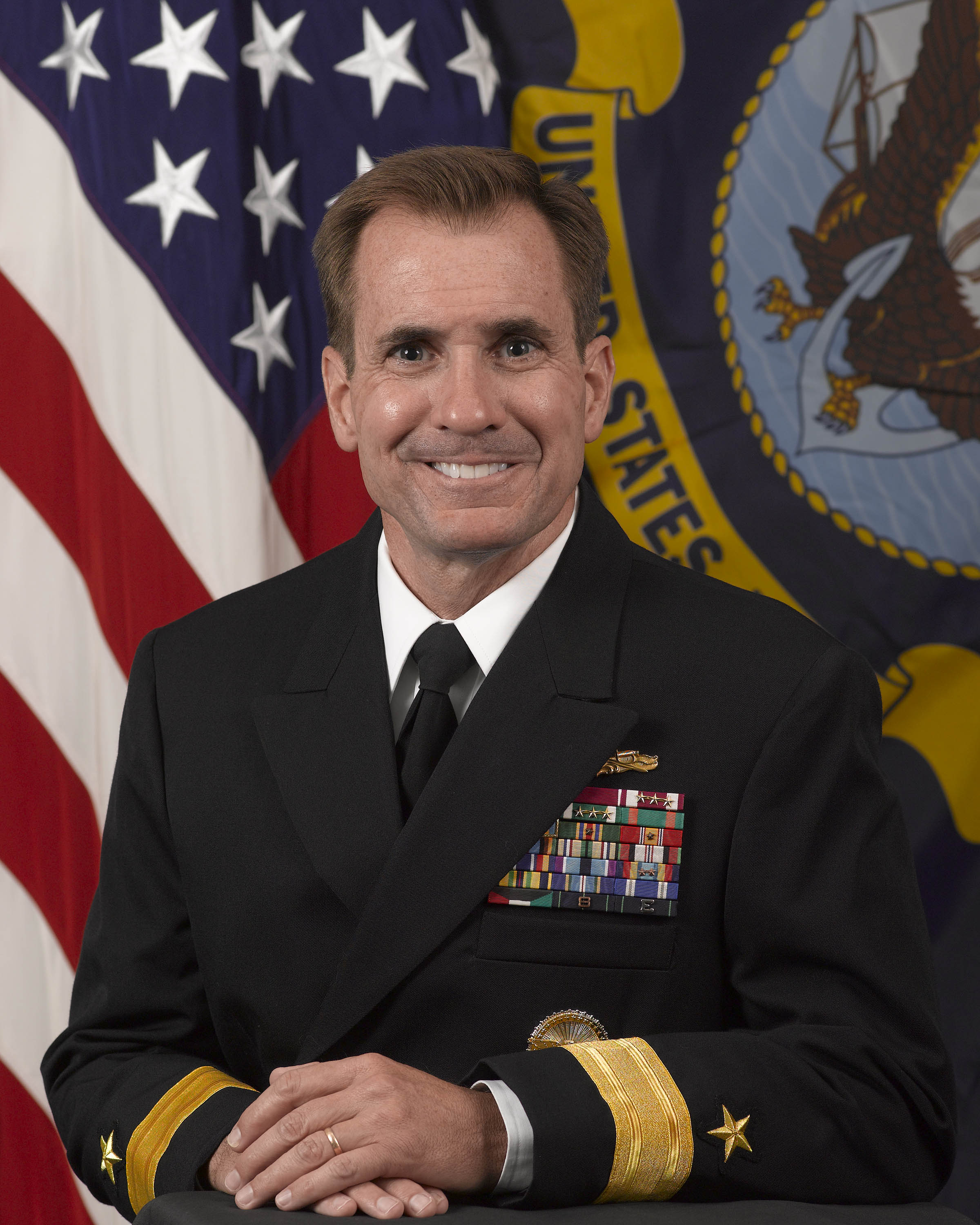
Rear Admiral (lower half) John Kirby while serving as the Navy's chief of information, circa 2012

As a public affairs officer, Kirby served at sea aboard the aircraft carrier USS Forrestal and on the staff of Commander, U.S. 2nd Fleet, embarked aboard the command-and-control ship USS Mount Whitney.

While ashore, Kirby completed tours as an instructor at the U.S. Naval Academy; public affairs officer with the Navy Flight Demonstration Squadron (Blue Angels); editor-in-chief of the Navy's flagship monthly magazine, All Hands; the staffs of the Chief of Naval Personnel, Commander of U.S. Naval Forces Europe, Chief of Naval Operations, and the special assistant for public affairs to the Chairman of the Joint Chiefs of Staff.

He served as the deputy assistant secretary of defense for media operations, serving under the Assistant Secretary of Defense for Public Affairs.

In May 2012, Kirby was promoted to rear admiral (lower half) and served as the U.S. Navy's Chief of Information (CHINFO). As CHINFO, Kirby served as the principal spokesman for the Department of the Navy and provided strategic communication counsel to the Secretary of the Navy and the Chief of Naval Operations. He led the Navy's public affairs community, which consists of more than 2,700 active and reserve officer, enlisted, and civilian communication professionals.

== Career ==
=== Second Obama administration ===
In December 2013, Kirby was appointed Pentagon press secretary by Defense Secretary Chuck Hagel. In May 2014, Kirby was promoted to rear admiral (upper half). In October 2014, Senator John McCain disputed Kirby's contention that the U.S. was winning its war against the Islamic State of Iraq and Syria, and called him an "idiot". On April 22, 2015, it was announced that Kirby would be the new spokesman for the United States Department of State after he retired from the military later in the year.

Kirby became spokesman for the State Department on May 12, 2015. In October 2016, Kirby defended the Saudi-led intervention in the Yemen civil war against the Shia Houthis. He left office following the inauguration of President Trump on January 20, 2017.

=== CNN ===
Throughout the first Trump administration, Kirby worked as a military and foreign policy analyst on CNN from 2017 to 2021.

=== Biden administration ===
On January 14, 2021, Kirby was tapped to reprise his role as Pentagon press secretary by President Joe Biden.

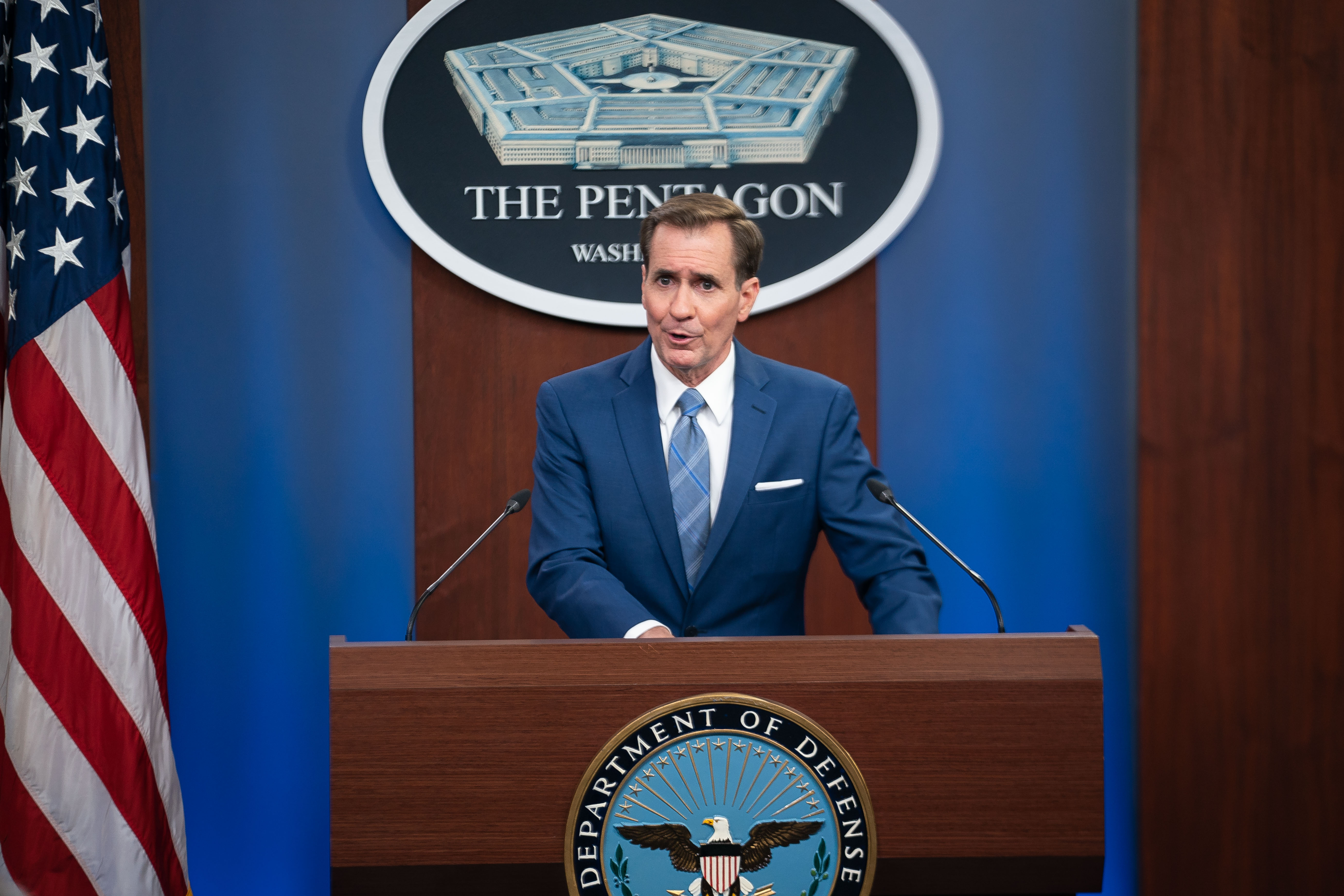
Kirby conducting a press briefing at the Pentagon

On March 11, 2021, Kirby condemned Tucker Carlson for his comments that accommodations for women in uniform, particularly maternity wear and haircut regulations, reduce the readiness and effectiveness of the United States military.

On May 19, 2022, the White House announced that Kirby would be leaving the Pentagon to join the National Security Council as Coordinator for Strategic Communications. In this role, Kirby will "coordinate inter-agency efforts to explain United States policy and will serve as a senior administration voice on related matters". Kirby has stated that “LGBTQ+ rights are human rights" and are "something that's a core part of” United States foreign policy.

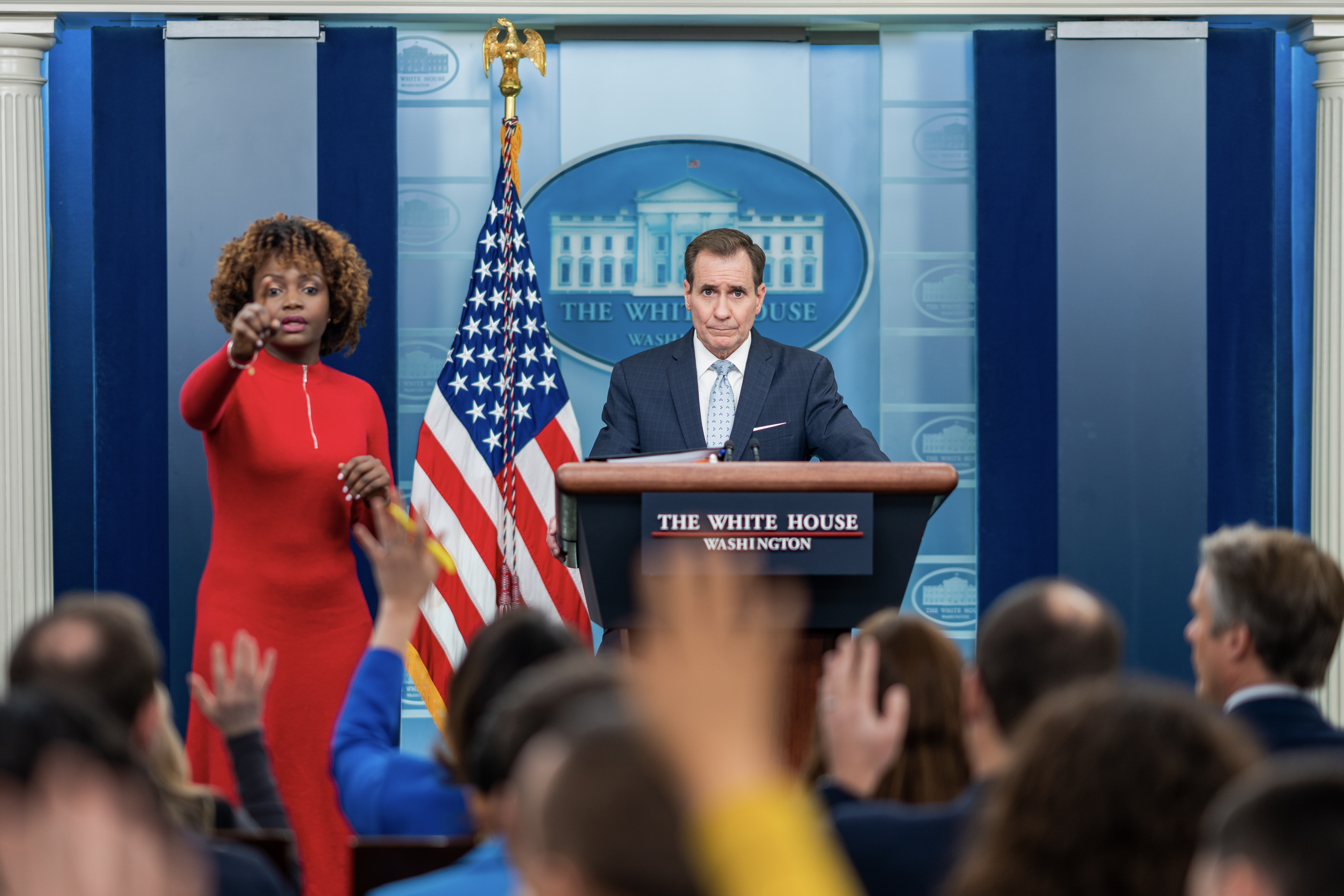
Kirby and Press Secretary Karine Jean-Pierre in February 2023

In November 2023, Kirby dismissed claims that Israel was committing genocide against Palestinians in the Gaza Strip, saying that "Israel is not trying to wipe the Palestinian people off the map. Israel is not trying to wipe Gaza off the map. Israel is trying to defend itself against a genocidal terrorist threat. So if we’re going to start using that word, fine. Let’s use it appropriately."

In January 2024, Kirby rejected calls for a ceasefire in the Gaza war and assured that President Biden "supports Israel being able to defend itself. He supports getting all those hostages out."

In 2023 and 2024, Kirby took over some duties traditionally delegated to White House press secretary Karine Jean-Pierre, frequently joining her in press conferences, taking on media interviews, and answering a wide range of journalist questions. This caused tension and frustration between Kirby and Jean-Pierre.

Kirby resigned his government post at the end of the Biden administration on January 20, 2025. He has since earned money with public-speaking engagements.

=== University of Chicago ===
On October 20, 2025, the University of Chicago announced that Kirby had been appointed as director of the University of Chicago Institute of Politics, succeeding Heidi Heitkamp, effective November 15.

== Awards ==
Kirby has been awarded the Navy Distinguished Service Medal, Defense Superior Service Medal, Legion of Merit, Meritorious Service Medal (four awards), Joint Service Commendation Medal, Navy and Marine Corps Commendation Medal (four awards), and Navy and Marine Corps Achievement Medal, as well as various campaign and service awards.

== Personal life ==
Kirby and his wife, Donna, also a Navy veteran, have two grown children.

== Notes ==
Political offices
Preceded by Douglas Frantz	Assistant Secretary of State for Public Affairs; 2015–2017	Succeeded by Susan N. Stevenson; Acting
Preceded by Jen Psaki	Spokesperson for the United States Department of State; 2015–2017	Succeeded by Mark Toner; Acting
Preceded by Jonathan Rath Hoffman	Assistant to the Secretary of Defense for Public Affairs; 2021–2022	Succeeded by Chris Meagher
Preceded by Alyssa Farah	Pentagon Press Secretary; 2021–2022	Succeeded by Patrick S. Ryder
