= Phil G. Goulding =

American newspaper reporter

Phil G. Goulding (1921–1998) was an American newspaper reporter. During his life, he worked for the government and private companies. In 1965-1967, he served as a Deputy Assistant Secretary of Defense for public affairs, and then, in 1967-69, as an Assistant Secretary of Defense for Public Affairs. After retiring from the government, he started anew in the oil industry as an executive and became a book author.

== Early life and career ==
Goulding was born in San Francisco, California, in 1921. He graduated from Hamilton College. He was a low-ranking naval officer during World War II, serving in the Pacific and the Atlantic and participating in the Normandy landings. After the war, in 1947, he became a reporter for The Plain Dealer (Cleveland, Ohio) and after learning the ropes, worked in the newspaper's Washington Bureau (1950-1965).

In 1965, he joined the Office of Public Affairs of the U.S. Defense Department, and in 1967 was promoted to Assistant Secretary of Defense for Public Affairs (1967–69). Goulding was confirmed by the United States Senate Committee on Armed Services, and served from 28 February 1967 till 20 January 1969. His predecessor was Arthur Sylvester (20 January 19613-February 1967). Daniel Z. Henkin served after Goulding's retirement (20 January 1969 – 20 January 1973).

== Journalistic integrity ==
As an official Pentagon spokesman in the mid-1960s, and chief spokesman for the Defense Department from 1967, Goulding often provided press briefings at the Pentagon with respect to the Vietnam War, including reorganizations and changes brought by Robert McNamara. He had to deal with many uneasy issues, including the USS Liberty incident, since President Johnson chose not to make any public statements.

Some information that he relayed to the public regarding military operations in south-east Asia was inaccurate, though never intentionally, which he later acknowledged. He was quoted in his New York Times's obituary as saying,

I misled and misinformed the American people a good many times in a good many ways -- through my own lack of foresight, through carelessness, through relaying incomplete information which the originators considered complete, through transmitting reports which had been falsified, deliberately, at lower levels."

== Later life and writing ==
After leaving the U.S. military in 1969, he became a successful oil-industry executive. While a scholar in residence at the Aspen Institute for Humanistic Studies he authored of a book in 1970 about the nature of his experiences in providing public information in the context of national security, titled Confirm or Deny: Informing the People on National Security. The book was positively reviewed.

In his later years, he wrote and lectured about classical music, including authoring the popular music appreciation books Classical Music: The 50 Greatest Composers and Their 1,000 Greatest Works, published in 1992, and Ticket to the Opera: Discovering and Exploring 100 Famous Works, History, Lore, and Singers, published in 1996. Both works met with positive reviews, with reviewers calling his books about his musical experiences funny, entertaining, succinct and informative.

== Death ==
Goulding died of cancer at his home in Potomac, Maryland on September 8, 1998 at age 77. U.S. Department of Defense released a statement saying,

Phil Goulding was highly regarded in public affairs circles. His book, Confirm or Deny: Informing the People on National Security, should be required reading for anyone who aspires to a leadership position in government. Drawing on his wide experience reporting national security issues, Phil Goulding brought a probing mind, an articulate voice and absolute integrity to the job of Pentagon spokesman during the Vietnam era. Many of us who have subsequently stood at the Pentagon podium have benefited from his insights about a difficult, eventful time.
