= Jonathan Rath Hoffman =

American attorney, politician, and government official

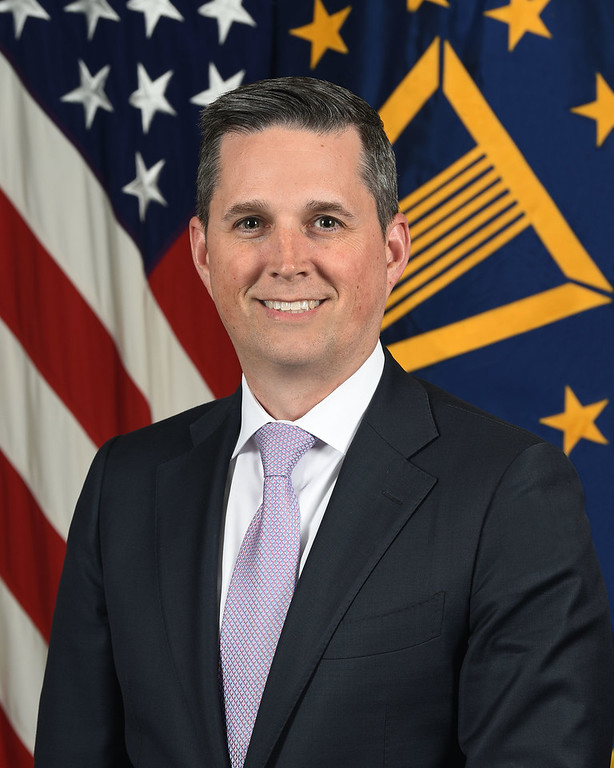

Assistant to the Secretary of Defense for Public Affairs
- In office May 20, 2019 – January 20, 2021
- President: Donald Trump
- Preceded by: Dana W. White
- Succeeded by: John Kirby

Personal details
- Party: Republican
- Education: University of Richmond (BA); University of Virginia (JD)

Jonathan Rath Hoffman is an American attorney, politician, and government official who served as the assistant to the secretary of defense for public affairs from May 2019 to January 2021. In the role, Hoffman advised the secretary and deputy secretary of defense on issues related to strategic communications, community engagement, and media relations.

== Education ==
Hoffman earned a Bachelor of Arts degree from the University of Richmond and a Juris Doctor from the University of Virginia School of Law.

== Career ==
After law school, Hoffman taught military justice and immigration law courses at The Citadel. Hoffman served in the United States Department of Homeland Security during the George W. Bush administration as deputy assistant secretary of homeland security for intergovernmental affairs. He was also the director of international programs and border security policy on the United States Homeland Security Council. He additionally served in the United States Department of State and U.S. Customs and Border Protection. Hoffman was a Republican candidate in the 2013 South Carolina 1st congressional district special election. Hoffman placed 12th in a crowded Republican primary field of 16 total candidates.

During the Trump administration, Hoffman served as the assistant secretary of homeland security for public affairs before being nominated as assistant to the secretary of defense for public affairs on May 20, 2019.
