= Lawrence Di Rita =

American political aide (born 1958)

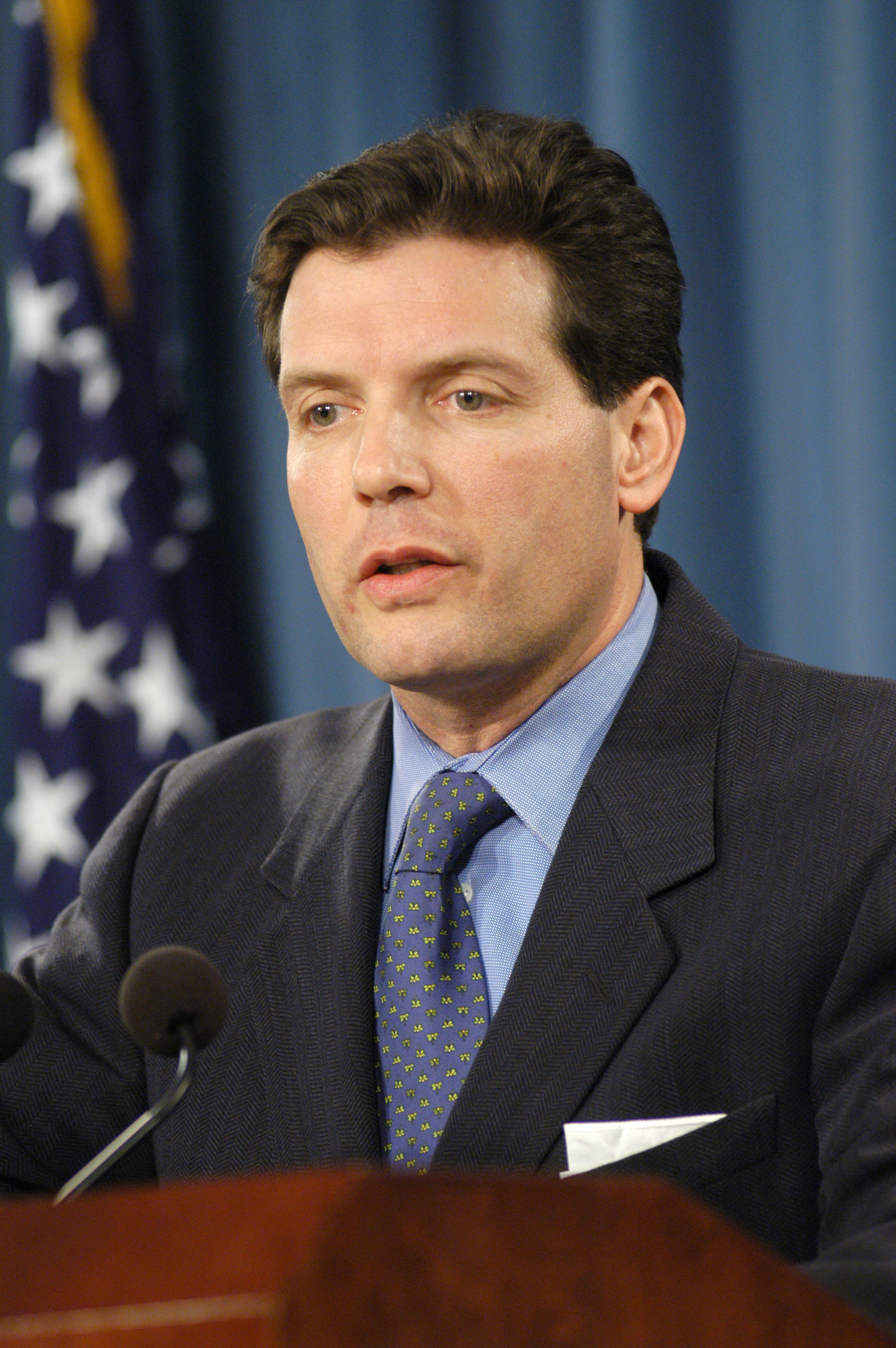
- Di Rita in 2005

Assistant to the Secretary of Defense for Public Affairs
- Acting
- In office August 10, 2003 – September 22, 2005
- President: George W. Bush
- Preceded by: Victoria Clarke
- Succeeded by: J. Dorrance Smith

Personal details
- Born: March 12, 1958 (age 68) Detroit, Michigan, U.S.
- Education: United States Naval Academy (BS); Johns Hopkins University (MA)

Lawrence Thomas Di Rita (born March 12, 1958) is an American political advisor who served as an aide to United States Secretary of Defense Donald Rumsfeld. He has also worked as a spokesman for Bank of America.

== Early life and education ==
Born in Detroit, Michigan, Di Rita received a Bachelor of Science degree from the United States Naval Academy in 1980 and a Master of Arts degree from the Johns Hopkins University School of Advanced International Studies in 1987.

== Career ==
He served as a United States Navy officer until 1994, at which time Di Rita joined The Heritage Foundation as Deputy Director of Foreign Policy and Defense Studies. Di Rita was policy director to the 1996 Presidential campaign of U.S. Senator Phil Gramm and Chief of Staff for U.S. Senator Kay Bailey Hutchison from 1996 until 2001.

Di Rita served as acting Assistant Secretary of Defense for Public Affairs and U.S. Department of Defense spokesmen under Secretary Rumsfeld. Reportedly, he was slated to become Secretary of the Army but his nomination was scuttled due to opposition in the United States Senate. His prior position was Special Assistant to Rumsfeld. Throughout his time in the Pentagon, Di Rita was considered the Defense Secretary's right-hand aide. Even after Rumsfeld's resignation, Di Rita was authorized by Rumsfeld to speak on his behalf to TIME magazine regarding matters such as Rumsfeld's current plans and activities.

In February 2001, he was one of the first to join Rumsfeld's Pentagon staff. In addition to handling legislative relations, press relations, and special projects for the Defense Secretary, Di Rita was also a regular squash opponent of Rumsfeld. He left the Department of Defense and joined Bank of America in May 2006.

After the fall of the regime of Saddam Hussein in 2003, Di Rita was assigned to assist retired Army general Jay Garner, Director of the Office of Reconstruction and Humanitarian Affairs (ORHA) in Iraq. He spent nearly two months in Baghdad helping Garner and ORHA lay the foundation for the arrival of Ambassador L. Paul Bremer and the Coalition Provisional Authority. Di Rita returned to Washington and the Department of Defense, where he assumed the responsibilities as chief Pentagon spokesman and head of DoD Public Affairs. He later served as Counsellor to the Department of Defense, prior to his departure to the private sector.

Lawrence Di Rita has a column in the National Review Online.
