= Alexi McCammond =

American political journalist

- Born: 1993 (age 32–33); Rockford, Illinois
- Education: B.A. University of Chicago
- Occupation: Journalist

Alexi Jo McCammond (born 1993) is an American political journalist. She has served as a reporter for the political website Axios and an opinions editor for The Washington Post. She has also been an NBC and MSNBC contributor and a contributor for PBS's Washington Week.

== Education ==
McCammond attended Guilford High School in Rockford, Illinois. In 2011, she attended the University of Chicago on a full 4-year QuestBridge scholarship, graduating in 2015, with a B.A. in sociology and Spanish language and literature. She received additional training from the National Association of Black Journalists. While at the University of Chicago, McCammond also wrote for student political newspaper The Gate. At the university, she was a member of Kappa Alpha Theta sorority. She is of mixed ethnic descent.

== Career ==
McCammond started her career as a freelance political writer for the women's magazine Cosmopolitan and later left to become a news editor at women's online news magazine Bustle. She joined the website Axios in 2017. McCammond wrote about Michael Bloomberg's withdrawal from the 2020 Democratic primary race in March 2020 as well as leaked presidential schedules revealing that 60% of Donald Trump's days were devoted to "executive time" while he was president.

In November 2019, McCammond accused former NBA star and TNT commentator Charles Barkley of threatening her in an Atlanta bar prior to the 2020 Democratic primary debate in Atlanta, Georgia. McCammond reported that, after she commented to Barkley and someone who had joined their conversation that a Barkley remark was contrary to what he had said to her outside the third person's presence, he replied, "I don’t hit women, but if I did I would hit you." Although McCammond never revealed any threat Barkley had made to her, he later issued a public apology for his remark, which was an "attempted joke that was not funny at all." McCammond replied on Twitter without saying she accepted or appreciated the apology, implying that she equated Barkley's comment to actually being "hit or threatened. . . ," and stating her opinion that the remark was "not a joke. . ." and that it was a product of what she called "the culture of misogyny. . . ."

McCammond received further media attention related to her relationship with TJ Ducklo, a member of the Biden 2020 campaign, while she covered the campaign. Ducklo, White House deputy press secretary under President Biden, resigned for harassing female Politico reporter Tara Palmeri. Ducklo reportedly made "derogatory and misogynistic comments" toward Palmeri during a phone call and accused her of being "jealous" of his relationship with McCammond. The couple publicly announced their relationship on February 8, 2021. On February 12, Ducklo was suspended without pay and apologized. Under pressure from the Vanity Fair article that reported the matter, Ducklo resigned the next day from his White House position.

In March 2021, McCammond was selected as editor in chief of Conde Nast's Teen Vogue. After the appointment, a series of racist, bigoted and homophobic tweets that McCammond posted a decade earlier resurfaced. She apologized to the staff of Teen Vogue. Several media makers of Asian descent called for McCammond's removal, citing racism against Asians in the U.S. fashion industry and a rise in anti-Asian violence during the COVID-19 pandemic. Former Teen Vogue editor Elaine Welteroth called the tweets and the feelings behind them "racist and abhorrent and indefensible." More than twenty members of the staff voiced concern internally and to the press. In response, Ulta Beauty paused $1 million in advertising in the online-only publication, and McCammond resigned from the position prior to starting.

McCammond rejoined Axios in July 2021 serving as a political reporter. In August 2023, she joined The Washington Post as an opinion editor. In July 2024, she faced criticism for an Instagram post about her ex-boyfriend Ducklo, "my toxic ex who works for the Biden campaign and has to play cleanup after that disastrous debate." Soon after, she announced her departure from the Post.

== Awards prior to controversies ==
McCammond received the 2019 Emerging Journalist Award from the National Association of Black Journalists and was on 2020's Forbes 30 Under 30 list.

== Personal life ==
McCammond is biracial; her father is African American and her mother is white. In 2023, she wrote, in an opinion piece for the Philadelphia Tribune:

For so long I’ve silently struggled to feel entitled to own my Blackness.... Black beauty wasn’t embraced or explored in our house growing up. My dad worked all the time and was not particularly available, so that left my mom. She straightened and relaxed and dyed my thick, brown, curly hair. My mom is genuinely so out of touch that during one visit to the National Museum of African American History and Culture, she stopped random Black people to apologize ... for ... slavery? Oppression? Her outfit? I’m still not sure. (But I am certain that the memory remains just as excruciating for me.)
