= Chris Meagher =

American political advisor

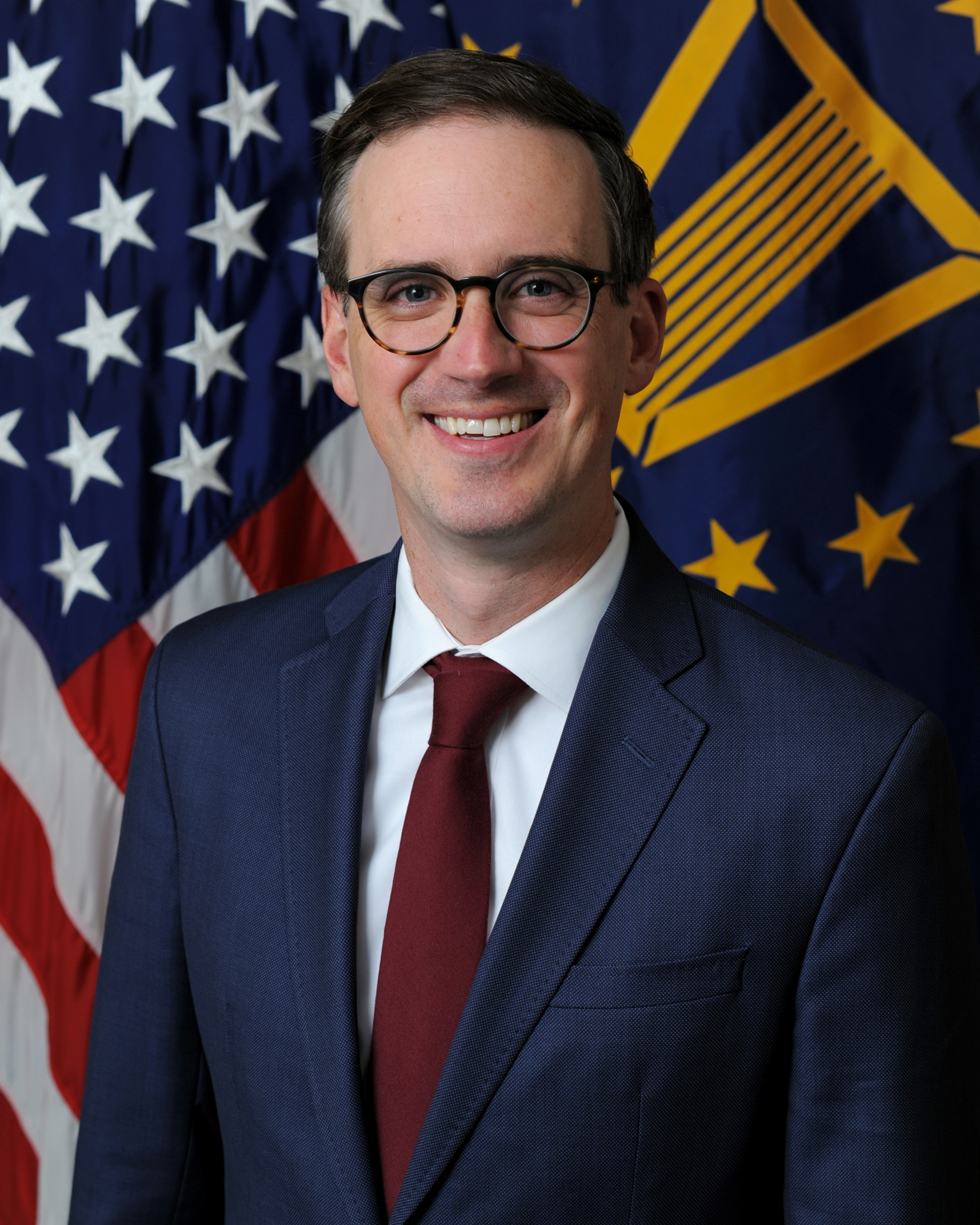

Assistant to the Secretary of Defense for Public Affairs
- In office September 9, 2022 – January 20, 2025
- President: Joe Biden
- Preceded by: John Kirby
- Succeeded by: Sean Parnell

White House Deputy Press Secretary
- In office March 1, 2021 – September 9, 2022 Serving with Karine Jean-Pierre (Note: as Principal White House Deputy Press Secretary) & Andrew Bates
- President: Joe Biden
- Leader: Jen Psaki; Karine Jean-Pierre
- Preceded by: TJ Ducklo
- Succeeded by: Emilie Simons

Personal details
- Party: Democratic
- Education: Michigan State University (BA); Santa Barbara and Ventura Colleges of Law (JD)

Chris Meagher is an American political advisor for former President Joe Biden. He was previously appointed to serve as Assistant to the Secretary of Defense for Public Affairs under Secretary of Defense Lloyd Austin on September 9, 2022. He previously served as a White House Deputy Press Secretary in the Biden administration beginning March 1, 2021, succeeding TJ Ducklo. He also served as a senior public affairs official for Secretary of Transportation Pete Buttigieg.

== Early life and education ==
A native of Michigan, Meagher earned a Bachelor of Arts degree in journalism from Michigan State University. He then earned a Juris Doctor from the Santa Barbara & Ventura Colleges of Law.

== Career ==
Meagher began his career as a journalist, working for WILX-TV, The State News, The Modesto Bee, the Santa Barbara Daily Sound, and the Santa Barbara Independent. He then became the communications director for Congresswoman Lois Capps. Meagher was also a communications manager for General Motors and served as a senior communications advisor for the Colorado Democratic Party and Montana Democratic Party. In 2018, Meagher worked on Senator Jon Tester's re-election campaign as communications director. From March to June 2020, Meagher was briefly a communications advisor for Michigan Governor Gretchen Whitmer.

Meagher previously worked as the national press secretary for the Pete Buttigieg 2020 presidential campaign and joined the United States Department of Transportation as deputy director of public affairs in February 2021 after Buttigieg was confirmed as secretary.

Meagher was one of four aides who hid Defense Secretary Lloyd Austin's hospitalization from the public.
