= Kenneth Bacon =

American journalist (1944–2009)

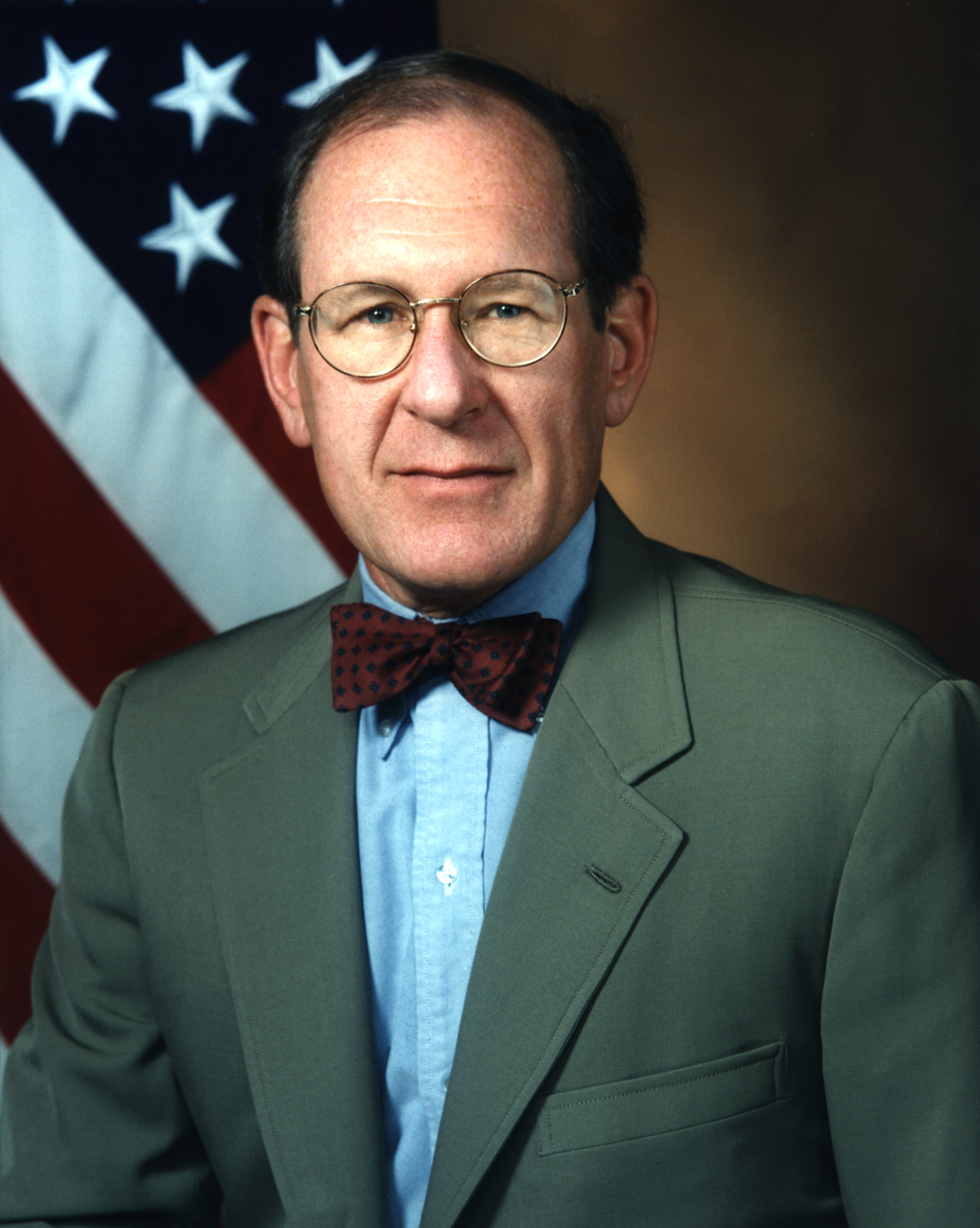
- Kenneth Bacon, 1998

Assistant Secretary of Defense for Public Affairs
- In office September 20, 1994 – January 19, 2001
- Preceded by: Kathleen deLaski
- Succeeded by: Victoria Clarke

Personal details
- Born: Kenneth Hogate Bacon; November 21, 1944 Bronxville, New York, U.S.
- Died: August 15, 2009 (aged 64) Block Island, Rhode Island, U.S.
- Spouse: Darcy Wheeler
- Children: 2
- Education: Amherst College; Columbia University
- Occupation: Journalist

Military service
- Allegiance: United States
- Branch/service: United States Army
- Years of service: 1968–1974
- Unit: U.S. Army Reserve

Kenneth Hogate Bacon (November 21, 1944 – August 15, 2009) was an American journalist who served as a spokesman for the Department of Defense during the Presidency of Bill Clinton, and later as president of Refugees International, an organization advocating for displaced persons and solutions for displacement crises.

== Early life and career ==
Bacon was born in Bronxville, New York. He attended Phillips Exeter Academy in Exeter, New Hampshire, for high school, graduating in 1962; the school honored him in 2007 with its John Phillips Award, which recognizes graduates for their contributions to society. He earned his undergraduate degree at Amherst College, where his father was a dean and also taught political science. After Amherst, Bacon received post-graduate education at Columbia University, where he earned simultaneous master's degrees in business and journalism.

Bacon served in the U.S. Army Reserve from 1968 to 1974. After two years working in the office of U.S. Senator Thomas J. McIntyre (D–NH) as a legislative assistant, he was hired by The Wall Street Journal (WSJ) as a reporter (1965). He was assigned to the paper's bureau in Washington, D.C., working his way up to become a columnist and editor.

== Spokesman at Defense Department ==
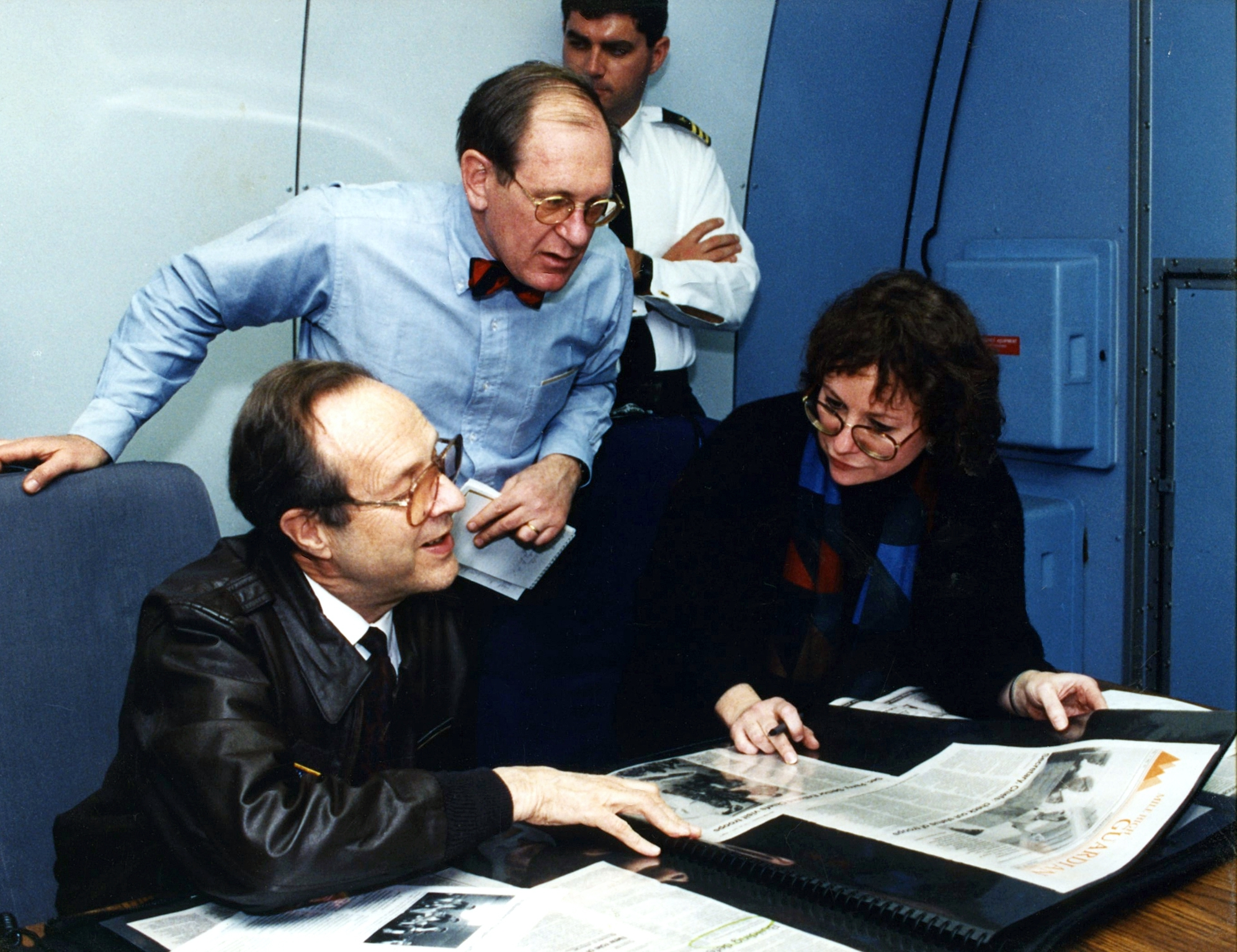
Bacon and Secretary of Defense William J. Perry during a flight to Europe, 1995

William Perry, who had served as US Undersecretary of Defense in the 1970s and had become familiar with WSJ reporter Bacon while in that capacity, was named to serve as Secretary of Defense in the Clinton Administration in 1994. He invited Bacon to serve as Assistant Secretary of Defense for Public Affairs, serving as the public face of the Defense Department.

In 1997 Bacon was retained in his post by Perry's successor at the Defense Department, William Cohen. As part of NATO's involvement in the Kosovo War, Bacon represented the Defense Department on a visit to the Balkans in 1999 with Cohen, which included visiting a refugee camp. Bacon later said he had never before realized "the sheer magnitude of one million people leaving their homes and needing food, shelter and medical care" and then returning to their homes after the cessation of hostilities and wondered if [those who had assisted] Kosovar refugees could "give the same attention to the refugees in the Congo, Afghanistan and Sudan".

=== Linda Tripp incident ===
In March 1998, Bacon released details of employee Linda Tripp's personnel file to a reporter, disclosing that Tripp had omitted on her employment application an incident that occurred when she was arrested for theft when she was 19 years old. Tripp, a Defense Department employee, had been a friend of Monica Lewinsky, who had herself worked as an assistant in Bacon's office in 1996 and 1997 (having been hired on the recommendation of the White House). Bacon was criticized for violating privacy laws and harming Tripp's reputation. In response to a Defense Department Inspector General's report in 2000 that concluded that Bacon had not followed authorized procedures, William Cohen published a letter that had been sent to Bacon in which Bacon's actions were called "hasty and ill-conceived". Bacon issued a statement that the information he released was driven by "a desire to be responsive to an urgent media inquiry" and that the Inspector General's two-year investigation did not find any connection to the White House. In a 2003 settlement, following a lawsuit which claimed that the revelations violated the Privacy Act of 1974, Tripp received a payment of $595,000, retroactive promotion and salary increases for the years 1998 to 2000 and the right to reapply for government employment.

== Refugees International ==
Bacon said he recognized that becoming a refugee was a matter of circumstance that could affect anyone, noting that his own "blue-blooded WASP" ancestors were refugees themselves, who "came over from England in 1630, fleeing debts for all I know".

After leaving his government post in 2001, Bacon became president of Refugees International, which asks world leaders to assist the millions worldwide who have fled their homes due to violence or persecution. The organization regularly advises and lobbies government and UN agencies, including peacekeeping bodies. Bacon focused much of his work on advocating for additional protection and assistance to displaced people from Sudan's Darfur region and Iraq. He also drew attention to displaced people in Afghanistan, Burma, the Democratic Republic of Congo, Colombia and Thailand. During Bacon's tenure as president of Refugees International, the organization doubled in size.

In the weeks before the 2003 invasion of Iraq, Bacon suggested such methods as selection of bombing targets outside of densely populated areas as a means to reduce the number of refugees. In September 2003, Bacon encouraged French participation in the peacekeeping forces in Iraq, based on that nation's prior experience in such circumstances. Emphasizing that "the US cannot afford to win the military battle and lose the humanitarian campaign" in Iraq, Bacon advocated for increased numbers of Iraqi refugees to be allowed to enter the United States and for greater American financial assistance to refugees from violence in Iraq, with funding from the State Department rising from $43 million in 2006 to $398 million in 2008.

Five days before his death (August 10), Refugees International announced that Bacon had endowed a new program to focus on people displaced by climate change.

== Personal life ==
Bacon wrote an essay about health care reform from his own perspective as a cancer patient, a "matter of life and death" for him, that was published in The Washington Post 25 days before his death. His recommendations included prevention and online efficiencies, citing his own example of melanoma that could have been treatable if caught earlier given a family history of the condition. He described difficulties in obtaining approval for payment of radiation therapy for cancer that had spread to his brain, which his insurer had deemed "not medically necessary", and expressed frustration with the amount of time he and his physician had to spend in dealing with paperwork.

He served as chairman of the Folger Shakespeare Library and was a member of the Council on Foreign Relations and the International Institute for Strategic Studies.

=== Death ===
A resident of Washington, D.C., Bacon died at age 64 of complications related to melanoma, at his second home on Block Island, Rhode Island. He and his wife of 43 years, the former Darcy Wheeler, had two daughters.
