= Tara Palmeri =

American journalist (born 1987)

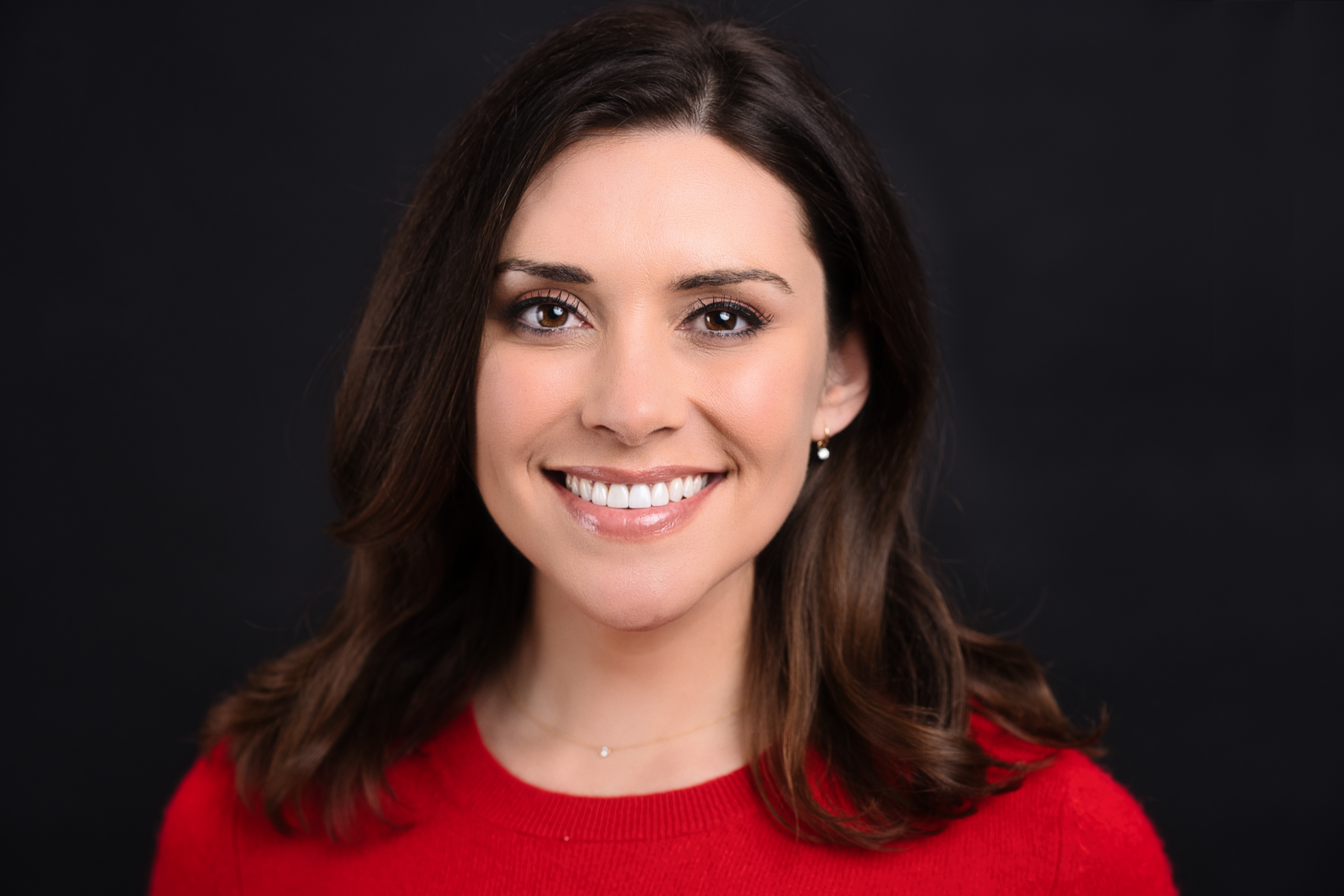
- Born: September 1, 1987 (age 39); New York, U.S.
- Citizenship: American; Polish
- Education: American University (BA)
- Occupation: Journalist
- Years active: 2009–present
- Website: Official website

Tara Palmeri (born September 1, 1987) is an American journalist. She has worked at news organizations including ABC News, Politico, Puck, New York Post and Washington Examiner. Palmeri hosts The Tara Palmeri Show on Youtube and writes The Red Letter newsletter. She has also hosted podcasts such as "Broken: Seeking Justice", "Power: The Maxwells" and "Somebody's Gotta Win".

== Biography ==
Palmeri was born on September 1, 1987, in New York. She is a 2005 graduate of DePaul Catholic High School in Wayne, New Jersey. She attended American University and graduated with a bachelor's degree in Public Communication in 2008.

== Career ==
Palmeri started her career at CNN as a news assistant in the D.C. bureau in 2009.

She subsequently joined the Washington Examiner where she co-wrote a daily column called "Yeas & Nays".

She moved to New York in 2010 when she was hired by the New York Post to write for Page Six. She also worked as a general assignment reporter and first reported the news of Chris Christie's weight loss surgery.

Politico hired her to cover European politics from Brussels in 2015. After the 2016 presidential election, Politico reassigned her to Washington as a White House reporter covering the Trump administration. During her tenure, White House Press Secretary Sean Spicer called Palmeri "an idiot with no real sources."

CNN announced in 2017 that Palmeri was hired as a political analyst for the network, while continuing to cover President Trump for Politico.

Palmeri was hired by ABC News as a full-time White House correspondent in October 2017.

After ABC, she hosted investigative podcasts for Sony about Jeffrey Epstein and the wealthy family of Ghislaine Maxwell.

Palmeri left ABC News and re-joined Politico to work as a co-author of its newsletter Playbook in 2021.

According to Vanity Fair, Biden White House Deputy Press Secretary TJ Ducklo had threatened Palmeri, telling her he would "destroy her" if she published a story about his relationship with Alexi McCammond, an NBC, MSNBC and Axios reporter. Ducklo during a phone call also reportedly made "derogatory and misogynistic comments" towards Palmeri and accused her of being "jealous" of his relationship with McCammond. On February 12, 2021, Ducklo was suspended without pay by the White House for one week. The following day, Ducklo resigned from his White House position over the matter.

In 2022, Palmeri joined the journalism startup Puck as a senior political columnist. At Puck, Palmeri broke the news that Nancy Pelosi would resign as Speaker of the House after the 2022 midterm elections. She also hosted the election-themed podcast, “Somebody’s Gotta Win,” a collaboration between Puck and Spotify’s The Ringer. It ended in April 2025.

She left Puck in March 2025 to move to her YouTube channel. Palmeri has a newsletter called The Red Letter.

She was named to the Shorenstein Center on Media, Politics and Public Policy 2026–2027 class of fellows at the Harvard Kennedy School.

Palmeri is a Sine Faculty Fellow for Public Administration and Policy at American University.

== Awards ==
In 2021, Washingtonian named her as one of the most powerful women in Washington.
