= Victoria Clarke =

American communications consultant

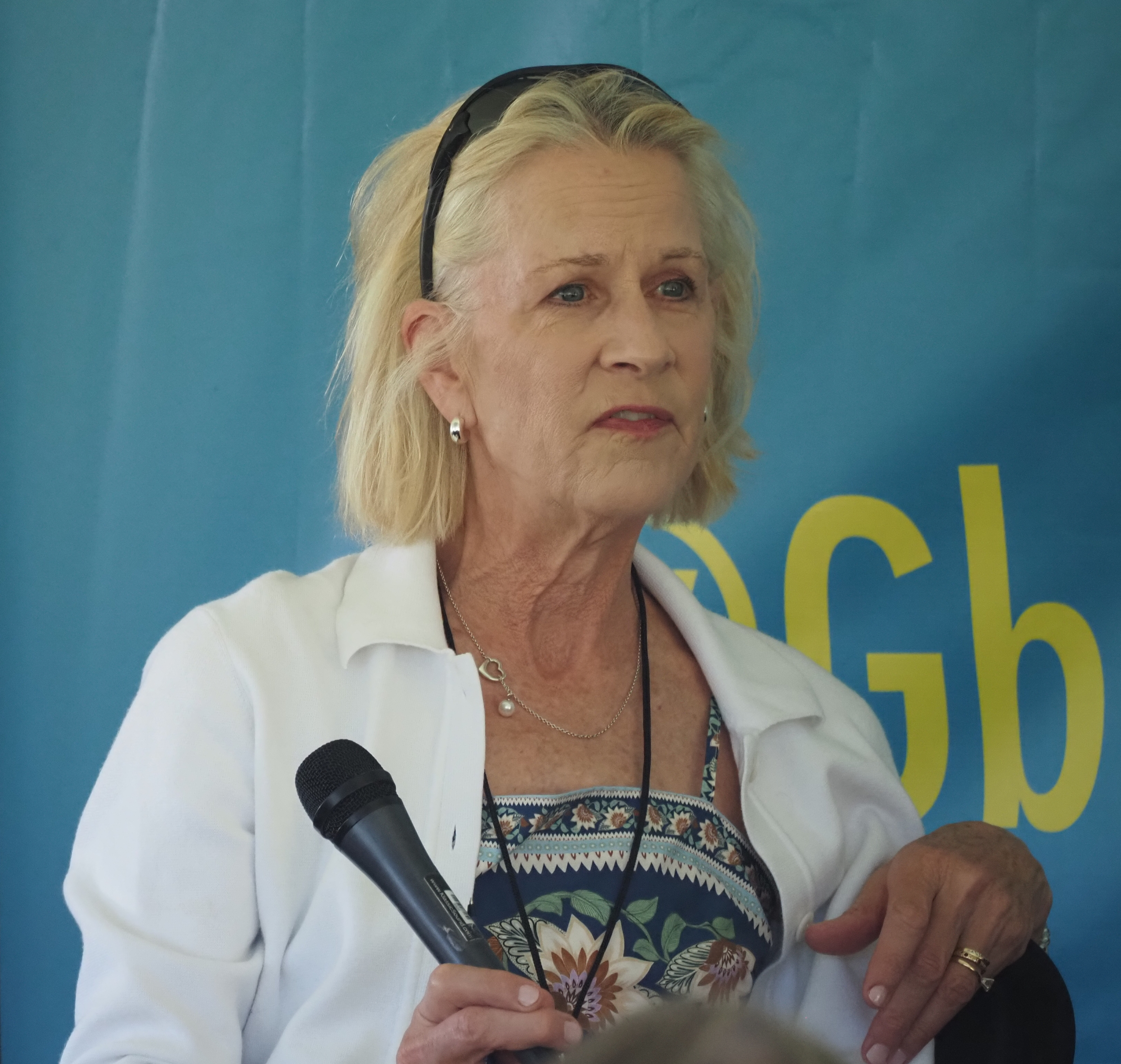

Assistant Secretary of Defense for Public Affairs
- In office May 22, 2001 – June 20, 2003
- President: George W. Bush
- Preceded by: Kenneth Bacon
- Succeeded by: Lawrence Di Rita (Acting)

Personal details
- Born: May 18, 1959 (age 67) Pittsburgh, Pennsylvania, U.S.
- Party: Republican
- Education: George Washington University (BA)

Victoria "Torie" Clarke (born May 18, 1959) is an American communications consultant who has served in several private sector positions and in three Republican presidential administrations, most notably as the Assistant Secretary of Defense for Public Affairs under Donald Rumsfeld.

She is a frequent guest on the roundtable on ABC News' This Week with George Stephanopoulos. On May 20, 2008, she made her first appearance on The Tony Kornheiser Show, on which she continues to be featured regularly as a rotating co-host.

== Early life and education ==
Born in Pittsburgh, Pennsylvania, to Dr. and Mrs. Charles E. Clarke, Clarke graduated from George Washington University with a Bachelor of Arts degree in journalism.

== Career ==
Clarke began her career as a photographer for the Washington Star. She was president of Bozell Eskew Advertising, vice president of the National Cable & Telecommunications Association, and the Washington office director for the public-relations firm of Hill & Knowlton. Clarke has served as the press secretary to Senator John McCain and held positions on the staff of Presidents Ronald Reagan and George H. W. Bush. She subsequently moved to the Pentagon to serve as the Assistant Secretary of Defense for Public Affairs during President George W. Bush's first term in office, under Secretary of Defense Donald Rumsfeld. Clarke worked as the Senior Advisor of Communications and Government Relations for Comcast Corporation before moving to SAP AG to take the role of Head of Corporate Affairs.

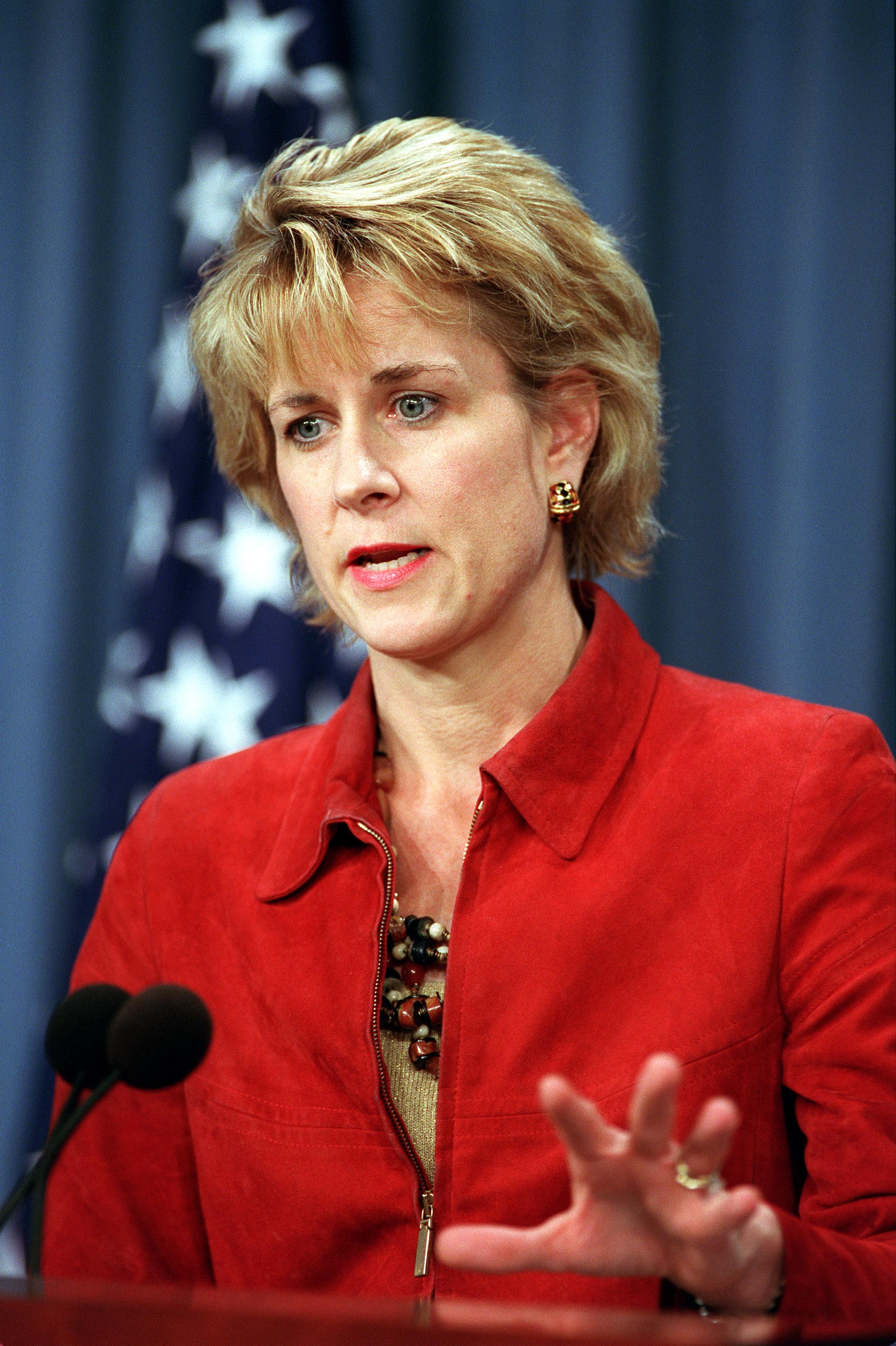
Clarke briefs reporters at the Pentagon in 2001, five weeks after the 9/11 attacks

Clarke has been a close colleague of Mary Matalin since the Reagan administration. Clarke often filled in for Matalin on the show Equal Time during its run on CNBC in the 1990s. Clarke is the author of Lipstick on a Pig: Winning In the No-Spin Era by Someone Who Knows the Game (2006, ISBN 0-7432-7116-5), a book about tackling 21st century information challenges. Clarke appeared on the February 7, 2006, episode of The Daily Show to promote it.

== Personal life ==
Clarke is a Republican. She is married to J. Brian Graham, a Democrat. She is the mother of two sons, Colin and Charlie, and a daughter, Devan, who is an equestrian. Her sister, Caitlin Clarke, was an actress who died in 2004. She and her family live in suburban Washington, D.C. in the Salmon-Stohlman House.

In the 2020 United States presidential election, Clarke endorsed Joe Biden.
