= Puck (media company) =

Digital media company

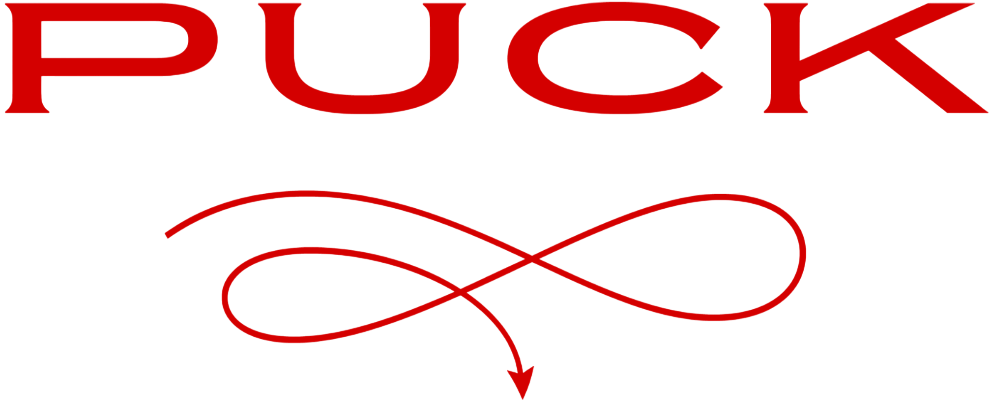
- Industry: Digital media
- Founded: August 2021; 5 years ago
- Key people: Sarah Personette (CEO); Jon Kelly (Editor-in-Chief)
- Subsidiaries: Air Mail
- Website: puck.news

Puck is an American digital media company founded in 2021. It covers the 'four centers of power' in the United States: Silicon Valley, Hollywood, Washington, D.C. and Wall Street. Its journalists include Matthew Belloni, Peter Hamby, Dylan Byers and Baratunde Thurston.

== History ==
Puck was founded by Joe Purzycki, Jon Kelly, Liz Gough, Julia Ioffe, Max Tcheyan, and Peter Hamby. The company takes its name from the 19th century political satire and humor magazine of the same title, which was headquartered in the Puck Building in Manhattan. The company launched its landing page in August 2021 and debuted in whole in September 2021. In 2021, the company received $7 million in funding from Standard Industries and TPG Growth. Purzycki stepped down as CEO of the company in May 2023. On January 5, 2024, Sarah Personette, the former head of ad sales at Twitter, was announced as the company's CEO.

Puck debuted a series of podcasts hosted by its writers in September 2021. In March 2022, the outlet debuted a podcast co-created by Bill Simmons' The Ringer, which is owned by Spotify.

In August 2023, editor-in-chief Jon Kelly told Axios that the company raised over $10 million in Series B funding. Puck launched its first-ever live conference events in October 2023, holding an event with former White House Chief of Staff Ron Klain at the Top of the Hay in Washington, D.C. Events with Netflix's Bela Bajaria and Goldman Sachs' David M. Solomon are scheduled for later in 2023.

In March 2025, Tara Palmeri left Puck to do reporting on YouTube.

In September 2025, Puck entered an agreement to acquire the weekly fine-culture and lifestyle newsletter, Air Mail. The following month Saks Global sued Puck, Saks Global accused Puck of running “hit pieces” on the group and failing to disclose a supposed conflict of interest between Puck reporter William D. Cohan and Saks Global.

=== Notable stories and coverage ===
In a 2022 profile, The New Yorker described Puck's editorial tone as being "deliberately clubby," with part of the appeal for readers being that "its writers move in the same elevated spaces as the people whom they cover." Bloomberg News described Puck as a company that "treats reporters like social media influencers".

Following FTX founder Sam Bankman-Fried's arrest, Bankman-Fried was interviewed by Puck during his house arrest. Puck has reported on Bankman-Fried's political aspirations prior to his arrest, reporting in September 2023 that he had intended to donate between $15 million to $30 million to Senate Minority Leader Mitch McConnell.

In August 2023, Puck reported on a falling out between Canadian singer Justin Bieber and his longtime manager Scooter Braun. While both parties denied rumors that Bieber was searching for new management, Puck stood by its report. Outlets including Variety and Billboard went on to report on tensions between Bieber and Braun.

== Readership and staff ==
As of November 2022, Puck had 25 staff members and 200,000 email subscribers. As of 2024, Puck has 40,000 paid subscribers, which the Wall Street Journal reported in February 2025 had "grown significantly since then". The New York Times reported in 2022 that the company had a valuation of approximately $70 million following its latest funding round. Puck journalists are given equity in the company and receive bonuses based on the number of subscribers their articles produce.
