= Assistant to the Secretary of Defense for Public Affairs =

Position in the United States government

- ATSD (PA)
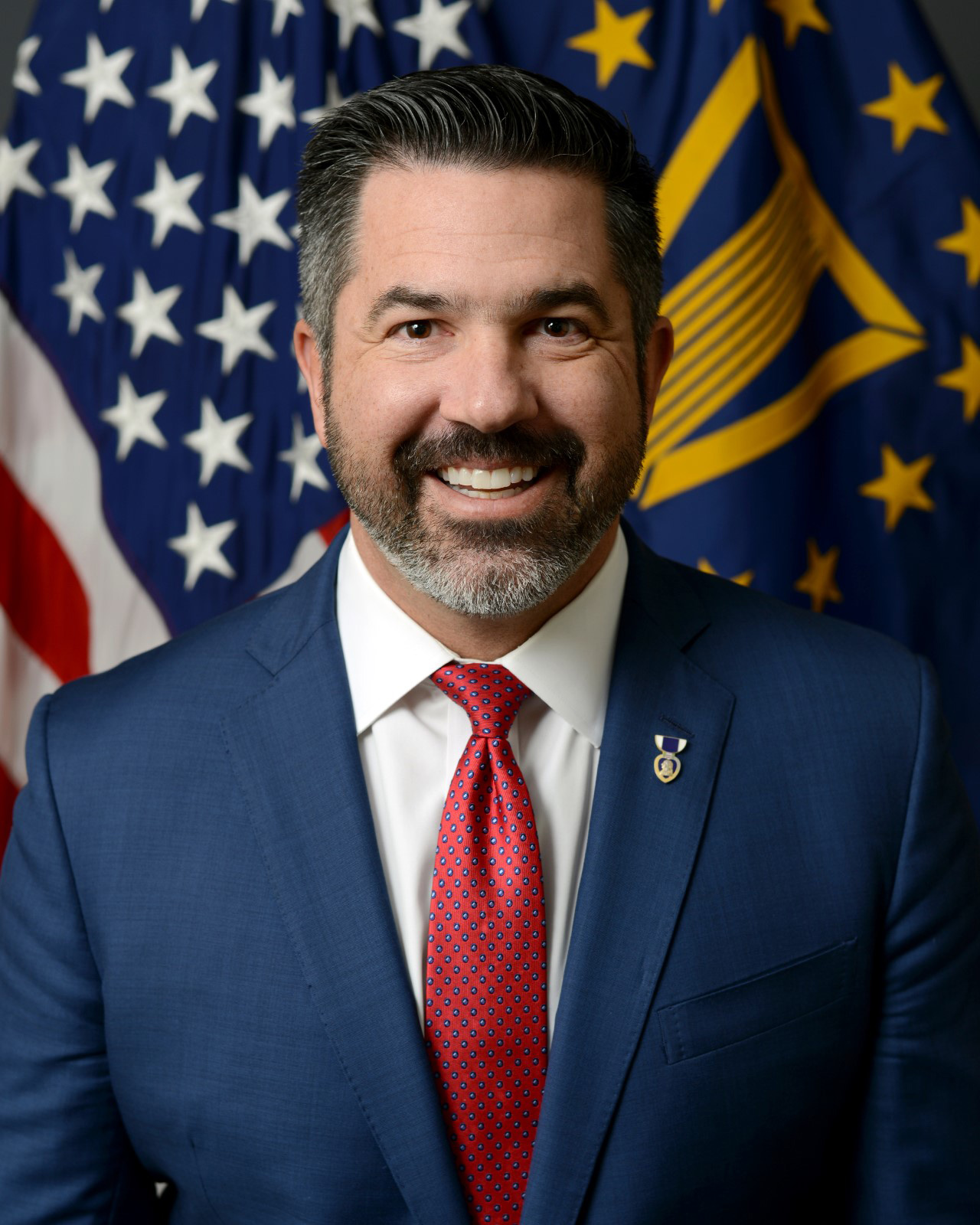
- Incumbent; Sean Parnell since February 3, 2025
- Department of Defense; Office of the Secretary of Defense
- Reports to: Secretary of Defense; Deputy Secretary of Defense
- Seat: The Pentagon, Arlington County, Virginia, U.S.
- Appointer: The secretary of defense
- Term length: No fixed term
- Constituting instrument: 10 U.S.C. § 138
- Formation: 1957
- First holder: Murray Snyder
- Salary: Executive Schedule, level IV
- Website: www.defense.gov

The assistant to the secretary of defense for public affairs, or ATSD (PA), is the principal staff advisor and assistant to the secretary of defense and deputy secretary of defense for public information, internal information, community relations, information training, and audiovisual matters in support of Department of Defense activities, leading a worldwide public affairs community of some 3,800 military and civilian personnel. The assistant to the secretary follows the secretary's Principles of Information in providing Defense Department information to the public, the United States Congress and the media.

Prior to October 2012, the position was known as the "assistant secretary of defense for public affairs", and was retitled in response to the Presidential Appointment Efficiency and Streamlining Act of 2011.

The ATSD(PA) is the principal but not the sole spokesperson for the department. In July 2011, the ASD(PA) announced the appointment of two additional spokespersons for the department. George E. Little, one of two deputy assistant secretaries of defense for public affairs, served concurrently as the Pentagon press secretary. Little stepped down Nov. 15, 2013. Navy Rear Admiral John Kirby served alongside Little as Deputy Assistant Secretary of Defense for Media Operations and Spokesman. Kirby stepped down as spokesman in February 2015. Both Little and Kirby served as spokespeople for the secretary of defense and for the department. In August 2022, after ATSD(PA) Kirby vacated the role, a separate Department of Defense press secretary position was split off and filled by Patrick S. Ryder, with the ATSD(PA) later announced as Chris Meagher in September.

== Roles and responsibilities ==
ASD PA manages the following critical functions: community and public outreach, press operations, speechwriting, news analysis, communications planning. The ASD PA:

- Serves as the principal spokesperson for the Department of Defense and is the sole release authority for official DoD information to news media representatives.
- Ensures free flow of information to the news media, service members and families, Congress, partners, and the general public at large.
- Develops and maintains relationships with the news media based on trust and integrity, on behalf of the Department leadership, to ensure honest forthright reporting about the department.
- Provides the critical link between DoD and the American people to ensure the efforts of service members are told in a timely and accurate manner and that information is only constrained by national security requirements.
- Responsible for ensuring media representatives are given maximum access to ongoing military operations, including in Iraq and Afghanistan, to provide fair and accurate reporting.
- Develops communications policies, plans, and programs in support of DoD objectives and operations.
- Integrates social and online media tools into the department's communication strategy to maximize our ability to communicate timely information to traditional and non-traditional audiences.

In addition, the ASD PA exercises authority, direction, and control over the Defense Media Activity (DMA). DMA provides news and information to our over one million service members stationed at home and around the world via broadcast, radio, web, and periodicals. DMA also trains DoD and other Federal Department public affairs professionals.

The ASD PA is supported by the following divisions:

=== Press operations ===
- Provides expert advice and counsel to the Secretary of Defense, the Deputy Secretary, the Under Secretaries and every key organization with the DoD to ensure timely and accurate information is provided to the media, Congress, and the public at large.
- In 2010, conducted more than 200 press briefings in the Pentagon Briefing Room per year including 13 briefings by the Secretary of Defense; supported 41 press briefings during Secretary of Defense travels.
- Coordinates and releases approximately 1,250 news releases/advisories a year.
- Arranges more than 1,200 media interviews and responded to thousands of queries, resulting in a countless number of press articles, broadcasts, and online media postings.
- Provides guidance to the communications shops for all the Services, CoComs and Under Secretaries of Defense on media issues to include formal exercise and contingency operations public affairs guidance.

=== Speechwriting ===
- Prepares more than 50 major speeches and congressional testimonies each year to communicate the Secretary's goals and priorities for the department in a way that has impact in the media, the general public and within the U.S. military.

=== Communications planning and integration (CPI) ===
- Interfaces with planners in OSD Policy, Joint Staff, Combatant Commands, military services, and the inter-agency to develop communication plans and strategies that accurately reflect U.S. policy goals, objectives and facts.
- Serves as the key communication planning integrator for the DoD and serves as its lead on communication planning interactions with other U.S. Government elements.

=== Community relations ===
- Maintains engagement with more than 200 national, regional and local nonprofit organizations that support our service members and military families and provides guidance and counsel to worldwide DoD offices overseeing 2,300 Family Readiness volunteers and coordinators.
- Receives and responds to over 50,000 public queries annually via web, phone, hard copy letters; responds to 2,900 annual public requests for commercial use of DoD imagery.
- Responds to approximately 800 queries per year from non-profit/VSO leadership, congressional offices.
- Conducts the Pentagon tour program for 136,000 visitors per year.
- Conducts the Joint Civilian Orientation Conference (JCOC), a twice annual five-day program that connects prominent business and community leaders with senior military officials and troops on the ground.

=== Defense Media Activity ===
- Communicates messages from senior DoD leaders to support and improve quality of life and morale, promote situational awareness, provide timely and immediate force protection information, and sustain readiness. Defense Media Activity (DMA) consists of 2,400 employees and has an annual budget of more than $200 million to provide the following services:
- American Forces Network, also known as American Forces Network (AFN), broadcasts multiple television and radio channels providing a "touch of home" for nearly one million members of the military and their families deployed or stationed in 177 countries, to include Afghanistan and Iraq and Navy ships at sea.
- Stars and Stripes is a news and information organization that serves military audiences world-wide. Annual distribution of the newspaper is 33 million copies. Stripes is a journalistic and editorially independent publication provided free to deployed troops.
- Defense Visual Imagery Management Operations Center (DIMOC) collects, distributes and archives on a real-time basis combat camera still and motion imagery depicting U.S. military activities and operations worldwide.
- Defense Information School (DINFOS) provides initial and advanced public affairs and visual information training for military and civilian students of all services and international partners. DINFOS has an annual student load of more than 3200 students and 30 courses of study.
- Public Web supports and manages the hosting for nearly 600 OSD, JCS, combatant command, and military service public-facing web sites.

== History ==
The position was originally established as the Assistant to the Secretary (Director, Office of Public Information) by Secretary James V. Forrestal in July 1948. The Office of Public Information was created at the recommendation of William R. Mathews, Editor of the Arizona Daily Star, who served as a special consultant on Secretary Forrestal's staff from March to July 1948.. Secretary Forrestal offered Mathews the position of Director to lead the office, but he declined the job and Harold Hinton became the inaugural holder of the position. After Reorganization Plan No.6 of 30 June 1953 increased the number of assistant secretaries, Defense Directive 5122.1 of September 1953 redesignated the post as Assistant Secretary of Defense (Legislative and Public Affairs)

This position was abolished in February 1957, and functions were divided between two new posts, the Assistant Secretary of Defense (Public Affairs) and an Assistant Secretary of Defense (Legislative Affairs). ASD(PA) was established by Defense Directive 5105.13 of 10 August 1957.

In 1993, the position was changed to Assistant to the Secretary of Defense for Public Affairs, by Defense Directive 5122.5. This bureaucratic distinction was dropped after the National Defense Authorization Act for FY1995 (P.L. 103–337) increased the number of assistant secretaries from 10 to 11. The post was subsequently titled Assistant Secretary of Defense (Public Affairs), referred to as the Assistant Secretary of Defense for Public Affairs, and abbreviated as ASD(PA). In October 2015 the position was retitled again, reverting to Assistant to the Secretary of Defense for Public Affairs, in response to the Presidential Appointment Efficiency and Streamlining Act of 2011.

=== Pentagon rapid response operation ===
From 2006 to 2007 the Pentagon rapid response operation was a public relations initiative by the United States Department of Defense to "quickly respond to news media stories critical of ... the Iraq War, as well as other stories the Defense Department leadership doesn't like." An October 3, 2006 memo written by Dorrance Smith, the ATSD (PA), obtained later by the Associated Press, described the team's role. The memo envisioned that the team would "'develop messages' for the 24-hour news cycle and 'correct the record'" in a way similar to political campaign operations, such as Bill Clinton's successful 1992 presidential campaign. Smith also set forth four branches of the operation: "New Media" (for Web sites, podcasts, and YouTube); "Rapid Response" (for letters to the editor); "TV and Radio Booking" (for booking civilian and military guests on cable news and radio); and "Surrogates" (for "analysts who speak publicly, often on behalf of the Pentagon"). During the brief life of the "'rapid response cell," a "team of public affairs officers working behind closed doors ... churn[ed] out e-mail messages, press releases, opinion pieces and corrections to perceived inaccuracies or biased reporting worldwide."

The Pentagon rapid-response unit was a priority of U.S. Secretary of Defense Donald Rumsfeld, and some congressional Democrats criticized the initiative as excessively focused on Rumsfeld's personal reputation, rather than the reputation of the U.S. armed forces. Soon after being sworn in as secretary of defense in 2007, Rumsfeld's successor Robert Gates disbanded the unit.

== Officeholders ==
The table below includes both the various titles of this post over time, as well as all the holders of those offices.

Assistant secretaries of defense (public affairs)
Name	Tenure	SecDef(s) served under	President(s) served under
Assistant to the Secretary (Director, Office of Public Information)
Harold B. Hinton	July 19, 1948 – March 12, 1949	James V. Forrestal	Harry Truman
William Frye	March 12, 1949 – February 19, 1950	James V. Forrestal	Harry Truman
William Frye	March 12, 1949 – February 19, 1950	Louis A. Johnson	Harry Truman
Osgood Roberts (Acting)	February 20, 1950 – January 24, 1951	Louis A. Johnson	Harry Truman
Osgood Roberts (Acting)	February 20, 1950 – January 24, 1951	George C. Marshall	Harry Truman
Clayton Fritchey	January 25, 1951 – June 1, 1952	George C. Marshall	Harry Truman
Clayton Fritchey	January 25, 1951 – June 1, 1952	Robert A. Lovett	Harry Truman
Andrew H. Berding	July 1, 1952 – November 18, 1953	Robert A. Lovett	Harry Truman
Andrew H. Berding	July 1, 1952 – November 18, 1953	Charles E. Wilson	Dwight Eisenhower
Assistant Secretary of Defense (Legislative and Public Affairs)
Frederick A. Seaton	September 15, 1953 – February 20, 1955	Charles E. Wilson	Dwight Eisenhower
Robert Tripp Ross	March 15, 1955 – February 20, 1957	Charles E. Wilson	Dwight Eisenhower
Assistant Secretary of Defense (Public Affairs)
Murray Snyder	March 21, 1957 – January 20, 1961	Charles E. Wilson	Dwight Eisenhower
Murray Snyder	March 21, 1957 – January 20, 1961	Neil H. McElroy	Dwight Eisenhower
Murray Snyder	March 21, 1957 – January 20, 1961	Thomas S. Gates	Dwight Eisenhower
Arthur Sylvester	January 20, 1961 – February 3, 1967	Robert S. McNamara	John F. Kennedy
Arthur Sylvester	January 20, 1961 – February 3, 1967	Robert S. McNamara	Lyndon Johnson
Philip G. Goulding	February 28, 1967 – January 20, 1969	Robert S. McNamara	Lyndon Johnson
Philip G. Goulding	February 28, 1967 – January 20, 1969	Clark M. Clifford	Lyndon Johnson
Daniel Z. Henkin	January 20, 1969 – May 25, 1969 (Acting); May 25, 1969 – January 20, 1973	Melvin R. Laird	Richard Nixon
Jerry W. Friedheim	January 20, 1973 – April 13, 1973 (Acting); April 13, 1973 – September 20, 1974	Melvin R. Laird	Richard Nixon
Jerry W. Friedheim	January 20, 1973 – April 13, 1973 (Acting); April 13, 1973 – September 20, 1974	Elliot L. Richardson	Gerald Ford
Jerry W. Friedheim	January 20, 1973 – April 13, 1973 (Acting); April 13, 1973 – September 20, 1974	James R. Schlesinger	Gerald Ford
William Beecher (Acting)	September 21, 1974 – February 11, 1975	James R. Schlesinger	Gerald Ford
Joseph Laitin	February 12, 1975 – December 19, 1975	James R. Schlesinger	Gerald Ford
Joseph Laitin	February 12, 1975 – December 19, 1975	Donald H. Rumsfeld	Gerald Ford
William I. Greener, Jr.	December 21, 1975 – July 31, 1976	Donald H. Rumsfeld	Gerald Ford
M. Alan Woods	August 6, 1976 – January 21, 1977	Donald H. Rumsfeld	Gerald Ford
Thomas B. Ross	March 7, 1977 – January 20, 1981	Harold Brown	Jimmy Carter
Henry E. Catto, Jr.	May 22, 1981 – September 16, 1983	Caspar W. Weinberger	Ronald Reagan
Benjamin Welles (Acting)	September 17, 1983 – November 1, 1983	Caspar W. Weinberger	Ronald Reagan
Mary Lou Sheils (Acting)	November 2, 1983 – November 22, 1983	Caspar W. Weinberger	Ronald Reagan
Michael I. Burch	November 23, 1983 – June 22, 1985	Caspar W. Weinberger	Ronald Reagan
Fred Hoffman (Acting)	June 23, 1985 – October 1, 1985	Caspar W. Weinberger	Ronald Reagan
Robert B. Sims	October 18, 1985 – September 20, 1987	Caspar W. Weinberger	Ronald Reagan
Fred Hoffman (Acting)	September 21, 1987 – February 2, 1988	Caspar W. Weinberger	Ronald Reagan
Fred Hoffman (Acting)	September 21, 1987 – February 2, 1988	Frank C. Carlucci III	Ronald Reagan
J. Daniel Howard	February 3, 1988 – March 21, 1989	Frank C. Carlucci III	Ronald Reagan
J. Daniel Howard	February 3, 1988 – March 21, 1989	William H. Taft IV (Acting)	George H. W. Bush
Louis A. "Pete" Williams	May 22, 1989 – January 20, 1993	Richard B. Cheney	George H. W. Bush
Assistant to the Secretary of Defense (Public Affairs)
Vernon A. Guidry, Jr.	January 22, 1993 – July 18, 1993	Leslie Aspin, Jr.	Bill Clinton
Kathleen deLaski	July 19, 1993 – August 5, 1994	Leslie Aspin, Jr.	Bill Clinton
Kathleen deLaski	July 19, 1993 – August 5, 1994	William J. Perry	Bill Clinton
Kenneth H. Bacon	September 20, 1994 – March 29, 1996	William J. Perry	Bill Clinton
Assistant Secretary of Defense (Public Affairs)
Kenneth H. Bacon	March 29, 1996 – January 19, 2001	William J. Perry	Bill Clinton
Kenneth H. Bacon	March 29, 1996 – January 19, 2001	William S. Cohen	Bill Clinton
Victoria Clarke	May 22, 2001 – June 20, 2003	Donald H. Rumsfeld	George W. Bush
Lawrence Di Rita (Acting)	August 10, 2003 – September 22, 2005	Donald H. Rumsfeld	George W. Bush
J. Dorrance Smith	January 5, 2006 – January 20, 2009	Donald H. Rumsfeld	George W. Bush
J. Dorrance Smith	January 5, 2006 – January 20, 2009	Robert M. Gates	George W. Bush
Robert T. Hastings, Jr. (Acting)	March 10, 2008 – March 31, 2009	Robert M. Gates	George W. Bush
Douglas B. Wilson	February 11, 2010 – March 31, 2012	Robert M. Gates	Barack Obama
Price Floyd (Performing the Duties of)	Dates not established	Leon Panetta	Barack Obama
Douglas B. Wilson	February 11, 2010 – March 31, 2012	Leon Panetta	Barack Obama
George Little (Acting)	April 1, 2012 – October 8, 2012	Leon Panetta	Barack Obama
Assistant to the Secretary of Defense (Public Affairs)
George Little	October 9, 2012 – November 15, 2013	Leon Panetta	Barack Obama
George Little	October 9, 2012 – November 15, 2013	Chuck Hagel	Barack Obama
Brent Colburn	December 18, 2014 – July 2015	Chuck Hagel	Barack Obama
Brent Colburn	December 18, 2014 – July 2015	Ashton Carter	Barack Obama
Maura Sullivan	July 2015 – November 2015	Ashton Carter	Barack Obama
Peter Cook	November 2015 – January 20, 2017	Ashton Carter	Barack Obama
Dana W. White	January 20, 2017 – December 31, 2018	James Mattis	Donald Trump
Charles Summers (Acting)	January 1, 2019 – May 19, 2019	Pat Shanahan (Acting)	Donald Trump
Jonathan Rath Hoffman	May 20, 2019 – January 20, 2021	Pat Shanahan (Acting)	Donald Trump
Jonathan Rath Hoffman	May 20, 2019 – January 20, 2021	Richard V. Spencer (Acting)	Donald Trump
Jonathan Rath Hoffman	May 20, 2019 – January 20, 2021	Mark Esper	Donald Trump
John Kirby	January 20, 2021 – May 27, 2022	Lloyd Austin	Joe Biden
Gordon Trowbridge (Acting)	May 27, 2022 – September 9, 2022	Lloyd Austin	Joe Biden
Chris Meagher	September 9, 2022 – January 20, 2025	Lloyd Austin	Joe Biden
Jonathan L. Ullyot (acting)	January 20, 2025 - February 3, 2025	Pete Hegseth	Donald Trump
Sean Parnell	February 3, 2025 - Incumbent	Pete Hegseth	Donald Trump

== Budget ==
=== Budget totals ===
The annual budget for ASD(PA) is contained in the OSD's budget, under the Defense-Wide Operation and Maintenance (O&M) account.

ASD(PA) Budget, FY 10-12 ($ in thousands)
Line item	FY11 estimate	FY12 estimate
Assistant Secretary of Defense, Public Affairs	7,253	7,079
