= William Urban (military officer) =

American military officer

William Urban is an American military officer serving as military deputy to the publisher of American military newspaper Stars and Stripes since 2026.

== Career ==
Urban is an active-duty Navy captain. Urban previously served as a senior spokesman for the Department of Defense across various roles.

=== Stars and Stripes ===
In August 2026, Urban was appointed as a deputy to Stars and Stripes publisher Max Lederer.

On August 20, 2026, three Democratic senators wrote to Secretary of Defense Pete Hegseth asking why Urban had been installed.

On August 21, 2026, Lederer, along with Stars and Stripes' editor, Erik Slavin, and Middle East correspondent Lara Korte had been terminated for insubordination. In a letter posted on Stars and Stripes later that day, Urban wrote "I understand that I am now part of a team, committed to editorially independent journalism that best serves our most important customer, which is our service members, their families, and our greater military community."

The Department of Defense declined to comment on Urban's appointment.

Urban subsequently told Stars and Stripes staff that he would eventually assume the role as the publisher.
