= Harlan N. Hartness =

U.S. Army major general

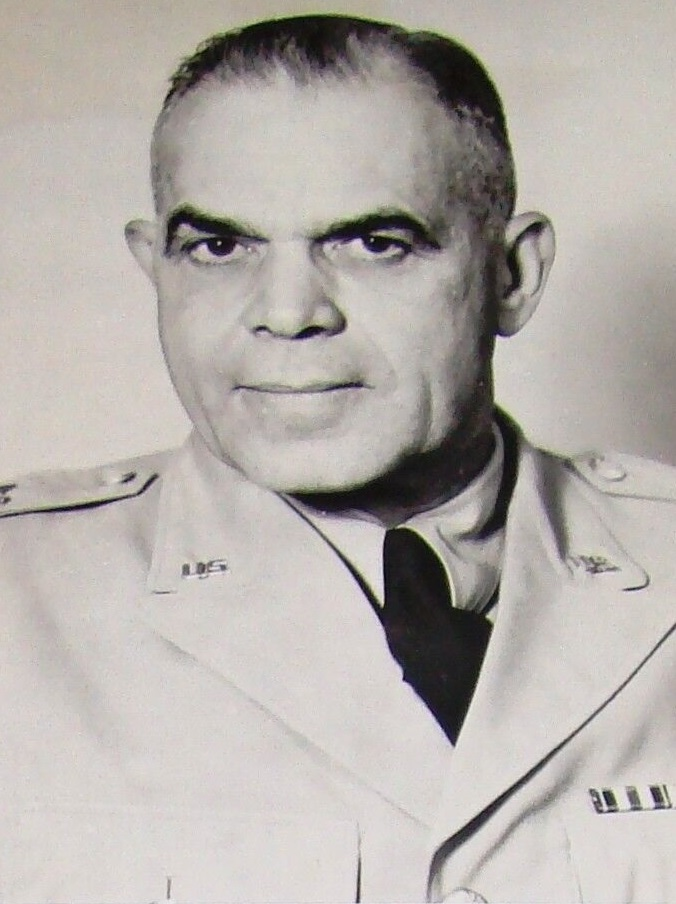
- Hartness as commander of the 4th Infantry Division, 1951
- Born: March 28, 1898; Claremont, Virginia, U.S.
- Died: June 16, 1986 (aged 88); Tappahannock, Virginia, U.S.
- Burial place: Saint Stephen's Episcopal Church Cemetery, Heathsville, Virginia, U.S.
- Education: United States Military Academy; Columbia College; United States Army Command and General Staff College
- Spouse: Mamie Humber (Mooty) Hartness (m. 1921–1984)
- Children: 1
- Military career
- Service: United States Army
- Service years: 1918–1954
- Rank: Major General
- Service number: O12269
- Unit: U.S. Army Infantry Branch
- Commands: 26th Infantry Division (acting); 7th Infantry Division; Army Ground Forces Board Number 3 United States Army Command and General Staff College (acting); 4th Infantry Division; Office of Armed Forces Information and Education
- Wars: World War I Occupation of the Rhineland; World War II; United States Army Military Government in Korea
- Awards: Silver Star; Legion of Merit; Bronze Star Medal with Oak leaf cluster
- Other work: Treasurer, Freedoms Foundation at Valley Forge

Harlan N. Hartness (March 28, 1898 – June 13, 1986) was a career officer in the United States Army. Appointed to the United States Military Academy (West Point) in 1917, his class graduated from an accelerated academic program in 1918 with the anticipation of entering the First World War. After the Armistice of November 11, 1918 ended the war, Hartness class returned to West Point, then graduated again in June 1921. His subsequent education included a bachelor's degree from New York City's Columbia College and completion of the United States Army Command and General Staff College.

A veteran of World War I, World War II, and the United States Army Military Government in Korea, Hartness attained the rank of major general and served in high-profile command assignments including the 7th Infantry Division, Army Ground Forces Board Number 3, United States Army Command and General Staff College, 4th Infantry Division, and the Office of Armed Forces Information and Education. He served from 1918 to 1954, and his awards included the Silver Star, Legion of Merit, two awards of the Bronze Star Medal and the Order of the Patriotic War First Class (Union of Soviet Socialist Republics). In retirement, Hartness' activities included serving as treasurer of the Freedoms Foundation at Valley Forge.

== Early life ==
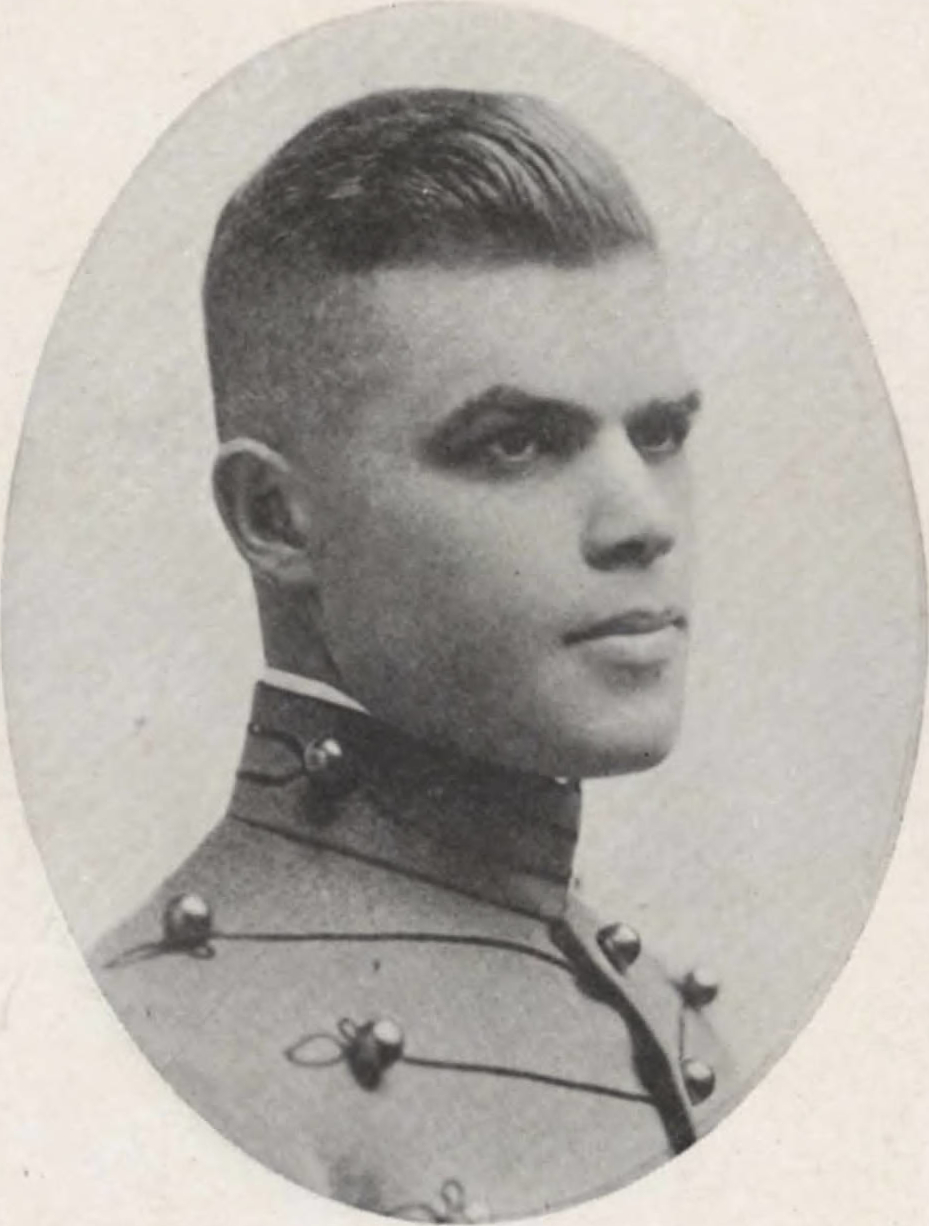
Hartness as a United States Military Academy cadet c. 1918

Harlan Nelson Hartness was born in the Claremont, Virginia on March 28, 1898, the son of Reverend Robert Nelson Hartness and Sarah (Mitchell) Hartness. He was raised and educated in Newport News, Richmond, and Norfolk. Hartness graduated from Norfolk's Matthew Fontaine Maury High School in 1916, then began attendance at the University of Virginia.

In 1917, Hartness was appointed to the United States Military Academy (West Point). To meet the need for officers during World War I, his class completed an accelerated academic program in November 1918. Hartness was commissioned a second lieutenant of Infantry, then departed for France. The Armistice of November 11, 1918 ended the war before he arrived, but Hartness participated in a 1919 observation tour of World War I battlefields in Belgium, France, and Italy, as well as observing the Occupation of the Rhineland.

== Start of career ==
After returning to the United States in September 1919, Hartness began attendance at the Infantry Officer Basic Course, from which he graduated in 1920. In December 1920, he received promotion to first lieutenant. Hartness' West Point class returned to the academy in 1920, and he graduated again in 1921. Hartness was discharged as a first lieutenant in December 1921, and recommissioned as a second lieutenant. Hartness attended Columbia College in New York City in anticipation of serving on the West Point faculty, and he received a Bachelor of Arts degree in English in 1923. He was promoted to first lieutenant again in June 1923.

Hartness served as an English instructor at West Point from 1923 to 1926. From 1926 to 1929, he was assigned to the 33rd Infantry Regiment in the Panama Canal Zone. After returning to the United States, he served as assistant professor of military science for the Army Reserve Officers' Training Corps program at the University of Minnesota. From 1933 to 1935, Hartness was a student at the United States Army Command and General Staff College, and he was promoted to captain in June 1935.

== Continued career ==
From 1935 to 1937, Hartness attended the Prussian Staff College in Berlin, the senior service college for the German General Staff. After his return to the United States, he prepared a report on his experience, including the opinions of German students about topics including the rise of the Nazi Party and the plans of Adolf Hitler. According to Hartness, in the view of most German army officers, Hitler's chancellorship would likely be short-lived because he did not enjoy the respect of educated and socially well-connected Germans. In Hartness' view, officers in the German army were naive with respect to Hitler's plans and disconnected from public opinion.

From 1937 to 1940, Hartness served at the Command and General Staff College as an instructor in European tactics and strategy, and he was promoted to major in July 1940. From 1940 to 1942, he served at the War Department as a planner of exercises and training. With the army expanding in anticipation of entry into World War II, he was promoted to temporary lieutenant colonel in September 1941 and temporary colonel in June 1942.

== Later career ==
In August 1942, Hartness was promoted to temporary brigadier general and assigned as assistant division commander of the 94th Infantry Division during its organization and training at Fort Custer, Michigan. Hartness remained with the 94th Division until September 1944, when he was appointed assistant division commander of the 26th Infantry Division. Hartness served with the 26th Division until the end of the war, including combat in the Northern France, Rhineland, Ardennes Alsace, and Central Europe campaigns.

At the end of the Second World War, Hartness remained with the 26th Division during its post-war occupation of Czechoslovakia, and he acted as division commander from June to July 1945. He was then assigned to the Infantry center at Fort Benning, Georgia, where he served as president of Army Ground Forces Board Number 3, one of several panels that considered issues and made recommendations with respect to post-war organization, training, and equipping of the army. When the National War College was founded in 1946, Hartness was among the senior officers whose wartime experience resulted in them being awarded equivalent credit for completing its program of instruction. Hartness was posted to South Korea as assistant division commander of the 7th Infantry Division during the United States Army Military Government in Korea. He was subsequently assigned as division commander, and he led the division from October 1947 to May 1948.

After his service in Korea, Hartness was posted to the Command and General Staff College as deputy commandant, and he acted as commandant from July to October 1950. In October 1950, Hartness was assigned to command the 4th Infantry Division, and he was promoted to major general in February 1951. In April 1951, Hartness led the 4th Infantry Division as it moved to West Germany in order to take up its role as part of North Atlantic Treaty Organization (NATO) forces in Western Europe, the first large deployment of U.S. troops to the European continent since the end of World War II.

In April 1952, Hartness was assigned as commander of the newly formed Office of Armed Forces Information and Education. He remained in this position until October 1954, when he retired. The awards and decorations Hartness earned during his career included the Silver Star, Legion of Merit, two awards of the Bronze Star Medal and the Order of the Patriotic War First Class (Union of Soviet Socialist Republics).

== Retirement and death ==
In retirement, Hartness was a resident of Ophelia, Virginia. Among his endeavors was service as national treasurer of Freedoms Foundation at Valley Forge. He died in Tappahannock on June 13, 1986. Hartness was buried at Saint Stephen's Episcopal Church Cemetery in Heathsville, Virginia.

== Family ==
In June 1921, Hartness married Mamie Humber Mooty of Columbus, Georgia. They were married until her death in 1984, and were the parents of a daughter, Sarah Elizabeth. Sarah Elizabeth Hartness was the wife of Allan Rawson Williams, an army veteran of World War II and a research chemist for Uniroyal.
