= DoD News Channel =

Former American television channel

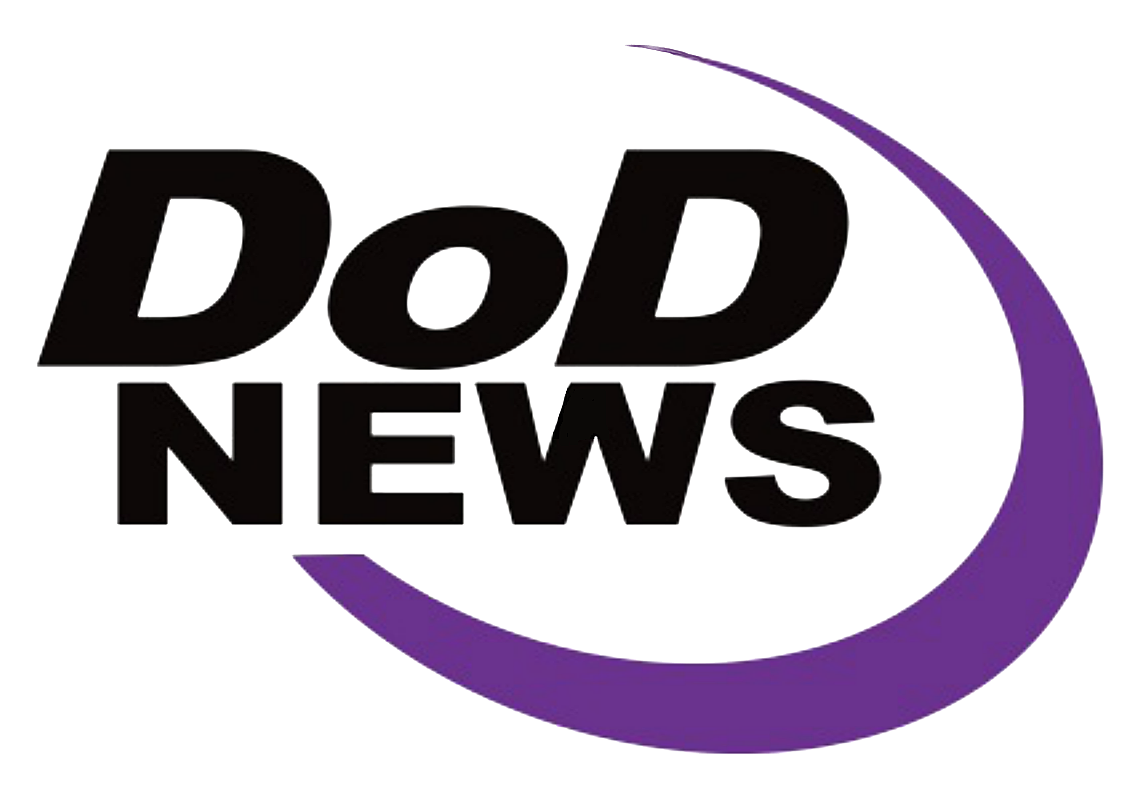
- Headquarters: Fort George G. Meade, Maryland

Ownership
- Owner: Defense Media Activity

History
- Launched: May 14, 2004; 22 years ago
- Closed: April 17, 2015; 11 years ago
- Former names: The Pentagon Channel (2004–14)

DoD News Channel was a television channel broadcasting military news and information for the 2.6 million members of the U.S. Armed Forces. It was widely available in the United States as a standalone television channel, or as part of programming on local PEG cable television channels. It could be viewed FTA in most Central and Western European countries (from Eurobird 9A at 9.0° East), Africa, the Americas and most of Asia via satellite, and globally via the Internet. DoD News Channel was free, in the public domain, and accessible 24/7 to all U.S. cable and satellite providers.

The channel was founded in 2004 as The Pentagon Channel. On July 8, 2014, The Pentagon Channel was rebranded as the DoD News Channel. The channel ceased operations on April 17, 2015. However, content will still be produced for the American Forces Network and the website Defense.gov.

== Programming ==
The network’s programming included Department of Defense news briefings, Military news, Interviews with top Defense officials, Short stories about the work of the United States military, and Military Lifestyle programming.

As The Pentagon Channel, the channel carried:

- RECON: A monthly half-hour informational television program providing an in-depth look on a variety of topics from real world operations, missions, military events / history and other subjects highlighting the accomplishments of U.S. military men and women.
- Around the Services: Daily half-hour program featuring military news from top DoD officials, as well as military services throughout the world.
- Fit for Duty: Takes viewers through a high-energy 30-minute workout led by service members with expertise in fitness training. The show makes it simple to follow along and complete exercises demonstrated by the instructors. A military sports-medicine physician also offers tips for preventing injuries and avoiding career-ending accidents during each episode of the show.
- Downrange: The latest news from Iraq and Afghanistan affecting U.S. military members.
- Battleground: Every weekend, this series features historic films from World War II, Korean War, and the Vietnam War.
- The Grill Sergeants: The Grill Sergeants teach audience members how to prepare food. The in-house Army jazz quartet, the Tastebuds, play the show's score.
- This Week in the Pentagon: A weekly half hour update on the news coming out of the Pentagon, taking one topic each week and exploring it in-depth.
- FNG (For New Guys): FNG is a half-hour lifestyle show featuring useful advice aimed at young troops new to the military. Viewers will learn about great low-cost travel, cooking, assignments, electronics and more.
- Command Performance: Features military journalists talking with today's top entertainers for conversations with a uniquely military perspective. An updated revival of a 1940s radio program of the same name.

The Pentagon Channel also showed programming direct from the services such as, Freedom Journal Iraq, Freedom Watch Afghanistan, Army Newswatch, AFN Korea Nightly News, AFN Europe Report, Pacific Report, Eye on Nellis, The American Veteran, Air Force Space Today, In Step with Fort Riley and On Track with Ft. Hood, as well as live Department of Defense briefings and roundtables.

With the change to DoD News Channel, most of the non-news programming was either dropped or de-emphasized.

== Podcasting ==
In April 2006, the Pentagon Channel launched its podcasting initiative, having offered up to 27 podcasts via the iTunes Store and its website.

== American Forces Press Service ==
The American Forces Press Service (AFPS) was the news service provided by the Defense Media Activity (formerly the American Forces Information Service), part of the United States Department of Defense. It supplied news stories pertaining to the activities of the U.S. military around the world. The New York Times has described it as the Pentagon's "media branch" or "internal news service".

AFPS was shuttered in a 2015 internal realignment of the Defense Media Activity and its reporting was merged with that of other DMA DOD-level production activities into a new organization named DOD News. DOD News was in turn shuttered during a 2018 internal realignment. DOD-level reporting of the type formerly done by AFPS and DOD News reporters is now credited to Defense.gov.

AFPS, DOD News and Defense.gov reporting uses a modified version of Associated Press style.

== See also ==
- American Forces Network
