= Strategic communication =

Style of organizational communication

Strategic communication is the purposeful use of communication by an organization to reach a specific goal. Organizations like governments, corporations, NGOs and militaries seeking to communicate a concept, process, or data to satisfy their organizational or strategic goals will use strategic communication. The modern process features advanced planning, international telecommunications, and dedicated global network assets. Targeted organizational goals can include commercial, non-commercial, military business, combat, political warfare and logistic goals. Strategic communication can either be internal or external to the organization. The interdisciplinary study of strategic communications includes organizational communication, management, military history, mass communication, PR, advertising and marketing.

== Definitions ==
Strategic communication refers to policy-making and guidance for consistent information activity within an organization and between organizations. Equivalent business management terms include integrated (marketing) communication, organizational communication, corporate communication, institutional communication, etc. (see paragraph on 'Business and Commercial Application' below). It involves a strategic approach to planning, developing, and eventually executing communication campaigns in order to achieve specific goals and objectives. It also includes analyzing communication needs and overall effectiveness.

Strategic communication management could be defined as the systematic planning and realization of flow of information, communication, media development, and image care on a long-term horizon. It conveys deliberate messages through the most suitable media to the designated audiences at the appropriate time to contribute to and achieve the desired long-term effect. Communication management is process creation. It has to bring three factors into balance: the message, the media channel, and the audience.

=== Academia ===
In academic contexts, strategic communication has been analyzed through various conceptual frameworks, including the "5 Ps" model—plan, pattern, position, perspective, and ploy—adapted from Henry Mintzberg’s work on strategy and further developed in communication research. This perspective is further elaborated in Strategizing Communication: Theory and Practice, where Ib Tunby Gulbrandsen and Sine Just explore how communicative action and reflexive strategy-making are intertwined within the logic of the 5 Ps framework.

=== Business and commercial application ===
In business and commercial settings, strategic communication is communication aligned with the company's overall strategy to enhance its strategic positioning. Strategic communication, sometimes known as public relations, is a conscious, planned, and ongoing effort made by organizations. The goal is to create a receptive environment for improving cooperation, reducing conflict, and marketing products or services.

Stakeholder oriented strategic communication approach

It is undisputable that strategic communication is the cornerstone for the achievement of organizational goals. It is also a fact and a well-documented stance that the problems bedeviling most African organizations emanate from heavy reliance on non-African strategic communication theories in order to solve organizational communication problems. Even though the role and impact of theories emanating from Africa is viewed as important, there is a dearth of such tools. Western informed dominant theories are not best suited to solve Sub-Saharan communication problems. In the mode of reconceptualising strategic communications, this chapter introduces a home-grown approach, the stakeholder-oriented strategic communicative control approach (SOSCCA). The approach emanates from the perspective that stakeholders strive to be in control of organisational activities. The aim of the approach is to predict elements impeding effective stakeholder communication with managers and the entire workforce. It also aims to show the importance of stakeholder control communication in ensuring the survival of organisations in stiffer competitive and crisis induced environments. The SOSCCA intends to make managers, researchers and stockholders realise the need to shift focus on managerialism. Qualitatively collected and analysed data from organisations in Sub-Saharan Africa informs this theory. Participants and organisations were conveniently sampled.

=== Government and Defense application ===
The U.S. government outlines its use of strategic communication as "government efforts to understand and engage key audiences to create, strengthen, or preserve conditions favorable for the advancement of United States Government interests, policies, and objectives through the use of coordinated programs, plans, themes, messages, and products synchronized with the actions of all instruments of national power." Further, in the US DoD's Principles of Strategic Communication," Robert T. Hastings Jr. (2008), acting Assistant Secretary of Defense for Public Affairs, described strategic communication as "the synchronization of images, actions and words to achieve a desired effect."

NATO Policy defines its strategic communication as "the coordinated and appropriate use of NATO communications activities and capabilities – Public Diplomacy, Military Public Affairs, Information Operations, and Psychological Operations, as appropriate – in support of Alliance policies, operations and activities, and in order to advance NATO's aims". Strategic Communication is a process that supports and strengthens efforts to achieve objectives. It guides and informs decisions rather than the organization. Considerations of Strategic Communication should be integrated from the early planning stages and be followed by communication activities.

Steve Tatham of the UK Defence Academy offers an alternative view of strategic communication. He argues that while strategic communication is desirable to bind and coordinate communications together, particularly from governments or the military, it should be viewed as something more fundamental than just a process. The "informational effect" should be placed at the center of command and action should be calibrated against that effect, which includes the evaluation of second and third order effects. Tatham argues that "strategic communication" (singular) refers to the abstract concept, while "strategic communications" (plural) refers to the actual process of communicating, which includes target audience analysis, evaluation of conduits, measurements of effect, etc.

== Objectives ==
Strategic communication provides a conceptual umbrella that enables organizations to integrate their disparate messaging efforts. It allows them to create and share communications that, while varying in style and purpose, maintain an inner coherence. This can reinforce the organizational message and brand. Strategic communicators aim to prevent contradictory and confusing messaging to different groups across all media platforms.

Communication is strategic when it is consistent with the organization's mission, vision, values, and when it is able to enhance the strategic positioning and competitiveness between their competitors. As a result of this communication, strategic communication follows ‘the nature of organizational communication in general, and strategic communication in particular, is defined as the purposeful use of communication by an organization to fulfill its mission.'

The Strategic Communications Framework uses an objective that aims to communicate with the audience/organization. The application of the specific content will help achieve the business goal clearly. While communication is something that happens in the organization, businesses that implement strategies impacting the effectiveness of their business communications can achieve measurable results. Technological advancements have been a factor in such business because information can be communicated through various channels and media. The growth of technology has accelerated communication and allows customers to connect and communicate with others. This can make it easier for them to reach each other through a type of communication that suits their needs. Mulhern (2009) states, ‘These changes mean that marketers are in a far more challenging competitive environment in attempting to fulfil customers wants and needs, while simultaneously seeking to develop long-term relationships.' Changes in communication will help communication goals, organization, and communication channels. This will measure the effectiveness of the communication tactics used in a business for their audience.

=== Strategic planning ===
To have an object, the first thing to do is have a plan for the business to communicate how the business is formed and to see how strong its core is. Ensure that alignment with the organization's understanding of where it is currently at. An approach that could be used to determine the current state of the objective, is to do a SWOT (Strengths, Weaknesses, Opportunities, and Threats) analysis. When using a SWOT analysis, the strengths and weaknesses must be realistic. This is to help make improvements or adjustments that were not effective. The analysis will help get a better understanding of the business and will help plan and make the objectives more solid because it shows the strengths, weaknesses, opportunities, and threats the business is facing. This helps determine where the business is and where it will be in the future. Planning is a continuous process that involves research, analysis, execution, and assessment. Success in this process requires diligent and continual analysis, which should be fed back into the planning and action stages.

=== Communicate with key stakeholders ===
Communicate with stakeholders, audiences, and the public. conduct interviews with customers to learn their priorities and what goals they want to achieve with the organization. Having a good understanding of the business issues will allow the organization to offer effective solutions that will help the objective. Ask questions to see what the customer's aim is, with the main goal of focusing on what needs to be achieved and done and not what he/ or she wants. Tailoring messages to specific stakeholder groups can increase their effectiveness since it perfectly demonstrates an understanding of their priorities and concerns. ‘Sustainability calls for a value chain approach, whereby firms need to take wider responsibility and collaborate with a range of stakeholders to ensure that unsustainable practices are addressed’.

=== Develop actionable objectives ===
Objectives should have a specific end points to provide an indicator of success. Understanding the consumer and the marketplace, he or she can design a marketing strategy. Having an understanding of what is happening around the organization will ensure that planning the marketing strategy will be easy because the vision ensures the objectives are SMART. Objectives are the intended goals of a business campaigns, to show what is achievable. The objectives are effective when using SMART goals: they need to be specific, measurable, achievable, realistic, and time-sensitive. Have assignments for individuals or groups so the responsibilities for each of these objectives are already set and no adjustments are needed because they have been assigned to a specific person or group. The responsibility is in their hands. This is to indicate the specific individual or group has an assigned direct preliminary objective. They will need to develop a range of possible strategies and tactics to achieve the objectives given to them.

=== Develop and prioritize potential strategies and tactics ===
Brainstorm a list of potential strategies achievable for each of the objectives given out by the business and its customers, and have tactics that will support these strategies and objectives. Gather as a team to discuss the merits of each proposed strategy for the organization. The discussion must be about the strategies that will most likely be able to be used and those that are unlikely to be used. Some strategies will not be achievable, will be difficult, or no solution will be available for them so these will be crossed off the list. This shortens the list and helps to round up the best strategies left to be used. Collectively decide which strategies and tactics are going to be pursued to provide a clear objective for the business. The main focus is to achieve the objectives that were given out by the organization.

=== Metrics, timelines, and responsibilities ===
Include detail behind those strategies and tactics named out so that there is a clear objective and what is needed to be focused on. Explain how it will be successful, how it is measured, the time frame and who will be responsible. Planning is essential to ensure things are successfully planned out and strategies and tactics are successful. Planning does more than help a business achieve its objectives; it also improves communication within the group. Everyone should be assigned a responsibility so that these strategies and tactics are met.

== Concept development and experimentation (CD&E) ==
Strategic communication is subject to multinational CD&E, led by the military, because communication is applicable to crisis management and compliance strategies. Across the spectrum of missions and broadly covering all levels of involvement in a civil-military, comprehensive approach context, the function of strategic communication and its military tool for implementation – information operations – have evolved and are still under development, in particular concerning their exact delineation of responsibilities and the integration of non-military and non-coalition actors.

Three major lines of development are acknowledged as state of the art, with practical impact on current crisis management operations and/or multinational interoperability: (1) U.S. national developments, which one can argue have resulted in the most mature concepts for both strategic communication and information operations so far; (2) NATO concept development, which in the case of strategic communication is very much driven by current mission requirements (such as ISAF in Afghanistan), but also has benefitted from multinational CD&E in the case of information operations; and (3) multinational CD&E projects such as the U.S.-led Multinational Experiment (MNE) series and the Multinational Information Operations Experiment (MNIOE), led by Germany.

Intensive discussions involving civil and military practitioners of strategic communication and information operations - with a view on existing national and NATO approaches to strategic communication - have questioned whether an updated approach and definition of strategic communication is required. Consequently, a reorientation of CD&E efforts was suggested, focussing on "Integrated Communication," which reflects the shared baseline assessment with a broader scope, including but not limited to strategic communication:

- the ineffective top-down approach to communication (mission-specific, strategic-political guidance for information activities; information strategy; corporate vision; shared narrative) and
- the insufficient horizontal and vertical integration of communication (cohesion of a coalition; corporate identity; cultural awareness; communication by words and deeds - the "say-do-gap"; involvement of non-coalition actors - participatory communication).

This change should prevent false expectations of potential customers of resulting concepts who currently are reluctant to engage in CD&E on the implemented subject of strategic communication.

== See also ==
- Audience analysis
- Brand management
- Impression management
- Marketing communications
- Media intelligence
- Media manipulation
- Reputation management
- Public diplomacy
- Public relations

== Sources ==
- Tatham S A Cdr, RN. "Strategic Communication : A Primer" (PDF). UK Defence Academy. December 2008. Archived from the original (PDF) on January 24, 2009.
