= Stars and Stripes (newspaper) =

American military newspaper

- August 20, 2026 issue of Stars and Stripes
- Type: Daily newspaper
- Format: Tabloid
- Owner: Defense Media Activity
- Publisher: William Urban (military deputy to the publisher)
- Editor-in-chief: vacant
- Managing editor: Ann Pinson; Digital managing editor
- General manager: Laura Law (chief operating officer)
- Founded: 1861; 165 years ago
- Language: English
- Headquarters: 633 3rd St. NW, Suite 500; Washington, DC 20001-3050
- Country: United States; Mideast; Europe; Pacific
- ISSN: 0894-8542
- OCLC number: 8777119
- Website: stripes.com

Stars and Stripes (stylized in all caps) is a daily American military newspaper reporting on matters concerning the members of the United States Armed Forces and their communities, with an emphasis on those serving outside the United States. It operates from inside the Department of Defense, but is editorially separate from it, and its First Amendment protection is safeguarded by the United States Congress, to whom an independent ombudsman, who serves the readers' interests, regularly reports. As well as a website, Stars and Stripes publishes a global daily print edition for U.S. military service members serving overseas Monday through Friday. This global edition is also available as a free download in electronic format. The newspaper's headquarters is in Washington, D.C.

== History ==
=== Foundation ===
On November 9, 1861, during the American Civil War, soldiers of the 11th, 18th, and 29th Illinois Regiments set up camp in the Missouri city of Bloomfield. Finding the local newspaper's office empty, they decided to print a newspaper about their activities. They called it the Stars and Stripes. The newspaper printed four editions before ceasing publication until the start of World War I. Stars and Stripes Museum/Library Association is located in Bloomfield and contains the first print edition of the newspaper.

=== World War I ===
During World War I, the Department of Defense took control of Stars and Stripes. The newspaper was published by the American Expeditionary Forces (AEF) in France from February 8, 1918, to June 13, 1919. The goal of Stars and Stripes was to raise morale and strengthen the unity of American troops. The newspaper was called the "official newspaper of the AEF", but was editorially independent of it.

Stars and Stripes was popular in the American Army, and the first issue, with a circulation of one thousand copies, quickly sold out. The newspaper was weekly and featured wide columns, various illustrations and headlines made of capital letters. It also featured humor, poems by American soldiers and advertisements. The newspaper cost 50 French centimes per copy and consisted of eight pages. It covered news both at the front and in the United States. The newspaper was distributed in France by soldiers from Army Post Office, called "field agents", using trucks, cars and rail.

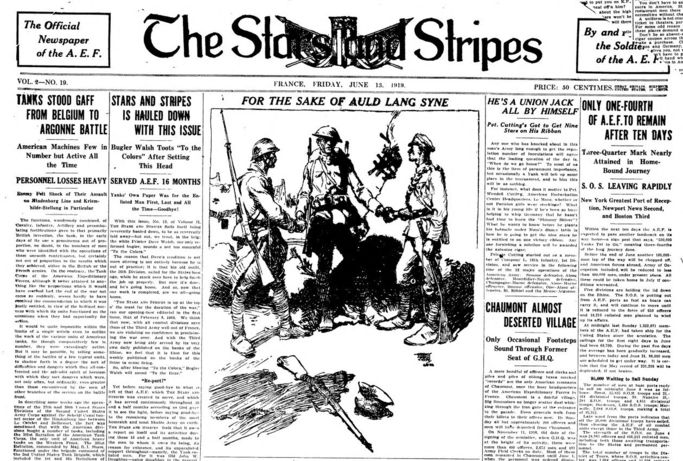
The last issue of the WWI Stars and Stripes on June 13, 1919

The newspaper was endorsed by American army general John J. Pershing, who wrote in the first issue of Stars and Stripes: "The paper, written by the men in the service, should speak the thoughts of the new American Army and the American people from whom the Army has been drawn. It is your paper. Good luck to it". In May 1919, The New York Times described the newspaper as "well-written, impartial and trustworthy” and "not too serious" because "no soldier wants to read what he calls the 'heavy stuff' in his service newspaper”.

The staff, roving reporters, and illustrators of the Stars and Stripes were veteran reporters and young soldiers who became reporters in the post-war years. Harold Ross, editor of the Stars and Stripes, went on to become the founder of The New Yorker magazine. Cyrus Baldridge, its art director and principal illustrator, became a major illustrator of books and magazines, as well as a writer, print maker and stage designer. Sports page editor Grantland Rice had a long career in journalism and founded a motion picture studio called Grantland Rice Sportlight.

The newspaper's final issue, published on June 13, 1919, featured a cartoon titled For the Sake Of Auld Lang Syne, which depicted three Allied soldiers shaking hands near a discarded German rifle. Throughout its 16-month existence during World War I, the newspaper earned $700,000, selling 526,000 copies.

=== World War II ===
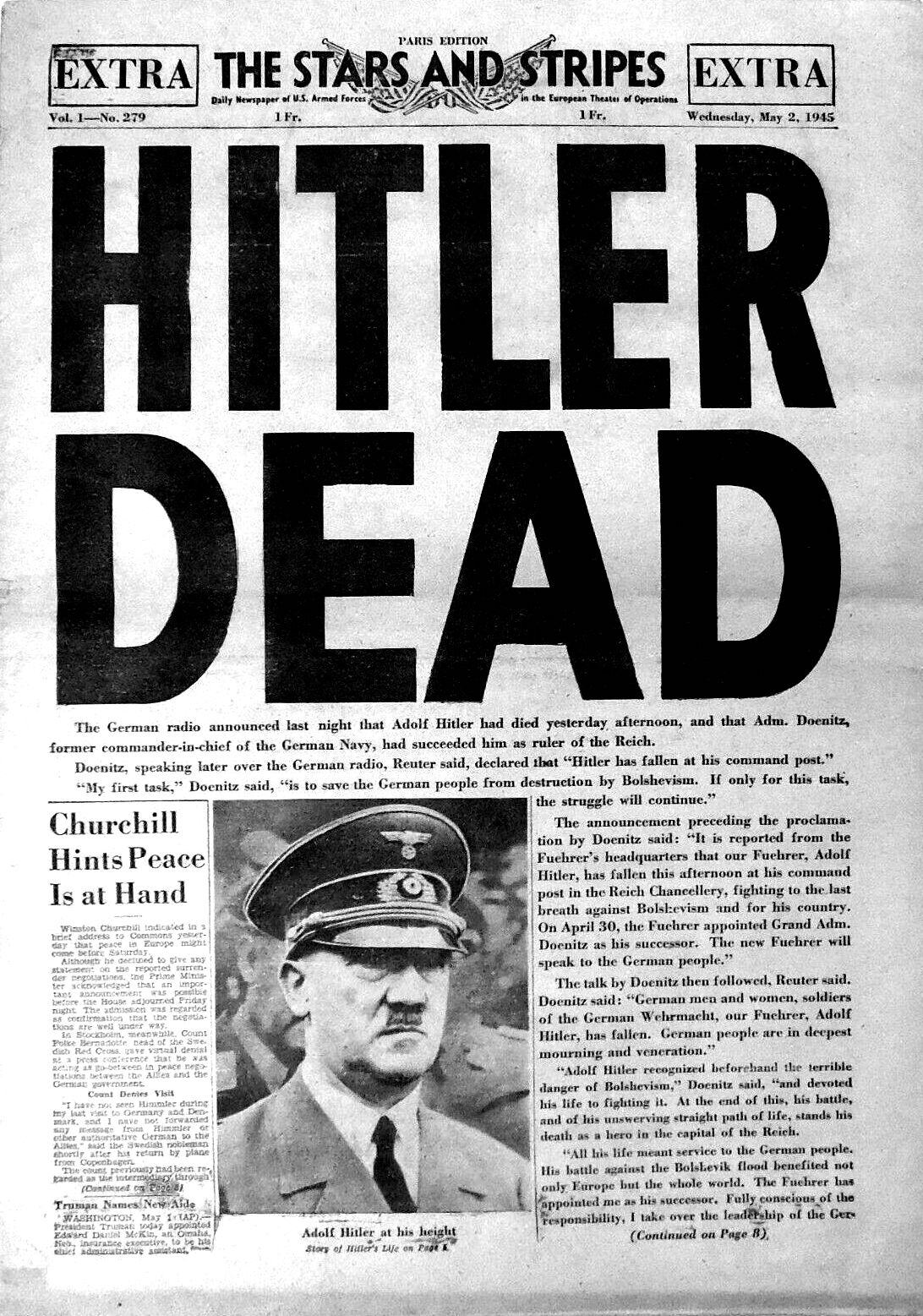
On May 2, 1945, Stars and Stripes announced Hitler's death.

Stars and Stripes ceased publication at the end of World War I, but was reactivated at the beginning of World War II and has been published continuously since then. The first edition of the newspaper was published on April 18, 1942 and featured a letter to Adolf Hitler, saying; “Dear Adolph: We know your stooges will get this paper into their hands at an early date. Suggest you read at once”.

During the war, Stars and Stripes was published in London by Office of War Information. The newspaper was printed in European and African operating theaters. The staff of Stars and Stripes included both newspapermen in army uniform and young soldiers, some of whom would later become important journalists. Some of the editions were assembled and printed very close to the front in order to get the latest information to the most troops. Also, during the war, the newspaper published the 53-book series G.I. Stories. The series consisted of 53 booklets, each containing thirty-two pages of text. The booklets told the stories of various American divisions in the European theater. The Rome edition of the newspaper closed in 1945 and its printing press was transferred to the new Rome Daily American in an arrangement facilitated by the CIA. In January 1945, the newspaper's daily readership was estimated to be at 1.2 million.

At the end of World War II, the staff of Stars and Stripes was replaced by civilian journalists. A small group of military journalists and photographers remained. After Bill Mauldin did his popular "Up Front" cartoons for the World War II Stars and Stripes, he returned to the US as a editorial cartoonist and two-time winner of the Pulitzer Prize. Pulitzer Prize-winning American journalist and war correspondent Ernie Pyle was regularly published in the Stars and Stripes. The magazine frequently posted photographs of a young Marilyn Monroe, then known as Norma Jeane Dougherty, which later led her as being named "Miss Cheesecake 1952" by Stars and Stripes.

=== Modern era ===
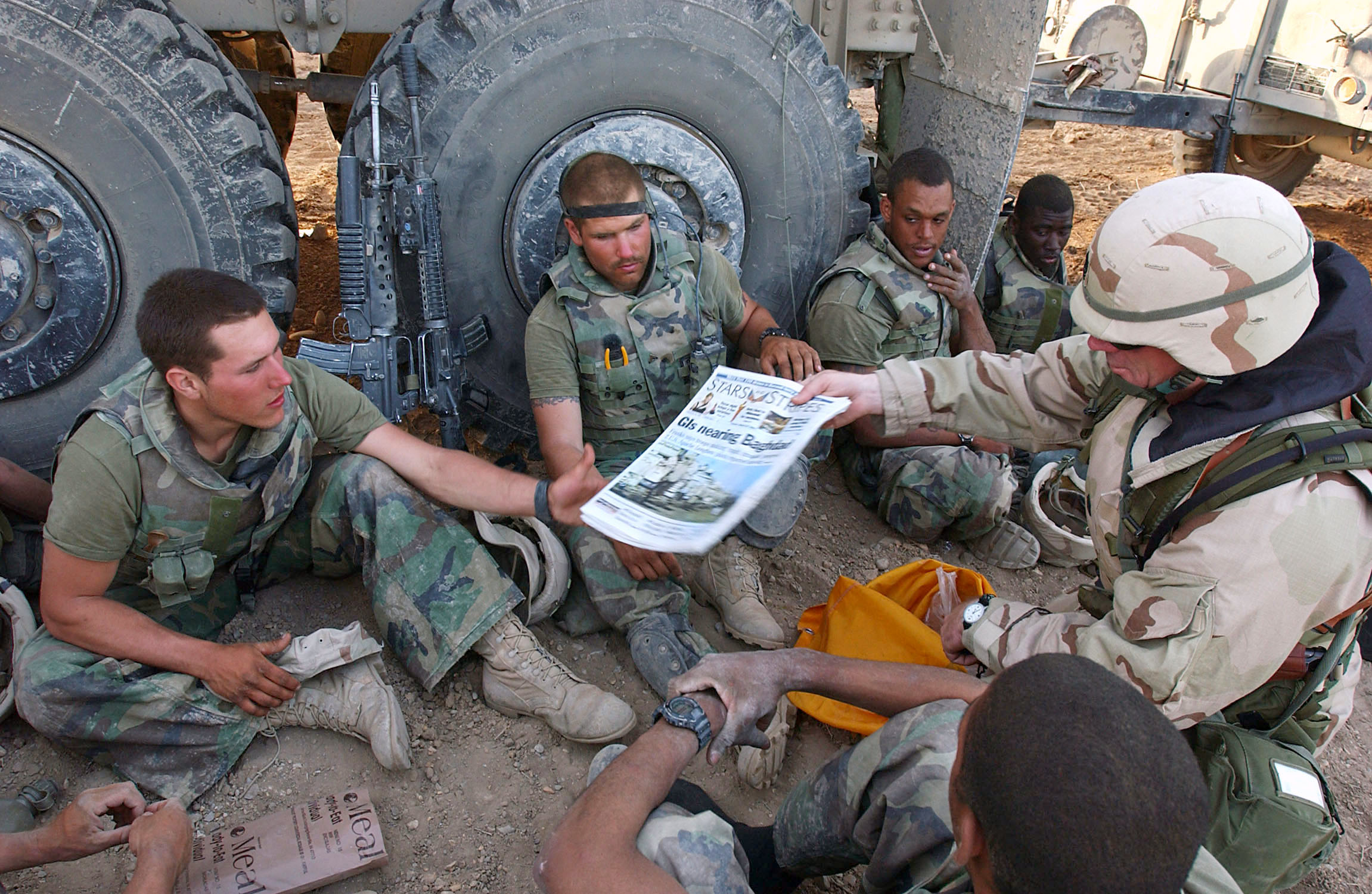
Stars and Stripes being delivered to US troops, 2003

Journalists of Stars and Stripes covered the Korean War and the Vietnam War from the combat zones. The paper covered the 1991 Gulf War, for which it established a Middle East bureau. The paper's circulation doubled during the war. During the 2003 invasion of Iraq, the paper's reporters worked from US Navy ships, as well as in Kuwait and Iraq, working closely with American military units. The paper covered troop movements and military exercises.

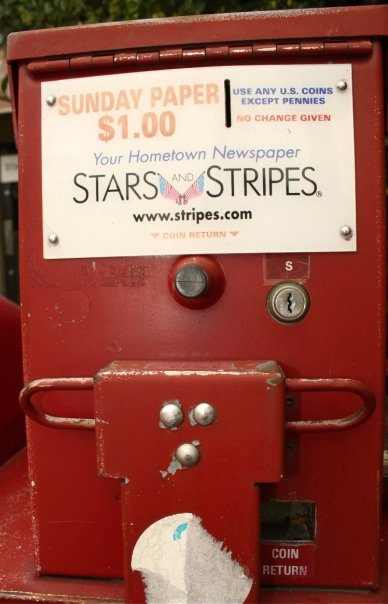
Stars and Stripes newspaper box in Seoul, July 2009

In April 2004, Pacific, European and Middle East editions of Stars and Stripes became available in digital format for free. In 2010, the paper won the George Polk Award for its coverage of the Pentagon's attempts to influence journalists to report on the war in Afghanistan in a more favorable way. The funding and relevance in the digital age have threatened the paper's budget. In 2013, the paper faced job cuts, printing-schedule changes, a pay-raise freeze and travel limitations for staff under the Federal budget sequestration. The print newspapers provide the news back home to service members who are forward-deployed in areas lacking reliable internet access. Coverage of pay and benefits is of direct concern to service members and their families along with life on base and in the field. The paper helps them be better-informed citizens about global geopolitics. Budget cuts by the Pentagon were again considered in 2016.

On May 21, 2019, a documentary film about Stars and Stripes, titled The World’s Most Dangerous Paper Route, was released. The film showcased the work of Stars and Stripes correspondents who deliver news from war zones like Iraq and Afghanistan.

The Wall Street Journal reported in February 2020, that a draft budget would reduce the newspaper's federal support in 2021 under a $5 billion shift to higher priorities in the defense budget. Deputy Under Secretary of Defense Elaine McCusker indicated its funding would be cut and said: "We have essentially decided that, you know, kind of coming into the modern age that newspaper is probably not the best way that we communicate any longer." The subsidy is more than $15 million a year, which represents approximately half the publication's budget and roughly 0.002 percent of the Department of Defense budget, which was $721.5 billion in 2020. It was described by the Stars and Stripes ombudsman as "a fatal cut".

In September, 2020, Defense Secretary Mark Esper justified the decision to discontinue publication of the paper as a result of his department-wide budget review. An order for the newspaper to shutter was issued, specifically by presenting a plan for it to dissolve by September 15, including "specific timeline for vacating government owned/leased space worldwide" and to end publication by September 30, 2020. Senator Dianne Feinstein (D-CA) led a bipartisan group opposed to the move, including Tammy Duckworth (D-IL), a veteran, and Susan Collins (R-ME). On September 4, US president Donald Trump appeared to reverse this position by tweeting that funding would not be cut. On September 30 the order to close was rescinded.

== Partisan interference in 2026 ==
In January 2026, The Washington Post reported that job applicants to the newspaper were being asked to answer partisan questions under directives issued by the Office of Personnel Management. The next day, the Pentagon announced an overhaul of the newspaper's editorial policies. Pentagon spokesman Sean Parnell said that Stars and Stripes content would be refocused "away from woke distractions that syphon morale". Jacqueline Smith, the newspaper's ombudsman, called the plans "contrary to the news organization's mission". The Pentagon fired Smith in April 2026 without explanation. Smith surmised it had to do with her criticism of the administration's plans.

In March 2026, the Pentagon issued a memo ordering Stars and Stripes to stop publishing certain types of content to adhere to interim military policies, including most stories from wire services like the Associated Press and Reuters. The memo states content must be "consistent with good order and discipline," a phrase found in the Uniform Code of Military Justice.

In August 2026, William Urban, an active-duty Navy captain and public affairs officer, was appointed military deputy to the publisher, Max Lederer. Later that month, Lederer, who became the publisher of Stars and Stripes in 2007, announced his retirement at the end of September, stating that it had "become clear that my philosophy of leadership, and my understanding of the value and mission of Stars and Stripes, differ in fundamental ways from the direction the leadership of the Department of Defense has for the organization".

On August 21, 2026, it was reported that Lederer, editor-in-chief Erik Slavin, and Middle East reporter Lara Korte had been fired by the Pentagon for insubordination. Slavin said his firing notice also cited an unauthorized interview with CBS News in July, in which he expressed his support for independent news for service members over an obligation to follow Pentagon orders. Journalism organizations condemned the firings, calling them manipulation of independent reporting by Pete Hegseth. Some reports linked the firings to the newspaper's recent coverage of the worsening conditions aboard the USS Abraham Lincoln. The firings were reported as another instance of how the Trump administration was growing increasingly aggressive towards the news media.

On August 27, 2026, Lederer, Slavin and Korte filed a lawsuit against the Pentagon and Pete Hegseth. The lawsuit alleged that the firings violated their First Amendment rights and administrative laws, and asked for their reinstatement at the newspaper. On August 28 a judge granted the three a one-week reprieve from being dismissed. The journalists contend they were fired as a result of their coverage of poor mental health issues aboard the Lincoln.

== Operations ==
Stars and Stripes is authorized by Congress and the U.S. Department of Defense to produce independent daily military news and information distributed at U.S. military installations in Europe and Mideast and East Asia. A weekly derivative product is distributed within the United States by its commercial publishing partners. Stars and Stripes newspaper averages 32 pages each day and is published in tabloid format and online at www.stripes.com/epaper. With the website, a social media presence and a couple of podcasts, it is a modern multimedia operation. Stars and Stripes employs civilian reporters, and U.S. military senior non-commissioned officers as reporters, at a number of locations around the world, and on any given day has an audience just shy of 1.0 million. Stars and Stripes also serves independent military news and information to an online audience of about 2.0 million unique visitors per month, 60 to 70 percent of whom are located in the United States.

Stars and Stripes is a non-appropriated fund (NAF) organization, only partially subsidized by the Department of Defense. A large portion of its operating costs is earned through the sale of advertising and subscriptions but it relies on government funding to back overseas reporting and distribution. Unique among the many military publications, Stars and Stripes operates as a First Amendment newspaper and is part of the Defense Media Activity, formed in 2005. The other entities encompassed by the Defense Media Activity (the DoD News Channel and Armed Forces Radio and Television Service, for example), are command publications of the Department of Defense; only Stars and Stripes maintains complete editorial independence.

Stars and Stripes is in the process of digitizing its World War II editions. Newspaper microfilm from 1949 to 1999 is now in searchable format through a partnership with Heritage Microfilm and has been integrated into an archives website. Newspaper Archive has also more recently made the England, Ireland and Mediterranean editions from World War II available.

== Former staffers ==
Notable former Stars and Stripes staffers include: CBS 60 Minutes' Andy Rooney and Steve Kroft; songwriter and author Shel Silverstein; comic book illustrator Tom Sutton; authors Gustav Hasford and Ralph G. Martin; cartoonist Bill Mauldin; painter and cartoonist Paul Fontaine; author and television news correspondent Tony Zappone; cartoonist Vernon Grant (A Monster Is Loose in Tokyo); Hollywood photographer Phil Stern; New Hampshire politician Daniel M. Burnham and stock market reporter and host of public television's Wall Street Week, Louis Rukeyser, and the only Black reporter in WWII, Allan Morrison. Patricia Collins Hughes was a former WASP and advocate for WASP veteran status.

Dan Stoneking was the editor of Stars and Stripes during the Vietnam War while based in Tokyo.

== In popular culture ==
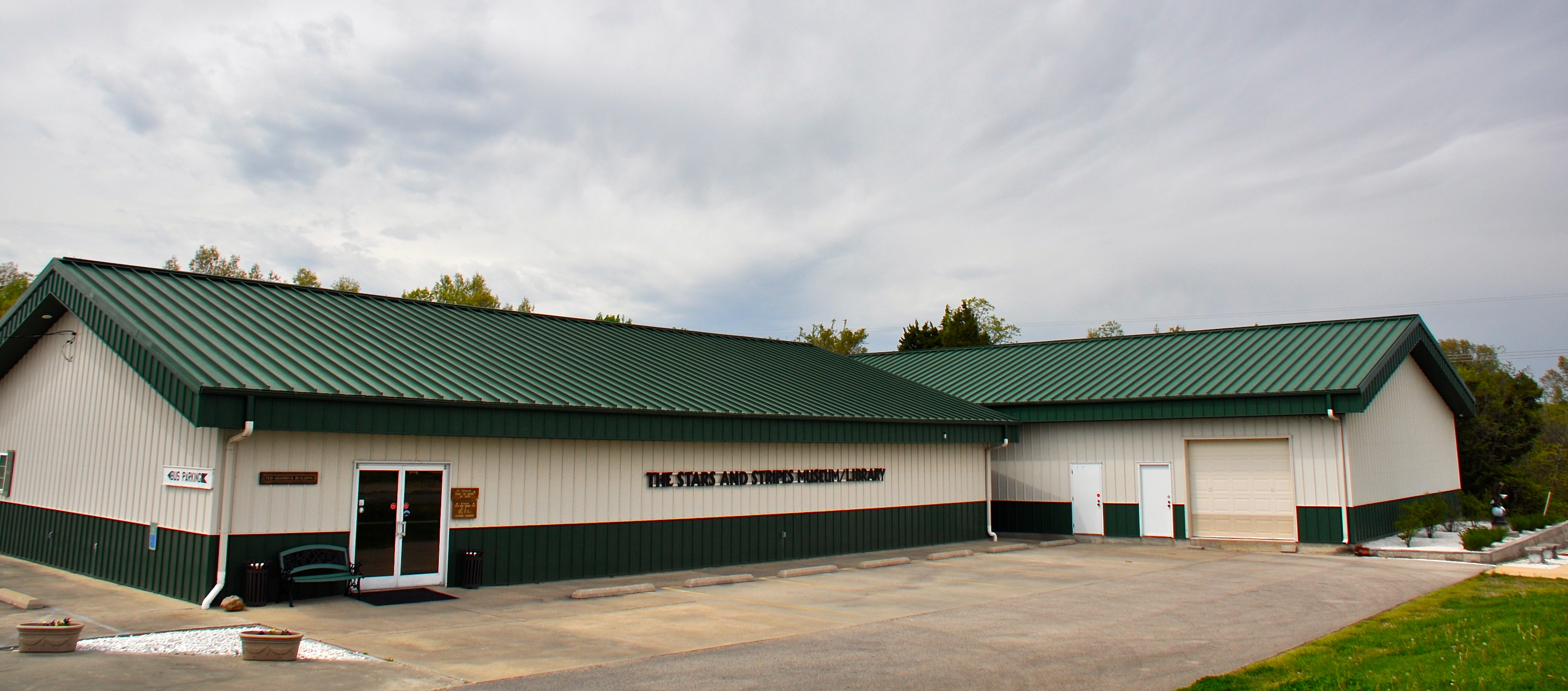
The Stars and Stripes Museum at Bloomfield, Stoddard County, Missouri

A photograph in Stars and Stripes loosely inspired the exploits of PFC Jack Agnew in the 1965 novel and its 1967 film adaptation, The Dirty Dozen.

American comic strips have been presented in a 15-page section, Stripes' Sunday Comics.

Sergeant J.T. "Joker" Davis and Private First Class "Rafterman" are a war correspondent and combat photographer, respectively, stationed in Da Nang for Stars and Stripes in Stanley Kubrick's 1987 film Full Metal Jacket.

== See also ==
- Ensley Llewellyn
- List of newspapers in Washington, D.C.
- Yank, the Army Weekly
