= Dust storm (disambiguation) =

A dust storm is a meteorological phenomenon in which strong winds move loose sand and dirt.

Dust Storm or Duststorm may also refer to:

- Dust Storm (Manter, Kansas), a work of art by John Gerrard
- Dust Storm (Transformers), a female Decepticon in the Transformers franchise
- The Dust Storm, a 2015 film
- Dust Storm, dam of the American Thoroughbred race horse Dust Commander
- Dust storm warning, as issued by the United States National Weather Service
- "Dust Storm", song by Third Eye Blind from Our Bande Apart, 2021
