= Libbey, Oklahoma =

Unincorporated community in Oklahoma, United States

Coordinates: 36°56′14″N 101°58′30″W

Libbey or Libby Siding is a settlement in northwest Texas County, Oklahoma, situated in the Oklahoma Panhandle, at an elevation of 3,724 feet. It is located approximately six miles southwest of Elkhart, Kansas on US Route 56. It is on the Atchison, Topeka and Santa Fe Railroad.

Libbey was the locale for Irish artist John Gerrard’s internationally-displayed exhibition, “Sow Farm (near Libbey, Oklahoma) 2009,” shot around an agricultural facility there.
