= John Gerrard (artist) =

Irish artist (born 1974)

- Born: 20 July 1974 (age 52); Dublin, Ireland
- Education: The Ruskin School of Drawing and Fine Art, Oxford; Art Institute of Chicago; Trinity College, Dublin
- Known for: Sculpture, Installation art
- Notable work: "Western Flag (Spindletop, Texas) 2017" [2017] "Farm (Pryor Creek, Oklahoma) 2015" [2015] "Solar Reserve (Tonopah, Nevada) 2014" [2014] Exercise (Djibouti, 2012) [2012] Cuban School (Community 5th of October) 2010 [2010] "Lufkin (near Hugo, Colorado) 2009" [2009]

John Gerrard (born 20 July 1974) is an Irish artist, best known for his sculptures, which typically take the form of digital simulations displayed using real-time computer graphics.

== Education ==
Gerrard received a BFA from The Ruskin School of Drawing and Fine Art, Oxford University. During this time he made his first experiments with 3D scanning as a form of sculptural photography. He undertook postgraduate studies at The School of The Art Institute of Chicago and Trinity College, Dublin, and in 2002 was awarded a Pépinières Residency at Ars Electronica, Linz, where he developed his first works in 3D Real-time computer graphics. In June 2009 he began a six-month guest residency at the Rijksakademie van Beeldende Kunsten, Amsterdam. During 2012 he was Legacy Fellow at Magdalen College, Oxford, working on Exercise (Djibouti) 2012, a commission for Modern Art Oxford and the London 2012 Festival.

== Works ==
Gerrard's works concern themselves with the nature of contemporary power in the broadest sense, epitomising the structures of power and the networks of energy that characterized the massive expansion and intensification of human endeavour that took place during the twentieth century. Many works have featured geographically isolated industrial facilities that are a hidden part of the global production network that makes the luxuries of contemporary life possible. As Emily Hall wrote in ArtForum:

[Gerrard's] fine balance of concept, content, and material suggest a theme and variations on the theme of the virtual. The computer-generated landscapes bring to mind, of course, virtual worlds, video games, special effects – that is, ways of producing unrealities. Here the format manifests something quite real, albeit at the periphery of most of our worlds – the discomfort of this admission is part of the work's impact – since for many of us, the arrival of food in our markets and the availability of oil are things we take on faith, if we think about them at all. Their existence remains provisional – more or less virtual – whether in life, on a gallery wall, or on a computer chip.

Gerrard's works are constructed as simulations or virtual worlds, using 3D Real-time computer graphics – a technology originally developed for military use, and now used extensively in the videogame industry (he currently uses Unigine 3D engine). Although making use of advanced digital technology, Gerrard's work has been noted for its resistance to being categorised as 'new media art'. Gerrard himself regards realtime 3D as 'a post-cinematic medium in which one can manipulate and interact with time in new ways'. He has also said that the works constitute a continuing reflection upon his own time: 'these melancholic realms are in some way a road movie of the Twentieth Century, a revisiting of the extraordinary comforts and freedoms that I've experienced.'

The eerie hyperrealism that characterises the medium, and Gerrard's choice of industrial subjects, has led some to compare his work with Charles Sheeler's 'precisionism'. Gerrard's interest in minimalism and postminimalism is evident in the physical presence of his installed objects, which are presented either as large-scale projections that often push the boundaries of existing technology, or as compact 'artboxes', designed in collaboration with Inseq, an industrial design firm in Vienna.

=== Working method ===
The production of Gerrard's works is a highly labor-intensive, collaborative affair, which he has described as 'very similar to making films, in that a group of specialists is assembled under a director to make something ... making these works is beyond the capabilities of any one person.'

Working initially from research documents, texts or striking images in the popular press, Gerrard uses the internet as a research tool, in what he calls 'image wandering'. This subsequently leads to exploratory journeys, during which subjects are often discovered by chance. Once a structure is selected for a 'portrait', the artist takes a comprehensive set of several thousand photographs of surfaces and surroundings. These photographs are used in the studio as textures for a reconstructed, hand-built virtual 3d model of the structure, which in turn is then placed within a 'virtual world' that incorporates the passing of time and other environmental elements.

While they use the same software that is employed for intensively interactive gaming environments, the works offer the viewer no freedom of movement, and generally feature a slow camera path that orbits a silent, isolated scene. In relation to this movement, Gerrard says that his understanding of this medium is 'profoundly orbital. The works stage a world, in which certain set of behaviors have been put in motion. One of them is what I call an orbital camera, a camera that moves, at walking pace, around the scene – the human presence: being there, the witness. And then of course you have the orbit of the year which is linked to the real and which forbids an easy, instant consumption of the scene, because it takes a full year to unfold in full. But then, crucially, this world, this reality, consists of one moment in time. Not an instantaneous moment, but the time during which I documented the scene'

Recent works such as the Exercise series have increasingly featured simulated human figures, produced using Motion Capture, and have experimented with the use of algorithmic components to produce action within the work that is unforeseeable to the artist himself.

=== Farm (Pryor Creek, Oklahoma) 2015 [2015] ===
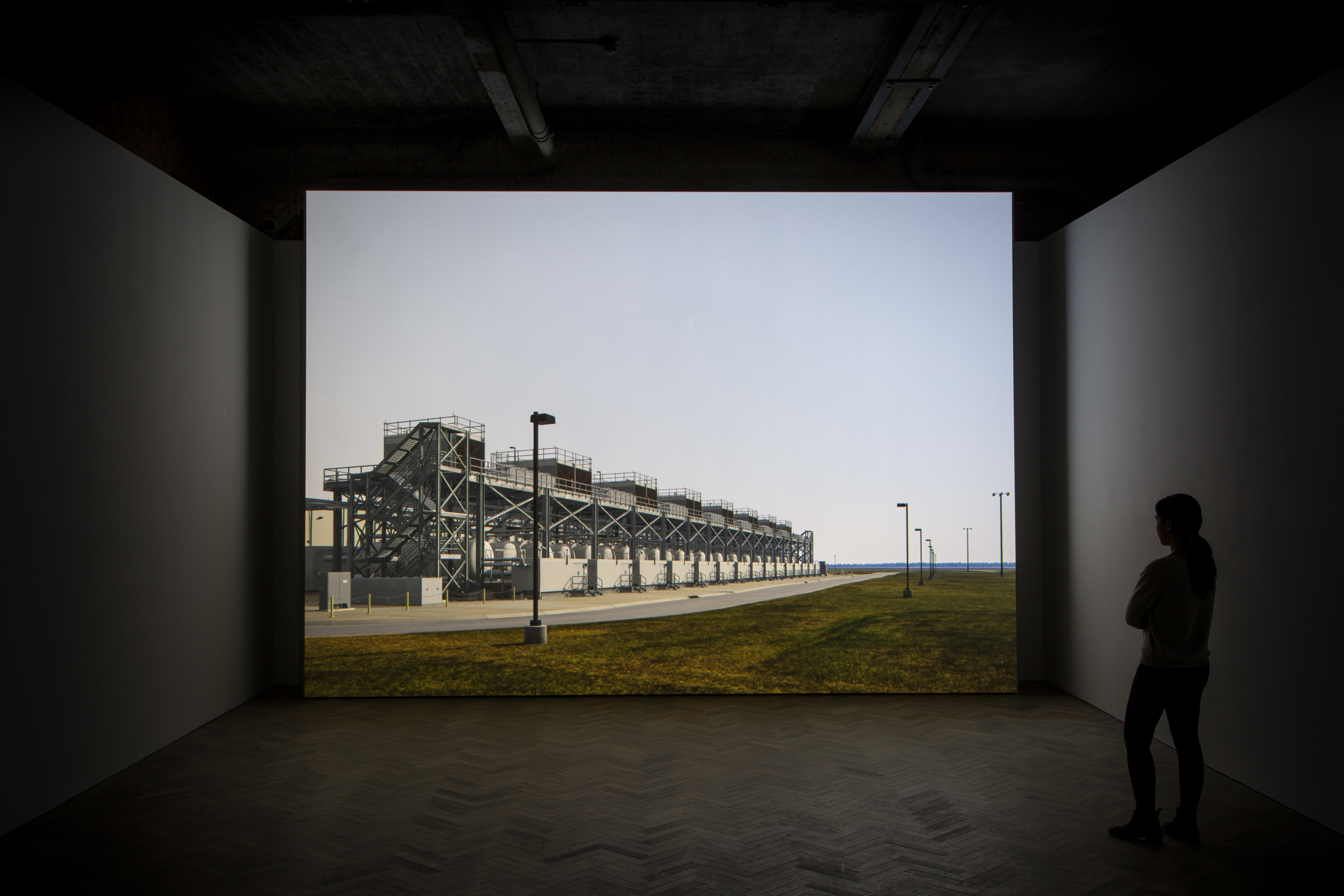
Farm (Pryor Creek, Oklahoma) 2015, by John Gerrard. Installed at Thomas Dane Gallery, London, 5 February – 21 March 2015

In early 2014, following denial of access by Google, Gerrard hired a helicopter and produced a detailed photographic survey of one of the key physical sites of the internet—a Google data farm in Oklahoma. This survey was the starting point of the work Farm (Pryor Creek, Oklahoma) 2015. The work features a simulated "twin" of the squat building flanked by diesel generators and powerful cooling towers, as seen from a virtual camera orbiting the facility. As suggested by the title, the architecture of the server farm bears marked resemblance to Gerrard's earlier works depicting livestock facilities, Grow Finish Unit and Sow Farm, Gerrard states that he wants the work to pose the following questions: "What does the internet look like? What are the material qualities of the network? How is it powered? Do we consume this facility—or does it consume us?"

Critical response included:

We don’t question where these things come from, they just appear, but Gerrard wants to confront all of that. He wants to unshroud the mysteries behind our Facebook feeds and push notifications.

— Eddy Frankel, Time Out, 20 February 2015

[T]he effect […] is more painterly than cinematic. It is like a 16th century Dutch still life moving in very slow motion. The effect is mesmerising and disorienting, your understanding of the real and the record and the representation shaken and shifted.

– Nick Compton, Wallpaper, 10 February 2015

=== Solar Reserve (Tonopah, Nevada) 2014 [2014] ===
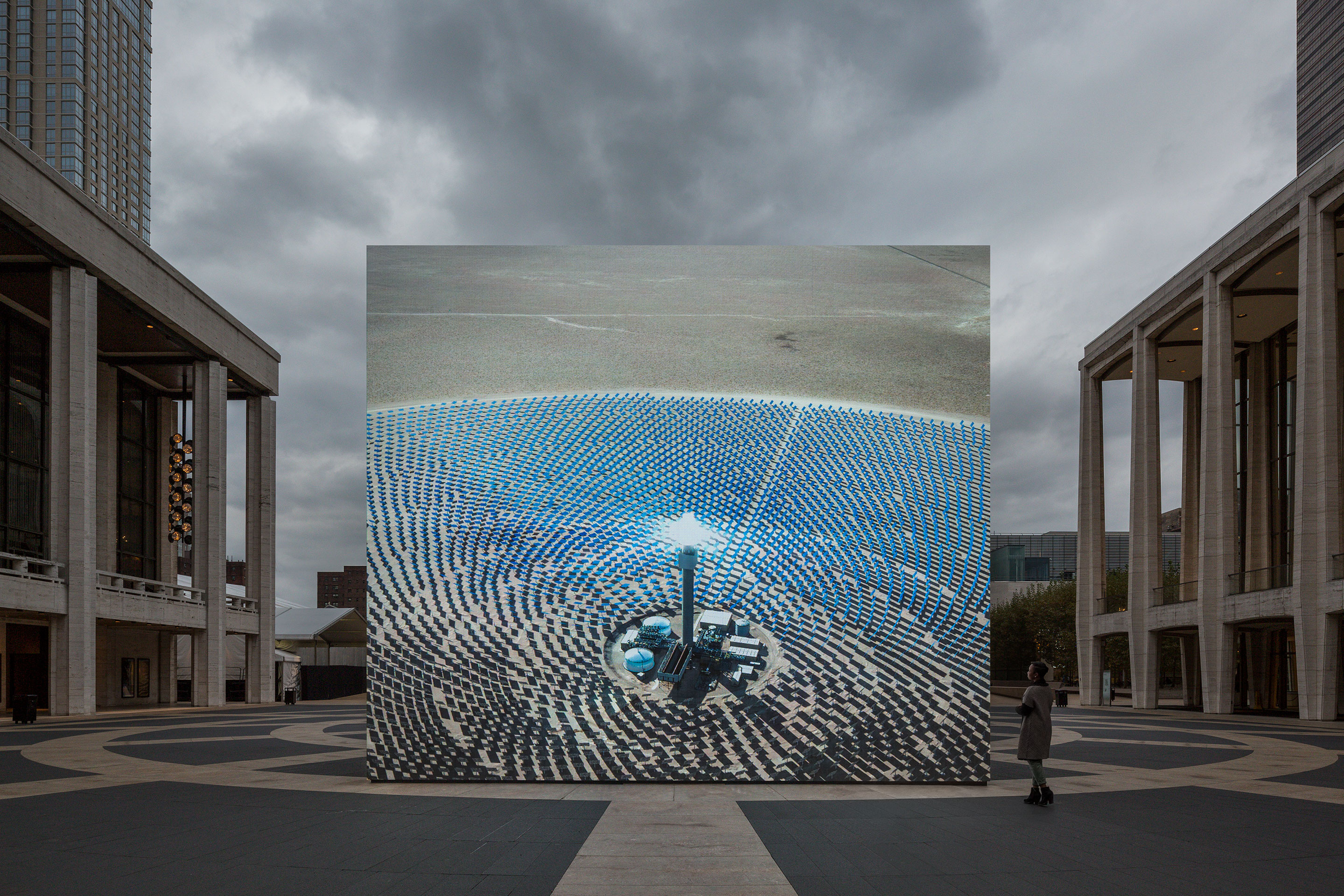
Solar Reserve, by John Gerrard. Installed at Lincoln Center, New York.

Solar Reserve (Tonopah, Nevada) 2014 features a simulated landscape showing computer-generated images of a solar thermal power plant in Nevada, whose central tower is surrounded by 10,000 mirrors which reflect sunlight onto it to heat salt to high temperatures, forming a thermal battery which is used to generate electricity. Over the course of a 365-day year, the work replicates the movements of the sun, moon, and stars across the sky as they would appear at the Nevada site. The mirrors adjust their positions in real time according to the position of the sun. Over a 24-hour period the virtual camera view of the tower shifts, following the movement of the mirrors, from ground level to an overhead satellite view.

"Solar Reserve" was displayed on an artist-designed frameless LED wall on the Lincoln Center's Josie Robertson Plaza in New York in October–December 2014. Public response was favourable, with many visitors disseminating images of the work via Instagram (public images of "Solar Reserve" at Lincoln Centre).

In June 2015 it was announced that actor Leonardo DiCaprio planned to donate Solar Reserve to the Los Angeles County Museum of Art. It was reported that DiCaprio's donation to LACMA was linked to his advocacy for environmental causes.

=== Pulp Press (Kistefos) 2013 [2013] ===
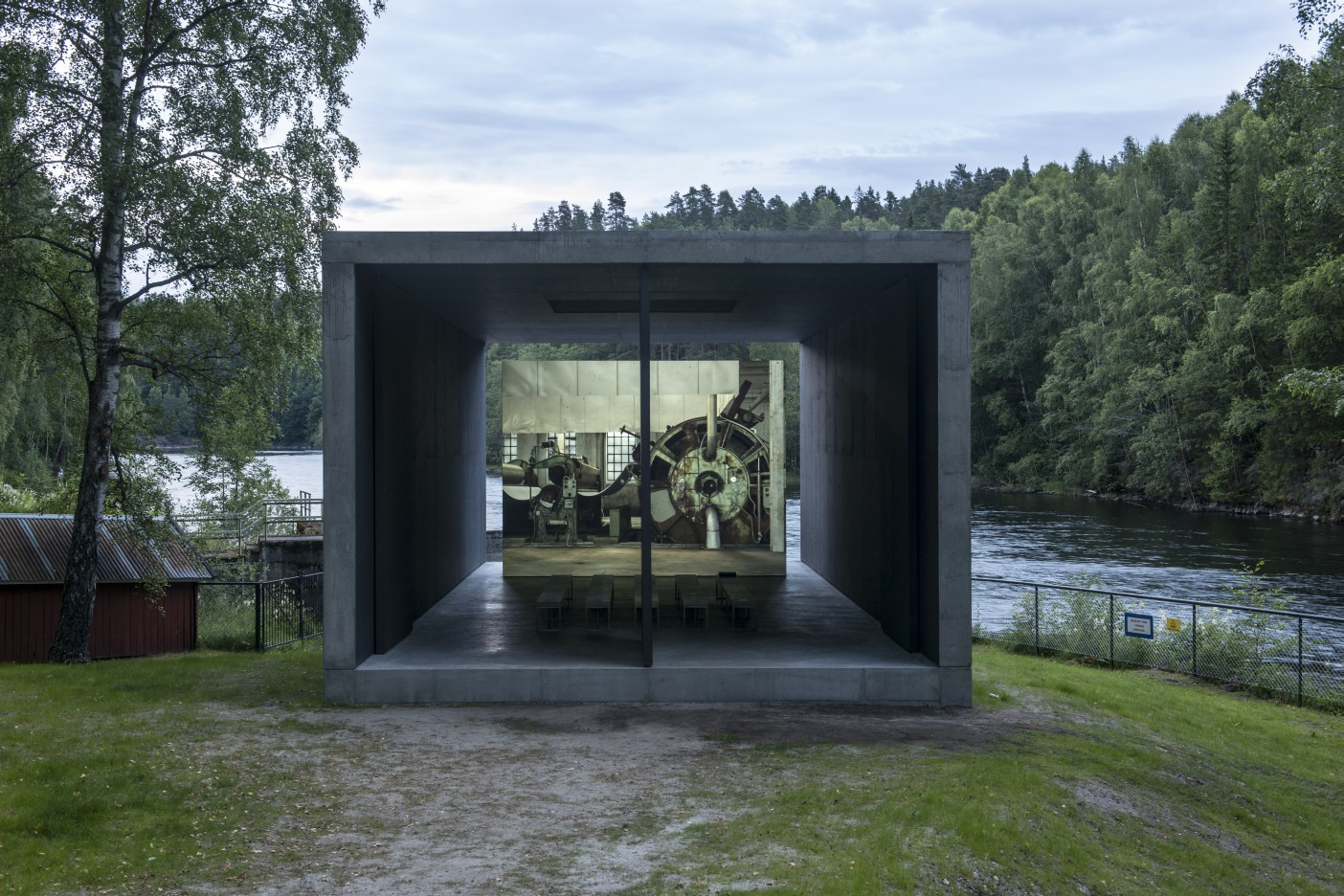
Pulp Press (Kistefos) 2013, by John Gerrard. Installed at Kistefos-Museet Sculpture Park, Jevnaker, Norway

Pulp Press (Kistefos) 2013 is situated in the grounds of the Kistefos-Museet Sculpture Park, the site of a nineteenth-century paper mill in Jevnaker, an hour north of Oslo, Norway.

Within a projected simulation, the original paper press operates continually, generating 'bales' of data using a physical modelling algorithm devised specially for the work. The bales are stored on hard drives each of which, when it reaches full capacity, is lodged inside the pavilion, thus providing a physical indicator of the accretion of virtual data. The simulation is housed in a 100m² poured concrete pavilion designed by the artist in collaboration with Dublin-based architects A2, with technical design and object production handled by Vienna-based Inseq Design.

=== Exercise ===
In a recent series of works under the collective title Exercise Gerrard has addressed what James der Derian has called the "military-industrial-media-entertainment network" – the convergence of media spectacle and military power, both operated through digital simulation technology. The work draws on sources such as the military simulation ARMA and the US army public media site dvidshub.

==== Live Fire Exercise [2011] ====
Live Fire Exercise, a collaboration with celebrated choreographer Wayne Mcgregor, uses Gerrard's simulation as a projected backdrop to McGregor's dance piece comprising a simulation of a massive explosion, and its subsequent fallout, in the Djibouti desert, which is used for US military training exercises.

Critical response included:

John Gerrard's backdrop ... is both alluring and sinister. […] Rarely does a new dancework offer quite so many satisfying interconnections.

– Jenny Gilbert, The Independent

Although [Gerrard's work] is of an African desert, it makes you think of Afghanistan and Iraq. With the same blank dispassion of a film such as The Hurt Locker it creates an alien landscape in which McGregor's six dancers, in Lucy Carter's half-light, grapple with the choreography of conflict. This sophisticated tapestry of movement is staggeringly beautiful, its pensive, slightly mournful mood engrossing. It is dance for people who like to think as well as feel, both abstract and real.

– Sarah Crompton, The Telegraph

The contrast between Gerrard's film event and Tippett's gentle pastorale is brutal in its irony, but McGregor's neo-balletic vocabulary, with its anguished grapplings and cradlings, unites the two. These are the scorched landscapes on which our privilege is built, these are the people who suffer so that we may not, this is the human body in hyperstress.

– Luke Jennings, The Observer

==== Infinite Freedom Exercise (Near Abadan, Iran) 2011 [2011] ====
In this public commission for Manchester International Festival, a virtual soldier in a simulated landscape executes an algorithmic cycle of gestures. Gerrard worked with a member of Wayne McGregor Random Dance, who was motion-captured moving into a number of postures that Gerrard took from photographs of military exercises on dvidshub. In the virtual world, they are triggered by an algorithm according to a set of rules developed in collaboration with McGregor.

==== Exercise (Djibouti) 2012 [2012] ====
Exercise (Djibouti) 2012 is the result of Gerrard's Legacy Fellowship at Magdalen College, Oxford, an alliance between Modern Art Oxford, Oxford University Sport and the Ruskin School of Drawing and Fine Art, to mark the London 2012 Summer Olympics. The work draws parallels between the spectacle of troops being exhaustively put through their paces as the representatives of power, and the global, celebratory spectacle of the Olympic Games.

On a simulacrum of the barren Djibouti landscape, two teams of computer-generated figures, wearing red and blue, the traditional colours of war gaming, meet daily at dawn to initiate a series of cryptic gestural routines. The figures represent a group of elite athletes who were engaged for the project during their training for the 2012 London Olympics and whose actual movements were subsequently digitised using motion capture technologies. Exercise exists in 'real time' (Djibouti: GMT +3 hours), orbiting over a yearly cycle that also incorporates the movements of sun, moon and stars.

==== Exercise (Dunhuang) 2014 [2014] ====
Exercise (Dunhuang) 2014 originated in satellite images that were the object of online discussion and speculation during 2011. The images show a mysterious structure in the heart of the Chinese desert, a precise system of roadways the size of a small town and apparently designed to be seen from orbit. Gerrard commissioned an American satellite imaging firm to depth-scan these markings, and visited the site to document it photographically, in order to digitally reconstruct the entire structure and its surrounding landscape. Into this simulation, the artist places motion-captured simulacra of thirty-nine workers from a Ghangzhou computer manufacturing plant, clothed in the blue uniforms and elasticated paper bonnets they wear for their work.

The workers' paths across the grid are calculated and determined by the A* search algorithm, as used in GPS routefinding systems. The work is exhibited as a three-screen installation showing views of this process from three different virtual cameras: from human head height, from the point of view of a circling low-flying drone, and from a satellite's distant overhead perspective. When two participants meet, the actor closest to their goal continues walking, while the other must sit or lie on the landscape and rest. After a period lasting between 24 and 36 hours, only one remains standing. The process then draws to a close, the actors reassemble at the centre of the scene, the ground-level point of view gravitates around the worker who endured the longest, and the exercise begins anew.

=== Animated Scene ===
This series of works by Gerrard features virtual reconstructions of historical events or existing structures on the contemporary landscape.

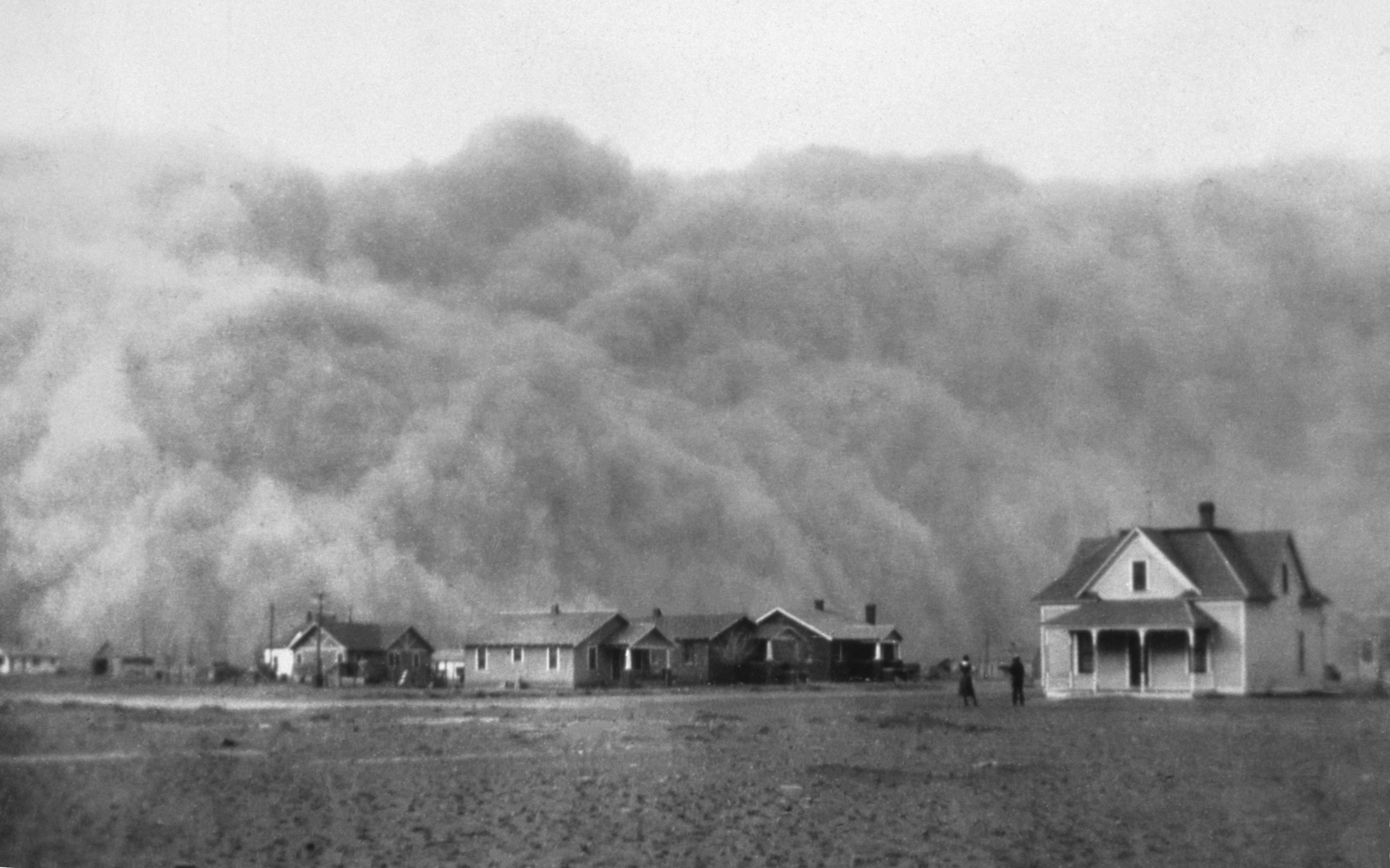
A dust storm approaches Stratford, Texas, in 1935.

In 2006, Gerrard discovered several photographic images, from 1935, of a vast dust storm travelling across Texas, in what were becoming the agri-industrial heartlands of the US. The photograph became the basis for Dust Storm (Dalhart, Texas) 2007, a work that consists of a virtual portrait of the landscape as it stands today, upon which is placed a realtime animated 3D model of the storm, like a slowly unfolding sculpture. This work led Gerrard to investigate further the history of the Dust Bowl as a crucial moment of the modern industrial age.

==== Dust Storm (Dalhart, Texas) 2007 [2007] / Dust Storm, 2007 [2007] ====
The Dust Storm works are virtual recreations of duststorms from found photographs, placed upon reconstructions of the landscape as it stands today.

Upon the Exhibition of the work at Art Chicago in 2008, critic Alan Artner led his review of the Fair with the headline 'A New Medium Emerges', opining that 'Not many times in life can anyone see an artist pioneer a significant new medium. But that is what we see in John Gerrard's Dust Storm (Manter, Kansas)'. Artner continues:

Dust Storm unites a classic image from the Great Depression with a contemporary industrial landscape, setting them in a cosmological orbit that is completed over the full spectrum of a year. The exploitation of oil that goes back to the beginning of the 20th Century is presented as the catalyst of conditions that led to the ecological disaster of Dust Bowl. But nothing is didactic. The pity in the subject comes to viewers subliminally through a visual poem of complexity and power.

Other critical responses included:

In a strange reversal, Dust Storm makes our contemporary thirst for oil, and an attendant blindness to its effects on the world, animate a historic catastrophe in the panhandle of George W. Bush’s home state, a disaster that was likewise driven by oil, rapaciousness, and willful ignorance of the consequences.

— Joseph Wolin, in Modern Painters

==== Grow Finish Unit (near Elkhart, Kansas) 2008 [2008] ====
Grow Finish Unit (near Elkhart, Kansas) 2008 depicts a pork production plant in the US midwest. Gerrard has stated that his visit to the Chinati Foundation at Marfa following the 2007 show Equal, That Is, To the Real Itself, and in particular seeing Donald Judd's 100 Untitled Works in Milled Aluminium, sensitised him to the recurrent forms of the pig production units he saw in the distance from the highway. Working with his partner Cesar Mejias Olmedo, he drove offroad to discover more about the structures, giving rise to Grow Finish Unit.

==== Sow Farm (Near Libbey, Oklahoma) 2009 [2009] ====
Sow Farm is a realtime portrait of a related agri-industrial complex in the midwest. A single transport truck pulls to each building every 156 days and waits for one hour. Behind the sheds lie large effluent lakes.

In 2015 Sow Farm was accessioned to the Tate Collection.

==== Lufkin (near Hugo, Colorado) 2009 [2009] ====
Lufkin is a portrait of an oil-pump discovered by Gerrard during his travels. It is significant in the light of the foregoing Animated Scene works that the pigs in Grow Finish Unit and Sow Farm are exclusively raised on corn which is in turn grown using nitrogen derived from oil and gas, thus rendering the occupants of these sheds, in essence, oil-derived animals. In turn, the depleted landscape of the Dust Storm works was the result of the use of mechanised petroleum-powered ploughing and intensive nitrogen-enabled agriculture.

==== Oil Stick Work (Angelo Martinez / Richfield, Kansas) 2008 [2008] ====
Oil Stick Work is the first work in which Gerrard integrated human figures into his portraits of architectural subjects. In Oil Stick Work, the character Angelo Martinez paints one square of his barn in oil stick crayon every day. It takes the whole day, from dawn till dusk, to complete this action. To complete the task will take the entire thirty years of the piece – from 2008 to 2038 (towards the end of the artist's own lifespan, as he notes in an interview.) Oil Stick Work was later shown for one full calendar year in Canary Wharf as part of Art on the Underground and has subsequently been exhibited in institutions globally.

==== Cuban School (Community 5 October) 2010 [2010] / Cuban School (Sancti Spiritu) 2011 [2011] ====
The schools depicted in this work belong to a period in Cuba's history when the optimism of early revolutionary socialist models of housing provision gave way to large-scale mass housing models. Like Oil Stick Work, the Cuban School works include a single human figure, in this case a female caretaker who walks through the building once a day, at dusk, to switch the lights off.

Critical response included:

Technology is the vehicle for this work, but it is not only the vehicle. Through it Gerrard manages to invoke the history of landscape painting, photography, and Earth art, and situates his work somewhere between documentary and fiction – between images that bring us news of places and situations that are foreign to us, and the kinds of invention (ideological, narrative, moral) that we undertake in order to comprehend them.

— Emily Hall, ArtForum

=== Early works ===
==== One Thousand Year Dawn (Marcel) [2005] ====
This realtime 3d work shows a beach scene with man staring out to sea. The rising of the sun within the virtual world is programmed to take place over a period of 1000 years, meaning that no viewer will ever be able to see the work in its entirety.

==== Portrait to Smile Once a Year, (Mary) [2006] ====
As the title suggests, this work consists of a realtime 3d portrait of a woman, Mary, who smiles once a year.

==== Smoke Trees [2006] ====
A series of works featuring realtime 3d models of trees which have smoke in place of foliage.

== Exhibitions ==
Gerrard has participated in group shows including "The Everyday Experience", Irish Museum of Modern Art (2013–14), "Constructing the View", Irish Museum of Modern Art (2013), "The Universal Addressability of Dumb Things", Bluecoat, Liverpool, UK (2013), "Out of the Ordinary", Hirshhorn Museum and Sculpture Garden, Washington DC (2013–14), "0 to 60: The Experience of Time in Contemporary Art", North Carolina Museum of Art (2013), "Open File: Long Live the New Flesh", ICA, London (2013), "Pursuit of Perfection: The Politics of Sport", South London Gallery/Southwark Old Town Hall, London (2012), "More Real? Art in the Age of Truthiness", SITE, Santa Fe (2012–13), "Marking Time", Museum of Contemporary Art, Australia (2012), "Visions Fugitives", Le Fresnoy Studio National des Arts Contemporains, BEYOND at Kumu Art Museum, Tallinn, Estonia (2011), 20/20, Irish Museum of Modern Art, Ireland (2011), EV+A, Limerick, Ireland, in collaboration with Peter Carroll. (2010), Infinitum at Palazzo Fortuny, Venice, (2009), Academia at L’Ecole de Beaux-Arts, Paris (2008), Equal, That Is, To the Real Itself, Marian Goodman Gallery, New York, Existencias, the Museo de Arte Contemporáneo de Castilla y León (2007).

Recent solo presentations of Gerrard's work include "Exercise", Kunsthalle Darmstadt (2015), "Farm", Thomas Dane Gallery, London (2015), "Sow Farm", Rathole Gallery, Tokyo (2015), "Solar Reserve", Lincoln Centre, New York (2014), "The Surface of the World: Architecture and the Moving Image", Museum of Contemporary Art and Design, Pasay, Philippines (2014), "Exercise (Djibouti) 2012", Screenspace, Melbourne (2014), "Exercise", Borusan Contemporary, Istanbul (2014), "Exercise", Simon Preston Gallery, New York (2013), "Exercise (Djibouti), 2012", Modern Art Oxford (2012), "John Gerrard", Middlesbrough Institute of Modern Art, UK, Infinite Freedom Exercise, Manchester International Festival, Manchester, UK (2011), John Gerrard, Ivory Press, Madrid, Spain (2011), John Gerrard, Perth Institute of Contemporary Art, Perth, Australia (2011), Universal, Void, The Void Derry, N. Ireland (2011), John Gerrard, Thomas Dane Gallery, London, UK (2010), Cuban School, Simon Preston Gallery, New York (2010), Sow Farm : What You See is Where You're At, Scottish National Gallery of Modern Art, Edinburgh, Scotland (2010), Oil Stick Work, Art on the Underground, Canary Wharf Station, London, UK (2009 / 10), Directions : John Gerrard, Hirshhorn Museum and Sculpture Garden, Washington DC, US (2009), and John Gerrard, Animated Scene, 53rd International Art Exhibition, La Biennale di Venezia, Italy (2009).

== Gallery representation ==
John Gerrard is represented by Pace Gallery, globally.

== Books ==
- James Der Derian, (2009) Virtuous Warfare: Mapping the Military-Industrial-Media-Entertainment Network New York: Routledge, 2009, ISBN 978-0-415-77239-6
- John Gerrard (2006) Dark Portraits Dublin: The Royal Hibernian Academy, 2006, ISBN 1-903875-36-6
- John Gerrard (2009) Animated Scene Vienna: Schlebrügge. Editor, 2009, ISBN 978-3-85160-154-1
- John Gerrard, Robin Mackay (Editor) (2010) John Gerrard Madrid: Ivory Press, 2010, ISBN 978-84-938340-3-6
- Robin Mackay (Editor) (2015) Simulation, Exercise, Operations Falmouth: Urbanomic, 2015, ISBN 978-0-9930458-6-8

== Articles ==
- Alan G. Artner (2008), 'A new medium emerges at resurgent Artropolis', Chicago Tribune, 16 April 2008
- Elizabeth C. Baker (2009), 'John Gerrard', Art in America, 5 April 2009
- Imelda Barnard (2015) 'The View from Earth: John Gerrard at Thomas Dane', Apollo Magazine, 5 March 2015. .
- Paul Bonaventura (2011) 'Profile: John Gerrard', Art Monthly, October 2011
- Shane Brighton (2006) 'Waiting Games: Tragedy, Time and Technology in the work of John Gerrard', in Gerrard 2006
- Charlotte Burns (2015) 'Leonardo DiCaprio plans to give environmental work to Lacma', The Art Newspaper, 9 June 2015
- Nick Compton (2015) '"John Gerrard: Farm" at London's Thomas Dane Gallery explores the unfathomable proportions of modern technology', Wallpaper, 10 February 2015
- Deborah Crane (2011) 'An Explosive Experience', The Times, 16 May 2011
- Sarah Crompton (2011) 'Wayne McGregor, Royal Ballet, Royal Opera House, review', The Telegraph, 17 May 2011
- David Dougill (2011) 'Military Manoeuvres', The Sunday Times: Culture, 22 May 2011
- Nicholas Forrest (2015) 'Interview: John Gerrard on his "Slippery" Sims at Thomas Dane Gallery', Blouin Art Info, 16 February 2015
- Eddy Frankel (2015) 'John Gerrard: Farm', Time Out (London), 20 February 2015
- John Gerrard (2015) 'Remote-Control Site (Interview)', in Mackay (ed) 2015, "When Site Lost the Plot" Falmouth: Urbanomic, 2015, ISBN 978-0-9575295-6-4
- John Gerrard, Michael A. Morris, (2012) 'Corn Bomb: A Short History of Nitrogen', in Collapse vol. 7 Falmouth: Urbanomic, 2012, ISBN 978-0-9567750-9-2
- John Gerrard, Simon Groom, (2011) 'John Gerrard and Simon Groom in Conversation', in Gerrard, Mackay (ed) 2010
- Jenny Gilbert (2011) 'Covent Garden is Blown Away by Sheer Force', The Independent, 22 May 2011
- Blake Gopnik (2009) 'A Most "Animated" Eco-Critique', The Washington Post, 9 June 2009
- Emily Hall (2011) 'John Gerrard, Simon Preston Gallery', ArtForum, February 2011
- Kevin Holmes (2015) 'An Artist and a Helicopter Capture Google's Off-Limits Data Farm', Vice: Creators Project, 13 February 2015
- Luke Jennings (2011) 'Pink chiffon and scorched earth', The Observer, 22 May 2011
- Jonathan Jones (2015), 'Where the internet lives: the artist who snooped on Google's data farm', The Guardian, 4 February 2015
- Adam Kleinman (2015) 'John Gerrard's "Farm", Art Agenda, 18 March 2015
- Robin Mackay (2010), 'Speculative Liter(e)alism', in Gerrard, Mackay (ed) 2010
- Reza Negarestani (2010), 'A History of Surfaces: A Walkthrough', in Gerrard, Mackay (ed) 2010
- Linda Norden, Jasper Sharp, (2009) 'Pause and Continue: A Conversation', in Gerrard 2009
- Christine Paul, (2006), 'The Image Objects of John Gerrard', in Gerrard 2006.
- James Pickford (2015) 'Internet Artist Brings "The Cloud" to Earth', Financial Times, 6 February 2015
- Yoani Sánchez (2010) 'Concrete Forms to Forge a "New Man"', in Gerrard, Mackay (ed) 2010
- Colette Sheridan (2015), 'Walking through the desert to where technology meets art', The Irish Examiner, 10 August 2015
- Roberta Smith (2009) 'John Gerrard', The New York Times, 19 February 2009
- Chelsea Wald (2011), 'Violence blossoms into hyperreal art', New Scientist, 9 July 2011
- Joseph Wolin (2007) 'Introducing: John Gerrard', Modern Painters, November 2007.
- Unattributed (2011) 'Art and Games Cross a Divide at the Manchester International Festival', Manchester Evening News, 24 June 2011.
