= G.I. Stories =

G.I. Stories was a series of 53 booklets published during World War II by the newspaper Stars and Stripes. The series covered the ground, air, and service forces in the European theater of operations.

Each booklet was designed to be small enough to fit in a uniform pocket or to mail home. Booklets were stamped "Passed by censor for mailing home." Inside the covers of most booklets was a page for soldiers to record their personal information, and a page for autographs.

The total pages in each booklet was 40, consisting of 20 double-sided pieces of paper folded in the center and stapled. The pages included 32 text pages, a front and rear cover, and a color centerfold with a map of the divisions route or a photo montage. Eight pages were color including the covers.
