= Robert T. Hastings Jr. =

American public relations professional

Robert T. Hastings Jr. is an American public relations and strategic communications professional who has served as an executive in several aerospace and defense corporations and as a political appointee in the administration of President George W. Bush, where he was the senior public affairs official and principal spokesman for the U.S. Department of Defense in 2008–2009.

Hastings is the Principal for the leadership and communications consultancy, Robert Hastings & Associates, LLC, which works in the aerospace, defense and mobility sectors.

Hastings was appointed Principal Deputy Assistant Secretary of Defense for Public Affairs in March 2008 and subsequently nominated by President Bush to be the Assistant Secretary of Defense for Public Affairs.

Hastings has also held a number of leadership roles in key industry associations and community organizations, including Board of Directors for the Public Relations Society of America (PRSA), the USO of Metropolitan DC, the Armed Services YMCA, National Defense Industrial Association, and the Army Aviation Association of America. He also served as Chairman of the North Texas Commission.

Mr. Hastings has been recognized with a number of awards for his public service including the America’s Future Series LTC James "Maggie" Megellas Award, presented annually to a distinguished military leader who has gone on to demonstrate continued service to the country; the PRSA Lloyd. B. Dennis Distinguished Service Award, given annually to an exemplary professional who has used his or her public affairs skills to promote truth, demonstrated high standards of integrity and honesty in business dealings, and who has helped effect positive change within an organization; and the University of Maryland Distinguished Alumni Award, as well as induction into the Hall of Fame for both the US Army Officer Candidate School and the Defense Information School.

== Military career ==
Hastings enlisted in the U.S. Army in 1978. He was a distinguished graduate of the Warrant Officer Rotary Wing Aviator Course. He piloted the AH-1 Attack Helicopter with the 7th Infantry Division, the 11th Armored Cavalry Regiment and the Army Combat Developments Experimentation Command. Graduating from Officer Candidate School, he was commissioned a 2nd lieutenant in aviation. He served as an Attack Helicopter Platoon leader and Forward Support Platoon leader with the 101st Airborne Division, and as a Reserve Component Aviation advisor at the Fifth U.S. Army headquarters. Hastings completed Armor Officer Advanced Course and returned to the 11th Armored Cavalry Regiment where he served as regimental operations officer, Air Cavalry Troop commander and Assault Helicopter Troop commander. He served as a public affairs officer, Public Affairs Detachment commander with V Corps, and Senior Public Affairs instructor at the Defense Information School before retiring from the U.S. Army. His combat and expeditionary deployments include tours in Iraq, Bosnia and Honduras. His military education includes the Aviation Officer Basic Course, Scout Platoon Leaders Course, Armor Officer Advanced Course, Cavalry Leaders Course, Public Affairs Officer Qualification and Advanced Courses, and Combined Armed and Services Staff School.

Hastings earned the Master Army Aviator, Pathfinder and Air Assault badges. His military awards and decorations include the Defense Meritorious Service Medal, Army Meritorious Service Medal with four oak leaf clusters, Army Commendation Medal, Army Achievement Medal, National Defense Service Medal, Armed Forces Expeditionary Medal, NATO Medal, and Secretary of Defense Staff Identification Badge.

Col. Hastings joined the Texas State Guard in 2010 from the Maryland Defense Force where he served for five years as the Director of Public Affairs. Upon joining the Texas State Guard, Hastings has served as the Chief Public Affairs Officer for the Texas State Guard; commander of the 19th Regiment and the 4th Regiment; and as a brigadier general commanding the 1st Brigade.

Brig. Gen. Robert Hastings, Jr., was officially promoted to the rank of brigadier general in the Texas State Guard during a promotion ceremony held at Camp Mabry, Austin, Texas, July 8, 2018. Texas Governor Greg Abbott signed the promotion order on June 1, 2018. Hastings retired from TXSG on December 31, 2022.

His civilian awards include the Secretary of Defense Distinguished Public Service Medal, the Order of St. George Medallion from the Armor/Cavalry Association, and the Order of St. Michael Medallion from the Army Aviation Association of America.

== Department of Defense Public Affairs ==
Hastings served as principal staff advisor and assistant to Secretary of Defense Robert Gates and Deputy Secretary of Defense Gordon England for strategic communication, public information, internal information, and community relations as well as information training and audiovisual support to DoD activities, leading a worldwide public affairs community of nearly 4000 military and civilian personnel.

During his tenure with The Pentagon, Hastings was a driving force in the development of the Department’s Strategic Communications concept of operations. Working with the Service Public Affairs Chiefs and Combatant Command Public Affairs Directors, he fostered cohesion and partnership among the diverse elements of the Defense public affairs community. He also established the Defense Media Activity, a significant reorganization of DoD Public Affairs which consolidated more than 2000 military and civilian Public Affairs personnel into a single command responsible for the military’s worldwide internal information activities.

Hastings remains active in Defense Public Affairs Policy today as an advisor, counselor and speaker for NATO and numerous US and allied military commands.

== Corporate public relations career ==
Robert Hastings has worked as the senior corporate communications officer at several US aerospace and defense companies to include BAE Systems North America, Northrop Grumman Information Systems and Bell (Formerly Bell Helicopter).

At Bell, Hastings is Executive Vice President, Marketing, Communications & Government Affairs. Mr. Hastings leads all aspects of the company’s global communications programs including government affairs, employee communications, public relations, marketing communications, branding, corporate giving, and community affairs.

Hastings was elected Chairman, North Texas Commission for a term beginning in October 2015.

Hastings is an active member of the Public Relations Society of America (PRSA). He has served on the National Board of Directors, the Board of Ethics and Professional Standards (BEPS), and co-chaired the 2010 International Conference. He is a frequent public speaker and panelist on the subjects of leadership, strategic communications, and media relations.

Additionally, Mr. Hastings serves on the Board of Directors of the USO Metropolitan DC, and the Advisory Council for the University of Florida Master’s program in Global Strategic Communication. He has previously served on the National Board of the Army Aviation Association of America, the Board of the National Defense Industrial Association, and the Washington DC Boards of the Boys & Girls Clubs, the American Cancer Society, and the Juvenile Diabetes Research Foundation.

He is a licensed commercial pilot with a broad range of experience and ratings in both military and civilian aircraft.

He earned a Bachelor of Science degree in government studies from the University of Maryland and has completed executive studies at the Wharton School of Business and the University of Michigan.
