= American Forces Information Service =

The American Forces Information Service (AFIS) was a United States Department of Defense-providing news service that supplied information about the U.S. military.

== History ==
In 1952 the Office of the Secretary of Defense established the Office of Armed Forces Information and Education. In 1977 AFIS was established. AFIS was originally responsible for the Armed Forces Information Program as well as the Armed Forces Radio and Television Service.

Department of Defense Directive 5105.74 disestablished AFIS on October 1, 2008, and created the Defense Media Activity. The DMA provides news stories about military operations worldwide and includes all the military service media centers, Stars and Stripes newspapers as well as the American Forces Radio and Television Service and its American Forces Network (AFN).
