= Max Lederer =

American lawyer and publisher

Max D. Lederer Jr. is an American lawyer who was publisher of Stars and Stripes, a military newspaper, until 2026.

== Career ==
Lederer became Stars and Stripes' publisher in 2007. He was the second full-time civilian to hold the position of publisher.

=== Retirement and firing ===
On August 18, 2026, Lederer announced his retirement as publisher of Stars and Stripes on September 30, 2026, citing disagreements with the leadership of the US Department of Defense. In a memo to staff, Lederer wrote that it has "become clear that my philosophy of leadership, and my understanding of the value and mission of Stars and Stripes, differ in fundamental ways from the direction the leadership of the Department of Defense has for the organization".

On August 21, 2026, CBS News reported Lederer, Stars and Stripes' editor, Erik Slavin, and Middle East correspondent Lara Korte had been terminated for insubordination.
