= Ophelia, Virginia =

Unincorporated community in Virginia, US

Coordinates: 37°54′36″N 76°17′01″W

Ophelia is an unincorporated community in Northumberland County, in the U.S. state of Virginia.
