= Defense Visual Information Distribution Service =

Military media publishing unit of the U.S. Department of Defense

Digital Visual Information Distribution System (DVIDS)
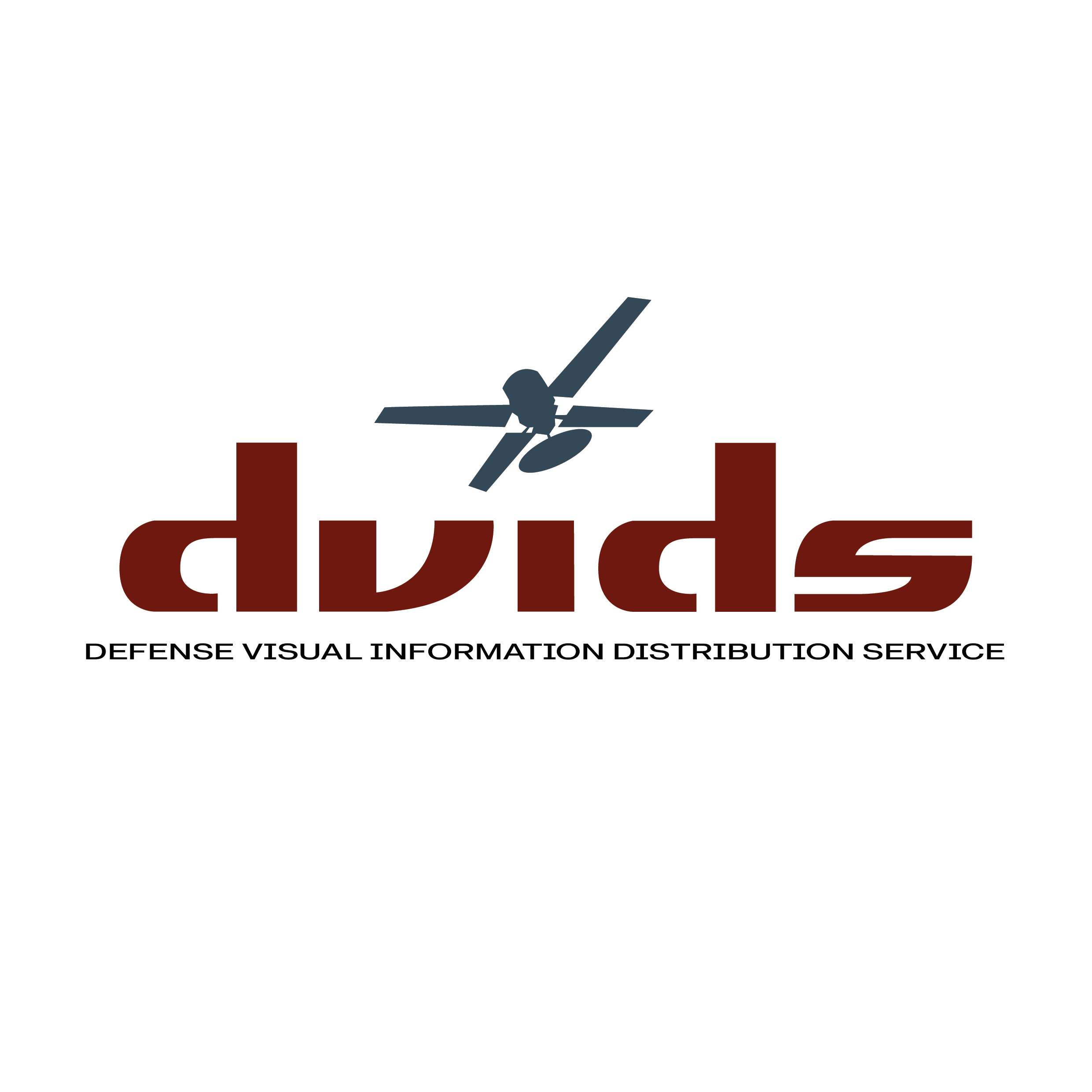
- DVIDS logo
- Active: 22 years
- Country: United States of America
- Branch: War Media Activity
- Type: Multimedia and Information
- Role: Media and public relations
- Part of: US Department of War

Commanders
- DoD DVIDS Program Manager: Scott M Betts

The Digital Visual Information Distribution System (DVIDS), formerly the Defense Video & Imagery Distribution System, is an operation supported by the War Media Activity (DMA). It provides a connection between world media and the American military personnel serving at home and abroad. It supports all branches of the U.S. military and combatant commands worldwide.

== Operations ==
A network of portable Ku-band satellite transmitters and IP video encoders connected to its 24/7 Cloud Network Operations Center, feed DVIDS with PR and combat content, including live video feeds. DVIDS broadcasts videos, photographs, podcasts, audio, webcasts, interviews, and print products (e.g., publications).

The service currently uses cloud computing technologies for infrastructure as a service. It operates WARTV, a military television over the top box app accessed through appletv FireTV, Chromecast or Roku, and offers the Military 24/7 mobile app, which delivers news, video, and photos supplied directly by deployed service members. It maintains the DOW archive for worldwide operations.

Scott M Betts leads the Department of War DVIDS program via War Media Activity, at Fort Meade, Maryland.

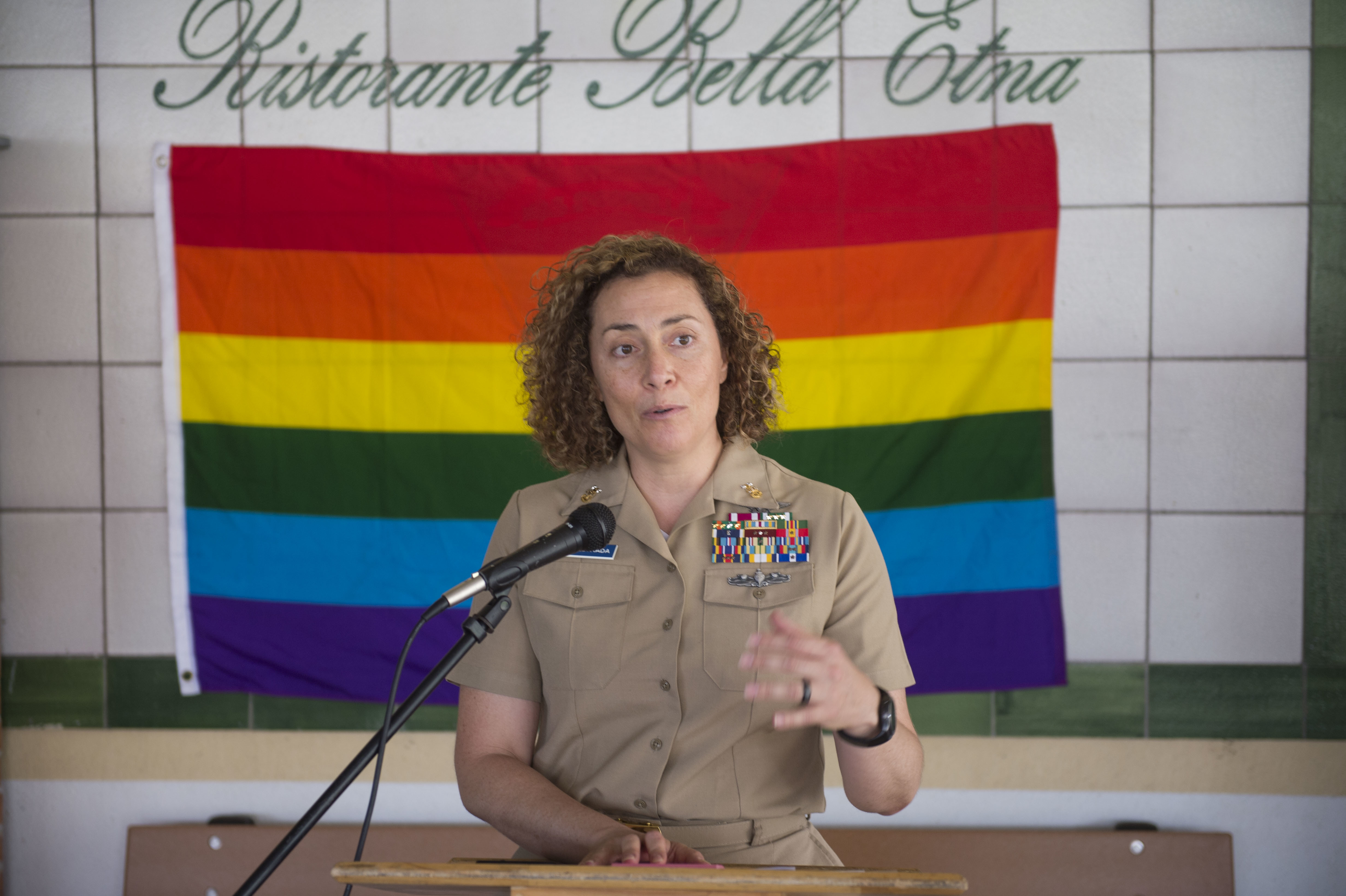
Command Master Chief Nancy Estrada speaking at an LGBT Pride Month celebration, in a photo now removed from the DVIDS website

In 2025, DVIDS took down all "news and feature articles, photos, and videos that promote diversity, equity, and inclusion (DEI)." A previous mass removal was done in 2021 to protect Afghans.

== See also ==
- Public relations
