= Erik Slavin =

American journalist (born c.1970s)

- Occupation: Journalist
- Employer: Stars and Stripes (until August 2026)
- Known for: Editor in chief of Stars and Stripes

Erik Slavin (born ~1970s) is an American journalist. He served as editor in chief of the daily American military newspaper Stars and Stripes until August 2026.

== Education ==
Slavin graduated from the University of Florida with a bachelor's degree in journalism in 1997. He later earned a Master of Arts in Mass Communication from the University of Florida in 2019, completing a graduate program that had begun 22 years earlier.

== Career ==
Slavin served as Europe and Middle East bureau chief for Stars and Stripes for eight years. He was based in Kaiserslautern, Germany.

In September 2025, Slavin was named editor in chief.

On March 9, 2026, the Department of Defense produced a memo that announced "modernization" to Stars and Stripes, demanding the newspaper immediate stop publishing several types of contents, begin implementing the department's new interim policies, and that the publication's content must be "must be consistent with good order and discipline." Slavin criticized the changes, noting they could put reporters who are also members of the US military in legal jeopardy.

=== Firing ===
In August 2026, the Associated Press reported that Slavin had been fired, along with the newspaper's publisher, Max Lederer, and Middle East reporter, Lara Korte. Slavin claimed he was dismissed for insubordination following an interview where he objected to potential censorship by the U.S. military.

His firing received worldwide media attention.

On August 27, 2026, Slavin, Lederer, and Korte sued the Department of Defense in federal court, alleging the Secretary of Defense and the Department "are attempting to fire Plaintiffs for speaking up as private citizens in support of the press’s freedom to cover military operations, its need to reach all servicepersons, and in retaliation for their publication of a news report on deteriorating conditions aboard the U.S.S. Abraham Lincoln during its extended tour of duty in the Mid-East".

On August 28, 2026, following the filing, the three plaintiffs were given a one week reprieve from being fired.
