= Defense Media Activity =

US Department of Defense service

War Media Agency
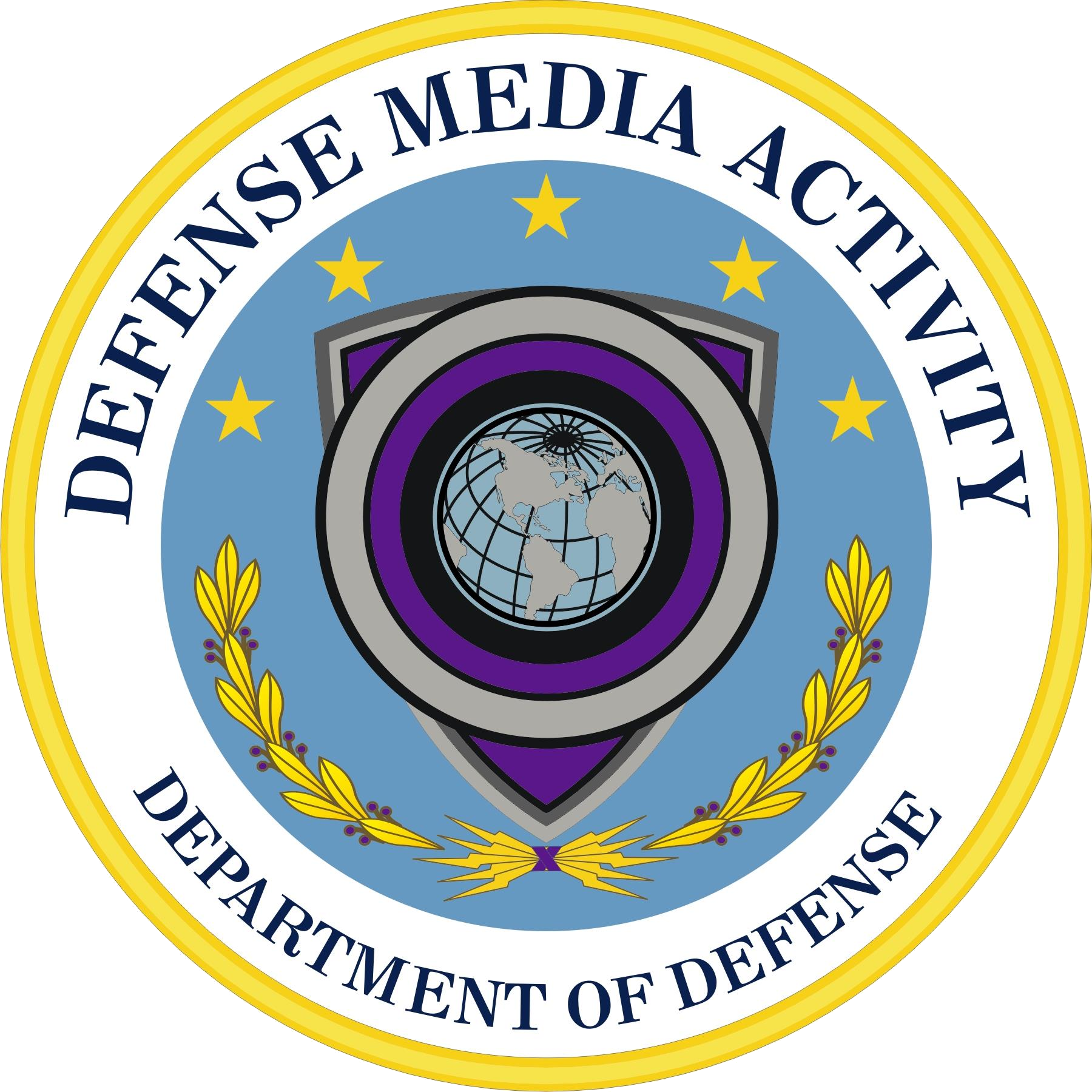
- Old DMA Seal

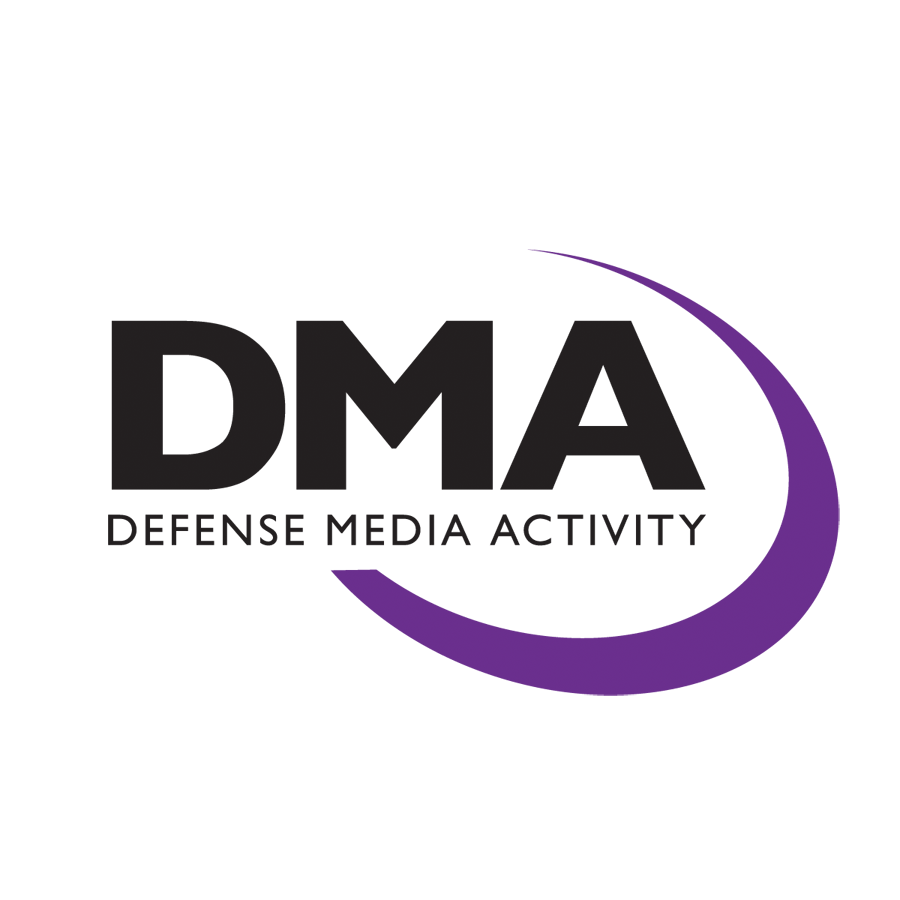
- Old DMA Logo

Agency overview
- Formed: 2008 - present
- Parent department: Independent (2005–2010), US Department of Defense (2010–present)
- Website: www.dma.mil

The Defense Media Activity (DMA) is a field activity of the United States Department of Defense (DoD) since 2008. It provides media and services about the defense department. The Defense Media Activity is located at Fort Meade, Maryland. DoD field activities are established as DoD components by law, by the president, or by the secretary of defense to provide for the performance, on a DoD-wide basis, of a supply or service activity that is common to more than one military department when it is determined to be more effective, economical, or efficient to do so. DMA operates as a separate DoD Component under the authority, direction and control of the assistant to the secretary of defense for public affairs. On 6 May 2026, the DoD officially renamed the organization the "War Media Activity", later updated to "War Media Agency" on October 14, 2026.

== History ==
The Defense Media Activity can trace its organizational lineage to the first publication of the Stars and Stripes newspaper produced by Union soldiers during the Civil War in 1861. It also traces its lineage to the Armed Forces Network (AFN) radio first broadcast in London in July 1943 with borrowed equipment. In the early 1970s, AFN took over Air Force Television in Ramstein, Germany and became AFRTS. Beginning in 1980, the Army Broadcasting Service (ABS) took over managing Armed Forces Radio and Television Service (AFRTS) providing radio and television in Europe, Korea, Honduras and the Marshall Islands until 2005. In November 2006, The Army Soldiers Media Center (SMC) was created and took control of AFRTS,Soldier's Magazine, and other army related media.

=== Base Realignment and Closure 2005 ===
In 2005, as part of the Base Realignment and Closure 2005 analysis, the Defense Department recommended consolidating the media-related organizations of the Military Departments into a single organization and co-locating it with the American Forces Information Service (an existing DoD field activity). The Defense Base Realignment and Closure (BRAC) Commission accepted the DoD recommendation and included the recommendation in its report to the president. On 8 September 2005, the president approved the BRAC Commission recommendations and forwarded them to the United States Congress. On 20 September 2005, the U.S. Congress failed to disapprove of the BRAC Commission's recommendations. Under the provisions of the Defense Base Realignment and Closure Act of 1990 (Public Law 101–510), the recommendations were effectively "approved".

The approved BRAC actions were to:

- Realign Fort Belvoir, Virginia, by relocating Soldiers Magazine to Fort Meade, Maryland.
- Realign Anacostia Annex, District of Columbia, by relocating the Naval Media Center to Fort Meade, Maryland.
- Realign 2320 Mill Road, a leased installation in Alexandria, Virginia, by relocating Army Broadcasting-Soldier Radio/TV to Fort Meade, Maryland.
- Realign 103 Norton Street, a leased installation in San Antonio, Texas by relocating the Air Force News Agency and the Joint Hometown News Service to Fort Meade, Maryland.
- Close 601 North Fairfax Street, a leased installation in Alexandria, Virginia, by relocating the American Forces Information Service and the Army Broadcasting-Soldier Radio/TV to Fort Meade, Maryland.
- Consolidate Soldier Magazine, Naval Media Center, Army Broadcasting-Soldier Radio/TV, the Soldier's Media Center and the Air Force News Agency-Army/Air Force Hometown News Service into a single DoD Media Activity at Fort Meade, Maryland.

=== Establishment ===
In September 2007, the deputy defense secretary recognized that the BRAC 2005 decision would result in two field activities co-located at Fort Meade – the American Forces Information Service and DMA – and directed several actions.

- Consolidate the American Forces Information Service with DMA.
- Include the internal media elements of the U.S. Marine Corps that were not addressed in the BRAC 2005 decision.
- Establish DMA on 1 January 2008.
- Transfer the funds and people from the legacy organizations to DMA on 1 October 2009.

DMA's chartering directive, DoD Directive 5105.74, Defense Media Activity, was published on 18 December 2007.

DMA was formally established on 1 January 2008, and the people and funding from the predecessor organizations were transferred to DMA on 1 October 2008. The elements required to move to Fort Meade by the BRAC 2005 decision remained in their facilities as their facility at Fort Meade was designed and constructed. The building design was completed in September 2008.

On 13 March 2009, the U.S. Army Corps of Engineers, Baltimore District, awarded a $56,195,000 contract to Hensel Phelps Construction Co. of Chantilly, Virginia, to construct DMA's headquarters and media production center in Fort Meade, Maryland. The 185,870 square-foot facility was built to house approximately 660 personnel and was completed in May 2011. The move was completed in August 2011. DMA elements located in the Pentagon, Washington, D.C., Tobyhanna Army Depot, Riverside, California, and all overseas locations remained in place.

== Organization and functions ==
Organization and Functions DMA is composed of a headquarters and five Lines of Business (LoB).

The Defense Information School provides joint-service training to defense, military and civilian personnel in the career fields of Public Affairs and Visual Information at Fort Meade, Maryland.

Media Production produces media and visual information products to the DoD and outside agencies through media, including motion and still imagery; print; radio; television; internet, mobile, and other communication technologies. The American Forces Network (AFN), provides U.S. radio and television news, information, and entertainment programming. It includes radio and television stations in military communities in Europe, the Pacific and the Middle East; and includes its central broadcasting hub, the AFN Broadcast Center at March Air Reserve Base in Riverside, California. Other services of Media Production include Defense Visual Information Distribution Service (DVIDS) and providing internal news and information for Defense.gov, Army.mil, Navy.mil, Marines.mil, and AF.mil.

The Stars and Stripes produces and delivers a newspaper overseas (and online) for U.S. military communities outside of the United States. It provides U.S. and world news and staff-produced stories to military communities and garrisons.

Mission Support provides administration, facility management, transportation and logistics services.

Web Enterprise Business (WEB.mil) provides technology services to DMA, hosts DoD websites through the DoD Public Web program, Defense Visual Information Distribution Service (DVIDS), and the Television-Audio Support Activity (T-ASA).

== Directors ==
DMA is led by a director appointed by the assistant to the secretary of defense (public affairs) and may be a military flag or general officer, or a civilian appointed as a career member of the Senior Executive Service.

- 2024 to present Col. Richard McNorton, acting director of War Media Activity
- January 28, 2021 to 2024, Harold "Hal" E. Pittman
- November 1, 2018, to January 28, 2021, (acting director) COL Paul R. Haverstick, Jr.
- February 1, 2018, to November 1, 2018, (acting director) COL Bernard Koelsch
- February 11, 2013, to February 1, 2018, Ray B. Shepherd
- May 1, 2012 – February 10, 2013, (acting director) Bryan G. Whitman, Principal Deputy Assistant Secretary of Defense for Public Affairs
- October 14, 2009 – April 30, 2012, (acting director), Melvin W. Russell, Director, American Forces Radio and Television Service, DMA
- March 29, 2009 – October 13, 2009, David S. Jackson
- March 10, 2008 – March 28, 2009, (acting director) Robert T. Hastings, Jr., Principal Deputy Assistant Secretary of Defense for Public Affairs
- January 1, 2008 – March 9, 2008, (acting director) Bryan G. Whitman, Deputy Assistant Secretary of Defense for Media Operations
