= Command information newspaper =

Unofficial written publication funded by the US DoD

A command information newspaper is any unofficial written publication directly funded by the United States Department of Defense. Editorial views expressed in command information newspapers may not necessarily be those of the United States government, or the Department of Defense.

Since October 2008, the Defense Department has changed the way information is distributed to service members and their families, unifying the publication of command information newspapers with command information websites.

== History ==
According to the Doctrine for Public Affairs in Joint Operations (1997), it is the responsibility of combatant commanders to conduct command information programs, including "resourcing" locally produced command information newspapers, to disseminate information to forces deployed in an operational area.

The 101st Airborne Division of the United States Army has produced its own command information news publications during at least three wars. During World War II, it produced a news magazine called Screaming Eagle, which first appeared in print on September 17, 1945. In 1968, during the Vietnam War, it published a quarterly magazine called Rendezvous With Destiny. In 1990, during Operation Desert Shield, its Public Affairs Office published another command information newspaper called Screaming Eagle, as well as video news segments. Production of the newspaper during Desert Shield was kept simple, with pages typed on laptops, printed out with photographs glued on, and photocopied.

During the Vietnam War, the Military Assistance Command, Vietnam, (MACV) under General William C. Westmoreland published a command information newspaper called the Observer. According to former military journalist Les Payne, 80,000 copies of the Observer were dumped in the South China Sea due to a printing error. The error was blamed on the printer in Tokyo, who had somehow replaced "VN" for "Vietnamese" with "VC" for "Viet Cong", in a headline about a new agricultural bank.

An example of a domestically produced command information newspaper in the United States is The Andrew Vindicator, first published by the Joint Task Force (JTF) Andrew Public Affairs Office on September 16, 1992, in the response to Hurricane Andrew.
