= Dust Storm (Manter, Kansas) =

Coordinates: 53.3400°N 6.2997°W

- Artist: John Gerrard
- Year: 2008
- Type: 3D video environmental art
- Location: Irish Museum of Modern Art; Dublin

Dust Storm (Manter, Kansas) is a 3D digital simulation work of art, by John Gerrard.

== History ==
In 2008, the Dust Storm was shown at Artropolis, Chicago. In 2011, it was shown at PICA, Perth, Australia, Ivorypress, Madrid, Spain, and Irish Museum of Modern Art.

== Analysis ==
The 3D "hyperreal" portraits depict beautiful landscapes.

Dust Storm unites a classic image from the Great Depression with a contemporary industrial landscape, setting them in a cosmological orbit that is completed over the full spectrum of a year. The exploitation of oil that goes back to the beginning of the 20th Century is presented as the catalyst of conditions that led to the ecological disaster of the Dust Bowl. But nothing is didactic. The pity in the subject comes to viewers subliminally through a visual poem of complexity and power.
