= Slapping (strike) =

Striking a face with an open hand

Man being slapped

Slapping or smacking is striking a person with the open palm of the hand, in a movement known as a slap or smack. A backhand uses the back of the hand instead of the palm.

== Etymology and definitions ==
The word slap was first recorded in 1632, probably as a form of onomatopoeia. It shares its beginning consonants with several other English words related to violence, such as "slash", "slay", and "slam". The word is found in several English colloquialisms, such as, "slap fight", "slap-happy", "slapshot", "slapstick", "slap on the wrist" (as a mild punishment), "slap in the face" (as an insult or, alternatively, as a reproof against a lewd or insulting comment), and "slap on the back" (an expression of friendship or congratulations).

=== In music ===
In jazz and other styles of music, the term refers to the action of pulling an instrument's strings back and allowing them to smack the instrument.

=== Bitch slap ===
"Bitch slap" is a slang phrase that dates to the 1990s. It means to slap someone to express dominance, contempt, or disrespect.

=== Happy slapping ===
For about five years beginning in 2004, happy slapping became a UK fad. Happy slapping is the phenomenon whereby kids assault someone while being recorded by a friend on their mobile phone; afterwards the video is uploaded to a site like YouTube. Media coverage of the alleged trend led to a nationwide moral panic, including a call by one member of parliament for schools to block mobile phone signals.

== Usage and meaning ==
The purpose of a slap is often to humiliate, more than injure. A "slap in the face" is a common idiom, dating back to the late 1800s, that means to rebuke, rebuff or insult.

In his 2004 text The Naked Woman: A Study of the Female Body, anthropologist Desmond Morris defines what he calls the "cheek slap," which he describes as "the classic action of a lady responding to the unwelcome attentions of a male." Morris categorizes the cheek slap as a "display blow", meaning one that is impossible to ignore but doesn't cause much damage.

The word "slap" is frequently used to minimize the perceived violence of an act, even if the act was especially severe. One person may hit another across the face and injure them severely, but in calling it a slap, it may seem less severe, since slapping is often associated with minor violence.

== Cultural aspects ==
Minnie Mouse slaps Mickey Mouse in Plane Crazy, an example of slapping as depicted in popular media.

Slapping is viewed differently by different cultures. In many countries, such as Iceland, slapping a child is viewed as a form of physical abuse, and is illegal (see corporal punishment of children), whereas in others, such as England, it is seen by only some parents as abusive, and even then only moderately so. The slapping of children in England and Northern Ireland remains legal as of 2023, despite being illegal in the two other UK constituent countries of Scotland (since 2020) and Wales (since 2022).

In some cultures, when girls menstruate for the first time, their mothers often slap them across the face, a cultural tradition thought by some to signify the difficulties of life as a woman.

Studies have shown that although Americans frown upon domestic violence regardless of whether the perpetrator is male or female, generally they are more accepting of minor violence, such as slapping, when it is perpetrated by a woman against a man or vice versa. Women who inflict minor acts of violence on their male partners have a higher-than-normal probability of being severely assaulted by those partners, and domestic violence experts therefore advise at-risk women to refrain from even minor acts of physical aggression against their partners. It has been suggested by Michael Lamb that both men and women who are violent toward their spouses are more likely to be so with their children as well.

In India, the "insult slap" is a political maneuver used to express disapproval of ideas of a particular public figure or politician.

Slapping is very often portrayed in films and television programs. For example, in Slap Her... She's French girls and women typically slap boys, men and other females who offend them in some way and humiliate them.

=== As a combat sport ===
In the 2020s, slapping contests began to gain popularity and attention as a combat sport via viral videos; opponents stand across from each other and exchange blows until one concedes or is knocked out.

In 2023, UFC president Dana White attempted to popularize slapping contests via his promotion Power Slap, which also received sanctioning from the Nevada State Athletic Commission with rules patterned upon those of mixed martial arts. The series Power Slap: Road to the Title, which had also been delayed after White was filmed slapping his wife at a New Year's party, faced poor viewership and was cancelled by TBS after one season. However, White's promotion continues to produce shows throughout the year.

In February 2025 a slap fighting contest was to take place at the Glasgow University Union, Scotland, as part of a weight-lifting evening; it would have been the first slap fighting event in Scotland. It was cancelled after advice from one of the university's neuroscience researchers that it could lead to brain damage. Dr Willie Stewart urged the organisers not to "encourag[e] people to risk their brain health in the name of 'sport'".

Polish strongman Artur Walczak died in 2021 after taking part in a slap fighting contest. In 2024, researchers at the University of Pittsburgh investigated the links between slap fighting and brain injury using video analysis and concluded that:

more than half of the slap sequences resulted in participants exhibiting visible signs of concussion. By the end of their matches, nearly 40% of sequences resulted in signs of poor motor coordination, about a third of the sequences resulted in participants having a blank and vacant look, and a quarter of the sequences featured participants who were slow to get up after being brought down by a blow. Nearly 80% of the fighters demonstrated a visible sign of concussion at least once in the series of matches.

== Slapping incidents ==
=== History ===
- In 1884, Czech actress Maria Pospischil slapped the director of the National Theatre in Prague, František Šubert, who had made indecent advances toward her in exchange for casting opportunities. As a result of this incident, Pospischil was forced to leave for Germany and begin a career in German theatre.
- In the early 1930s, Russian poet Osip Mandelstam publicly slapped Alexey Tolstoy, a prominent Soviet writer and loyal Bolshevik supporter, over unpaid debts and perceived insults to his wife. The incident played a role in Mandelstam's arrest and eventual exile to Siberia, where he later died.
- In 1943, while touring an evacuation hospital during WWII, U.S. Lieutenant General George S. Patton slapped two soldiers who were hospitalized with no visible physical injuries.
- In 1989, Hungarian-American socialite and actress Zsa Zsa Gabor was convicted for slapping a Beverly Hills police officer when he stopped her for a traffic violation.
- In 1997, Anastasia Athini slapped Dimitra Liani-Papandreou, the widow of former Greek Prime Minister Andreas Papandreou, during the launch of Liani's memoir. Athini, a Ministry of Finance employee at the time, claimed she was provoked by Liani's behavior and lifestyle, which she felt insulted the Greek people.
- In 2005, the "happy slapping" trend emerged, involving individuals recording assaults to share online. This phenomenon escalated to severe violence, including the fatal attack on David Morley in October 2004.
- In 2017, Palestinian teenager Ahed Tamimi slapped an Israeli soldier during a confrontation in the West Bank. The incident, captured on video, became a symbol of resistance and sparked international debate about the Israeli-Palestinian conflict.
- In 2021, French President Emmanuel Macron was slapped in the face by a man while greeting the public during a visit to southeastern France. The attacker was sentenced to four months in prison.
- In 2022, at the 94th Academy Awards, actor Will Smith slapped Chris Rock on-stage in response to a joke directed towards his wife Jada Pinkett Smith.
- In 2024, Chinese therapist Xiao Hongchi, an exponent of the "paida lajin" method, which sees patients being slapped or slapping themselves repeatedly, was jailed for 15 years at Winchester Crown Court, after a jury found him guilty of the manslaughter of Danielle Carr-Gomm. The victim, aged 71, had Type 1 diabetes and fell fatally ill after she stopped taking her insulin and fasted during one of his paida lajin therapy retreats.
- In 2025, Georgian journalist Mzia Amaglobeli was arrested after slapping the Batumi police chief during protests against the Georgian Dream government. She faces up to seven years in prison for assault, a charge widely seen as politically motivated. Amaglobeli went on a hunger strike, drawing international attention and condemnation.

== See also ==
- Battery (crime)
- Bullying
- Child abuse
- Corporal punishment in the home
- The Slap, 2008 novel
