= The Human Animal (TV series) =

British nature documentary series by Desmond Morris (1994)

- UK VHS cover
- Genre: Nature documentary
- Presented by: Desmond Morris
- Music by: The Vanbrugh Quartet with Louise Hopkins
- Composers: Howard Blake; Guy Michelmore
- Country of origin: United Kingdom
- Original language: English
- No. of episodes: 6

Production
- Executive producers: Steve Burns; Bill Cosmas; Mike Beynon
- Producers: Martin Weitz; Clive Bromhall; Vanessa Berlowitz; John Macnish; Mike Beynon
- Editors: Andrew Mort; Stuart Napier; Tim Coope; Christine Sculfor; Alan Hoida; Quentin Wainwright
- Running time: 50 minutes
- Production companies: BBC Natural History Unit (United Kingdom); Discovery Communications (United States); ORF (Austria); MDR/SFB/WDR (Germany); Teleac (Netherlands)

Original release
- Network: BBC One
- Release: 27 July – 31 August 1994

The Human Animal: A Personal View of the Human Species is a British nature documentary series written and presented by English zoologist Desmond Morris, first transmitted on BBC One in the United Kingdom from 27 July to 31 August 1994. It was co-produced in association with Discovery Communications (later Warner Bros. Discovery) in the United States, as well as several public broadcasters include: ORF in Austria, various ARD networks (MDR, SFB and WDR) in Germany, and Teleac in the Netherlands.

The series was later repeated on BBC Knowledge between 29 November 2000 and 31 January 2002 – with the exception of its controversial fourth episode due to various erotic scenes with sexually explicit material.

== Premise ==
The programme has been written to accompany its six-part television series made by the BBC's Natural History Unit in Bristol, owing a debt of gratitude to all members of the large team that made their enthusiasm for this project unflagging within the immense care and effort they took to recording various patterns of human behaviour all over the globe was ultimately inspiring.

It described as "a study of human behaviour from a zoological perspective", he travels the world to filming the diverse customs and habits of various regions while suggesting common roots. The series which took two years (between 1992 and 1993) to make, this time will be a fascinating controversial moment especially the filming of orgasm shots from inside a woman's body, standing upright on our human sexuality and the simple anatomical fact as Morris commented:

Nothing was faked, although it was done under very special circumstances. We had a television camera inside the vagina. I'm not trying to be sensational. If you tell the truth about sex, you get into trouble.

More than the mere fascination of finding out particularly in a cultural moment, making it easier to see those of other cultures, faiths, political beliefs or sexual orientation as so distinctly from us that we shared humanity, examining a different biological component of our behaviours and ways of being – a timeless reminder that shared far more than we think.

At the close of its first episode, Morris described through as it follows:

I've sometimes been accused of degrading mankind, of insulting human dignity, of making man beastly. This surprised me because I like animals, and I feel proud to call myself one. I've never looked down upon them, so to call human beings animals is not, to me, degrading. It's simply being honest: putting us in our place as part of the scheme of nature on the planet Earth.

== Background ==
Morris studies the natural habitat within its most interesting and odd species of all – humans, as we have evolved from our ancestors, instincts and behaviour are still rooted in our animal past. By denying this inheritance we are in danger of destroying everything we have strived so hard to create, as well as the different skin colours, beliefs and rituals to be found in the 5,000 million human beings alive today, we actually all share an almost identical genetic heritage.

In this portrait of the human species, Morris takes us right to the centre of existence exploring all aspects between life and behaviour from the way we our young to the common use of certain facial gestures, and covers a fascinating variety of subjects – our hunting instincts have been channelled into an extraordinary range of sporting activities; how the modern art world can trace its roots back to an early primate picking up a stone that resembles a face; how different courtship rituals across the world reflect the universal emotion of love. Morris also looks at some of the damaging consequences that can be seen when we try to deny our animal heritage – how territorial fights erupt when the tribal systems within our overcrowded cities break down, and how human relationships disintegrate when natural social or sexual patterns may change.

In this final episode, the last remaining lines which focused about dealing with various aspects of human behaviour when Morris said:

Of all the millions of species that have ever lived, we the human animal, are by far the most extraordinary. We're the magic combination, the threshold leaper, the risk-taker, the venerable child for all occasions.

== Controversy ==
The most controversial moment in the series takes place in the fourth episode, which was originally transmitted on 17 August 1994. It includes sexually explicit scenes of a couple making love by using tiny endoscopic cameras placed inside to show intimate orifices located over the naked body, as well as several shots of full-frontal nudity by using thermal imagery to stimulate their sexual positions. The programme also depicts the insertion of a man's erect penis into a woman's vagina culminating in an orgasm and the ejaculation of semen. The depiction is followed by a microscopic view of human fertilization, helping to explain the defensive behaviours of the ovum to prevent multiple sperm cells from fertilizing it. For the first time, the programme actually showed artificial insemination, highlighting how these mechanisms work in a controlled environment.

The naked actors and married couple became famously known for their appearances in the 1991 sexually explicit educational video The Lovers' Guide. 31-year-old Wendy Duffield from London compounded the controversy further when she told a newspaper said "the only thing that wasn't faked was the orgasm". She made love with her husband, 38-year-old Tony, taking three times a day that required 63 sessions of strenuous effort by the couple over a period of three consecutive weeks in front of a film crew in order to show the physiological processes at work in sexual intercourse. Many scenes were also added later by using "tricks" to fool the viewers. Despite sufficient warnings being also given to the public, many complaints arose about this episode which was watched by an audience of more than 12 million viewers during the post-watershed slot; the BBC eventually described the production as a normal standard practice in documentary film-making.

The controversial fourth episode was initially shown on several television networks in different countries, including ABC National TV in Australia on 29 September 1994 and The Learning Channel in the United States on 22 January 1995. It was not previously broadcast on the digital educational channel BBC Knowledge (between December 2000 and January 2002) due to various scenes of sexually explicit material containing intimate moments of a couple during orgasm were too offensive for many viewers.

== Episodes ==
No.	Title	Original release date
1	"The Language of the Body"	27 July 1994
In this first episode, Morris takes us through around the world tour of cultural body language differences with a repertoire of 3,000 gestures and facial expressions, emphasizing the well known awkward situations they can produce for those unaware finds that beyond the superficial effective there are biological similarities turned out to be virtually universal, a product of our evolutionary history as much so that we share many of them with our closest cousins – chimpanzees.
2	"The Hunting Ape"	3 August 1994
The episode continues as Morris traces back our ancestry from arboreal gatherers to bipedal hunters, whether learn so many of the eating habits we take for granted simply aesthetic as non-functional even separated from feeding to reveal the instincts that our ancestors acquired long ago due to powerful evolutionary selection pressures, and the implications of many of those adaptations in our modern world.
3	"The Human Zoo"	10 August 1994
The third part of this episode explores the evolutionary and psychological implications of modern city living, a kind of natural environment to which our genes have not yet had time to adapt. Despite seemingly vast cultural differences when Morris reveals a very odd species replete with several arbitrary beliefs, rituals and traditions that work as mechanisms of social cohesion and group identity.
4	"The Biology of Love"	17 August 1994
This fascinating controversial episode examines the profound impact of human sexuality analyzes how the attendant patterns of behaviour, within the signals between health and fertility have evolved to ensure genetic survival and pair-bonding for their romantic quests. Morris described the pubescent periods of maturation, stages of courtship and aesthetics of physical beauty were studied, along with the anatomical mechanics of sexual arousal and copulation. The intimate moments of love making to illustrate the intense physiological changes take place during reproduction and fertilization, as well as the stresses placed on couples which affect all lives in an urban crowded world are explored.
5	"The Immortal Genes"	24 August 1994
The penultimate episode looks at biological basis about natural history to inspect our life cycle of the human parent and a child looking for reasons why we devote more time than any other species to raising our offspring, and reveals offer a way of overcoming death itself as average humans now live for 20 years after their breeding capabilities are over. Morris travels to the Mexican Festival of the Dead and into the depths of an Etruscan tomb to find out the answer.
6	"Beyond Survival"	31 August 1994
The final episode of this series addresses the question we have all been asking ourselves since why do things like art, music, literature and philosophy. Morris concludes by exploring the deepest humans – what we do become once have our basic needs for food, warmth and shelter, as well as various concepts like creativity, artistic progression and symbolic thinking to demonstrate how aesthetic decisions are being made every day by people across the world, undoubtedly their insatiable playfulness that make us "superbly".

== Music ==
The programme's title music were composed by Howard Blake and Guy Michelmore, which includes the opening rendition of Franz Schubert's "String Quintet in C major, D. 956" (from the turbulent section of Adagio used as the sublime second movement) was one of its haunting orchestral themes ever written also arranged by Irish classical music group The Vanbrugh Quartet with English cellist Louise Hopkins.

== Crew ==
BBC Natural History Unit

- Tony Allen – camera operator
- Ali Asad – camera operator
- Alan Barker – sound recordist
- Justin Barlow – sound recordist
- Carol Beckwith – director (Maasai sequences)
- Geoff Bell – camera operator
- Vanessa Berlowitz – researcher/producer
- Tim Bevan – dubbing editor
- Mike Beynon – series producer
- Melissa Blandford – production secretary
- Mike Boland – camera operator
- Paul Bond – graphic designer
- Graham Booth – assistant producer
- Steve Bourne – sound recordist
- Amy Bower – camera operator
- Matt Briggs – post-production assistant
- Clive Bromhall – assistant producer
- Derek Bromhall – camera operator
- Neil Bromhall – camera operator
- Robert Brownhill – camera operator
- Cian de Buitlear – camera operator
- James Cawte – video effects
- Paul Cheary – camera operator
- Barry Cook – lighting
- Tim Coope – editor
- John Couzens – camera operator
- Twydor Davies – post-production assistant
- Louise Dawe-Lane – production secretary
- Tina DiFeliciantonio – camera operator
- John Dumont – sound recordist
- Rolf Eisbrenner – sound recordist
- John Forsyte – camera operator
- Richard Ganniclifft – camera operator
- Ray Gibbons – camera operator
- Jeff Goodman – camera operator
- David Graham-Baker – stills photographer
- Rawn Hairston – camera operator
- Martyn Harries – dubbing mixer
- Doug Hartington – camera operator
- Alan Heyward – camera operator
- Peter Hicks – dubbing mixer
- Alan Hoida – editor
- Mike Hughes – camera operator
- Eric Huyton – camera operator
- Robin Johnson – lighting
- Mark Johnston – director (Maasai sequences)
- Mike Lemmon – camera operator
- Andy Long – lighting
- John Macnish – assistant producer
- Bill Megalos – camera operator
- Kevin Meredith – sound recordist
- Howie Meyer – lighting
- Mark Molesworth – camera operator
- Patrick Morrison – camera operator
- Andrew Mort – editor
- Patti Musicaro – camera operator
- Stuart Napier – editor
- Belinda Parsons – camera operator
- Mark Payne-Gill – camera operator
- Bob Perrin – camera operator
- Lisa Pinero – sound recordist
- Michael Pitts – camera operator
- John Podpadec – camera operator
- Jeremy Pollard – camera operator
- Elmer Postle – camera operator
- Rick Price – camera operator
- Raihul Ranavive – camera operator
- Saskia van Rees – camera operator
- Robin Risely – camera operator
- William Roberts – sound recordist
- John Rodda – sound recordist
- Mizoslav Roussimov – camera operator
- Jenni Russell – film research
- Tom Russell – camera operator
- Ian Salvage – camera operator
- David Scott – camera operator
- Christine Sculfor – editor
- Susannah Shaw – camera operator
- Penny Smith – researcher
- Nicky Spode – unit manager
- Liz Stevens – production assistant
- Sue Tiplady – film researcher
- Claudio Tondi – camera operator
- Keith Turner – camera operator
- Richard Varner – camera operator
- Quentin Wainwright – editor
- John Waters – camera operator
- Jonathan Watts – camera operator
- Bob Webber – sound recordist
- Martin Weitz – producer
- Jayne Wilde-Macnish – film research
- Marianne Wilding – camera operator
- Di Williams – production assistant
- Jeff Wood – sound recordist
- Bill Wren – sound recordist
- Alekos Yiannaros – camera operator

Discovery Communications

- Patricia Allebach – assistant editor
- Steve Burns – executive producer
- Bill Cosmas – executive producer
- Jef Huey – online editor
- Jenifer Millstone – avid editor
- Ann Victoria Pararas – online producer

ORF

- Victor Couzyn – voiceover
- Walter Köhler – editor
- Christian Kubo – editor
- Gottfried Moser – dubbing mixer
- Alfred Payrleitner – editor
- Alexander Rossi – voiceover

MDR/SFB/WDR

- Immanuel Birmelin – co-operator
- Dieter Kaiser – editor
- Gudrun Szilagyi – editor
- Josef Tratnik – voiceover
- Gerd Weiss – film producer

Teleac

- Monique Alkemade – editor
- Aad Bos – voiceover

== Availability ==
The accompanying 244-page book of the television series published by BBC Books on 21 July 1994, and also a large-print version of the book (with 256 pages) was published by ISIS in January 1995. The book is also available in several different countries include: Australia, Finland, Italy, United States, Germany, the Netherlands, Portugal, Denmark, Israel, Czech Republic, Hungary, Poland, Turkey, China and Spain.

It was also available as a VHS format of the programme released by BBC Video on 3 April 1995, containing six episodes in a dual cassette edition with the running time of 293 minutes.
