= John Macnish =

British television producer and director

John Macnish is a British television producer and self shooting director.

== Television career ==
After working as a lecturer at the BBC's Engineering Training Department and before moving into mainstream TV production at the studios at Pebble Mill in Birmingham, he was studio director on the live lunchtime light entertainment show Daytime Live and also directed The Chelsea Flower Show, Top Gear and Scene Today. Between 1992 and 1994, Macnish produced the BBC series The Human Animal written and presented by zoologist Desmond Morris. In 1996, he produced Salmon Against the Tides presented by David Attenborough in a co-production between the BBC and Discovery US.

In 1991, Macnish set up Circlevision Productions in partnership with his wife Jayne. The company went on to produce commercial productions and broadcast series including the BBC space science series Final Frontier and the observational documentary series following the Beagle 2 project to look for life on Mars led by Colin Pillinger.
