= Dana White =

American businessman (born 1969)

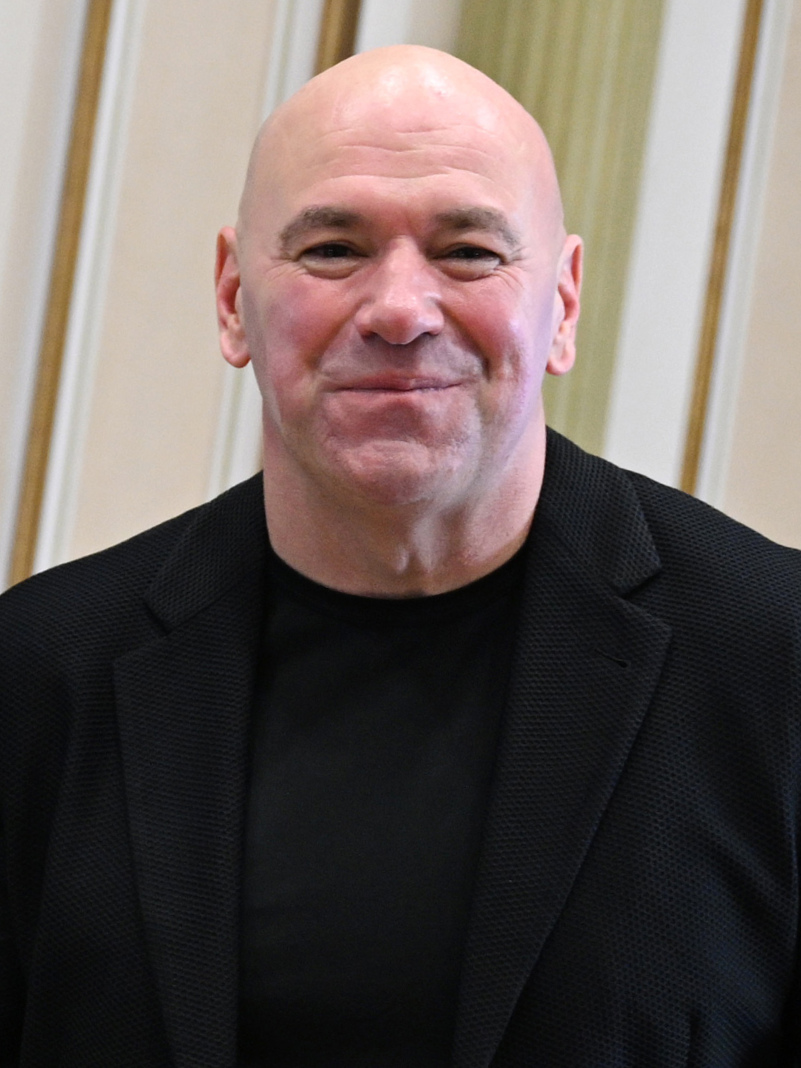
- White in 2025
- Born: Dana Frederick White Jr. July 28, 1969 (age 57); Manchester, Connecticut, U.S.
- Education: Quincy College (dropped out); University of Massachusetts, Boston (dropped out)
- Occupation: Businessman
- Known for: President and CEO of Ultimate Fighting Championship (UFC)
- Political party: Republican
- Spouse: Anne Stella (m. 1996)
- Children: 3

Dana Frederick White Jr. (born July 28, 1969) is an American businessman who is the president and chief executive officer (CEO) of the Ultimate Fighting Championship (UFC), a global mixed martial arts organization. In 2025, White's net worth was estimated at over $600 million by Forbes.

Originally a manager for UFC fighters, White notified his friends, Frank and Lorenzo Fertitta, about the opportunity to purchase the UFC. The Fertittas bought the promotion for $2 million in 2001 and appointed White as its president. As an attempt to popularize the brand and the sport, White co-created The Ultimate Fighter, a reality television series, in 2004. The series was successful and led to growth for the UFC. White and the Fertittas continued to lead the UFC until 2016, when it was sold for $4 billion to a consortium led by WME-IMG. White remained president after the sale and was named CEO of the company in 2023 following a reorganization of the ownership structure into TKO Group Holdings.

Outside of the UFC, White runs Power Slap, a slap fighting promotion he founded in 2022. Meta Platforms elected White to its board of directors in 2025. Also in 2025, White co-founded Zuffa Boxing, a professional boxing organization of which he serves as promoter.

== Early life and education ==
White was born in Manchester, Connecticut, to June and Dana White Sr. on July 28, 1969. He is an Irish American. White spent many of his early years residing in Ware, Massachusetts.

White and his sister, Kelly, were raised by their mother and her family for the majority of their childhoods. White's mother was a nurse, and the family moved to Las Vegas when White was in third grade, as Vegas offered higher wages for nurses. White attended Bishop Gorman High School, where he first met Lorenzo Fertitta, although they did not become close friends until years later. White said he disliked school and "got kicked out of Gorman twice". Despite living in Nevada, the Whites returned to the East Coast in the summers, to spend time with White's grandparents in Levant, Maine, a small town near Bangor. White spent his senior year of high school in Maine.

After graduating from Hermon High School in 1987, White started college twice, once at Quincy College and once at UMass Boston, but dropped out during his first semester each time. During this time, he had various jobs, such as laying asphalt, working as a bouncer at an Irish bar, and being a bellhop at the Boston Harbor Hotel. White had begun boxing at age 17, and befriended former Golden Gloves champion Peter Welch. Through this relationship, White decided he wanted to enter the fight business, and he started a boxing gym in Boston with Welch. White initially intended to become a professional boxer himself, but was put off the idea after seeing a punch drunk boxer and worrying that he would suffer the same neurodegeneration. White then worked as a boxercise coach.

White has stated he left Boston to return to Las Vegas in the early 1990s after being threatened by mobster Whitey Bulger and his associate Kevin Weeks. "He basically said, 'You owe us money.' It was like $2,500, which was like $25,000 to me back then, and I didn't pay him. This went on for a while and one day I was at my place and I got a call and they said, 'You owe us the money tomorrow by 1 o'clock.' I literally hung up the phone, picked up the phone and called Delta and bought a ticket to Vegas."

In Las Vegas, White continued running boxercise gyms and also began training jiu-jitsu under the tutelage of John Lewis (a competitor in UFC 22 and UFC 28), alongside Lorenzo Fertitta and his older brother Frank Fertitta III. White had reconnected with the Fertitta brothers after meeting Lorenzo at a mutual friend's wedding; they had not spoken to each other in 10 years prior to this encounter. It was in Lewis' practices where White met mixed martial artists Tito Ortiz and Chuck Liddell and ultimately became their manager.

== Career ==
=== Ultimate Fighting Championship ===
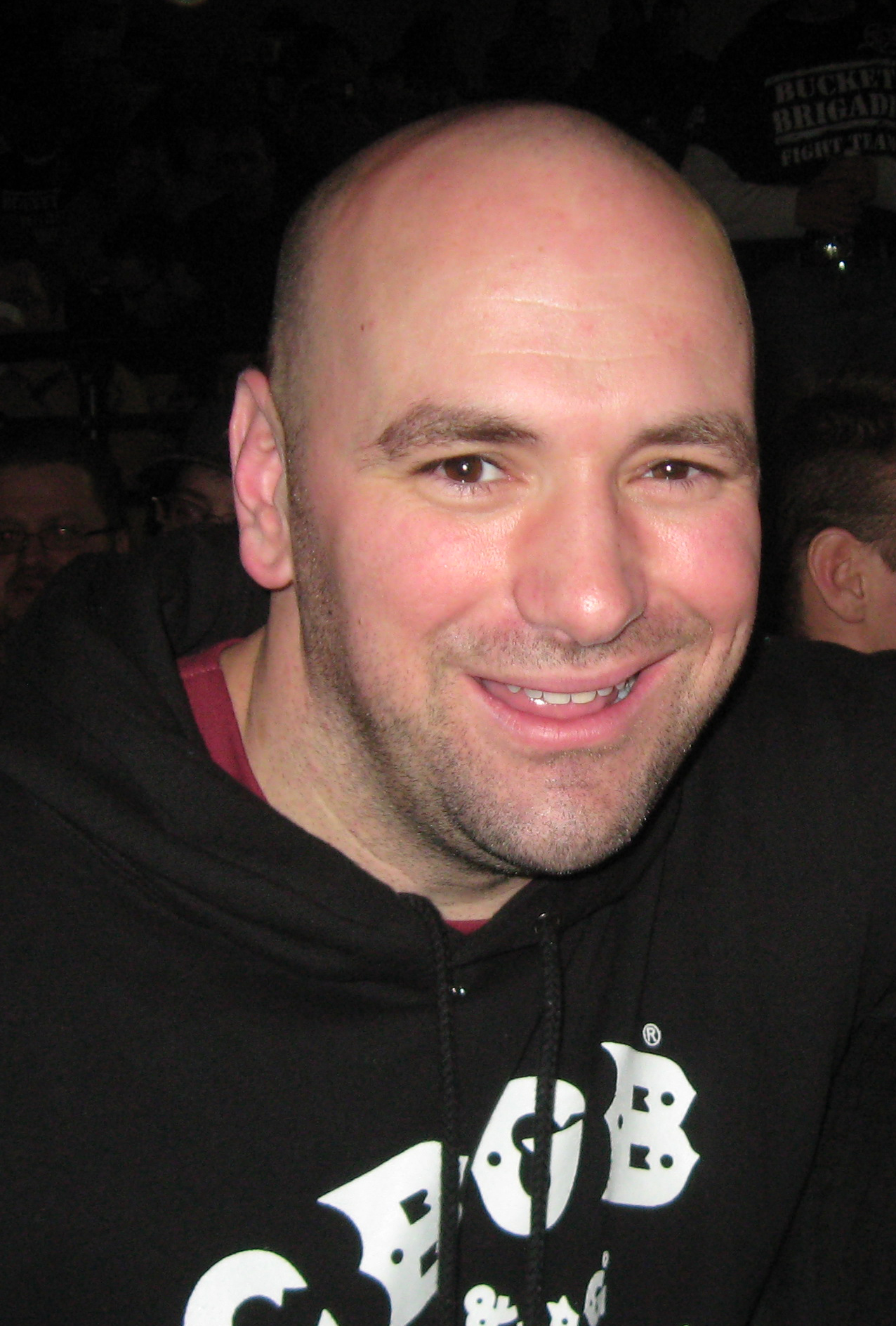
White in 2008

While working as a manager for Ortiz and Liddell, White met Bob Meyrowitz, the owner of Semaphore Entertainment Group, the then-parent company of the Ultimate Fighting Championship (UFC). When White learned that Meyrowitz was looking to sell the UFC, he contacted his friend Lorenzo Fertitta (an executive and co-founder of Station Casinos, and former commissioner of the Nevada Athletic Commission), to ask if he would be interested in acquiring the company. In January 2001, Lorenzo and his older brother Frank acquired the UFC for $2 million (equivalent to $3.6 million in 2025); it subsequently became a subsidiary of Zuffa. White was installed as the company's president. He was also granted a stake in the company as a finder's fee and as sweat equity.

White said that when he and the Fertittas acquired the UFC, all they received was the brand name "UFC" and an old octagon. The previous owners had stripped the company's assets to avoid bankruptcy, so much so that the UFC.com website had been sold to a company named "User Friendly Computers". The first UFC cards under White's leadership, UFC 30 and UFC 31, were held in the Trump Taj Mahal, which led to the development of White's long-term friendship with Donald Trump. White re-hired Joe Rogan, who had previously conducted backstage interviews at UFC events; Rogan made his debut as a color commentator at UFC 37.5 in June 2002.

The UFC did not immediately have success after the Zuffa takeover, and by 2004 the Fertittas had invested over $40 million (equivalent to $68 million in 2025) into the company without attaining significant growth or reaching profitability. White, alongside the Fertittas and television producer Craig Piligian, developed the idea of an MMA-based reality series, The Ultimate Fighter, as an attempt to create interest in the sport. The company self-funded the show as television networks refused to pay for the cost of production. The Ultimate Fighter, particularly the finale fight between Stephan Bonnar and Forrest Griffin, is credited for having "saved the UFC". Under White's leadership the UFC subsequently developed into a highly successful business; in 2006, UFC 66 headlined by Chuck Liddell and Tito Ortiz generated over 1,000,000 pay-per-view buys, and by 2008 the company was valued by Forbes at $1.1 billion.

In 2010, Flash Entertainment, a subsidiary of the Abu Dhabi Government, bought a 10% stake in Zuffa for a reported $150–175 million, leaving White with a 9% stake in the company and the Fertittas with 40.5% each. In a 2011 street interview with TMZ Sports, White responded "never ever" to the question: "When will we see women in the UFC?" He later reversed this stance and in February 2013 the UFC held its first women's bout, featuring Ronda Rousey and Liz Carmouche. Rousey subsequently became one of the UFC's two main marquee stars in the mid-2010s, alongside Conor McGregor. The pair accounted for 4.6 million pay-per-view buys in 2015, 61% of the company's total buyrate that year, as the UFC's gross revenue reached $600 million in 2015.

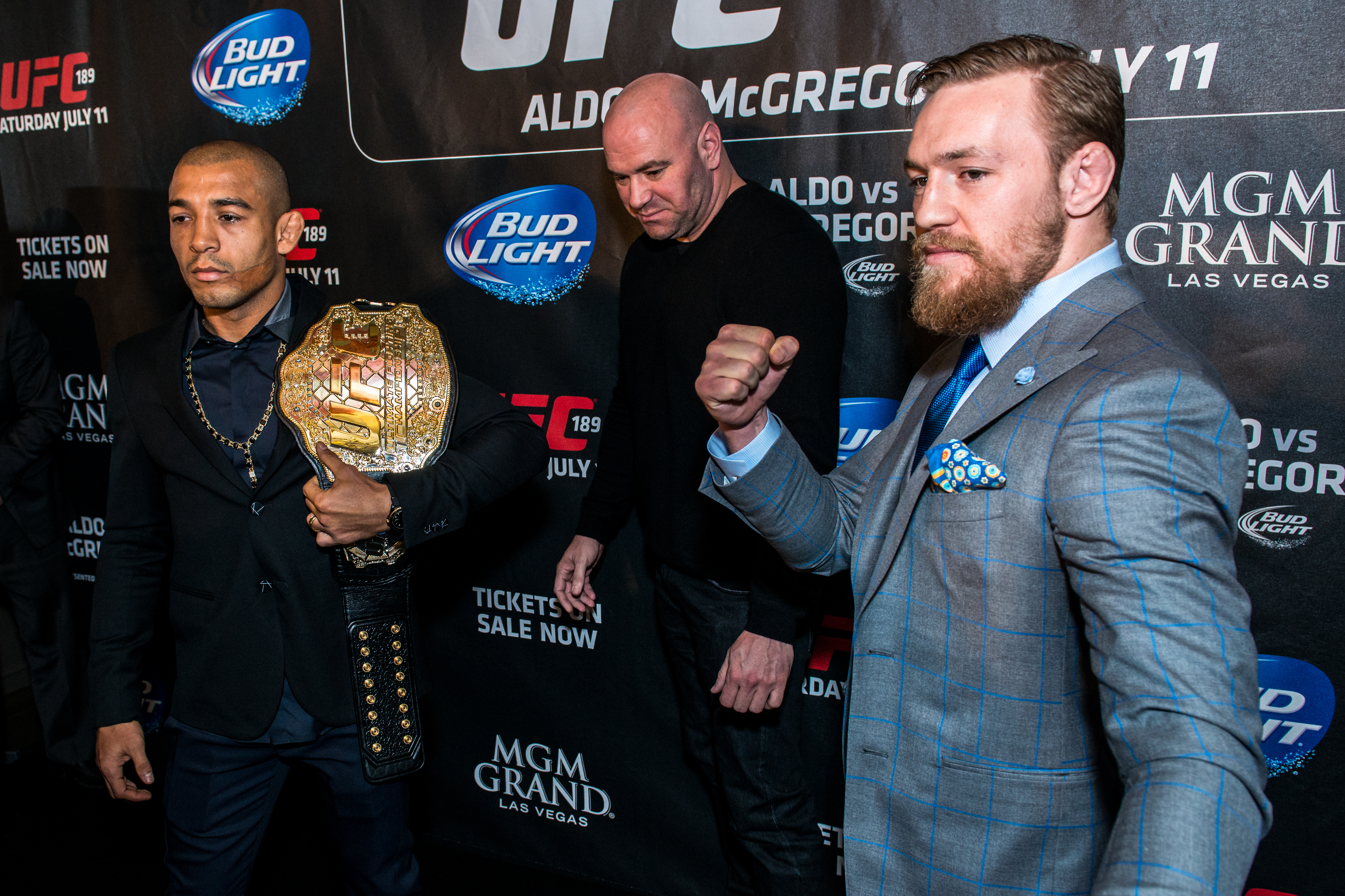
White (center) with UFC fighters José Aldo (left) and Conor McGregor, 2015

In July 2016, Zuffa was sold to a consortium of investors led by WME-IMG for $4.025 billion. White owned 9% of the company at the time of the sale. White continued in his role as president, and was given a stake in the new business. In March 2019, White signed a new, seven-year contract to remain president of the UFC, as the UFC signed a deal with ESPN. In April 2023, Endeavor (renamed from WME-IMG) announced a deal that would see professional wrestling company WWE merge with UFC to form a new public company, TKO Group Holdings. White was subsequently given the title of chief executive officer of the UFC.

In August 2025, White stated the UFC had reached a seven-year, $7.7-billion broadcast deal with Paramount and CBS. Set to begin in 2026 when the ESPN contract expires, White said the deal would mean "[f]or the first time ever, fans in the US will have access to all UFC content without a Pay-Per-View model." In February 2026, White testified in Nevada Federal District Court as part of an anti-trust investigation into the UFC that he was no longer involved in negotiating contracts or matchmaking with fighters, stating that since 2017 this business has been handled by his delegates Hunter Campbell, Mick Maynard and Sean Shelby. Campbell testified that White is focused on the UFC's strategy and overall growth, stating: "I run the fight business, and [White] runs the entire company."

=== Boxing ===
White entered the boxing scene by co-promoting Floyd Mayweather Jr. vs. Conor McGregor due to McGregor being contracted to the UFC. In October 2017, White said at Freddie Roach's Wild Card West boxing club that he was "getting into boxing, 100 percent". In 2019 White said that he wanted to incorporate boxing into the company portfolio of the UFC. He later backpedaled on these plans, stating in 2022 that boxing promotion is "a broken business that is an absolute nightmare to try to fix". In 2024, White promoted a card featuring Irish boxer Callum Walsh which was streamed on UFC Fight Pass. He subsequently re-announced his intention to enter boxing promotion, and said he was "coming in guns blazing" in 2025.

In March 2025, White announced a partnership with Turki Al-Sheikh, head of Saudi Arabia's General Entertainment Authority, to create a new boxing league named Zuffa Boxing, modeled after the UFC. The UFC's parent company TKO Group Holdings and the Saudi entertainment conglomerate Sela were announced as backers of the venture. White was named as executive leader of the league.

Zuffa Boxing held its first numbered event, Zuffa Boxing 01, in January 2026. It was hosted at the Meta Apex in Las Vegas and was headlined by a bout between Callum Walsh and Carlos Ocampo. The first bout for a Zuffa Boxing title was contested between cruiserweights Jai Opetaia and Brandon Glanton, at Zuffa Boxing 04 in March 2026.

=== Other ventures ===
In 2017, White began hosting Dana White's Contender Series. Available initially through UFC Fight Pass, the promotion's digital streaming service, and licensed separately from the UFC brand, the show allows burgeoning fighters to compete for a contract in the UFC.

White was an executive producer of The Ultimate Surfer, a surfing competition television series styled after The Ultimate Fighter. It was created by Kelly Slater, a professional surfer and long-time friend of White. The show premiered on ABC in August 2021, and was canceled after one season due to low ratings.

In 2022, White became a co-owner of Thrill One Sports & Entertainment, which owns the properties of Nitro Circus, Nitrocross, and Street League Skateboarding.

White alongside the Fertittas co-founded Power Slap, a slap fighting competition that debuted in January 2023 and was previously televised on TBS. After TBS did not renew its deal with Power Slap, the competition began to be aired on the digital streaming platform Rumble.

In January 2025, Meta Platforms announced that White had been elected to its board of directors.

In May 2025, White partnered with 1st Phorm and Anheuser-Busch to found Phorm Energy, a zero-sugar energy drink venture.

== Personal life ==
White met his wife Anne (née Stella) when they were in the eighth grade, and they married in 1996. They have two sons and one daughter. White bought a mansion in Pine Island Court, Las Vegas, in 2006 from Frank Fertitta III for $1.95 million. White bought three other mansions in the same area from October 2016 to June 2017 for a combined total of around $6.2 million. Demolition permits were issued for the houses, presumably with the intent of creating a mega-mansion for White and his family.

White was raised as a Catholic and was an altar boy when he was a child, but said in 2008 that he is an atheist. White stated in 2023: "I don't believe in much, but I believe in karma for some reason. I never really was guided by religion in any way shape or form as I got into my 20s."

In 2011, White's mother, June, released the book Dana White, King of MMA: An Unauthorized Biography. June claimed in the book that, since his success with the UFC, Dana had "turned his back on his family and friends who were there for him when he needed help and support".

=== Health issues ===
In May 2012, White revealed that he had been diagnosed with Ménière's disease, an inner ear disorder. He said, "It's like vertigo but on steroids." White said that the disease was brought on because of a large fight he was involved in during his youth. The UFC on Fuel TV 3: Korean Zombie vs. Poirier event in May 2012 was the first UFC card he had missed in 11 years with White staying home, adhering to medical advice. A side effect is that he is partially deaf on his left ear.

White underwent Orthokine treatment for Ménière's disease in 2013, which he says has greatly reduced his symptoms.

In 2022, White stated he had undergone medical testing and was diagnosed with extremely high triglyceride levels and other irregularities. He was given 10.4 years left to live if he did not rectify the problems. White said that since then he has adhered to a keto diet, which he says has remedied his sleep apnea and alleviated his leg pain. The regimen was prescribed by biologist Gary Brecka, whom White credited for the improvement in his health.

=== Politics ===
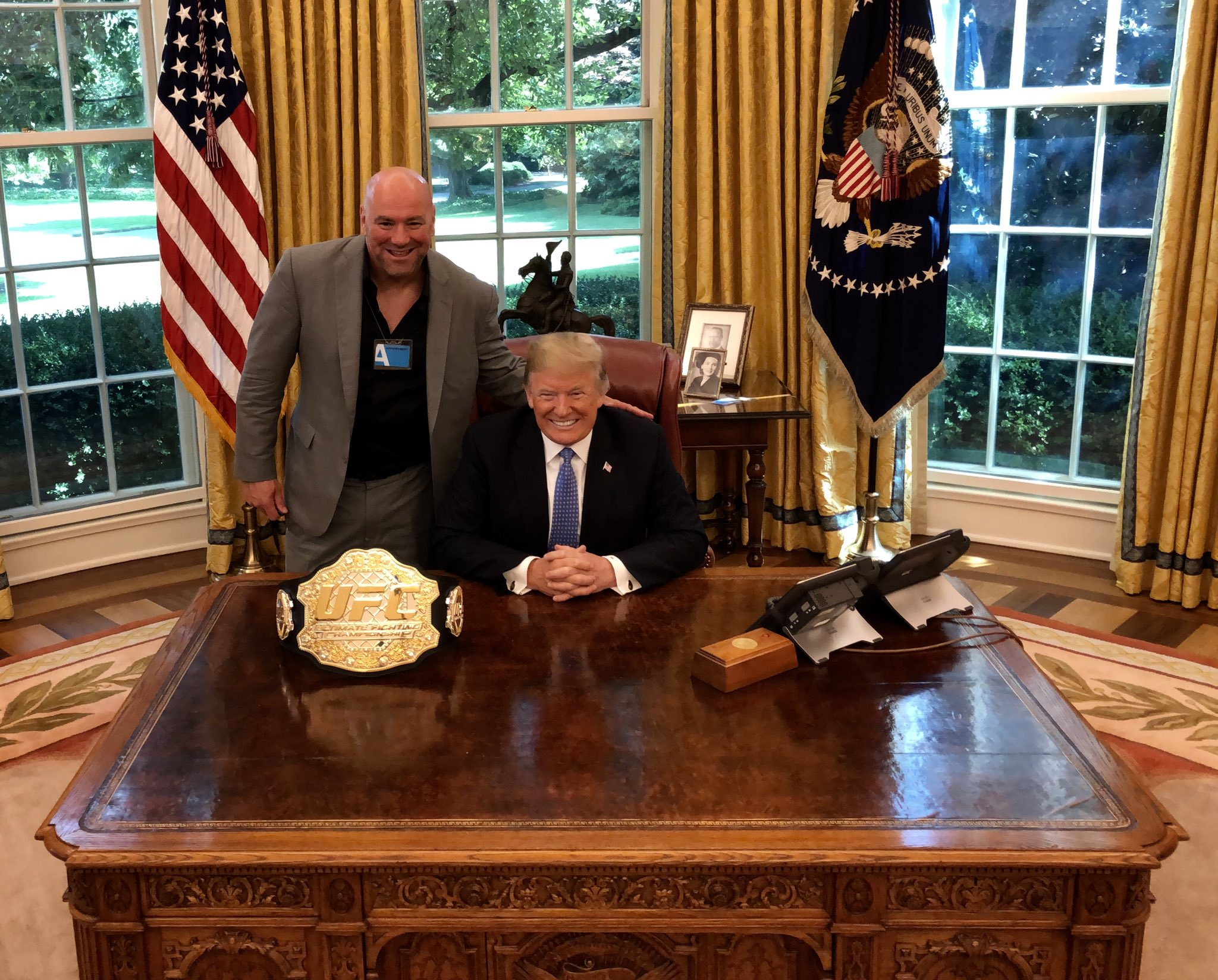
Dana White with President Donald Trump in 2018

White spoke at the 2016 Republican National Convention, where he endorsed Republican nominee Donald Trump. White said that Trump helped the UFC at its beginnings, allowing the UFC to host its first event under Zuffa ownership (UFC 30) at the Trump Taj Mahal when other venues refused to host the UFC. White said, "No arenas wanted us. This guy reached out, and he's always been a friend to me."

White reiterated his support for Trump for the 2020 election and spoke at the podium at a Trump reelection rally in Colorado. In February 2020, White donated $1 million to America First Action, a super political action committee that supported Trump's re-election bid. In April 2020, White joined a group of industry leaders to help the United States rebuild its economy hit by the coronavirus pandemic. White again endorsed Trump in the 2024 election and introduced him at the 2024 Republican National Convention.

White was present at the 2026 White House Correspondents' Dinner shooting, and openly bragged that he ignored commands from authorities when they stormed the room while Trump evacuated the scene: "Tables getting flipped over, guys running in with guns and they were screaming 'Get down.' I didn't get down. It was fucking awesome. I literally took every minute of it in, and it was a pretty crazy, unique experience. We were sitting right in front of the table, right in front of where the president was. Nobody got tackled, but guys came in looking for shooters and they came toward our table. I thought the shooter was over by us or something." Yahoo Sports described the manner in which he recalled the event as "startling".

On November 7, 2026, President Trump offered White the role of White House Press Secretary in a Truth Social post, following Katie Zacharia's brief tenure at the post. In the same post Trump also stated that he requested White to have UFC fighters Islam Makhachev, Khabib Nurmagomedov, Justin Gaethje, Daniel Cormier, Amanda Nunes, and Kayla Harrison as his assistants. It has been suggested by AlterNet and others that Trump may have confused White with Dana W. White, a former assistant to the secretary of defense for public affairs during Trump's first tenure.

On the following day, Trump said that he was "kidding" and merely meant it as a joke, and revealed that White actually likes the idea of becoming Press Secretary. However, White still flew to Washington, D.C. on the 9th, for a meeting with Trump regarding the role and subsequently stood by Trump during that day's press conference. White also took the podium and answered questions from reporters during the press conference.

=== Hobbies and interests ===
White is a fan of the Beastie Boys, Red Hot Chili Peppers and Rage Against the Machine. Speaking on the passing of Adam Yauch, White said: "I seriously haven't been impacted by a death in a long time like I was with the Beastie Boys." White also has a guitar hand-signed by all three members of the Beastie Boys in his office.

White has been a fan of the New England Patriots since childhood, and has stated that he is an admirer of the former Patriots quarterback Tom Brady. White said in a 2022 interview alongside Rob Gronkowski that he had worked to negotiate a deal which would have brought Brady and Gronkowski to the Las Vegas Raiders in 2020, but Jon Gruden nixed the deal and the duo instead signed with the Tampa Bay Buccaneers.

White began training Brazilian jiu-jitsu in 1998, and stated it had a positive impact on him and made him realize the importance of having ground skills in fighting situations.

In a season 15 episode of History Channel's Pawn Stars (originally airing on February 5, 2018), White purchased around $60,000 worth of katana swords, including one of Rick Harrison's 17th-century Japanese katanas.

White is a recreational gambler. He plays high-stakes blackjack, and has been limited from playing at multiple casinos in Las Vegas. He states he plays $75,000 a hand, and if he wins the first couple of hands, he takes the $150,000 profit and leaves. White also gambles on sports. He stated in 2021 that the biggest sports bet he had placed was in 2007, when he wagered $1 million on Jermain Taylor to beat Kelly Pavlik. Taylor lost the bout by technical knockout, and White said about the experience, "I was in Cabo, relaxing having fun. That ruined my fun. Ruined my whole trip." White stated in 2024 that he plays high-stakes baccarat, and wagers up to $350,000 per hand at Caesars Palace. He claims to have lost $8 million in one night, and from January to March 2024 to have won $26 million at Caesars Palace. White stated a "goal in life before I die" is for a casino to allow him to play $1 million per hand.

=== Altercation with his wife ===
During a 2022 New Year's Eve party at a nightclub in Cabo San Lucas, Mexico, White and his wife Anne were filmed arguing and then getting into a physical altercation with each other. Anne slapped White and White responded by slapping her in return. They both apologized for their actions, and said they had consumed too much alcohol that night. The UFC did not respond or address White's actions after the incident. The California Legislative Women's Caucus sent a letter to Ari Emanuel, CEO of Endeavor, the company that owns the UFC, requesting White be removed from his role in the UFC.

=== Charity work ===
In 2010, White donated $50,000 for a liver transplant to Tuptim Jadnooleum, the daughter of "Kru Nai" Rattanachai, one of the instructors for Tiger Muay Thai and MMA in Phuket, Thailand. In 2011, White donated $100,000 to his former high school to fund renovations to their athletic facilities. In 2017, White donated $1 million to the victims of the Las Vegas shooting. In 2019, after UFC 242, Khabib Nurmagomedov raised $100,000 for Dustin Poirier's charity, The Good Fight Foundation, White followed and also donated $100,000 to Poirier's charity foundation. In 2024, White donated $50,000 towards the support of victims affected by the attempted assassination of former president Donald J. Trump during a rally held on July 13 in Butler, Pennsylvania. In 2025, ahead of UFC 311, Jiri Prochazka raised $50,000 through his organization, The BJP Foundation; White followed and also donated $50,000, generating a total of $100,000 for oncology patients.

== Awards ==
- Martial Arts History Museum Hall of Fame
  - Class of 2009
- Armed Forces Foundation
  - Patriot Award (2009)
- World MMA Awards
  - Leading Man of the Year (2008–24)
- Wrestling Observer Newsletter
  - Promoter of the Year (2005–13; 2015–16)
- Other accomplishments
  - Nevada Sportsman of the Year (2009)
  - The Sports Museum at TD Garden Special Achievement Award (2023)
