= Hunter Campbell =

American lawyer and businessman (born 1984)

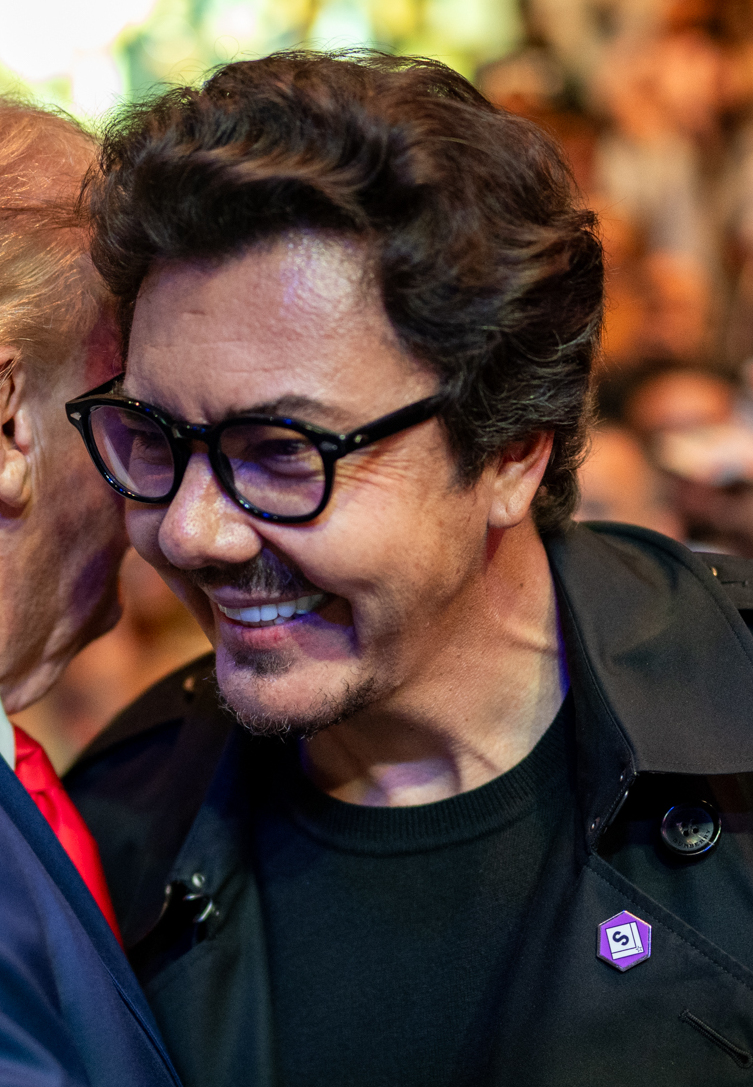
- Campbell in 2025
- Born: William Hunter Campbell; 1984 (age 41–42); Las Vegas, Nevada, U.S.
- Education: Washington University in St. Louis (BA); Columbia University (MsC); University of Nevada, Las Vegas (JD)
- Known for: Chief business officer of the Ultimate Fighting Championship
- Height: 6 ft 3 in (191 cm)

William Hunter Campbell (born 1984) is an American businessman and lawyer. He is the chief business officer of the Ultimate Fighting Championship.

== Early life and education ==
Campbell was born and raised in Las Vegas, Nevada. His father Donald was a renowned attorney who founded the law firm Campbell & Williams in 1986. Growing up in Las Vegas as a sports fan, Campbell was drawn to prize fighting and UNLV basketball. He also dreamed of becoming a casino owner. Campbell's first job was as a busboy for Michael Gaughan, Frank Toti and Tito Tiberti of Coast Casinos; he later worked on cases for Gaughan and Tiberti after becoming a lawyer.

After earning a BA from Washington University in St. Louis, Campbell received a MsC from Columbia University. He had an internship at the Ultimate Fighting Championship (UFC) in 2006. Campbell attended UNLV's William S. Boyd School of Law, where he graduated with his JD in 2011.

== Career ==
Campbell passed his bar examination and was admitted to the State Bar of Nevada in 2012. He subsequently began working at his father's law firm, Campbell & Williams. In this capacity, Campbell became Dana White's personal attorney. When the UFC was sold to WME-IMG in 2016 and Lorenzo Fertitta exited the company, White recruited new employees, one of whom was Campbell. He became the UFC's general counsel and later the company's executive vice-president. In his first week as general counsel, White assigned Campbell to negotiate then-UFC heavyweight champion Stipe Miocic's contract.

In April 2019, Campbell was appointed as the UFC's chief business officer. In 2021, reporter Ariel Helwani claimed that Campbell was the "third most important person in the company behind Ari [Emanuel] and White." White described Campbell in 2024 as his "wartime consigliere", adding: "We’ve always had a lawyer involved on the fight side of things because obviously there’s contractual issues ... and no one has ever done it as good as Hunter has. He’s super passionate about the sport, he’s super passionate about fighting and he’s a fucking great lawyer." As of 2024, Campbell's involvement at the UFC included negotiating contracts with high-profile names such as Conor McGregor, helping foreign fighters obtain visas, as well as working in conjunction with athletic commissions and anti-doping agencies.

Campbell was featured in the 2024 documentary Fight Inc: Inside the UFC, where his prominent role in the UFC was displayed. He subsequently received public attention. Campbell rarely conducts interviews, has no social media, and stated the publicity had "literally zero" effect on his life. He said to the Sports Business Journal in 2024: "I’m not overly interested in the public component to it. ... But I love what we do. I swear to God, I wake up every day and before fighting, after fighting, I cannot believe I get paid to do this as a living. It doesn’t feel real."

In February 2026, during testimony as part of an anti-trust investigation into the UFC, Campbell was stated to be in charge of the UFC's matchmaking and contract negotiations, having been given these responsibilities by Dana White. Explaining his role in the UFC, Campbell testified: "I run the fight business, and [White] runs the entire company."
