= Peter Cook (press secretary) =

American government official and press secretary

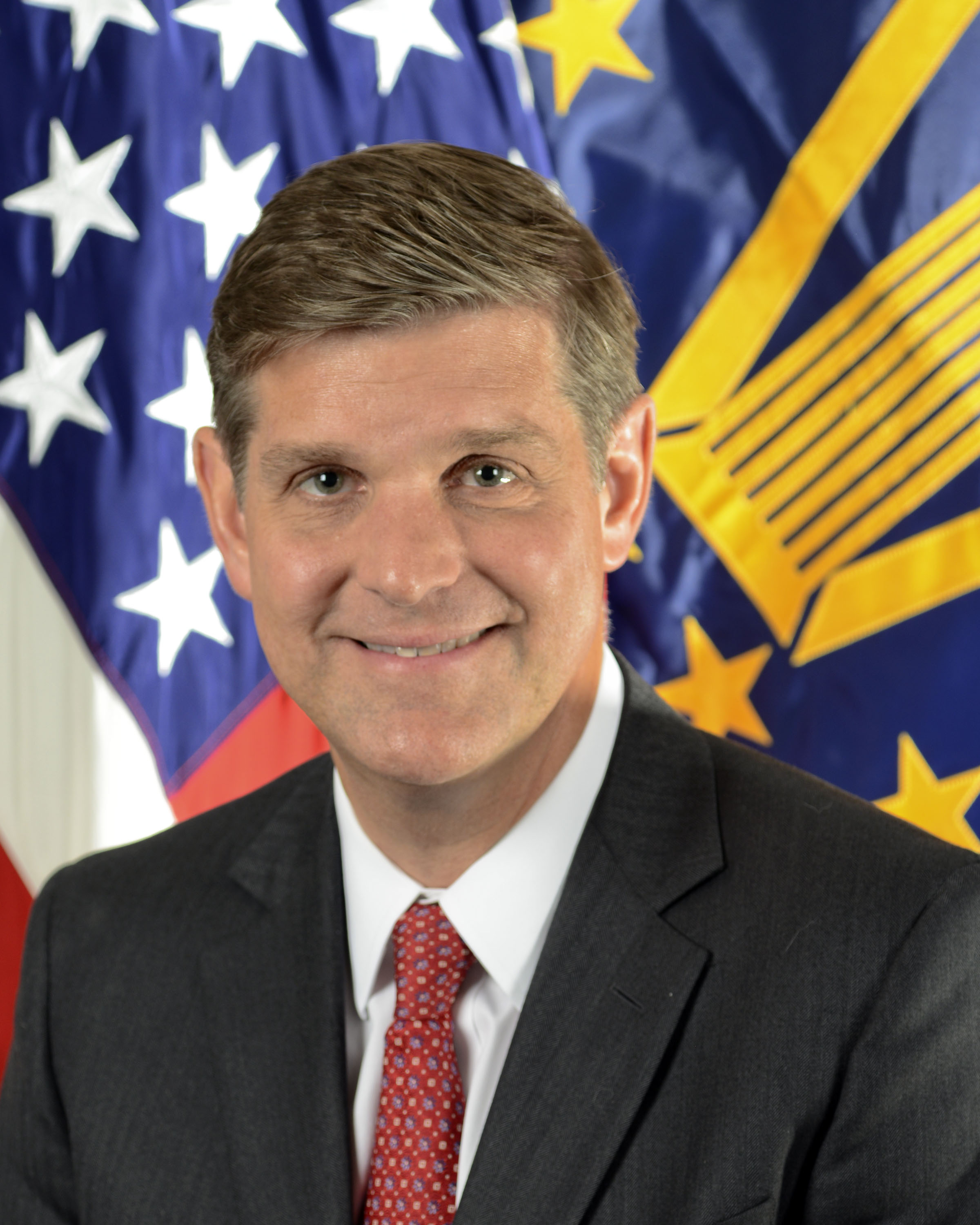

Assistant to the Secretary of Defense for Public Affairs
- In office November 2015 – January 20, 2017
- President: Barack Obama
- Preceded by: Maura Sullivan
- Succeeded by: Dana W. White

Personal details
- Born: Washington, D.C.
- Education: Duke University (BA); Northwestern University (MA)

Peter Cook is an American communications consultant, journalist, and former government official, currently serving as executive vice president and chief communications officer of the American Bankers Association. He served as press secretary to Ash Carter and as the Assistant to the Secretary of Defense for Public Affairs, replacing Maura Sullivan. He previously served as the Washington anchor for Bloomberg Television.

== Personal life ==
Cook was born and raised in Washington, D.C. He attended St. Albans School before graduating from St. George's School in Rhode Island. He earned a Bachelor of Arts from Duke University and Master of Arts from the Medill School of Journalism at Northwestern University.

== Career ==
Cook began his career in broadcast journalism as an intern for Nightline and hosted shows on Duke Union Community Television.

After college, Cook spent ten years in local news as an anchor and reporter.

In 2000, he helped launch EnergyNewsLive.com. He served as News Director and Washington Bureau Chief for the web-based energy news service, leading the publication's coverage of the California power crisis and the Enron collapse.

Cook worked as a producer and reporter for NBC News and MSNBC. He was assigned to The Pentagon during the Iraq War.

Cook joined Bloomberg Television in October 2003. As Washington anchor and correspondent, he co-anchors Bloomberg's morning programming and reports on the intersection of business and government. He has interviewed Tim Geithner, Henry Paulson, Lawrence Summers, Chris Dodd, Mitch McConnell, and Jamie Dimon.

Cook hosted Bloomberg's "Money & Politics". He anchored the network's primary season and election night coverage, interviewing the major candidates including Barack Obama and John McCain. Cook routinely covers the Fed, Treasury, White House and Congress. Previously he did extensive reporting on the Gulf Coast's recovery from Hurricane Katrina, and traveled to Beijing with Secretary Paulson for a closer look at the economic relationship between the U.S. and China.
