= Power Slap =

American slap fighting promotion company

- Type: Private
- Industry: Slap fighting promotion
- Founded: 2022
- Founder: Lorenzo Fertitta; Dana White
- Headquarters: Las Vegas, Nevada, U.S.
- Area served: United States; Worldwide
- Key people: Lorenzo Fertitta (Founder and co-owner); Dana White (Founder, co-owner and promoter); Nicholas Cvjetkovich (Recruiter and matchmaker)
- Owner: Lorenzo Fertitta; Dana White
- Parent: Schiaffo LLC
- Website: powerslap.com

Power Slap: Road to the Title
- Genre: Combat sport Reality
- Country of origin: United States
- Original language: English
- No. of seasons: 3
- No. of episodes: 32

Production
- Executive producer: Dana White
- Production companies: Ultimate Fighting Productions, LLC; Pilgrim Media Group; TBS Productions; Warner Bros. Discovery

Original release
- Network: TBS (season 1); Rumble (season 1 – outside the U.S.; seasons 2 and 3 – worldwide); YouTube (season 3 onward)
- Release: January 18, 2023 – present

Power Slap is an American slap fighting promotion company co-owned by Zuffa, LLC founder Lorenzo Fertitta and Dana White, the chief executive officer of the Ultimate Fighting Championship (UFC).

Power Slap first gained notoriety by producing a reality television show titled Power Slap: Road to the Title, originally broadcast by the TBS network in the United States and on Rumble internationally. Contestants on the show slapped each other in the face to win the "Power Slap League" tournament. The show's first season consisted of eight pre-recorded episodes and was followed by the Power Slap 1 live event that aired exclusively on Rumble.

The show was executive produced by Power Slap's owner Dana White. The show was due to premiere on January 11, 2023, but was delayed a week after White was filmed slapping his wife in a Mexican nightclub at a New Year's Eve party.

The show, considered the premier program of the slap fighting combat sport, had significantly lower ratings than its professional wrestling lead-in programming, AEW Dynamite, consistently drawing around 250,000 viewers compared to Dynamite's near 800,000 viewers. On March 13, 2023, Warner Bros. Discovery and TBS representatives confirmed to media sources that the network would no longer air Power Slap: Road to the Title following its first-season finale, which had aired the week prior, partly due to its low ratings. After Road to the Title's cancellation by TBS, White confirmed that Power Slap would continue to hold events and produce content for Rumble. During the Power Slap 5 live event, it was announced that the second season of Road to the Title was set to air on Rumble. The second season began airing on November 15, 2023. The third season began airing on July 24, 2024. Power Slap content later moved from Rumble to YouTube.

== Rules ==
Power Slap, which has been licensed by the Nevada State Athletic Commission, uses rules similar to those established by other slap fighting leagues. After a coin toss to decide who goes first, the first striker has a time limit of 60 seconds to deliver an open-handed slap to the opponent. Slaps must be below the eye but above the chin, without leading with the palm such that all hand to face contact takes place at the same time. The person being slapped may not flinch, raise their shoulder or tuck in their chin. After being slapped, the slapped competitor then has 60 seconds to recover before they get back into position prior to their turn to slap. Fights which do not end in a knockout and go three rounds go to the judges' decision, using a 10-point system with judging based on slap strikers' effectiveness as well as the slap receivers' reaction and recovery time. Title bouts are five rounds and in the event of a draw, there will be an extra round to determine the winner of the bout. If the additional round is drawn, the official result of a draw shall stand.

Participants are separated by weight and gender.

== Criticism and health risks ==
Upon initial airing, Power Slap: Road to the Title created controversy concerning the health of the participants and the inherent danger of the show. Neuroscientist, chronic traumatic encephalopathy researcher, and former professional wrestler Christopher Nowinski observed one of the show's participants displaying the fencing response after being struck, indicating serious brain injury. Greek neurologist Nikolas Evangelou called the show a "recipe for disaster" due to how "impact to the head, from an angle, can cause rotational forces on the brain", leading to "hopefully temporary, but sometimes permanent disruption to brain function" and "even more serious complications". Many combat sports athletes also responded negatively to the show. Boxer and WBC champion Ryan Garcia wrote "Power slap is a horrible idea and it needs to be stopped." UFC fighter Sean O'Malley stated that he refused to watch Power Slap: Road to the Title due to its association with brain injuries.

In response to the criticisms, show producers said, "We spend the money to make sure we have two healthy people in there, proper medical attention during and after the fight. These are the things we need to educate people on, just like we needed to educate people on mixed martial arts." In an interview before the show aired, Dana White said "In Slap, they take three-to-five slaps per event. Fighters in boxing take 300–400 punches per fight. And guess what: you know what my answer to that [criticism of slap fighting] is? If you don't fucking like it, don't watch it! Nobody's asking you to watch this. Oh, you're disgusted by it? Watch The Voice."

On February 16, 2023, Bill Pascrell, a Congressman from New Jersey, and Don Bacon, a Congressman from Nebraska, announced that they were launching a Congressional inquiry into the ethicality of Power Slap. That same month, one of the world's leading experts on chronic traumatic encephalopathy, Dr. Bennet Omalu, called for slap fighting shows to be removed from television. Omalu stated, in response to White's claims that he was making slap fighting as safe as possible, "It is a very dumb [sport], very stupid and unsafe. It is primitive. To me, such a sport is inconsistent with the intelligence of humans. It is possible that a participant could die from this. Somebody could die or suffer catastrophic brain damage and become a vegetable. How can he [Dana White] make that statement? It is like saying you will make a loaded gun safe [...] Why is TBS showing such a primitive sport? It should not be on TV."

== List of events ==
#	Event	Date	Venue	Location
28	Power Slap 28: Perez vs. Singh	December 3, 2026	The Venue	Riyadh, Saudi Arabia
27	Power Slap 27: Quinones vs. Godfrey	November 19, 2026	ABHA Arena	Doha, Qatar
26	Power Slap 26: Greenhalgh vs. Simonds	November 6, 2026	SEF Arena	Riyadh, Saudi Arabia
25	Power Slap 25: Da Hawaiian Hitman vs. Dumpling 2	October 23, 2026	Space42 Arena	Abu Dhabi, United Arab Emirates
24	Power Slap 24: Muniz vs. Hintz	October 9, 2026	The Chelsea	Las Vegas, Nevada, United States
23	Power Slap 23: Wolverine vs. Greenhalgh	September 17, 2026	Texas Tech University	Lubbock, Texas, United States
22	Power Slap 22: Bathory vs. Montes	July 30, 2026	Belgrade Arena	Belgrade, Serbia
21	Power Slap 21: Dempster vs. Dubois	July 10, 2026	The Chelsea	Las Vegas, Nevada, United States
20	Power Slap 20: Trujillo vs. Johnson	May 15, 2026	The Chelsea	Las Vegas, Nevada, United States
19	Power Slap 19: Da Hawaiian Hitman vs. Manu	April 17, 2026	The Chelsea	Las Vegas, Nevada, United States
18	Power Slap 18: Wolverine vs. Da Crazy Hawaiian	March 6, 2026	Fontainebleau Las Vegas	Las Vegas, Nevada, United States
17	Power Slap 17: Blackburn vs. Young 2	October 31, 2025	Mohammed Abdo Arena	Riyadh, Saudi Arabia
16	Power Slap 16: Wolverine vs. Klingbeil	October 24, 2025	Space42 Arena	Abu Dhabi, United Arab Emirates
15	Power Slap 15: Bordeaux vs. Quinones 3	October 3, 2025	Fontainebleau Las Vegas	Las Vegas, Nevada, United States
14	Power Slap 14: The Bell vs. Mena	July 18, 2025	XULA Convocation Center	New Orleans, Louisiana, United States
13	Power Slap 13: Dumpling vs. Da Hawaiian Hitman	June 27, 2025	Fontainebleau Las Vegas	Las Vegas, Nevada, United States
12	Power Slap 12: Quinones vs. Bordeaux 2	March 7, 2025	Fontainebleau Las Vegas	Las Vegas, Nevada, United States
11	Power Slap 11: Da Crazy Hawaiian vs. Dumpling 2	January 30, 2025	anb Arena	Riyadh, Saudi Arabia
10	Power Slap 10: The Bell vs. Perez	December 6, 2024	Fontainebleau Las Vegas	Las Vegas, Nevada, United States
9	Power Slap 9: Da Crazy Hawaiian vs. Dumpling	October 24, 2024	Space42 Arena	Abu Dhabi, United Arab Emirates
8	Power Slap 8: Da Crazy Hawaiian vs. Van Heerden	June 28, 2024	Fontainebleau Las Vegas	Las Vegas, Nevada, United States
7	Power Slap 7: The Bell vs. Phillips	April 12, 2024	UFC Apex	Las Vegas, Nevada, United States
6	Power Slap 6: KO Chris vs. Muniz	February 9, 2024	Durango Casino	Spring Valley, Nevada, United States
5	Power Slap 5: Da Crazy Hawaiian vs. Vakameilalo	October 25, 2023	UFC Apex	Las Vegas, Nevada, United States
4	Power Slap 4: Hintz vs. Turpin	August 9, 2023	UFC Apex	Las Vegas, Nevada, United States
3	Power Slap 3: Hintz vs. Wolverine	July 7, 2023	UFC Apex	Las Vegas, Nevada, United States
2	Power Slap 2: Wolverine vs. The Bell	May 24, 2023	UFC Apex	Las Vegas, Nevada, United States
1	Power Slap 1: Darius the Destroyer vs. Wolverine	March 11, 2023	UFC Apex	Las Vegas, Nevada, United States

== Current champions ==
Division	Upper weight limit	Current champion	Since	Defenses
Super heavyweight	266+ lb (120+ kg)	Dayne Viernes	June 27, 2025	2
Heavyweight	265 lb (120 kg)	Damien Dibbell	May 24, 2023	6
Light heavyweight	205 lb (93 kg)	Logan Greenhalgh	November 6, 2026	0
Middleweight	185 lb (84 kg)	Darren Godfrey	November 19, 2026	0
Welterweight	170 lb (77 kg)	Cole Young	October 31, 2025	2
Lightweight	155 lb (70 kg)	Robert Trujillo	March 8, 2025	3
Women's Featherweight	145 lb (66 kg)	Abby Montes	July 30, 2026	0
Women's Flyweight	125 lb (57 kg)	Ellie Dempster	July 10, 2026	0

== Championship history ==
=== Super Heavyweight Championship ===
Weight limit: 266+lb

No.	Name	Event	Date	Reign	Defenses
1	(United States) Koa “Da Crazy Hawaiian” Viernes def. Kalani “Toko” Vakameilalo	Power Slap 5 Las Vegas, Nevada	October 25, 2023	463 days	1. def. Danie “The Pitbull” Van Heerden at Power Slap 8 on Jun 28, 2024; 2. drew with Vasilii “Dumpling” Kamotskii at Power Slap 9 on Oct 24, 2024
2	(Russia) Vasilii “Dumpling” Kamotskii	Power Slap 11; Riyadh, Saudi Arabia	Jan 30, 2025	148 days	
3	(United States) Dayne “Da Hawaiian Hitman” Viernes	Power Slap 13; Las Vegas, Nevada	Jun 27, 2025	511 days (incumbent)	1. def. Makini “Big Mak” Manu at Power Slap 19 on Apr 17, 2026; 2. def. Vasilii “Dumpling” Kamotskii at Power Slap 25 on Oct 23, 2026

=== Heavyweight Championship ===
Weight limit: 265lb

No.	Name	Event	Date	Reign	Defenses
1	(United States) Ron “Wolverine” Bata def. Darius “The Destroyer” Mata-Varona	Power Slap 1 Las Vegas, Nevada	March 11, 2023	74 days	
2	(United States) Damien “The Bell” Dibbell	Power Slap 2 Las Vegas, Nevada	May 24, 2023	1276 days (incumbent)	1. def. Nate “The Buffalo Soldier” Burnard at Power Slap 5 on Oct 25, 2023; 2. def. Ryan “The King of Kings” Phillips at Power Slap 7 on Apr 12, 2024; 3. def. Dorian “Disturbing The Peace” Perez at Power Slap 10 on Dec 6, 2024; 4. def. Wes “Boom” Mena at Power Slap 14 on Jul 18, 2025; 5. def. Darius “The Destroyer” Mata-Varona at Power Slap 19 on Apr 17, 2026; 6. def. Dorian “Disturbing The Peace” Perez at Power Slap 22 on Jul 30, 2026

=== Light Heavyweight Championship ===
Weight limit: 205lb

No.	Name	Event	Date	Reign	Defenses
1	(United States) Ayjay “Static” Hintz def. Vernon “The Mechanic” Cathey	Power Slap 1 Las Vegas, Nevada	March 11, 2023	118 days	1. def. Russel “Kainoa” Rivero at Power Slap 2 on May 24, 2023
2	(United States) Ron “Wolverine” Bata	Power Slap 3 Las Vegas, Nevada	July 7, 2023	1169 days	1. def. Austin “Turp Daddy Slim” Turpin at Power Slap 5 on Oct 25, 2023; 2. def. Vernon “The Mechanic” Cathey at Power Slap 11 on Jan 30, 2025; 3. def. Russel “Kainoa” Rivero at Power Slap 13 on Jun 27, 2025; 4. def. Alan “The Kryptonian" Klingbeil at Power Slap 16 on Oct 24, 2025; 5. def. Layne “Da Crazy Hawaiian” Viernes at Power Slap 18 on Mar 6, 2026; 6. def. Logan “Kill Shot” Greenhalgh at Power Slap 23 on Sep 17, 2026
Bata vacated the title after retiring on Sep 17, 2026.
3	(United States) Logan “Kill Shot” Greenhalgh def. Luke “Lethal Strike” Simonds	Power Slap 26; Riyadh, Saudi Arabia	November 6, 2026	14 days (incumbent)	

=== Middleweight Championship ===
Weight limit: 185lb

No.	Name	Event	Date	Reign	Defenses
1	(United States) John “The Machine” Davis def. Azael “El Perro” Rodriguez	Power Slap 1 Las Vegas, Nevada	March 11, 2023	593 days	1. def. Wesley “All the Smoke” Drain at Power Slap 2 on May 24, 2023; 2. def. Azael “El Perro” Rodriguez at Power Slap 5 on Oct 25, 2023
2	(United States) Isaih “Puerto Rican Pretty Boy” Quinones	Power Slap 9 Abu Dhabi, United Arab Emirates	October 24, 2024	134 days	1. def. Branden “The Butcher” Bordeaux at Power Slap 10 on Dec 6, 2024
3	(United States) Branden “The Butcher” Bordeaux	Power Slap 12; Las Vegas, Nevada	March 7, 2025	210 days	
4	(United States) Isaih “Puerto Rican Pretty Boy” Quinones	Power Slap 15; Las Vegas, Nevada	October 3, 2025	412 days	1. def. Stunt Marshall at Power Slap 21 on Jul 10, 2026
5	(England) Darren “The Tarantula” Godfrey	Power Slap 27; Doha, Qatar	November 19, 2026	1 day (incumbent)	

=== Welterweight Championship ===
Weight limit: 170lb

No.	Name	Event	Date	Reign	Defenses
1	(United States) Christapher “KO Chris” Thomas def. Jesus Gaspar Diaz	Power Slap 1 Las Vegas, Nevada	March 11, 2023	335 days	
2	(United States) Emanuel “No Love” Muniz	Power Slap 6 Spring Valley, Nevada	February 9, 2024	140 days	
3	(United States) Anthony “Babyface” Blackburn	Power Slap 8 Las Vegas, Nevada	June 28, 2024	490 days	1. def. Emanuel “No Love” Muniz at Power Slap 10 on Dec 6, 2024; (Note: Muniz missed weight); 2. def. Azael “El Perro” Rodriguez at Power Slap 13 on Jun 27, 2025
4	(United States) Cole “Full Send” Young	Power Slap 17; Riyadh, Saudi Arabia	October 31, 2025	385 days (incumbent)	1. def. Brandon “The Ripper” Rhodes at Power Slap 21 on Jul 10, 2026; 2. def. Andrew Provost at Power Slap 23 on Sep 17, 2026

=== Lightweight Championship ===
Weight limit: 155lb

No.	Name	Event	Date	Reign	Defenses
1	(United States) Robert “The Real Deal” Trujillo def. Dakota “The Maritime Menace” Mcgregor	Power Slap 12; Las Vegas, Nevada	March 7, 2025	623 days (incumbent)	1. def. Dakota “The Maritime Menace” McGregor at Power Slap 14 on Jul 18, 2025; 2. def. Hayden Johnson at Power Slap 20 on May 15, 2026; 3. def. Bryan “Baby Yoda” Scambler at Power Slap 27 on Nov 19, 2026

=== Women's Featherweight Championship ===
Weight limit: 145lb

No.	Name	Event	Date	Reign	Defenses
1	(Mexico) Abby “Brave” Montes def. Sheena “The Hungarian Hurricane” Bathory	Power Slap 22; Serbia, Belgrade	July 30, 2026	113 days (incumbent)	

=== Women's Flyweight Championship ===
Weight limit: 125lb

No.	Name	Event	Date	Reign	Defenses
1	(Canada) Ellie “Belly” Dempster def. Zoe Dubois	Power Slap 21; Las Vegas, Nevada	July 10, 2026	133 days (incumbent)	
