= Happy Slapping (film) =

- Theatrical release poster
- Directed by: Christos Sourligas
- Written by: Andrew Farrar, Christos Sourligas
- Produced by: Debra Kouri, Christos Sourligas
- Starring: Jesse Camacho; Alex Harrouch; Laurin Padolina; Jaa-Smith Johnson; Erica Deutschman
- Cinematography: Luc Montpellier
- Edited by: Joseph Bohbot, Tony Asimakopoulos
- Music by: Tim Rideout, Annakin Slayd
- Production company: One Man Band Films
- Distributed by: Video Services Corp, Cinemavault Releasing
- Release dates: August 2011 (Montreal World Film Festival); September 2, 2014 (North America)
- Running time: 75 minutes
- Country: Canada
- Language: English
- Budget: $250,000

Happy Slapping is a 2011 Canadian drama film about disaffected youths, teen angst and bullying. Its title is derived from the "happy slapping" fad which began in Britain where teens assault strangers on the street, film the encounters on their smartphones and circulate them on mobile phones or post them on user-generated websites. Filmed in Montreal, the film was written and directed by Christos Sourligas and co-written by Andrew Farrar (aka Annakin Slayd) and was shot by the actors on iPhones making it the world's first feature film shot entirely on smartphones.

== Plot ==
Five suburban youths embark on a night of violence in the city, attacking unsuspecting victims while recording the assaults on smartphones. They seek out fame by creating an evening so shocking that their camera phone footage will turn them into instant Internet celebrities. After they are rivaled by another gang and intimidated by their online idol, they are forced to take their mischief up a notch if they want to make a name for themselves.

== Production ==
The film was directed by Canadian filmmaker Christos Sourligas, and written by Sourligas and Andrew Farrar (aka Montreal rapper Annakin Slayd), who has a cameo in the film as one of the victims. Main production was in 2010, but some scenes were added in 2013 to accommodate the "selfie" craze.

The actors acted as cameramen, resulting in a "run and gun" documentary feel. It was described by The Hollywood Reporter as a film that resembles The Blair Witch Project and Paranormal Activity due to the shakiness of the shots; filmmakers tell of crew members having to run behind walls and other items to avoid being caught on film.

== Reception ==
Happy Slapping had its world premiere at the 2011 Montreal World Film Festival.
