= Werribee DVD incident =

2006 crime in Melbourne, Australia

The 2006 Werribee DVD incident occurred in the Australian town of Werribee (a suburb of Melbourne, Victoria), when a group of teenage boys, who collectively called themselves the "Teenage Kings of Werribee", filmed themselves committing various criminal acts, including the sexual assault of a teenage girl with a developmental disability. They then produced a DVD of their actions, which they sold for $5 a copy, and posted their footage to YouTube under the name Cunt: the Movie. The DVD caused widespread controversy after excerpts were broadcast by television current affairs program Today Tonight on 23 October 2006, and led to a police investigation about the content.

== Background ==
Believed to have been filmed in June 2006, the DVD shows twelve boys – all aged under 18 – making chlorine bombs, harassing a homeless man, throwing eggs at taxi drivers, and participating in fights at local parties; it also shows media coverage of incidents that they claim to have been involved in. The footage depicts the group sexually assaulting and humiliating a 17-year-old girl, who has a condition described by The Age as a "mild development delay". Several of the boys were filmed urinating on the girl, setting her hair on fire, forcing her to participate in sexual activity, and also throwing items of her clothing into the Werribee River, where the incident took place. During this time, one boy approaches the camera and states, "What the fuck, she's the ugliest thing I've even seen." The girl had previously communicated with two of the boys using MSN Messenger, and had arranged to meet them at a Werribee shopping centre; when she arrived at Werribee Station, the group of twelve walked with her to the Werribee River.

It is alleged that the group posted segments of the DVD on YouTube during 2006, with a video entitled Pimp My Wife viewed over 2,500 times. On 25 October, the video was removed from the website "due to terms of use violation".

On 29 October, rumours emerged of a sequel, titled CTM2, which apparently depicts some of the youths involved in the first DVD breaking into houses, smashing property, and defecating into kettles and cups.

== Police response ==
Detective Inspector Simon Clemence of Victoria Police's sexual crimes unit stated that the incident was being investigated: "At this stage I think it would be fair to say it is a rape and some indecent assaults as well. We have taken a statement from the girl and she states quite categorically that she was not a willing participant on what occurred on that particular occasion and that confirms the basis of the offence. At this stage the primary offence is the sexual offence and that's a serious sexual assault we are investigating."

Of the DVD itself, he said: "It is quite disturbing, very disturbing actually. I can tell you I have seen the video and there is no humour in it. The girl is the victim of a serious crime, she's very traumatised, the parents are very traumatised, and anyone who thinks this is a bit of a joke perhaps must have a good look at themselves."

The parents of three boys allegedly involved approached police, asking that their sons be formally questioned as part of the investigation. The move followed a police raid on the home of one of the group's members.

On 7 March 2007, eight youths were charged over the DVD and appeared in the Melbourne Children's Court on 27 April 2007 on charges of assault, manufacturing child pornography and procuring sexual penetration by intimidation.

Eight of the youths pleaded guilty and were required to participate in a sexual offenders program. The remaining four denied the charges.

On 5 November 2007, eight of the boys involved (aged between 15 and 17 at the time of offending) were ordered to participate in a rehabilitation program for male adolescents about positive sexuality. Seven had convictions recorded against them. Six were placed on youth supervision orders for between 12 and 18 months and two on probation for 12 months.

== Reactions ==
=== Reactions directly related to the subjects ===
On 24 October 2006, the girl's father was interviewed on 774 ABC Melbourne by host Jon Faine. He stated, "We are going to pursue this to the end to ensure justice comes. It's a horrible, horrible thing that's happened to my daughter."

Some of the young men involved in the DVD are unrepentant, reportedly "boasting and laughing" about the incident.

=== Reactions in government ===
On 24 October 2006, Steve Bracks, Premier of Victoria, commented on the DVD, saying "Frankly I think it's behaviour which the whole of the Victorian community will reject and I know the police are investigating the matter." When interviewed on radio on 26 October, Shane Bourke – the mayor of the City of Wyndham, which includes the suburb of Werribee – had been "an eye-opener not just for our community, but for the rest of Australia." He also said that "what these young people have done is disgusting and abhorrent."

On 27 October, Prime Minister of Australia John Howard commented that the DVD was "appalling, and I hope [the people involved] are caught." Lynne Kosky, Victoria's Minister for Education, cancelled a planned visit to Werribee Secondary College on the same day, with a spokesperson stating that this was to allow for the school to focus on student welfare. A teacher at the school reported that students in uniform and teachers had been abused in the wake of public controversy, and that "just when we most need some support [Kosky's] visit has been pulled."

Helen Coonan, the federal Minister for Communications, Information Technology and the Arts, said that the use of the internet by the group was "a sobering reminder of the underbelly of the internet. While undoubtedly it is a remarkable resource with many positive uses, its ubiquity across the globe means criminal acts are increasingly being captured on video and streamed around the world in seconds."

John North, president of the Law Council of Australia, stated that any persons found to have been involved in the making of the DVD should not be publicly named. He said: "It's appalling behaviour, it's outrageous behaviour, but we shouldn't punish it with that feeling of retribution and revenge. We should try and make sure that people are punished properly if they commit a crime but that the rest of their lives aren't ruined, and some of these people might be quite young and some of them might be quite easily led by stronger peer group pressure."

=== Other reactions ===
When interviewed by the Nine Network, child psychologist Dr. John Cheetham said, "It's the sort of behaviour you would expect in a prison camp. It's something like a flashback to the Second World War and the way the Jews were treated." Mary Bluett, the president of the Victorian branch of the Australian Education Union, which represents teachers in the public education sector, stated: "Parents and schools have to be ever vigilant and aware that young people will act in that way and imitate shows like Jackass, which humiliate people."

Johnny Knoxville, the principal star of the Jackass series, denied suggestions that the series may have inspired the DVD, saying: "We're not mean spirited, we're not evil...Shoot those little bastards." Les Twentyman, a prominent Melbourne social worker, called for an "urgent summit" to address teenage gangs – which represented "signs now of a youth culture that's thumbing their nose at our quality of life" – in the city following the DVD's media coverage.

== Later developments ==
On 13 April 2009, it emerged that one of the boys had put a rap video up on his personal website gloating about the fact that he was not jailed and is unrepentant of his crimes. The lyrics include: "I’m still untouched. When her hair got flamed. They didn’t show her nude, when you look on YouTube".

== See also ==
- Happy slapping
