= Killing of David Morley =

2004 manslaughter in London

David Morley
- Born: David Roger Morley; 3 October 1967; Watford, Hertfordshire, England
- Died: 30 October 2004 (aged 37); Lambeth, London, England
- Occupation: Barman

David Roger Morley (3 October 1967 – 30 October 2004) was a barman who was fatally attacked by a group of youths near Waterloo station in London on the morning of 30 October 2004. The attack garnered widespread media coverage as a fatality of a violent trend known as happy slapping and due to the belief that the attack was motivated by homophobia.

In December 2005, four youths were found guilty of Morley's manslaughter. A fifteen-year-old girl, Chelsea O'Mahoney (aged fourteen at the time of the incident) was sentenced to an 8-year custodial sentence. Her co-defendants Reece Sargeant (21), Darren Case (18) and David Blenman (17), all from Kennington, South London, were sentenced to 12 years each. They had been prosecuted for murder, but the jury returned a verdict of manslaughter as they are permitted to do.

== Background ==
Morley was known in the gay community of London as "Cinders". He was an assistant manager at the Admiral Duncan pub when it was the target of a nail bomb attack in 1999 as part of the attacks against London's minorities by David Copeland. Morley suffered burns during the attack. Friends of Morley said he spent the weeks following the attack visiting and comforting those who had been more seriously injured in hospital. At the time of his death, he was working at another gay bar, Bromptons, in Earls Court.

== Attack ==
The attack on Morley was one of eight that the group carried out in the early hours of 30 October, but they had decided amongst themselves that they would attack people on the evening of 29 October. A 15-year-old associate of the group told police they planned to beat up "tramps, druggies or just people on the street." Morley was the sole fatality. The attacks were carried out between 2.30am and 3.20am.

At 3.10am the group encountered Morley and his friend Alastair Whiteside sitting on a bench near London's Hungerford Bridge. O'Mahoney told Morley they were making a documentary on happy slapping and to "pose for the camera". They proceeded to attack the pair and stole Whiteside's mobile phone. After stealing the phone they continued to attack Morley and Whiteside. Whiteside's witness testimony stated that the girl, O'Mahoney, finished Morley off by kicking him two or three times in the head, "like a football." After this attack the group continued to assault others three more times.

Morley was taken to St. Thomas' Hospital, Lambeth, where he was operated on, but was pronounced dead at 7.40pm. A post-mortem found he had suffered 44 injuries, including five fractured ribs. He died of a hemorrhage from a ruptured spleen and fractured ribs. The pathologist said the injuries were more consistent with those seen after a car accident or someone who had fallen from a great height.

CCTV still of the attack against Wayne Miller

No CCTV images saw O'Mahoney film the attack on Morley (as is the case with happy slap attacks) however she appears to be doing so in CCTV images of the final attack of the night against a homeless man, Wayne Miller. An extensive forensic investigation failed to find pictures or videos of the attacks on any of the assailants' mobile phones.

On 23 January 2006 Sargeant, Case and Blenman were sentenced to twelve years in prison and O'Mahoney to eight years. O'Mahoney had been described as a "child of heroin addicts" with a "particularly chaotic and fragmented life". The other members of the gang were described as "immature and vulnerable to peer pressure".

== Memorial ==
Over 1,000 people attended a vigil in commemoration of Morley's life at St Anne's Church, Soho on 5 November 2004. Speeches were given by his friends, and one on behalf of the Mayor of London Ken Livingstone. Those who could not get into the church due to overcrowding stood in the street with candles. Morley's friend said, "This is the second time he was in the wrong place at the wrong time, but for all of us here today he will be in the right place at the right time, which is a very special place in all of our hearts." Livingstone said, "David Morley was well known and well loved in London's lesbian and gay community."
