= Happy slapping =

Fad of attacking a victim to record the assault

Happy slapping is a fad that originated in the United Kingdom around 2005, in which one or more people attacked a victim for the purpose of recording the assault (commonly with a camera phone or a smartphone). Though the term usually refers to relatively minor acts of violence such as hitting or slapping the victim, more serious crimes such as the murder of a retired care worker and sexual assault were also occasionally classified as "happy slapping" by the BBC.

== Use with video technology ==
The general availability and affordability of mobile phones with integrated video cameras for the first time in the mid 2000s, in addition to their ease of use, meant that, compared to in previous decades, little if any planning was required to carry out and film such an attack. Similarly, the end product was more easily watched and circulated for entertainment than ever before, spreading through informal networks of person to person sharing. Contemporary media commentators suggested that the craze was inspired by such television shows as Jackass, Dirty Sanchez and Bumfights.

== History ==
"Happy slapping" started in the south London Borough of Lewisham, in a format known as "Slap Happy TV", where a happy-slapping video would be recorded, and then watched by dozens of people like a TV show, but in the form of a montage. Videos of Happy Slapping were commonly circulated via Bluetooth on mobile phones. The first newspaper article to use the phrase "happy slapping" was "Bullies film fights by phone", published in the Times Educational Supplement on 21 January 2005, in which reporter Michael Shaw described teachers' accounts of the craze in London schools.

Gary Martin, writing on "The Phrase Finder" website described the phenomenon as: "Unprovoked attacks on individuals made in order to record the event, and especially the victim's shock and surprise, on video phones."

Martin wrote that happy slapping "began as a youth craze in the UK in late 2004. Children or passers by are slapped or otherwise mugged by one or more of a gang while others record the event on video and then distribute it by phone or Internet. Initially the attacks were, as the phrase would have us believe, fairly minor pranks ... As the craze spread the attacks became more vicious—often serious assaults known in legal circles as grievous bodily harm."

== Legal consequences ==
=== Denmark ===
When the international media attention surrounding attacks abroad reached a high point, a girl was sentenced to eight months in prison. She was sentenced on a number of counts including previous crimes.

A common punishment in 2007 was a fine or up to 40 days in prison, suspended if the attacker has no previous record. The attacker shall be liable to a fine or imprisonment for any term which does not exceed 3 years. Happy slapping is judged as "simple battery" as defined by section 244 of the Danish Criminal Code.

=== France ===
In February 2007, an amendment aimed at criminalising "happy slapping" was added to a law "on the prevention of delinquency" by the Parliament of France based on a proposal from then Interior Minister Nicolas Sarkozy. The anti-happy-slapping clause appears as the last part of Article 44, which also deals with ambushing law enforcement personnel. The law equates filming or photographing certain classes of violent crimes, including severe beatings and rape, with being an accomplice of such crimes. The law makes it illegal to broadcast the images of such crimes, punishable by up to 5 years in prison and/or a €75,000 fine.

The law does not apply to those who took the above actions in order to obtain evidence in court, or as professional journalism. Professional journalism is delimited in France by the "press card", which is awarded by a commission representing journalist unions and press organisations. As defined by law, a professional journalist is one whose main activity is professional paid journalism.

The bill was signed into law on 5 March 2007, despite some organisations, including Reporters Without Borders and the French chapter of Wikimedia, arguing that this clause created a legal discrimination in criminal law between professional journalists and ordinary citizens practising journalism. Specifically, it was argued that citizens filming incidents of police brutality and publishing such information online could be intimidated by law enforcement into remaining silent, or prosecuted for their actions. This criticism was relayed by the international media.

French President Nicolas Sarkozy declared to Reporters Without Borders that "the spirit of the law is not to infringe [on] freedom of information. However, if the least doubt subsist[s], then I'm in favour of a clarification of the law."

=== United Kingdom ===
In March 2008, a teenage girl who filmed the fatal beating of a man on her mobile phone was sentenced to two years' detention in the first prosecution of its kind in the United Kingdom. The judge stated that the courts had to make an example of such youths. She had pleaded guilty at Leeds Crown Court in February 2008 to aiding and abetting the murder of Gavin Waterhouse, 29, from Keighley, West Yorkshire. Mark Masters, 19, from Keighley, and Sean Thompson, 17, from Bradford, were sentenced to seven and six years, respectively, after admitting to murder. Waterhouse died from a ruptured spleen after being beaten in September 2007.

Just before the attack, the girl was handed a mobile phone by one of the attackers and told to "video this", prosecutors said. She approached Waterhouse, asked for money, and recorded the subsequent attack. She was sentenced to serve a two-year detention training order. Police said they were satisfied with the court's decision. The Crown Prosecutor said "this is the first time a suspect in England and Wales has been successfully prosecuted for aiding and abetting murder or manslaughter, for the filming of an inaptly called 'happy slapping' incident".

== Media-reported incidents ==
- United Kingdom: On 9 May 2005, a 16-year-old Plant Hill Arts College student was beaten up and left unconscious in a vicious "happy slapping" attack in Blackley, Manchester. Footage of the attack was circulated on students' phones.
- United Kingdom, 18 June 2005: Police arrested three 14-year-old boys for the suspected rape of an 11-year-old girl who attended their school in Stoke Newington, London. Authorities were alerted when school staff saw footage from the students' phones.
- United Kingdom, 7 December 2005: Singer Myleene Klass was happy-slapped in Bermondsey, South London.
- United Kingdom, December 2005: A 15-year-old-girl, Chelsea O'Mahoney (her name was initially withheld, although this decision was reversed during sentencing) and her co-defendants Reece Sargeant, 21, Darren Case, 18, and David Blenman, 17, were all convicted of the manslaughter of David Morley in London. Barry Lee, 20, and another 17-year-old were cleared of all charges. According to press reports, "The 15-year-old girl had told Morley that she was making a documentary about 'happy slapping' before her gang of friends kicked him to death."
- Sweden, 1 September 2006: A 16-year-old boy happy slapped and hospitalised a 15-year-old boy in the city of Örebro. Hours later, the victim's 17-year-old sister stabbed and killed the assailant with a hunting knife and claimed self-defence. The happy slapping was filmed and distributed online. The incidents were considered gang-related.
- Australia, 23 October 2006: Police in Victoria launched an investigation into the production and distribution of a DVD, Cunt: The Movie, featuring footage of several youths sexually assaulting a girl and setting her hair on fire. DVD copies were allegedly sold at the Werribee Secondary College for AU$10.
- United Kingdom, 26 January 2007: Andrew Elvin, 17, was jailed for life, with a minimum custodial sentence of twelve years, for the murder of Luke Salisbury, who died three days after being attacked by Elvin on 2 March 2006. Caine Hallett, 18, was sentenced to five years for manslaughter for the same incident, while Danielle Reeves, 18, faced a retrial in May 2007 for manslaughter.
- United Kingdom, 14 February 2007: Eight youths set upon a 31-year-old man, Curtis Mulcare, in Brighton, who turned out to be an amateur boxer. Two of the youths were hospitalised by the intended victim and four were arrested for causing an affray.
- United Kingdom, July 2007: Anthony Anderson, 27, of Hartlepool, urinated on a dying woman while a friend made a video of the incident. He is reported to have yelled "This is YouTube material!"
- United Kingdom, November 2007: Emily Nakanda, 15, a contestant in the TV show The X Factor, withdrew from the competition after a happy-slapping video in which Nakanda allegedly attacks a teenage girl was discovered on the internet.
- United Kingdom, May 2008: A teenage girl fell to her death from an attic window while trying to escape a "happy slapping" girl gang. Her primary assailant was sentenced to 8 years incarceration while another was ordered detained at a psychiatric facility without a time limit.
- United Kingdom, August 2009: Ekram Haque, a retired care worker was assaulted and killed by two teens as he left his house of worship. Haque's attack was the subject of a BBC3 episode of Our Crime.

== In fiction ==
In the 2006 Doctor Who episode "School Reunion", the Doctor comments on the kids at the school being very well-behaved, expecting them to be "happy-slapping hoodies with ASBOs and ringtones".

A group of British teenagers in the 2008 movie Eden Lake film the torturing and burning of a young boy.

In the 2009 film Harry Brown, a teenager films the murder of an elderly man, which Michael Caine's character uses as evidence to inflict pain on the teenager.

In episode 1 of series 2 of the British political satire The Thick of It, Hugh tells Glenn to happy slap Ollie while Hugh takes a picture of it on Ollie's phone.

In Coronation Street in November 2013, Simon Barlow was the victim of a happy-slapping incident by Faye Windass and Grace Piper. He was attacked, forced into one of his cousin Amy's dresses, and almost had lipstick applied to him. Grace filmed while Faye attacked him.

In 2011, Canadian filmmaker Christos Sourligas directed a film, also called Happy Slapping, about this phenomenon. The film was shot entirely on iPhone 4S by the cast. It was re-edited in 2014 with new material to accommodate the selfie-obsessed market.

== See also ==
- Knockout game
- Livestreamed crime
- Orange Man (advertisement)
