= The Naked Woman =

2004 book by zoologist Desmond Morris

The Naked Woman: A Study of the Female Body
- Author: Desmond Morris
- Language: English
- Subject: Human biology
- Genre: Non-fiction
- Published: 2005
- Publisher: Vintage UK Random House
- Publication place: United Kingdom
- Pages: 276
- ISBN: 0-09-945358-4
- OCLC: 61217417

The Naked Woman: A Study of the Female Body is a book by zoologist Desmond Morris first published in 2004.

The book describes the female body from an evolutionary point of view. It is divided in several chapters, each dedicated to a part of the body, from hair to foot. For each, Morris explains the structure and function of the part, discusses its evolution, the social importance throughout human history, and the artificial modifications and decorations employed by different cultures.

After a chapter on evolution, the succeeding 22 chapters are concerned with, respectively: hair, brow, ears, eyes, nose, cheeks, lips, mouth, neck, shoulders, arms, hands, breasts, waist, hips, belly, back, pubic hair, genitals, buttocks, legs, and feet.
