= Louise Hopkins (cellist) =

British cellist

Louise Hopkins (born 1968) is a cellist from the United Kingdom.

Louise Hopkins studied under Raphael Wallfisch and Steven Isserlis at the Guildhall School of Music and Drama. In 1989 she won the Frank Britton award. A few years later she became professor at the Yehudi Menuhin School and the Guildhall School of Music and Drama.

She made her concerto debut at the Barbican Hall performing the Lutoslawski Concerto with the composer conducting, and since then she has been invited to perform as a soloist in many countries including France, The Netherlands, Belgium, Sweden, New Zealand, Switzerland, The United States, Ireland and throughout the UK. She has broadcast concerto and recital appearances for the BBC, Suisse - Romande, WFMT, Radio France, Radio Classique, New Zealand Radio and RFT. Festival appearances include Aldebrugh, Bath, Cheltenham, Cardiff, Harrogate, Dijon, Salon de Provence and Brighton.

In April 2010, Hopkins became Head of Strings at the Guildhall School of Music and Drama.

== Recordings ==
Louise Hopkins (cello) and Alexandar Madzar (piano): Sonatas for Cello and Piano: Schnittke, Carter & Rachmaninoff.
