= Dana W. White =

American communications executive

Dana White
- Official portrait, 2017

Assistant to the Secretary of Defense for Public Affairs
- In office January 20, 2017 – December 31, 2018
- President: Donald Trump
- Preceded by: Peter Cook
- Succeeded by: Charlie Summers (acting)

Personal details
- Party: Republican
- Relatives: Randolph Lewis White (grandfather)
- Education: University of Chicago (BA)
- Website: Official website

Dana Whitney White is an American communications executive and former government official. She was assistant to the secretary of defense for public affairs and chief Pentagon spokesperson from April 2017 to December 2018, under Secretary of Defense Jim Mattis in the first Trump administration. She had earlier been a staff member of the Senate Armed Services Committee, an editorial writer for The Wall Street Journal in Hong Kong, and director of policy and strategic communications for the Renault–Nissan Alliance.

Her televised Pentagon briefings ended in May 2018. In August of that year CNN reported that the Department of Defense inspector general was investigating complaints from her staff. The inspector general's report, released in July 2019, found that she had misused subordinates' time for personal errands and accepted gifts from them, and did not substantiate a complaint that she had treated staff disrespectfully; White said it had "unfairly maligned acts of kindness done in every office in the Pentagon". She was chief communications officer of Hyundai Motor North America from 2020 to 2022 and a senior managing director at Ankura Consulting Group from 2023 to 2024, and is managing partner of Juno Collective, a communications firm in Baltimore, Maryland, which she joined in 2023.

== Early life and education ==
Dana Whitney White grew up in Charlottesville, Virginia. Her grandfather, Randolph Lewis White (1896–1991), was a supervisor at the University of Virginia Hospital and founded the Charlottesville-Albemarle Tribune, a weekly newspaper for the city's African American community; she has said she worked on the paper as a child. She graduated from the University of Chicago with a Bachelor of Arts in East Asian languages and civilizations and studied at Capital University of Economics and Business in Beijing and Hankuk University of Foreign Studies in Seoul.

== Career ==
=== Early career ===
White began her career in Washington, D.C., as deputy press secretary for the House Republican Conference until 2000, then spent a year as a publicist for Fox News Channel. At The Heritage Foundation she directed a program for correspondents from Asian news organizations, the Washington Roundtable for the Asia-Pacific Press. She was later Taiwan country director in the Office of the Secretary of Defense and an editorial writer for The Wall Street Journal in Hong Kong.

She was a foreign policy adviser on John McCain's 2008 presidential campaign and, from 2007 to 2011, a professional staff member on the Senate Armed Services Committee, covering several combatant commands and the Defense Security Cooperation Agency. She was director of policy and strategic communications for the Renault–Nissan Alliance (now the Renault–Nissan–Mitsubishi Alliance) in Paris from September 2012 to September 2015. In October 2015 she founded 1055 Grady LLC, a leadership and communications consultancy in Washington named for her grandfather's address in Charlottesville. During the 2016 presidential campaign she called Trump a "narcissist" and an "egomaniac" in television interviews.

=== Pentagon spokesperson ===
On April 5, 2017, White was appointed to the Senior Executive Service as assistant to the secretary of defense for public affairs, succeeding Peter Cook. She and Lieutenant General Kenneth F. McKenzie Jr., the director of the Joint Staff, gave the department's press briefings, including the one that followed the April 2018 strikes on Syria. Her last televised briefing was on May 31, 2018. In response to complaints about cancelled briefings, she told Politico that "our metric of success is whether the American public is informed with the facts, not whether reporters are always satisfied". Military Times later wrote that she had "frequently clashed with reporters".

In August 2018 CNN reported that the Department of Defense Office of Inspector General was investigating complaints from White's staff that she had them run personal errands and had transferred employees who complained. The inspector general's report, dated July 16, 2019, substantiated the allegation that she had misused subordinates' time for personal services, in violation of the Joint Ethics Regulation, and that she had accepted gifts from them, namely two rides in subordinates' cars and a pair of pantyhose. The services included buying train tickets, picking up dry cleaning and handling tax and mortgage paperwork. It did not substantiate a complaint that she had failed to treat subordinates with respect, or an allegation that her deputy, Charles Summers Jr., had failed to act on what staff told him; the reprisal complaints were addressed in a separate report. White told investigators that she had allowed but not asked for the services and had reimbursed her subordinates for the mileage and the pantyhose. Because she had left government, no personnel action could be taken, and the inspector general notified the Office of Personnel Management so that a record would be placed in her personnel file. In a statement White said the report had "unfairly maligned acts of kindness done in every office in the Pentagon" and that "every decision I made was to advance our mission and maximize our impact".

Mattis announced his resignation on December 20, 2018, and on December 31, his last day in office, White announced on Twitter that she was also leaving. Summers became acting assistant to the secretary of defense for public affairs the next day.

=== Later career ===
White joined Hyundai Motor North America in April 2020 as its first chief communications officer and left in November 2022. Ankura Consulting Group named her a senior managing director in March 2023, leading its strategic advisory practice in Washington. According to her LinkedIn profile, she left Ankura in November 2024 and has been managing partner of Juno Collective, a strategic communications firm in Baltimore, since September 2023.

== Boards and writing ==
White joined the board of directors of the International Republican Institute in July 2020. She has written for the Jewish quarterly Sapir, including a 2024 essay on historically Black colleges and universities and antisemitism. She is the founder of the Randolph L. White Foundation, named for her grandfather.

== Sources ==
This article incorporates text from a free content work. Licensed under CC0 1.0 (license statement/permission). Text taken from Dana W. White, Verified Handles contributors, Verified Handles. Archived copy of the entry at the Internet Archive, November 8, 2026.
