= Desmond Morris =

English zoologist, ethologist and artist (1928–2026)

Desmond Morris FLS hon. caus.
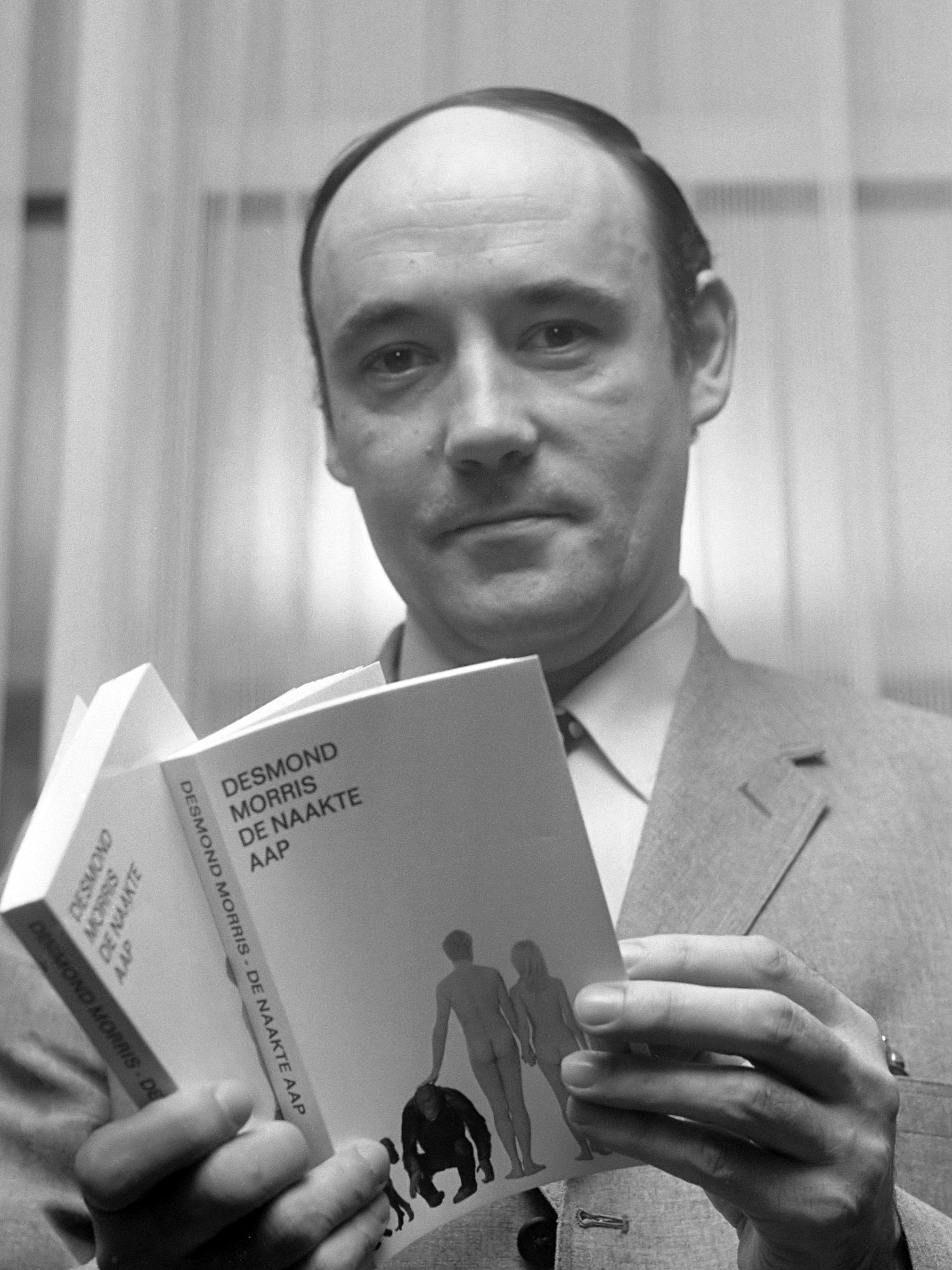
- Morris in 1969
- Born: Desmond John Morris; 24 January 1928; Purton, Wiltshire, England
- Died: 19 April 2026 (aged 98); Naas, County Kildare, Ireland
- Education: University of Birmingham; University of Oxford
- Occupations: Zoologist and ethologist
- Known for: The Naked Ape (1967)
- Spouse: Ramona Baulch (m. 1952; died 2018)
- Children: 1
- Scientific career
- Fields: Zoology
- Thesis: The reproductive behaviour of the ten-spined stickleback (1954)
- Doctoral advisor: Nikolaas Tinbergen

Desmond John Morris (24 January 1928 – 19 April 2026) was an English zoologist, ethologist and surrealist painter, as well as a popular author in human sociobiology. He was known for his 1967 book The Naked Ape, and for his television programmes such as Zoo Time.

== Early life and education ==
Desmond John Morris was born on 24 January 1928 in Purton, Wiltshire, to Marjorie (née Hunt) and children's fiction author Harry Morris. In 1933, the Morrises moved to Swindon where Desmond developed an interest in natural history and writing. He was educated at Dauntsey's School, a boarding school in Wiltshire.

In 1946, Morris joined the British Army for two years of national service, becoming a lecturer in fine arts at the Chiseldon Army College in Wiltshire. After being demobilised in 1948, he held his first one-man show of his own paintings at the Swindon Arts Centre, and studied zoology at the University of Birmingham. In 1950 he held a surrealist art exhibition with Joan Miró at the London Gallery. He held many other exhibitions in later years. Also in 1950, Morris wrote and directed two surrealist films, Time Flower and The Butterfly and the Pin. In 1951 he began a doctorate at the Department of Zoology, University of Oxford, in animal behaviour. In 1954, he earned a Doctor of Philosophy degree for his work on the reproductive behaviour of the ten-spined stickleback.

== Career ==
Morris stayed at Oxford, researching the reproductive behaviour of birds. In 1956 he moved to London as Head of the Granada Television and Film Unit for the Zoological Society of London, and studied the picture-making abilities of apes. The work included creating programmes for film and television on animal behaviour and other zoology topics. He hosted Granada TV's weekly Zoo Time programme until 1959, before returning shortly after in the 1960s, scripting and hosting 500 programmes, and 100 episodes of the show Life in the Animal World for BBC2.

In 1957, he organised an exhibition at the Institute of Contemporary Arts in London, showing paintings and drawings composed by common chimpanzees. In 1958, he co-organised an exhibition, The Lost Image, which compared pictures by infants, human adults, and apes, at the Royal Festival Hall in London. In 1959, he left Zoo Time to become the Zoological Society's Curator of Mammals. He returned to the programme in the 1960s. In 1964, he delivered the Royal Institution Christmas Lecture on Animal Behaviour. In 1967, he spent a year as executive director of the London Institute of Contemporary Arts.

Morris's books include The Naked Ape: A Zoologist's Study of the Human Animal, published in 1967. The book sold well enough for Morris to move to Malta in 1968 to write a sequel and other books. In 1973 he returned to Oxford to work for the ethologist Nikolaas Tinbergen. From 1973 to 1981, Morris was a Research Fellow at Wolfson College, Oxford. In 1979 he undertook a television series for Thames Television, The Human Race, followed in 1982 by Man Watching in Japan, The Animals Road Show in 1986 and then several other series. Morris wrote and presented the BBC documentary The Human Animal and its accompanying book in 1994. National Life Stories conducted an oral history interview (C1672/16) with Morris, in 2015, for its Science and Religion collection held by the British Library.

In 2022, in association with the Natural History Museum of Porto he published Watching which he described as not exactly an autobiography but 'a book about the joys of watching the world'.

Morris was a Fellow honoris causa of the Linnean Society of London.

Parallel to his academic and media career, Morris continued to create paintings in a Surrealist style. His art career spanned 70 years of his long life, though for decades his paintings were not widely known. However, gradually they featured in exhibitions and were bought by public galleries, including the Tate in London. In 2017, his paintings were the subject of a BBC Four documentary The Secret Surrealist. Morris continued to paint Surrealist artworks quite prolifically into his nineties.

== Personal life and death ==
Morris's father suffered lung damage in World War I, and died when Morris was 14. Morris's mother did not allow him to go to the funeral and he later said; "The grieving probably came later when I started to think about those bastards in Whitehall who had sent him off to die. It was the beginning of a lifelong hatred of the establishment. The church, the government and the military were all on my hate list and have remained there ever since." His great grandfather William Morris, an enthusiastic Victorian naturalist and founder of the Swindon local newspaper, greatly influenced him during his time living in Swindon.

During World War II, one of his girlfriends was Diana Fluck, who later became famous as actress Diana Dors, when she attended a nearly private school in Swindon. He used to take her aboard his rowing boat on the lake in his family's garden, and in 1946, when he was 18, he depicted her in an abstract painting Girl Selling Flowers, now in Museum & Art Swindon.

In July 1952, Morris married Ramona Baulch; they had one son, Jason. In 1978, Morris was elected vice-chairman of Oxford United football club. While a director of the club, he designed its ox-head badge based on a Minoan-style bull's head, which remains in use to this day.

Morris lived in the same house in North Oxford as the 19th-century lexicographer James Murray who worked on the Oxford English Dictionary. He exhibited at the Taurus Gallery in North Parade, Oxford, close to where he lived. He was the patron of the Friends of Swindon Museum and Art Gallery and gave a talk to launch the charity in 1993.

After the death of his wife in 2018 he lived with his son and family in Ireland.

Desmond Morris died in Naas, County Kildare, Ireland, on 19 April 2026, at the age of 98.

== Bibliography ==
=== Books ===
- The Biology of Art: a Study of the Picture-making Behaviour of the Great Apes and Its Relationship to Human Art. Alfred A. Knopf. 1963.
- The Big Cats (1965) – part of The Bodley Head Natural Science Picture Books, looking at the habits of the five Big Cats.
- The Mammals: A Guide to the Living Species (1965) – a listing of mammal genera, non-rodent non-bat species, and additional information on select species.
- Men and Snakes (1965) with Ramona Morris – an exploration of the various complex relationships between humans and snakes
- Men and Apes (1966) with Ramona Morris - an exploration of the relationship between man and the higher primates.
- Men and Pandas (1966) with Ramona Morris – third volume in the Ramona and Desmond Morris animal series.
- The Naked Ape: A Zoologist's Study of the Human Animal. New York: McGraw-Hill. 1967. – a look at the humanity's animalistic qualities and its similarity with other apes. In 2011, Time magazine placed it on its list of the 100 best or most influential non-fiction books written in English since 1923.
- The Human Zoo (1969) – a continuation of The Naked Ape, analysing human behaviour in big modern societies and their resemblance to animal behaviour in captivity.
- Patterns of Reproductive Behavior (1970)
- Intimate Behaviour (1971) – A study of the human side of intimate behaviour, examining how natural selection shaped human physical contact.
- Manwatching: A Field Guide to Human Behaviour (1978) – includes discussion of topic "Tie signs"
- Gestures: Their Origin and Distribution (1979)
- Animal Days (1979) - An autobiography covering Morris's early years up to 1966 when he was appointed Director of the ICA
- The Soccer Tribe (1981)
- Pocket Guide to Manwatching (1982)
- Inrock (1983) - Jonathan Cape
- Bodywatching – A Field Guide to the Human Species (1985)
- The Book of Ages: Who Did What When (1985)
- The Art of Ancient Cyprus (1985)
- Catwatching and Cat Lore (1986)
- Dogwatching (1986)
- Horsewatching (1989)
- Animalwatching (1990)
- Babywatching (1991)
- Christmas Watching (1992)
- Bodytalk (1994)
- The Human Animal (1994) – book and BBC documentary TV series
- The Human Sexes (1997) – Discovery/BBC documentary TV series
- Cat World: A Feline Encyclopedia (1997)
- The Secret Surrealist: The Paintings of Desmond Morris (1999)
- Body Guards: Protective Amulets and Charms (1999)
- The Naked Eye (2001)
- Dogs: The Ultimate Dictionary of over 1,000 Dog Breeds (2001)
- Peoplewatching: The Desmond Morris Guide to Body Language (2002)
- The Naked Woman: A Study of the Female Body (2004)
- Linguaggio muto (Dumb Language) (2004)
- The Nature of Happiness (2004)
- Watching (2006) – autobiography
- Fantastic Cats (2007)
- The Naked Man: A Study of the Male Body (2008)
- Baby: A Portrait of the First Two Years of Life (2008)
- Planet Ape (2009) (co-authored with [Steve Parker])
- Owl (2009) – Part of the Reaktion Books Animal series
- Inrock (2013) - Dark Windows Press. First illustrated edition of his fantasy novel for children
- The Artistic Ape (2013)
- Monkey (2013) – Part of the Reaktion Books Animal series
- Headworks (2014) - Dark Windows Press. The first juxtaposition of Morris's art with his poetic writings from 1945 to 2013.
- Leopard (2014) – Part of the Reaktion Books Animal series
- Bison (2015) – Part of the Reaktion Books Animal series
- 69 Surrealists (2017) - Dark Windows Press
- Cats in Art (2017) – Part of the Reaktion Books Animal series
- The Lives of the Surrealists (2018) - Thames & Hudson
- Bodyworks (2019) - Dark Windows Press
- Postures: Body Language in Art (2019) - Thames & Hudson
- Wordworks (2020) - Dark Windows Press
- Creatures of the Mind (2020) - Dark Windows Press
- The Surrealist Art of the Kuna (2020) - Dark Windows Press. A study of the indigenous art of the Guna People.
- Surrealist Familiars: Obscure Objects in the Artist's Studio (2020) - Dark Windows Press
- The Art of the Senufo Mudcloth (2021) - Dark Windows Press. A study of the art of the Senufo People.
- The British Surrealists (2022) - Thames & Hudson
- Oscar Mellor: Private Surrealist (2023) - Dark Windows Press. An illustrated biography of the surrealist artist Oscar Mellor.
- Biomorphia (2023) - Dark Windows Press. An illustrated catalogue of Morris's watercolour paintings from 2020-2023, Edited by Neil Coombs.
- Visual Magic: Tribal Surrealism Revisited (2023) - Dark Windows Press
- The Surrealist Gallery at DIVA (2024) - An illustrated guide to Morris's personal collection, permanently exhibited at the Dún Laoghaire Institute of Visual Arts (DIVA) in Ireland
- Metallic Surrealism: The Curious Art of the African Smiths (2024) - Dark Windows Press. An illustrated study of the work of artists from West Africa, particularly the Dogon People.
- Micro-Surrealism (2024) - Dark Windows Press. A catalogue of the 106 small watercolours produced by Morris between February and November 2024.
- 101 Surrealists (2024) - Thames & Hudson
- Proto Surrealism (2025) - Dark Windows Press. An exploration of the precursors of surrealism in the work of 16th Century illustrations such as the work of Konrad Gesner.
- A Surrealist Alphabet (2025) - Dark Windows Press
- The Surrealist Menagerie (2026) - Thames & Hudson

=== Book reviews ===
Year	Review article	Work(s) reviewed
1994	"CATS". The New York Review of Books. 41 (18): 16–17. 3 November 1994.	Thomas, Elizabeth Marshall (1994). The Tribe of Tiger: Cats and Their Culture. Simon and Schuster. ISBN 978-0671799656.

== Filmography ==
- Time Flower (1950)
- The Butterfly and the Pin (1950)
- Zootime (Weekly, 1956–1967)
- Life (1965–1967)
- The Human Race (1982)
- The Animals Roadshow (1987–1989)
- The Animal Contract (1989)
- Animal Country (1991–1996)
- The Human Animal (1994)
- The Human Sexes (1997)

== Criticism ==
Some of Morris's theories have been criticised as untestable. For instance, geneticist Adam Rutherford, writing about Morris's suggestion in The Naked Ape that women wear lipstick to make their lips look like aroused labia, says Morris commits "the scientific sin of the 'just-so' story – speculation that sounds appealing but cannot be tested or is devoid of evidence". Rutherford describes The Naked Ape as "scientifically questionable".

Morris was also criticised for suggesting that gender roles have an evolutionary rather than a purely cultural background.

== Sources ==
- Rutherford, Adam (2019). Humanimal: How Homo sapiens Became Nature's Most Paradoxical Creature – A New Evolutionary History. The Experiment. ISBN 978-1615195312. Archived from the original on 18 August 2021.
