= North West England =

Region of England

- Region
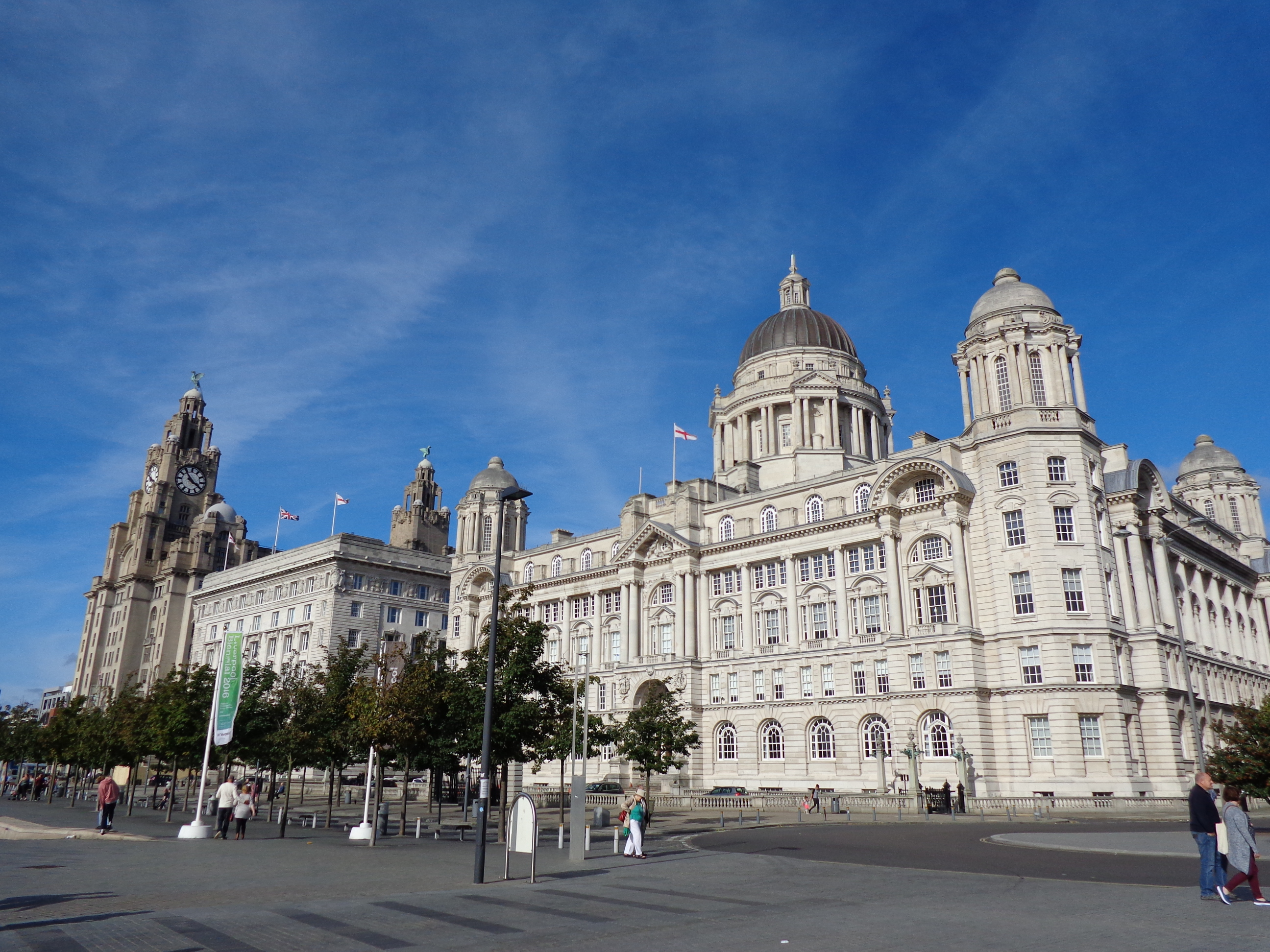
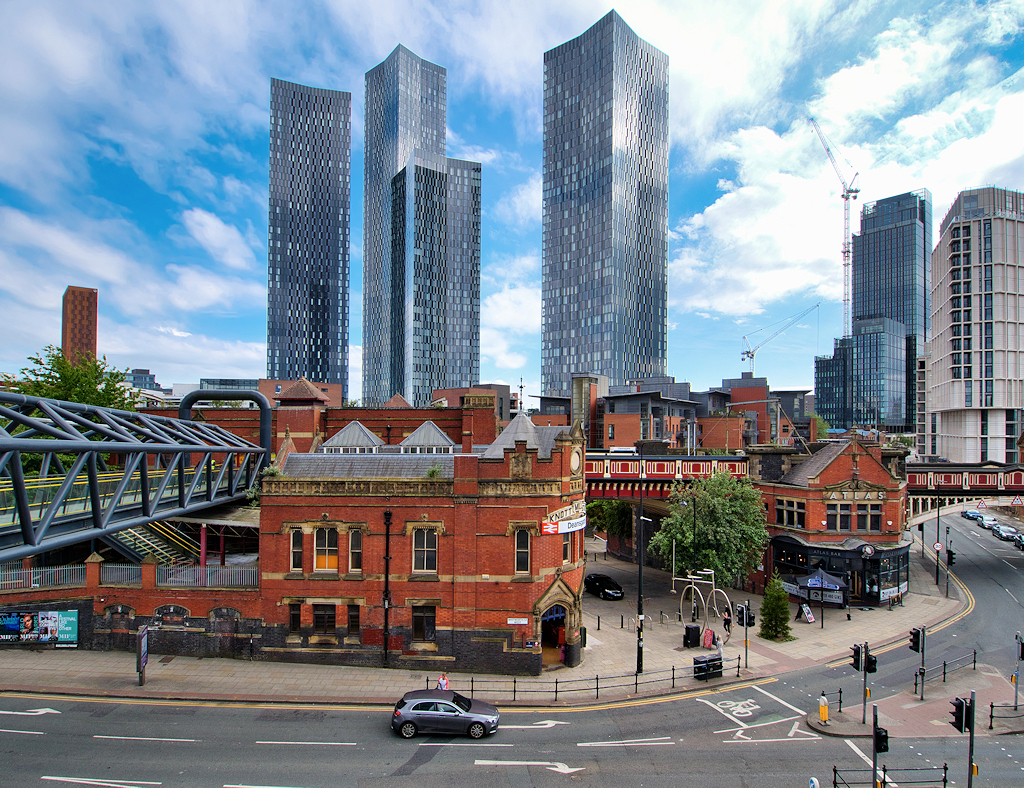
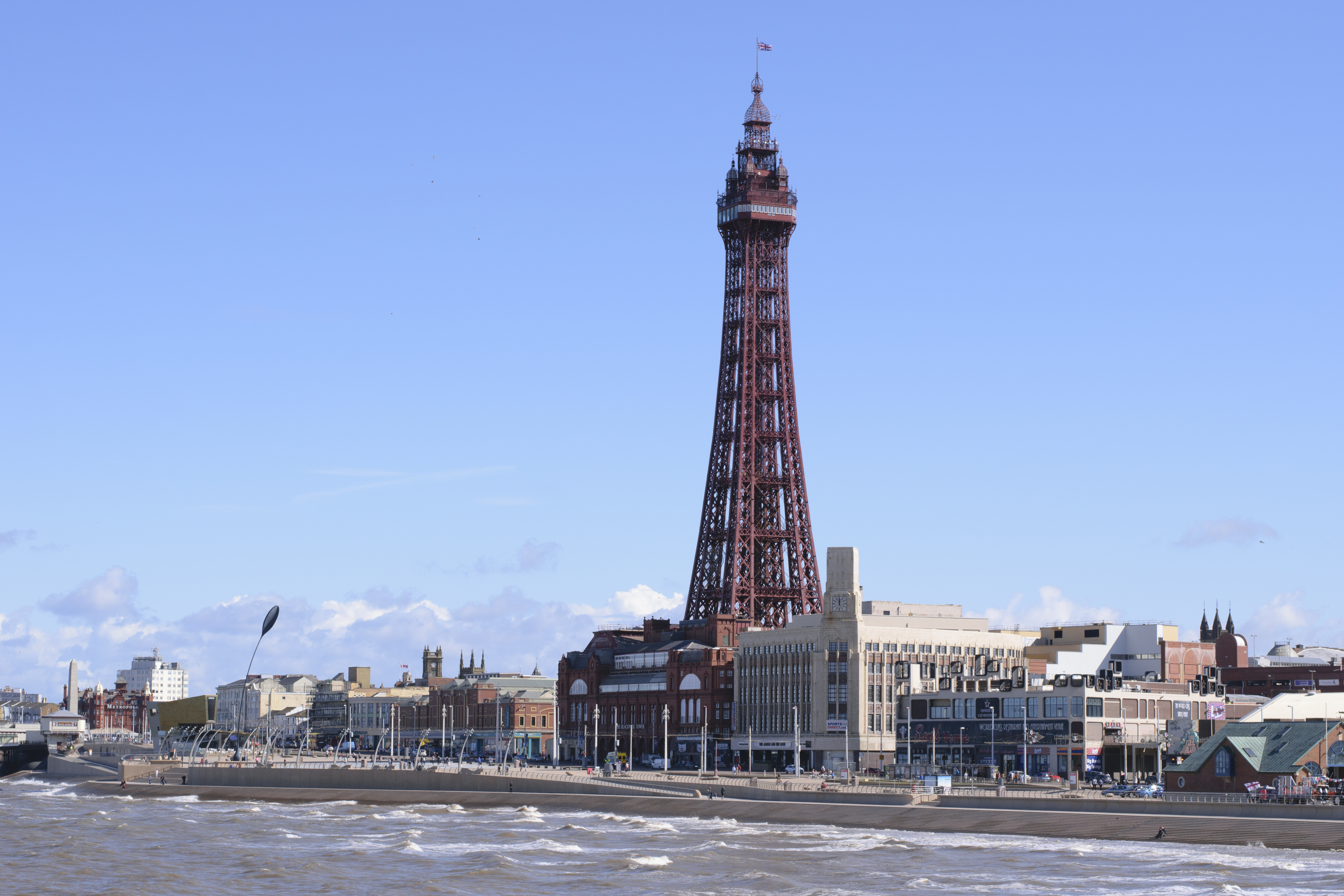
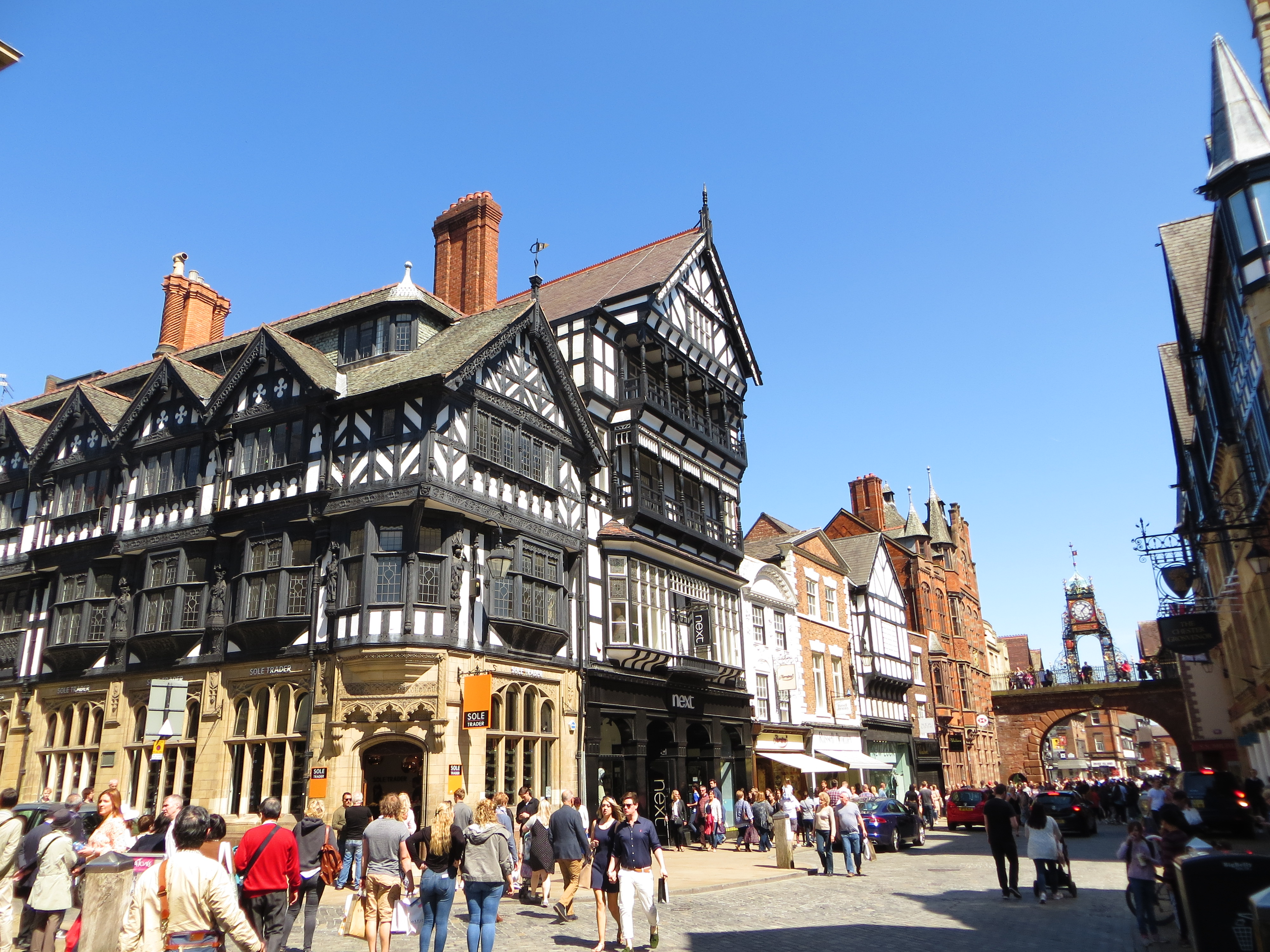
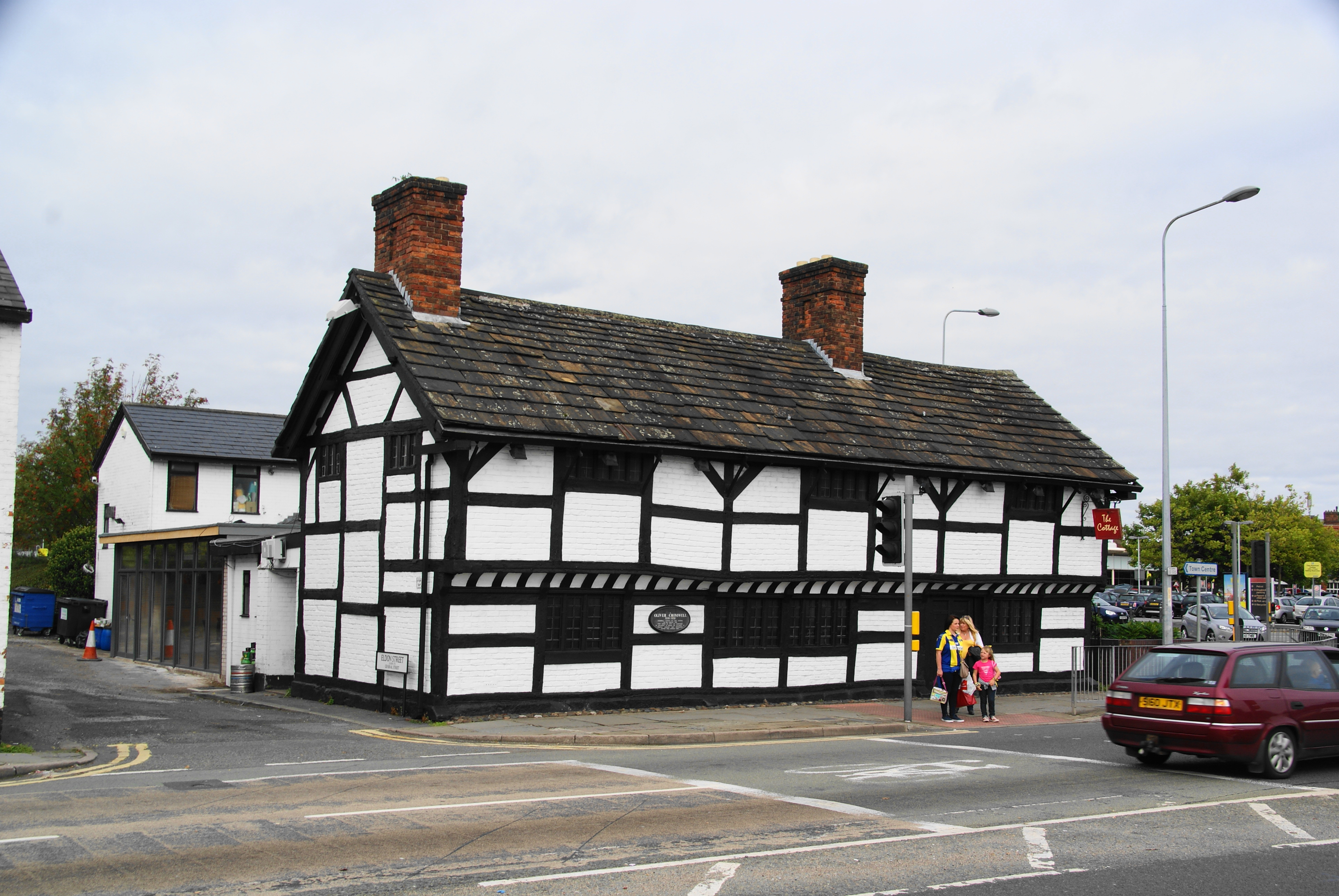
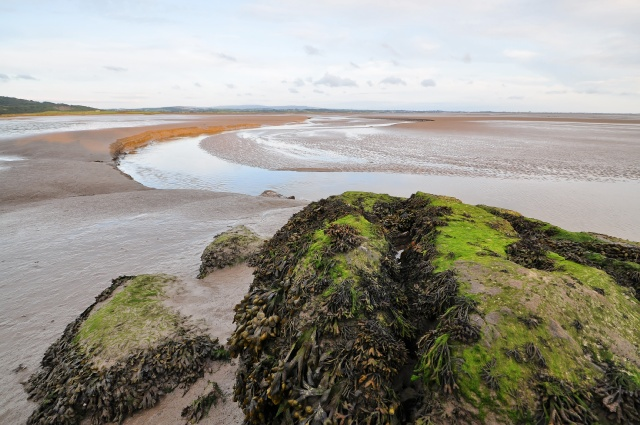
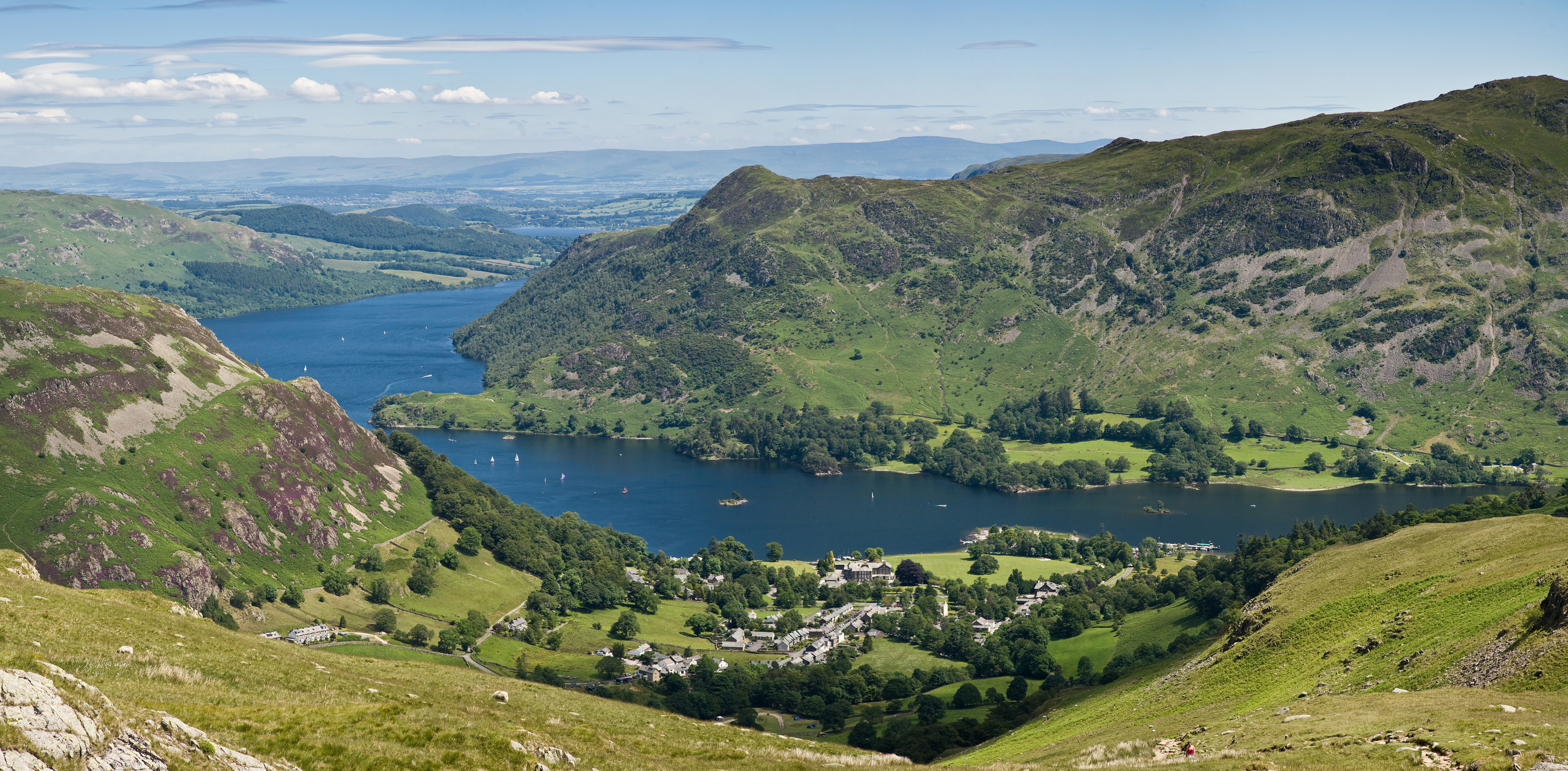
- From top, left to right: Liverpool; Manchester; Blackpool; Chester; Warrington; Morecambe Bay; Lake District

- North West region shown within England
- Coordinates: 54°04′30″N 02°45′00″W
- Sovereign state: United Kingdom
- Country: England
- GO established: 1994
- RDA established: 1998
- GO abolished: 2011
- RDA abolished: 31 March 2012
- Subdivisions: 5 counties: Cheshire; Cumbria; Greater Manchester; Lancashire; Merseyside; 3 combined authorities: Lancashire CCA; Greater Manchester; Liverpool City Region; 35 districts: 8 unitary; 15 metropolitan; 12 non-metropolitan in 1 non-metropolitan county

Government
  - Type: Local authority leaders' board
  - Body: North West Regional Leaders Board
  - MPs: 73 MPs (of 650)

Area
  - Total: 5,759 sq mi (14,915 km^{2})
  - Land: 5,447 sq mi (14,108 km^{2})
  - Rank: 6th

Population (2025)
  - Total: 7,772,854
  - Rank: 3rd
  - Density: 1,430/sq mi (551/km^{2})

Ethnicity (2021)
  - Ethnic groups: List: 85.6% White; 8.4% Asian; 2.3% Black; 2.2% Mixed; 1.5% other

Religion (2021)
  - Religion: List: 52.5% Christianity; 32.6% no religion; 7.6% Islam; 0.7% Hinduism; 0.4% Judaism; 0.3% Buddhism; 0.2% Sikhism; 0.4% other; 5.3% not stated
- Time zone: UTC+0 (GMT)
  - Summer (DST): UTC+1 (BST)
- ITL code: TLD
- GSS code: E12000002

North West England is one of nine official regions of England and consists of the ceremonial counties of Cheshire, Cumbria, Greater Manchester, Lancashire and Merseyside. The North West had a population of 7,417,397 in 2021. It is the third-most-populated region in the United Kingdom, after the South East and Greater London. The largest settlements are Manchester and Liverpool. It is one of the three regions, alongside North East England and Yorkshire and the Humber, that make up Northern England.

== Subdivisions ==
The official region consists of the following subdivisions:

Authority		County	
Local	Strategic	Ceremonial	Historic
Cumberland†	Cumbria	Cumbria	Cumberland
Westmorland and Furness†	Cumbria	Cumbria	Westmorland, Lancashire, Cumberland & Yorkshire
Blackpool†, Blackburn with Darwen†, Burnley, West Lancashire, Chorley, South Ribble, Fylde, Preston, Wyre, Lancaster, Rossendale & Hyndburn	Lancashire	Lancashire	Lancashire
Ribble Valley, Pendle	Lancashire	Lancashire	Lancashire & Yorkshire
Oldham	Greater Manchester	Greater Manchester*	Lancashire & Yorkshire
Manchester, Stockport & Trafford	Greater Manchester	Greater Manchester*	Lancashire & Cheshire
Tameside	Greater Manchester	Greater Manchester*	Lancashire, Cheshire & Yorkshire
Bolton, Bury, Rochdale, Salford & Wigan	Greater Manchester	Greater Manchester*	Lancashire
Knowsley, Liverpool, St Helens & Sefton	Liverpool City Region	Merseyside*	Lancashire
Wirral	Liverpool City Region	Merseyside*	Cheshire
Halton†	Liverpool City Region	Cheshire	Lancashire & Cheshire
Warrington†	Cheshire and Warrington	Cheshire	Lancashire & Cheshire
Cheshire East†, Cheshire West & Chester†	Cheshire and Warrington	Cheshire	Cheshire

- * Metropolitan county
- † Unitary authorities

After abolition of the Greater Manchester and Merseyside County Councils in 1986, power was transferred to the metropolitan boroughs, making them equivalent to unitary authorities.

== Geography ==
Geographic features of the North West

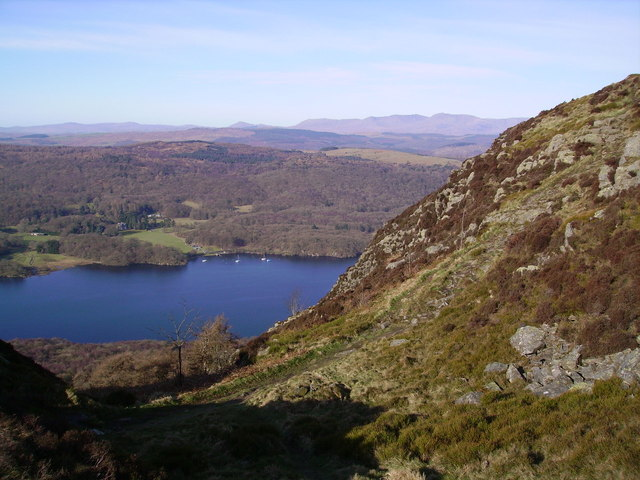
Windermere, Lake District

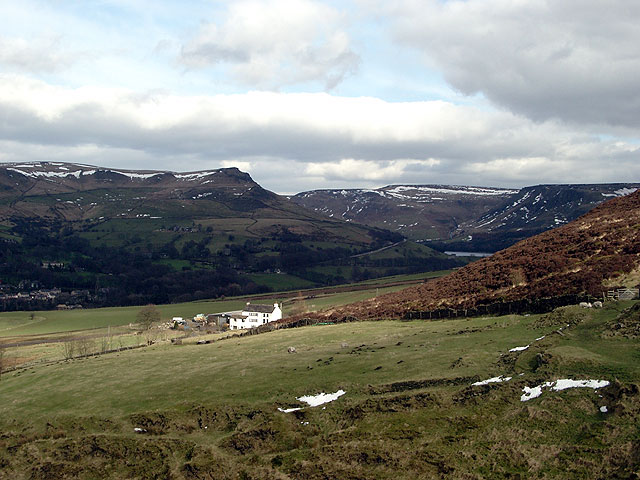
Saddleworth, Peak District

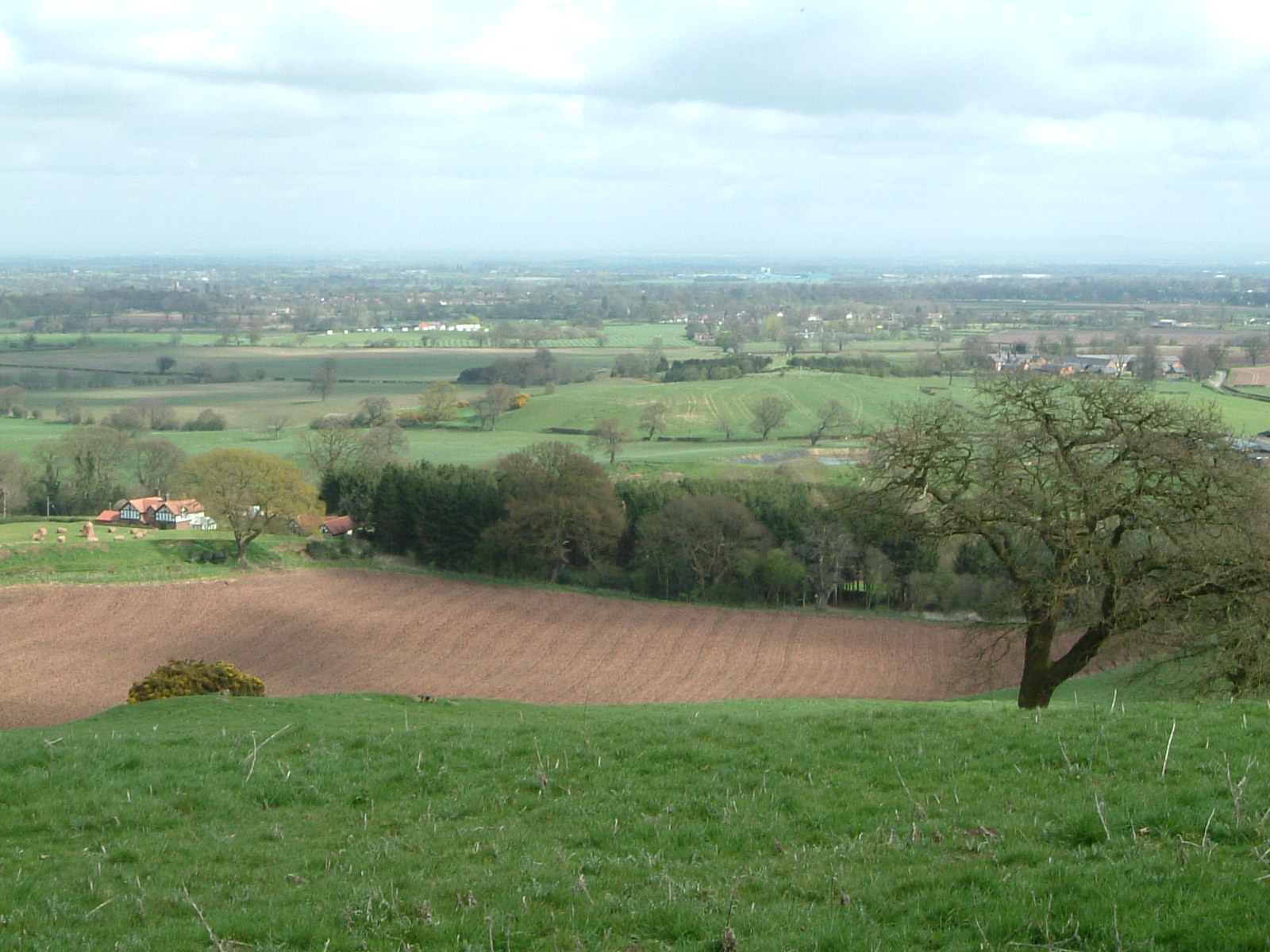
Cheshire Plain

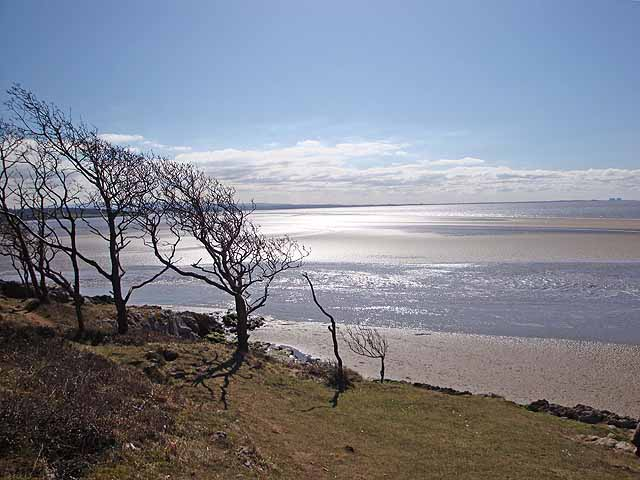
Morecambe Bay

North West England is bounded to the east by the Pennines and to the west by the Irish Sea. The region extends from the Scottish Borders in the north to the West Midlands region in the south. To its southwest is North Wales. Amongst the better known of the North West's physiographical features are the Lake District and the Cheshire Plain. The highest point in North West England (and the highest peak in England) is Scafell Pike, Cumbria, at a height of 3,209 ft (978 m).

Windermere is the largest natural lake in England, while Broad Crag Tarn on Broad Crag is England's highest lake. Wast Water is England's deepest lake, being 74 metres deep.

A mix of rural and urban landscape, two large conurbations, centred on Liverpool and Manchester, occupy much of the south of the region. The north of the region, comprising Cumbria and northern Lancashire, is largely rural, as is the far south which encompasses parts of the Cheshire Plain and Peak District.

The region includes parts of three National parks (all of the Lake District, and small parts of the Peak District and the Yorkshire Dales) and three areas of Areas of Outstanding Natural Beauty (all of Arnside and Silverdale and the Solway Coast, and almost all of the Forest of Bowland).

=== Weather ===
Weather in this part of England is typically classified as maritime, moist and temperate, with a moderate annual temperature range. Average annual precipitation in the UK typically ranges from approximately 800 mm to 1,400 mm. Temperatures are generally close to the national average. Cumbria usually experiences the most severe weather, with high precipitation in the mountainous regions of the Lake District and Pennines. In winter, the most severe weather occurs in the more exposed and elevated areas of the North West, once again mainly the Lake District and Pennine areas.

== Demographics ==
Relative population map.

Total North West England population (wikidata:Q47967) = 7,341,196 (2019 estimation)
(WD = Wikidata page)

[Hide/show county populations]
	North West England	pop.
1	Cheshire	1,069,646^{WD}
2	Cumbria	499,781^{WD}
3	Greater Manchester	2,867,800^{WD}
4	Lancashire	1,515,487^{WD}
5	Merseyside	1,434,256^{WD}

Population pyramid in 2020

=== Population, density, and settlements ===
Source: Office for National Statistics Mid Year Population Estimates in 2008

Region/County	Population	Population Density	Largest town/city	Largest urban area
Greater Manchester	2,629,400	2,016/km^{2}	Manchester (510,700) (2012 est.)	Greater Manchester Urban Area (2,240,230)
Lancashire	1,449,600	468/km^{2}	Blackpool (147,663)	Preston/Chorley/Leyland Urban Area (335,000)
Merseyside	1,353,600	2,118/km^{2}	Liverpool (491,500)	Liverpool Urban Area (816,000)
Cheshire	1,003,600	424/km^{2}	Warrington (202,228)	Warrington (202,228)
Cumbria	496,200	73/km^{2}	Carlisle (71,773)	Carlisle (71,773)

North West England's population accounts for just over 13% of England's overall population. 37.86% of the North West's population resides in Greater Manchester, 21.39% in Lancashire, 20.30% in Merseyside, 14.76% in Cheshire and 7.41% live in the largest county by area, Cumbria.

=== Ethnicity ===
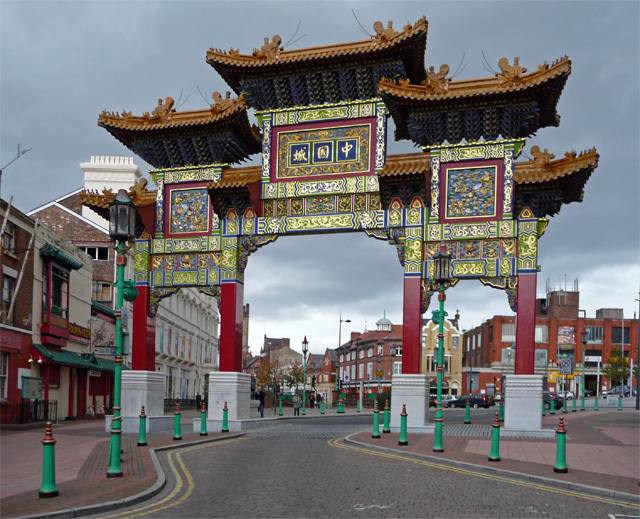
Liverpool Chinatown is the oldest Chinese community in Europe.

According to 2009 Office for National Statistics estimates, 91.6% (6,323,300) of people in the region describe themselves as 'White': 88.4% (6,101,100) White British, 1.0% (67,200) White Irish and 2.2% (155,000) White Other. During the Industrial Revolution hundreds of thousands of Welsh people migrated to the North West of England to work in the coal mines. Parts with notably high populations with Welsh ancestry as a result of this include Liverpool, Chester, Skelmersdale, Widnes, Halewood, Wallasey, Ashton-in-Makerfield and Birkenhead.

The Mixed Race population makes up 1.3% (93,800) of the region's population. There are 323,800 South Asians, making up 4.7% of the population, and 1.1% Black (80,600). 0.6% of the population (39,900) are Chinese and 0.5% (36,500) of people belong to another ethnic group.

North West England is a very diverse region, with Manchester and Liverpool amongst the most diverse cities in Europe. 19.4% of Blackburn with Darwen's population are Muslim, the third-highest among all local authorities in the United Kingdom and the highest outside London. Areas such as Moss Side in Greater Manchester are home to a 30%+ Black British population. In contrast, the town of St. Helens in Merseyside, unusually for a city area, has a very low percentage of ethnic minorities with 98% identifying as White British. The City of Liverpool, over 800 years old, is one of the few places in Britain where ethnic minority populations can be traced back over dozens of generations: being the closest major city in England to Ireland, it is home to a significant ethnic Irish population, with the city being home to one of the first ever Afro-Caribbean communities in the UK, as well as the oldest Chinatown in Europe.

Ethnic group	Year											
Ethnic group	1971 estimations		1981 estimations		1991		2001		2011		2021	
Ethnic group	Number	%	Number	%	Number	%	Number	%	Number	%	Number	%
White: Total	–	98.7%	6,580,840	97.5%	6,480,131	96.3%	6,355,495	94.43%	6,361,716	90.2%	6,347,394	85.6%
White: British	–	–	–	–	–	–	6,203,043	92.17%	6,141,069	87%	6,019,385	81.2%
White: Irish	–	–	–	–	–	–	77,499		64,930		61,422	0.8%
White: Irish Traveller/Gypsy	–	–	–	–	–	–	–	–	4,147	–	5,741	0.1%
White: Roma	–	–	–	–	–	–	–	–	–	–	7,359	0.1%
White: Other	–	–	–	–	–	–	74,953		151,570		253,487	3.4%
Asian or Asian British: Total	–	–	–	–	174,878	2.6%	256,762	3.81%	437,485	6.2%	622,685	8.4%
Asian or Asian British: Indian	–	–	–	–	55,823		72,219		107,353		140,413	1.9%
Asian or Asian British: Pakistani	–	–	–	–	77,150		116,968		189,436		303,611	4.1%
Asian or Asian British: Bangladeshi	–	–	–	–	15,016		26,003		45,897		60,859	0.8%
Asian or Asian British: Chinese	–	–	–	–	17,803		26,887		48,049		54,051	0.7%
Asian or Asian British: Asian Other	–	–	–	–	9,086		14,685		46,750		63,751	0.9%
Black or Black British: Total	–	–	–	–	47,478	0.7%	41,637	0.61%	97,869	1.38%	173,918	2.3%
Black or Black British: African	–	–	–	–	9,417		15,912		59,278		126,608	1.7%
Black or Black British: Caribbean	–	–	–	–	21,763		20,422		23,131		25,919	0.3%
Black or Black British: Other	–	–	–	–	16,298		5,303		15,460		21,391	0.3%
Mixed: Total	–	–	–	–	–	–	62,539	0.92%	110,891	1.57%	163,245	2.1%
Mixed: White and Caribbean	–	–	–	–	–	–	22,119		39,204		46,962	0.6%
Mixed: White and African	–	–	–	–	–	–	9,853		18,392		30,011	0.4%
Mixed: White and Asian	–	–	–	–	–	–	17,223		30,529		47,829	0.6%
Mixed: Other Mixed	–	–	–	–	–	–	13,344		22,766		38,443	0.5%
Other: Total	–	–	–	–	24,373	0.4%	13,331	0.19%	44,216	0.62%	110,156	1.5%
Other: Arab	–	–	–	–	–	–	–	–	24,528		43,865	0.6%
Other: Any other ethnic group	–	–	–	–	24,373	0.4%	13,331	0.19%	19,688		66,291	0.9%
Non-White: Total	–	1.3%	168,695	2.5%	246,729	3.7%	374,269	5.6%	690,461	9.8%	1,070,004	14.4%
Total	–	100%	6,749,535	100%	6,726,860	100%	6,729,764	100%	7,052,177	100%	7,417,398	100%

=== Place of birth ===
The table below is not how many people belong to each ethnic group (e.g. a BBC News article in 2008 claimed there are over 25,000 ethnic Italians in Manchester alone whilst only 6,000 Italian-born people live in the North West). The proportion of people residing in North West England born outside the UK was 11.7% in 2021, compared with 8.2% in 2011 and 5.1% in 2001. Below are the fifteen largest overseas-born groups in the region according to the 2021 census, alongside the two previous censuses:

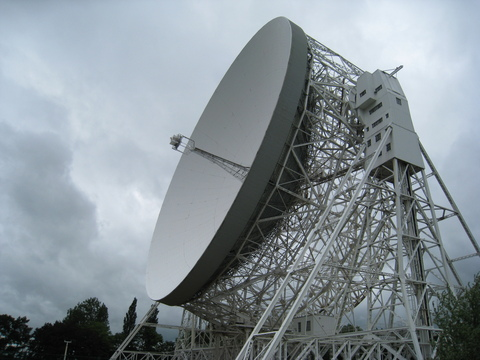
The Jodrell Bank Lovell 76-m radio telescope in Lower Withington, built in August 1957, is the world's third largest steerable telescope, and was the largest until 1971. It was designed by Sheffield's Sir Charles Husband and built of steel from Scunthorpe

Place of birth	2021	2011	2001
Pakistan	125,110	79,289	46,529
Poland	76,688	51,999	4,864
India	60,180	48,676	34,600
Ireland	38,379	48,456	56,887
Romania	33,918	3,052	484
Nigeria	29,092	13,903	3,011
Bangladesh	23,876	19,485	13,746
Italy	23,305	7,434	6,325
China	22,792	20,561	6,439
Germany	22,169	22,094	19,931
Spain	17,237	5,673	3,473
Iran	14,724	8,436	3,473
South Africa	12,981	10,500	7,740
Hong Kong	12,770	9,692	9,052
United States	10,995	9,028	7,037
Overall – all overseas-born	865,445	577,232	341,593

=== Religion ===
Religion in North West England
Religion	2021		2011		2001	
Religion	Number	%	Number	%	Number	%
Christianity	3,895,779	52.5%	4,742,860	67.3%	5,249,686	78.0%
Islam	563,105	7.6%	356,458	5.1%	204,261	3.0%
Hinduism	49,749	0.7%	38,259	0.5%	27,211	0.4%
Judaism	33,285	0.4%	30,417	0.4%	27,974	0.4%
Buddhism	23,028	0.3%	20,695	0.3%	11,794	0.2%
Sikhism	11,862	0.2%	8,857	0.1%	6,487	0.1%
Other religion	28,103	0.4%	19,166	0.3%	10,625	0.2%
No religion	2,419,624	32.6%	1,397,916	19.8%	705,045	10.5%
Religion not stated	392,862	5.3%	437,549	6.2%	486,681	7.2%
Total population	7,417,397	100%	7,052,177	100%	6,729,764	100%

One in five of the population in the North West is Catholic, a result of large-scale Irish emigration in the nineteenth century as well as the high number of English recusants in Lancashire.

=== Social deprivation ===
Of the nine regions of England, the North West has the fourth-highest GVA per capita—the highest outside southern England. Despite this the region has above average multiple deprivation with wealth heavily concentrated on very affluent areas like rural Cheshire, rural Lancashire, and south Cumbria. As measured by the Indices of deprivation 2007, the region has many more Lower Layer Super Output Areas in the 20% most deprived districts than the 20% least deprived council districts. Only North East England shows more indicators of deprivation than the North West, but the number of affluent areas in the North West is very similar to Yorkshire and the Humber.

The most deprived local authority areas in the region (based on specific wards within those borough areas) are, in descending order—Liverpool, Manchester, Knowsley, Blackpool, Salford, Blackburn with Darwen, Burnley, Rochdale, Barrow-in-Furness, Halton, Hyndburn, Oldham, Pendle, St Helens, Preston, Bolton, Tameside, Wirral, Wigan, Copeland, Sefton, and Rossendale.

In 2007 when Cheshire still had district councils, the least deprived council districts in the region by council district, in descending order, were—Congleton, Ribble Valley, Macclesfield, and South Lakeland. These areas have Conservative MPs, except South Lakeland has a Lib Dem and Labour MPs. At county level, before it was split into two, Cheshire was the least deprived, followed by Trafford, and by Warrington and Stockport.

In March 2011, the overall unemployment claimant count was 4.2% for the region. Inside the region the highest was Liverpool with 6.8%, followed by Knowsley on 6.3%, Halton with 5.5% and Rochdale with 5.1%. The lowest claimant count is in Eden (Cumbria) and Ribble Valley (Lancashire) each with 1.3%, followed by South Lakeland with 1.4%.

=== Elections ===
General election results in 2019

In the 2019 general election, the Conservatives gained ten seats, from the Labour Party, with no other seats changing hands. Labour held 42 of their 52 seats, albeit many with slimmed down majorities. They remain the dominant party in the region by seat count, with the Conservatives total now standing at 27. The Conservatives made two gains in Cheshire, three gains in Lancashire, five gains in Greater Manchester, notably including Andy Burnham's former seat of Leigh.

In the 2017 general election, the area was dominated by the Labour Party. Fifty-five per cent of the region's electorate voted Labour, 36.3% Conservative, 5.4% Liberal Democrat, 1.9% UKIP and 1.1% Greens; however, by number of parliamentary seats, Labour have 54, the Conservatives have 20, and the Liberal Democrats have 1. The Lib Dems' North West seat is in south Cumbria; Labour dominates Greater Manchester, and the Conservatives' vote is concentrated in affluent suburban areas such as Cheadle, Hazel Grove and Altrincham and Sale West. Labour seats also predominate in Merseyside. In Cheshire the 2015 result was reversed, with Labour winning seven seats and the Conservatives four, whilst Lancashire is competitive between Labour and Conservative (8 seats each); the Labour seats in Lancashire are concentrated in the south of the county along the M65. For the region, the Labour gained 3 seats; there was a 5.2% swing from Conservative to Labour.

In the 2015 general election, Liverpool Walton was the safest seat in the UK, with a 72% majority, and in 2017 this was repeated with a 77% majority for Dan Carden (Labour), when an astonishing 85.7% of the electorate voted for him (the Conservatives came second with 8.6%). In the by-election of 2012, Manchester Central has the record for the lowest turnout in the UK—18%. Gwyneth Dunwoody, for Crewe and Nantwich, was the longest serving female MP until her death in 2008.

In the final European Elections in the UK in 2019, 31.23% voted for the Brexit Party, with Labour polling 21.91%, the Liberal Democrats 17.15% and the Green Party 12.48%. The Conservatives came fifth in the region with 7.55% of votes cast.

=== Language and dialect ===
The earliest known language spoken in the North West was a dialect of the Brythonic language spoken across much of Britain from at least the Iron Age up to the arrival of English in the first millennium AD. Fragments of this early language are seen in the inscriptions and place names of the Roman era. In some parts of the region, the Brythonic dialect developed into the medieval language known today as Cumbric, which continued to be spoken perhaps as late as the 12th century in the north of Cumbria. This early Celtic heritage remains today in place names such as Carlisle, Penrith and Eccles, and many river names such as Cocker, Kent and Eden.

English may have been spoken in the North West from around the 7th century AD, when the Anglo-Saxon kingdom of Northumbria first appears to have made inroads west of the Pennines. The language at this time would have been the Northumbrian dialect of Old English. The region's high number of English place names like Manchester, Liverpool, Lancaster, Blackburn, and Preston suggests English became dominant over time, especially south of the Lake District. From the 9th to 11th centuries, Danes and Norsemen settled in the area, and their influence remains in the placenames and dialect of the North West, the only significant Norse settlement region in England. Elements like fell, thwaite and tarn, which are particularly common in Cumbria, are all Norse. The numerous Kirkbys and place names with "holm" and "dale" show the Scandinavian influence throughout the North West.

Through the Middle Ages the dialects of the North West would have been considerably different from those spoken in the Midlands and south. It was only with the spread of literacy (particularly with the publication of the King James Bible) that Standard English spread to the region. Even so, local dialects continued to be used and were relatively widespread until the 19th and 20th centuries.

In modern times, English is the most spoken language in the North West, with a large percentage of the population fluent in it, and close to 100% conversational in it. To the north-east of the region, within the historic boundaries of Cumberland, the Cumbrian dialect is dominant. The historical county of Lancashire covered a vast amount of land, and the Lancashire dialect and accent is still predominant throughout the county, and stretches as far north as Furness in South Cumbria to parts of north Greater Manchester and Merseyside in the south of the region. The region boasts some of the most distinctive accents in the form of the Scouse accent, which originates from Liverpool and its surrounding areas, and the Manc accent, deriving from the central Manchester district. Both of these descend from the Lancashire dialect but have some distinctions from it, especially Scouse. The region's accents are among those referred to as 'Northern English'.

Large immigrant populations in the North West result in the presence of significant immigrant languages. South Asian languages such as Urdu, Hindi and Punjabi are widespread, with the largest number of speakers residing in Preston, Blackburn and Manchester. The Chinese once made up the largest minority in the region (as Liverpool has one of the oldest Chinese settlements in Europe), and still do to the far north where Chinese is spoken by small but significant communities. Since the enlargement of the EU, over one million Poles have immigrated to the UK, a large number of them settling in the North West. Places such as Crewe as well as larger cities make Polish written information available for the public, to much controversy. Other immigrant languages with a presence in the North West are Spanish, mainly amongst the Latin American communities in Liverpool and Manchester, as well as various other Eastern European and Asian languages.

The most taught languages in schools across the North West are English, French and Spanish. German and Italian are available at more senior levels and, in cities such as Manchester and Liverpool, even Urdu and Mandarin are being taught to help maintain links between the local minority populations.

=== Eurostat NUTS ===
In the Eurostat Nomenclature of Territorial Units for Statistics (NUTS), North West is a level-1 NUTS region, coded "UKD", which (since 2015) is subdivided as follows:

NUTS 1	Code	NUTS 2	Code	NUTS 3	Code
North West	UKD	Cumbria	UKD1	West Cumbria (Allerdale, Barrow-in-Furness, Copeland)	UKD11
		Cumbria	UKD1	East Cumbria (Carlisle, Eden, South Lakeland)	UKD12
		Cheshire	UKD6	Warrington	UKD61
		Cheshire	UKD6	Cheshire East	UKD62
		Cheshire	UKD6	Cheshire West and Chester	UKD63
		Greater Manchester	UKD3	Manchester	UKD33
		Greater Manchester	UKD3	Greater Manchester South West (Salford and Trafford)	UKD34
		Greater Manchester	UKD3	Greater Manchester South East (Stockport and Tameside)	UKD35
		Greater Manchester	UKD3	Greater Manchester North West (Bolton and Wigan)	UKD36
		Greater Manchester	UKD3	Greater Manchester North East (Bury, Oldham and Rochdale)	UKD37
		Lancashire	UKD4	Blackburn with Darwen	UKD41
		Lancashire	UKD4	Blackpool	UKD42
		Lancashire	UKD4	Lancaster and Wyre	UKD44
		Lancashire	UKD4	Mid Lancashire (Fylde, Preston, Ribble Valley and South Ribble)	UKD45
		Lancashire	UKD4	East Lancashire (Burnley, Hyndburn, Pendle and Rossendale)	UKD46
		Lancashire	UKD4	Chorley and West Lancashire	UKD47
		Merseyside	UKD7	East Merseyside (Knowsley, St. Helens and Halton)	UKD71
		Merseyside	UKD7	Liverpool	UKD72
		Merseyside	UKD7	Sefton	UKD73
		Merseyside	UKD7	Wirral	UKD74

== Cities and towns ==
- GM=Greater Manchester
- ME=Merseyside
- CU=Cumbria
- LA=Lancashire
- CH=Cheshire

Population > 400,000

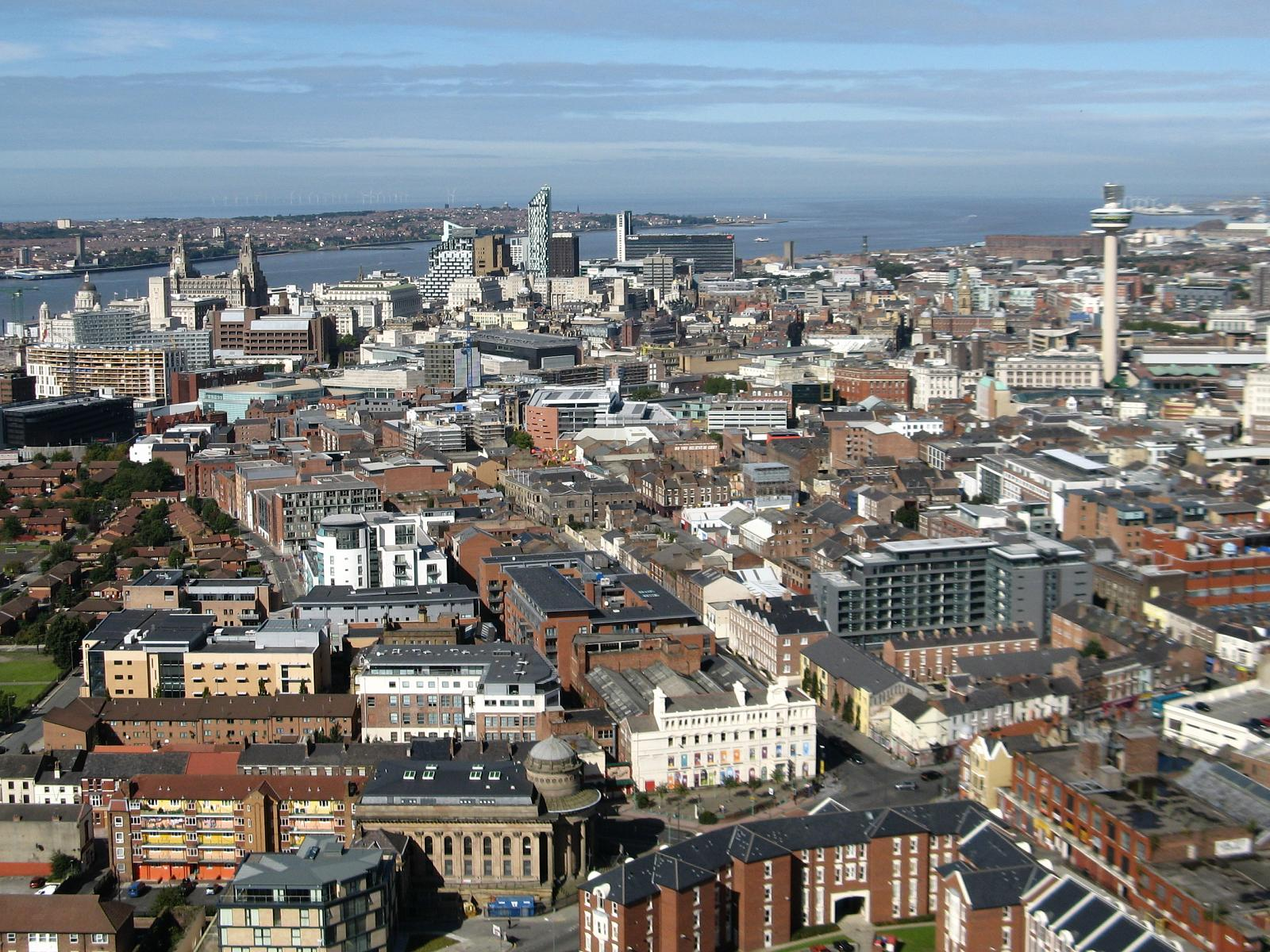
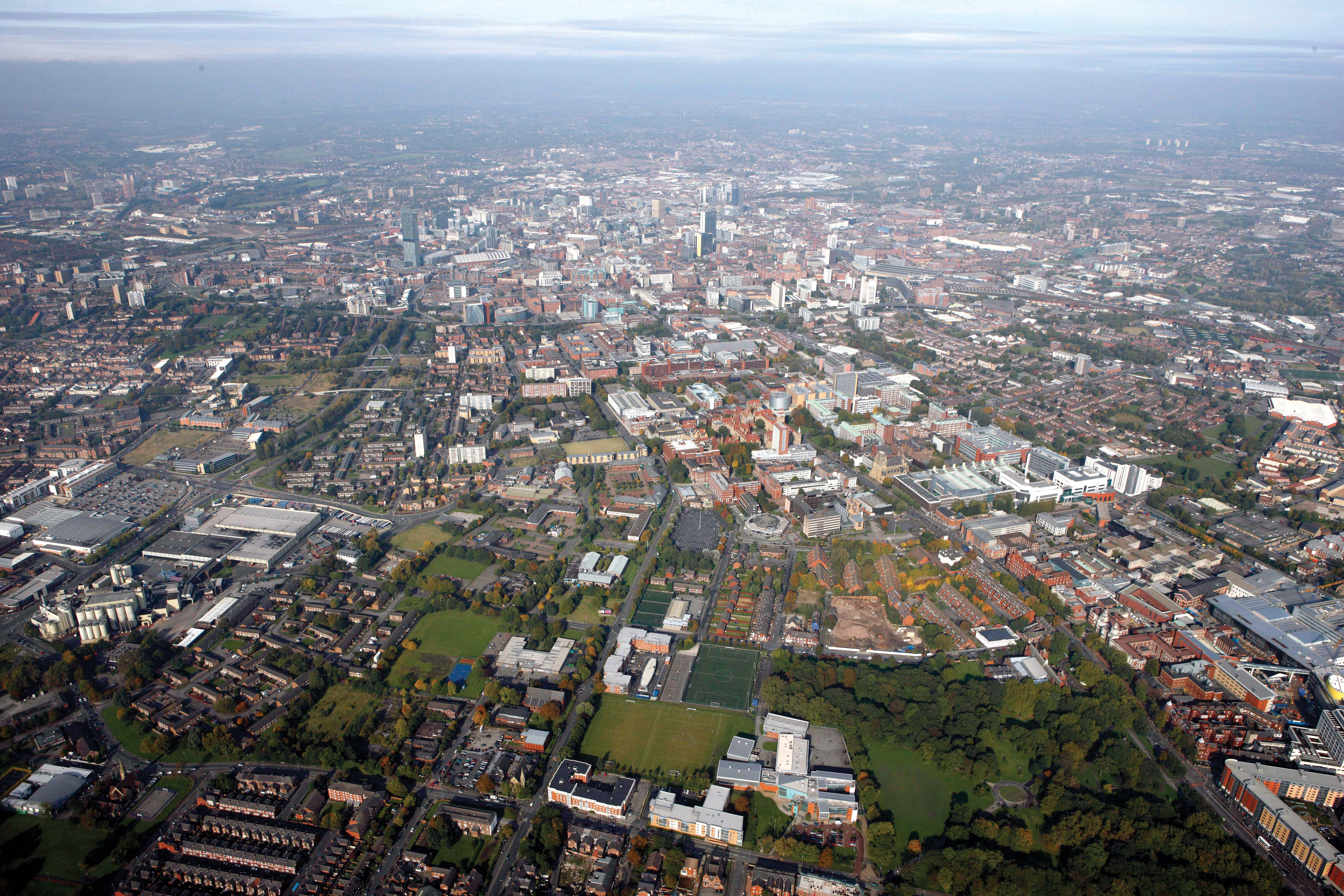
Liverpool City Centre and Manchester City Centre

- Manchester, GM
- Liverpool, ME

Population > 100,000

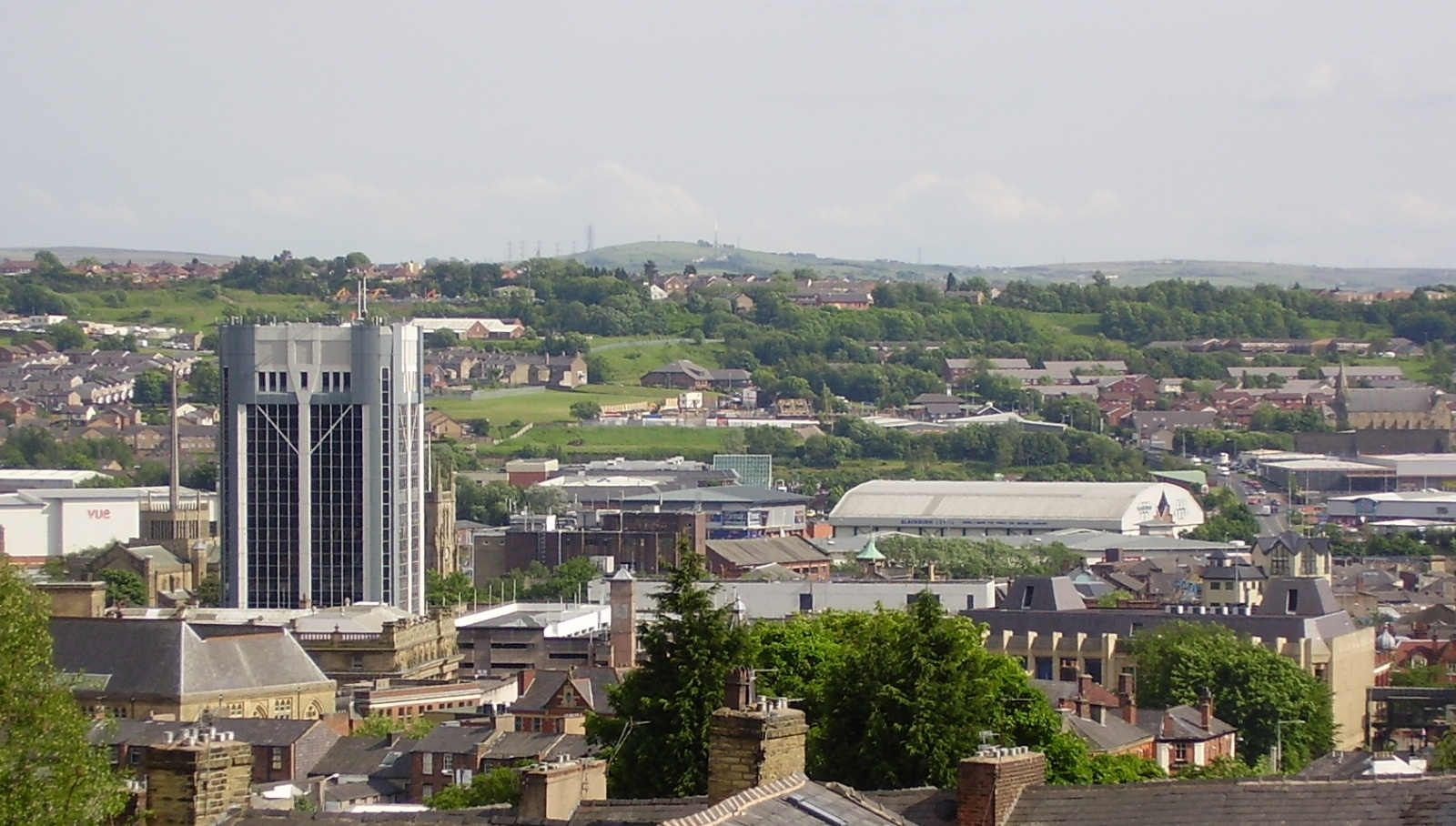
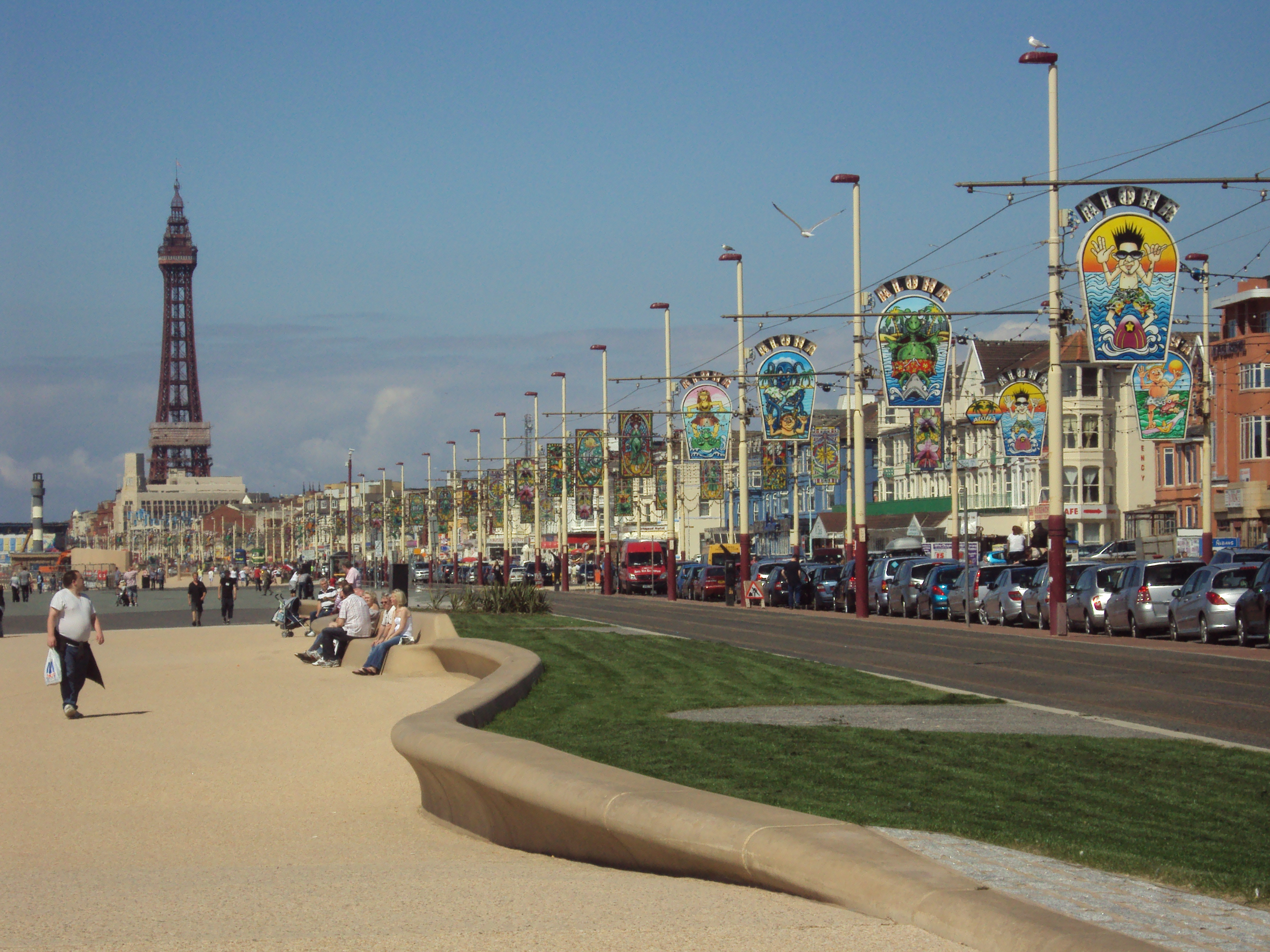
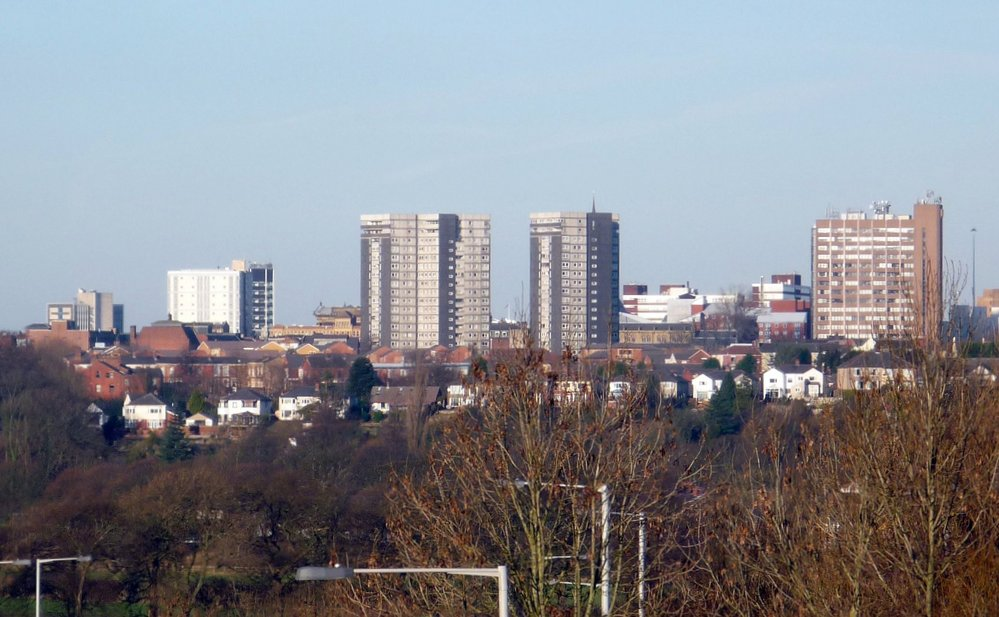
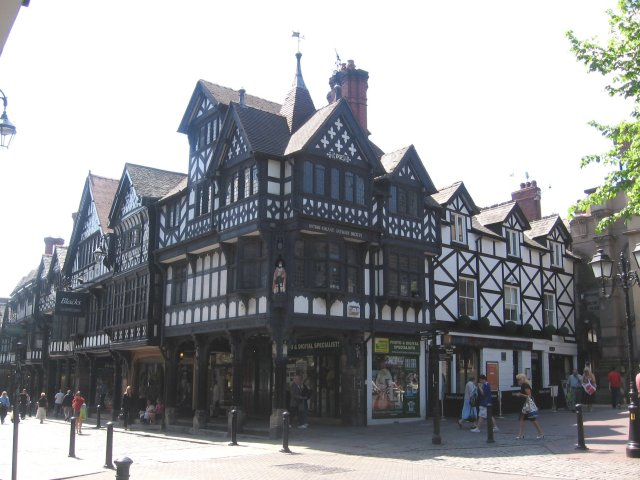
Blackburn town centre and Blackpool promenade
Preston and Chester city centres

- Warrington, CH
- Blackpool, LA
- Chester, CH
- Stockport, GM
- Sale, GM
- Bolton, GM
- Preston, LA
- Rochdale, GM
- Blackburn, LA
- Wigan, GM
- St. Helens, ME
- Wythenshawe, GM
- Salford, GM

Population > 70,000

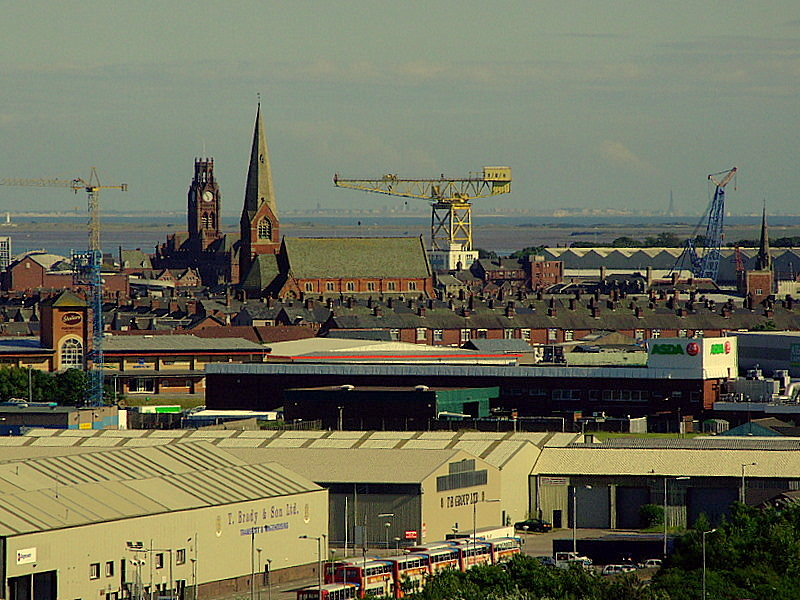
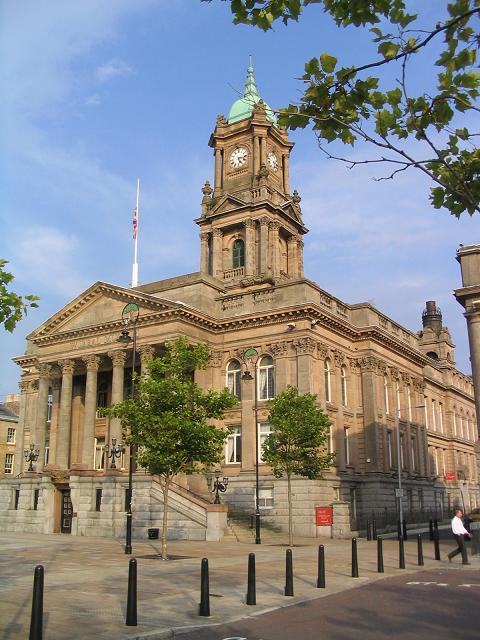
Barrow-in-Furness town centre and Birkenhead town hall

- Oldham, GM
- Southport, ME
- Birkenhead, ME
- Bury, GM
- Bootle, ME
- Carlisle, CU
- Northwich, CH
- Burnley, LA
- Barrow-in-Furness, CU
- Crewe, CH

Population > 50,000

- Runcorn, CH
- Widnes, CH
- Wallasey, ME
- Ellesmere Port, CH
- Altrincham, GM
- Macclesfield, CH
- Crosby, ME
- Leigh, GM

Population > 30,000

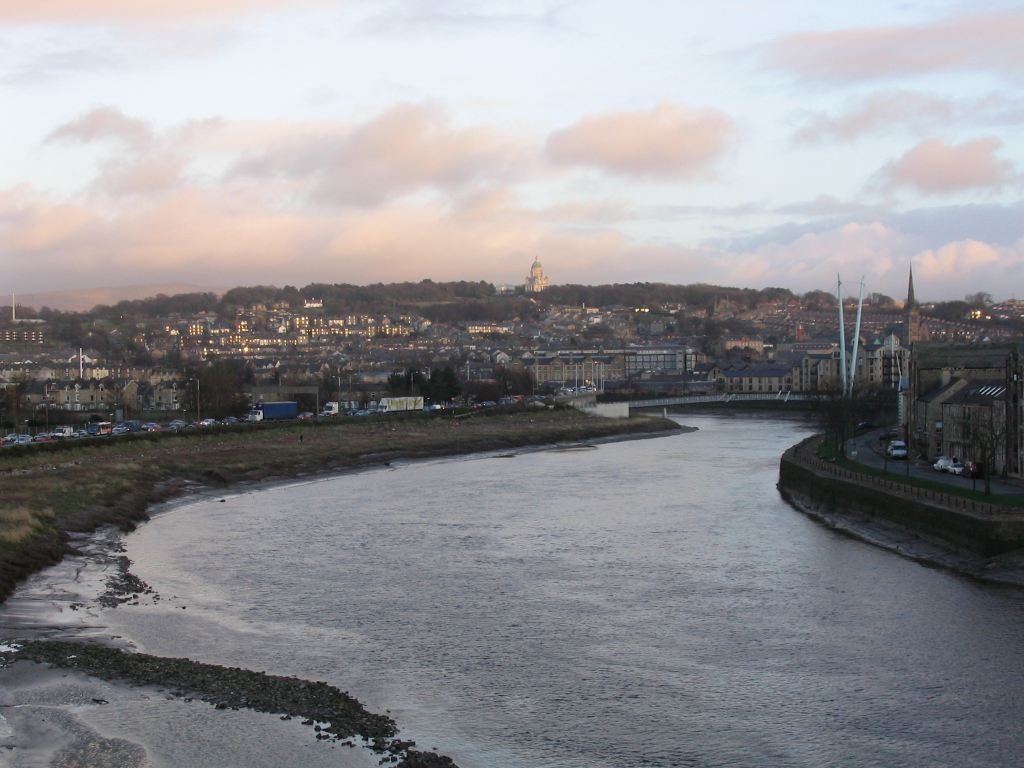
Lancaster city centre

- Accrington, LA
- Lancaster, LA
- Ashton-under-Lyne, GM
- Middleton, GM
- Lytham St Annes, LA
- Urmston, GM
- Kirkby, ME
- Skelmersdale, LA
- Eccles, GM
- Stretford, GM
- Denton, GM
- Leyland, LA
- Chadderton, GM
- Morecambe, LA
- Chorley, LA
- Hyde, GM
- Huyton, ME
- Thornton-Cleveleys, LA
- Prestwich, GM
- Saddleworth, GM
- Winsford, CH
- Farnworth, GM

Population > 20,000

- Radcliffe, GM
- Nelson, LA
- Ashton-in-Makerfield, GM
- Kendal, CU
- Heywood, GM
- Reddish, GM
- Darwen, LA
- Hindley, GM
- Cheadle Hulme, GM
- Fleetwood, LA
- Congleton, CH
- Swinton, GM
- Workington, CU
- South Turton, GM
- Westhoughton, GM
- Wilmslow, CH
- Ormskirk, LA
- Golborne, GM
- Whitehaven, CU
- Stalybridge, GM
- Marple, GM
- Whitefield, GM
- Droylsden, GM
- Penwortham, LA
- Formby, ME
- Litherland, ME
- Newton-le-Willows, ME
- Atherton, GM
- Rawtenstall, LA
- Royton, GM
- Walkden, GM
- Shaw and Crompton, GM
- Failsworth, GM
- Maghull, ME
- Halewood, ME
- Horwich, GM

Population > 10,000

- Alsager, CH
- Bramhall, GM
- Clitheroe, LA
- Colne, LA
- Dukinfield, GM
- Haslingden, LA
- Hazel Grove, GM
- Heysham, LA
- Irlam, GM
- Lowton, GM
- Maryport, CU
- Middlewich, CH
- Moreton, ME
- Nantwich, CH
- Neston, CH
- Pendlebury, GM
- Penrith, CU
- Poulton-le-Fylde, LA
- Ramsbottom, GM
- Romiley, GM
- Sandbach, CH
- Tyldesley, GM
- Ulverston, CU
- Upton, ME
- Woodley, GM

Population > 5,000

- Burscough, LA
- Carnforth, LA
- Cleator Moor, CU
- Cockermouth, CU
- Dalton-in-Furness, CU
- Frodsham, CH
- Gatley, GM
- Millom, CU
- Tarleton, LA
- Windermere, CU

=== Metropolitan areas ===
The five largest metropolitan areas in the North West are as follows:

- Greater Manchester metropolitan area – 2,556,000
- Liverpool/Birkenhead metropolitan area – 2,241,000
- Blackburn/Burnley – 391,000
- Preston – 354,000
- Blackpool −304,000

Liverpool and Manchester are sometimes considered parts of a single large polynuclear metropolitan area, or megalopolis but are usually treated as separate metropolitan areas. In some studies, part of Wigan in Greater Manchester is considered part of the Liverpool metropolitan area.

== Politics ==
The North West of England has historically been held by the Labour Party.

=== National politics ===
In the 2024 United Kingdom general election, the Labour Party won 65 of the North West's 73 constituencies.

=== Elected regional assembly ===
Proposed flag for the region designed by Peter Saville

It is one of the two regions (along with Yorkshire and the Humber) that were expected to hold a referendum on the establishment of an elected regional assembly. However, when the North East region of England rejected having an elected regional assembly in a referendum, further referendums were cancelled and the proposals for elected regional assemblies in England put on hold. The regional leaders' forum, 4NW is based on Waterside Drive in Wigan.

=== European Parliament ===
The former North West England European Parliament constituency had the same boundaries as the Region.

== History ==
Ten English regions were established by the government in 1994. At that time, Merseyside, which already had its own Government Office, formerly the Merseyside Task Force, was regarded as a separate region. In 1998, Merseyside was merged into the North West region. This action was controversial in some quarters. Regional Government Offices were abolished in April 2011 by the Coalition Government.

=== Scientific heritage ===
Sir Ernest Marsden (of Blackburn) and Hans Geiger conducted the Geiger–Marsden experiment at the University of Manchester in 1909, where the Geiger counter was invented, which demonstrated the existence of the atomic nucleus. Sir J. J. Thomson of Cheetham Hill discovered the electron (given its name in 1891 by George Johnstone Stoney) in April 1897 and received the Nobel Prize for Physics in 1906; his son George Paget Thomson would win the Nobel Prize for Physics 1937 for discovering electron diffraction (at the University of Aberdeen). John Dalton, from Cumbria and moved to Manchester, developed atomic theory. William Sturgeon of Lancashire invented the electromagnet in 1825.

Sydney Chapman, a mathematician from Eccles, in 1930 explained the ozone–oxygen cycle in the stratosphere, being the first to propose that atmospheric oxygen or ozone molecules absorb (harmful UVB and UVC) ultraviolet wavelengths of light in photolysis, to produce reactive single atoms which accumulate to form the ozone layer.

Graphene was discovered at the University of Manchester in 2004 under Andre Geim and Konstantin Novoselov.

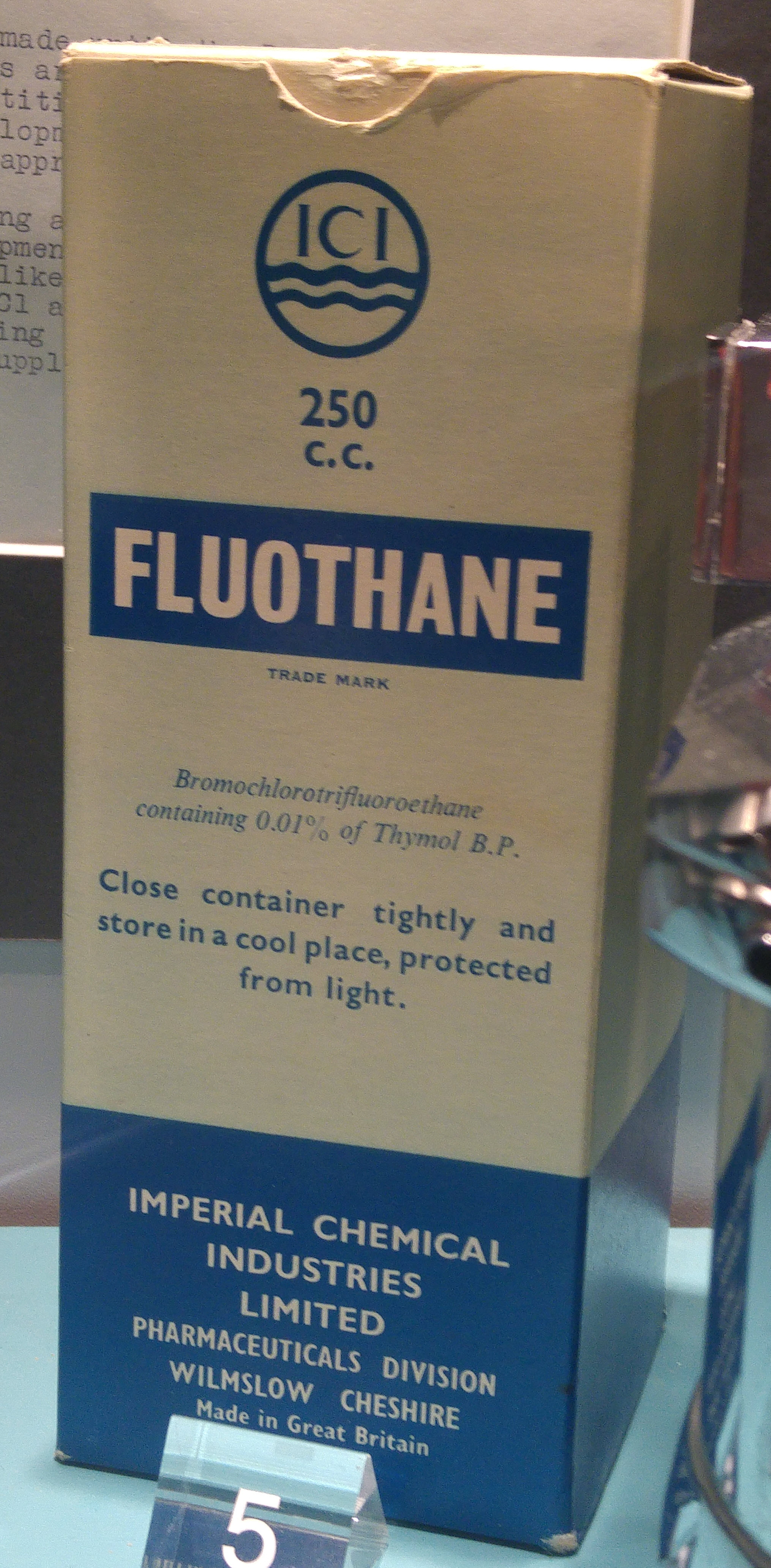
Exhibit of ICI's Fluothane (Halothane), discovered at Widnes, at Catalyst Science Discovery Centre, near Spike Island in Widnes

At the Calico Printers' Association in Manchester in 1941, John Rex Whinfield and James Tennant Dickson discovered polyethylene terephthalate, known as PET, a common polyester compound found in plastic bottles and food, and also known as Terylene or Dacron. Cheslene and Crepes of Macclesfield discovered crimplene, the fabric that is now referred to as polyester. ICI Dyestuffs at Hexagon House, in Blackley in north Manchester, discovered Procion dyes. At the Winnington Laboratory on 27 March 1933, Eric Fawcett and Reginald Gibson discovered polythene in an ICI laboratory in Northwich, when reacting benzaldehyde with ethene at a pressure of 2,000 atmospheres; the process was improved in 1935 by Michael Perrin.

Halothane, the world's first synthetic inhalation general anaesthetic gas, was discovered in 1951 at ICI's Widnes Laboratory by Wallasey's Charles Suckling, and first tested on a patient in Manchester in 1956; it works by binding to the GABA receptor. John Charnley of Bury invented the hip replacement in 1962 at Wrightington Hospital, Lancashire, north-west of Wigan. Clatterbridge Hospital in Bebington has a cyclotron (linear accelerator), and is the only hospital in the UK to offer proton therapy.

Alderley Park opened in October 1957, and ICI Pharmaceuticals was formed in the same year. In 1962 Dora Richardson of ICI discovered tamoxifen. ICI Alderley Park later discovered Anastrozole, Fulvestrant, Goserelin and Bicalutamide, later made by Zeneca. James Black discovered beta blockers—propranolol (Inderal) at Alderley Park in 1962. The Wellcome Foundation, a provider of much of Britain's medical research, was based from 1966 to 1997 at Crewe Hall in Crewe Green.

Clifford Cocks and James H. Ellis from Cheshire, with Malcolm J. Williamson, invented the RSA (algorithm) in 1973 at GCHQ, used for public-key cryptography. Richard Owen from Lancaster coined the word dinosaur in 1842, and he founded the Natural History Museum, London, opening in 1881.

=== Industrial heritage ===
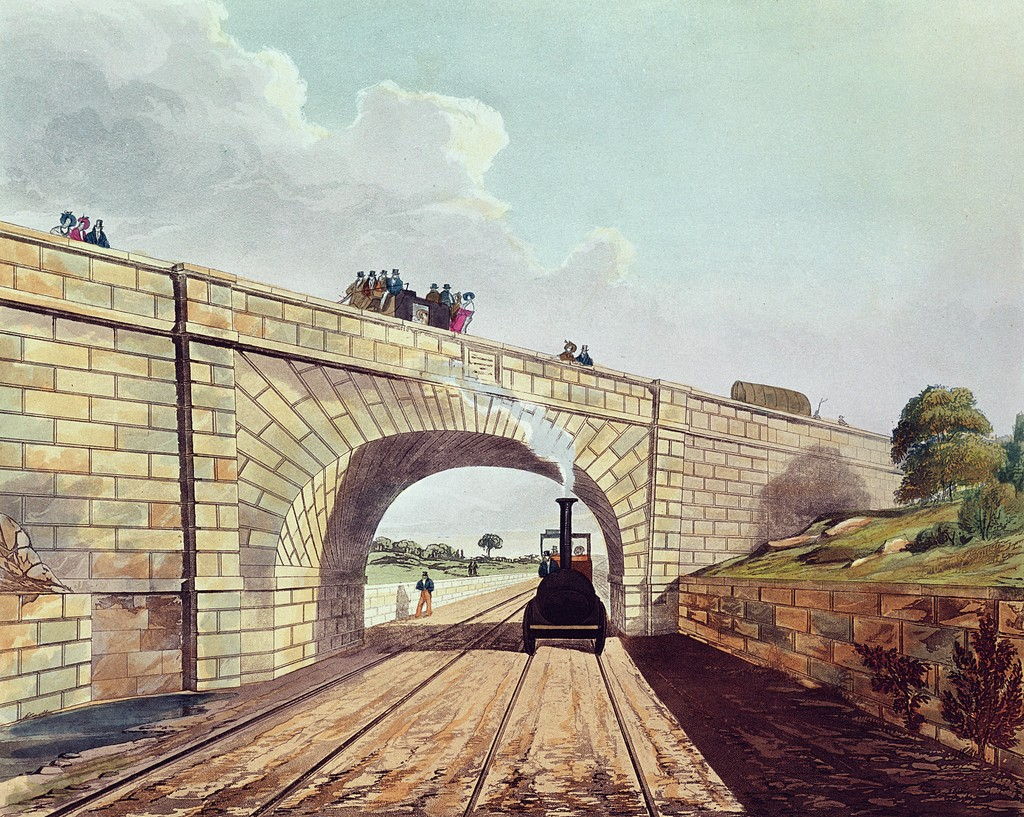
Rainhill Skew Bridge in 1831

The Liverpool & Manchester Railway was the world's first passenger inter-city railway in 1830. Manchester Liverpool Road railway station is the world's oldest surviving railway station, having opened on 15 September 1830; the Stockton & Darlington Railway had opened in 1825. Chat Moss was a problem to constructing the railway, with Edge Hill Tunnel and Sankey Viaduct; the line was bitterly opposed by William Molyneux, 2nd Earl of Sefton. The Bridgewater Canal was the first recognised canal of the modern era. Francis Egerton, 3rd Duke of Bridgewater had visited France and noted their canals. John Gilbert had the innovative idea to use water pumped out of his coal mines to fill a canal from the Duke's Worsley mines to Manchester. It was designed by James Brindley and built in 1761.

The Bridgewater Foundry in Patricroft (Salford) can claim to be the world's first factory with an assembly line type arrangement in 1836. Joseph Huddart of Cumbria was the first to mechanise the production of rope in 1793. The spinning jenny was invented in 1764 in Lancashire by James Hargreaves, a mechanical advance on the spinning wheel.

The University of Manchester built the world's first programmable computer, the Manchester Baby, on 21 June 1948; the Williams–Kilburn tube on the machine was the world's first computer memory, and the beginning of random-access memory (RAM); the baby computer was made from 550 Mullard valves. The first commercially available computer, the Ferranti Mark 1, was made in Manchester and sold in February 1951 to the University of Manchester. The world's first transistor computer was the Manchester Transistor Computer in November 1953. Atlas was another important computer developed at the University of Manchester, largely developed by Tom Kilburn; at the time in 1962 it was most powerful computer in the world. The government had dropped its financial support of this computer, and was only funded by Ferranti—the total development cost was around £1m. Britain was leading the world at this time in computing, with the only main competitor being IBM; after the mid-1950s America took over the industry. The spreadsheet was invented in 1974, known as the Works Record System, and used an Adabas database on an IBM 3270 at ICI in Northwich; it was developed by Robert Mais and it was around four years before (the more well-known) VisiCalc in 1978. The University of Manchester has collected 25 Nobel prizes, though recent years have been less notable.

Parsonage Colliery at Leigh had the UK's deepest mine—1,260 metres in 1949. Macclesfield was the base of UK's silk weaving industry. John Benjamin Dancer of Manchester invented microphotography in 1839, which would lead to microform in the 1920s. Frank Hornby from Liverpool invented Meccano in 1901, where Meccano Ltd would be based for over 60 years. Bryant & May's site in Garston was the last wooden match factory in the UK, closing in 1994 to become The Matchworks business centre off the A561 west of the former Speke airport. Cottonopolis was the industrial name for Manchester and the local area. Manchester at one time was the world's richest city. The CIS Tower, built by John Laing in 1962, was Northern Europe's tallest building, and Britain's tallest building until 1963, and Manchester's tallest building until 2006.

Kirkby was planned in the 1950s as the largest trading estate in Britain—1,800 acres. Trafford Park is the world's first planned industrial estate. Rochdale Society of Equitable Pioneers opened their first co-operative outlet on 21 December 1844.

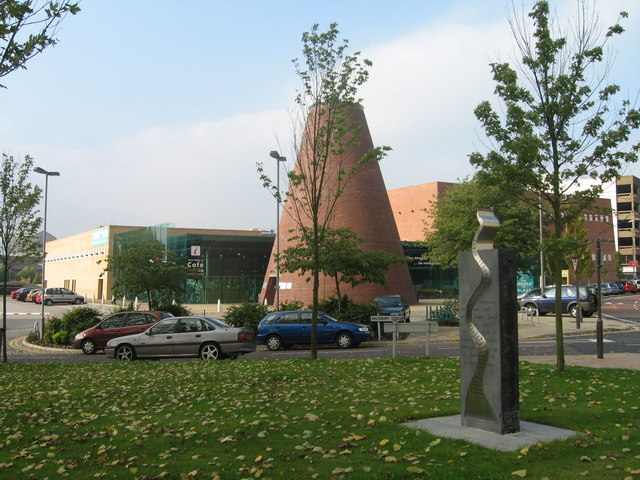
The World of Glass museum in October 2006

Alastair Pilkington invented the float glass method of manufacture in 1957 at St Helens, announcing it in January 1959. It was manufactured from 1961, and 80% of the world's glass is made with the process; the former site closed in 2014 and it is made now at the Green Gate site. Pears soap, made at Port Sunlight, is the world's first registered brand, and world's oldest brand in existence. Elihu Thomson, born in Manchester who subsequently moved to America, formed Thomson-CSF which became Thales Group in 2000. The British part (British Thomson-Houston) would later become part of GEC; he invented the arc lamp. Henry Brunner from Liverpool would join with Ludwig Mond in the 1860s to form a chemical company which became ICI in 1926. Mossbay Steelworks in Workington, when opened in 1877, were the world's first large-scale steelworks; its austenitic manganese steel (mangalloy) was produced from 1877 until 1974, with Britain's railways converting from iron to steel by the 1880s. Track was made there for the UK's railways (exclusively from the 1970s onwards, with the steel made in Teesside) until August 2006; much of the rails made were exported (from 1882), with its main competitor being Voestalpine of Austria, and a plant (bought by British Steel in 1999) in Hayange, France, who make all of SNCF's railway tracks, and the Katowice Steelworks in Poland. Workington was thought to make the best quality rail track in the world.

Sebastian Ziani de Ferranti, born in Liverpool in 1864, was an electrical engineer who designed the layout for Deptford Power Station, the first alternating current power station in the world in 1887, and whose design all others would follow; his later company Ferranti, of Oldham, would later be an industry leader in Britain's defence electronics, on the FTSE 100 Index. Ferranti's design of increasing AC voltage to high tension at the power station, to be stepped-down at a transformer at substations before entering properties, is the system all electricity networks take today; the system reduces wasteful heating of electricity transmission cables.

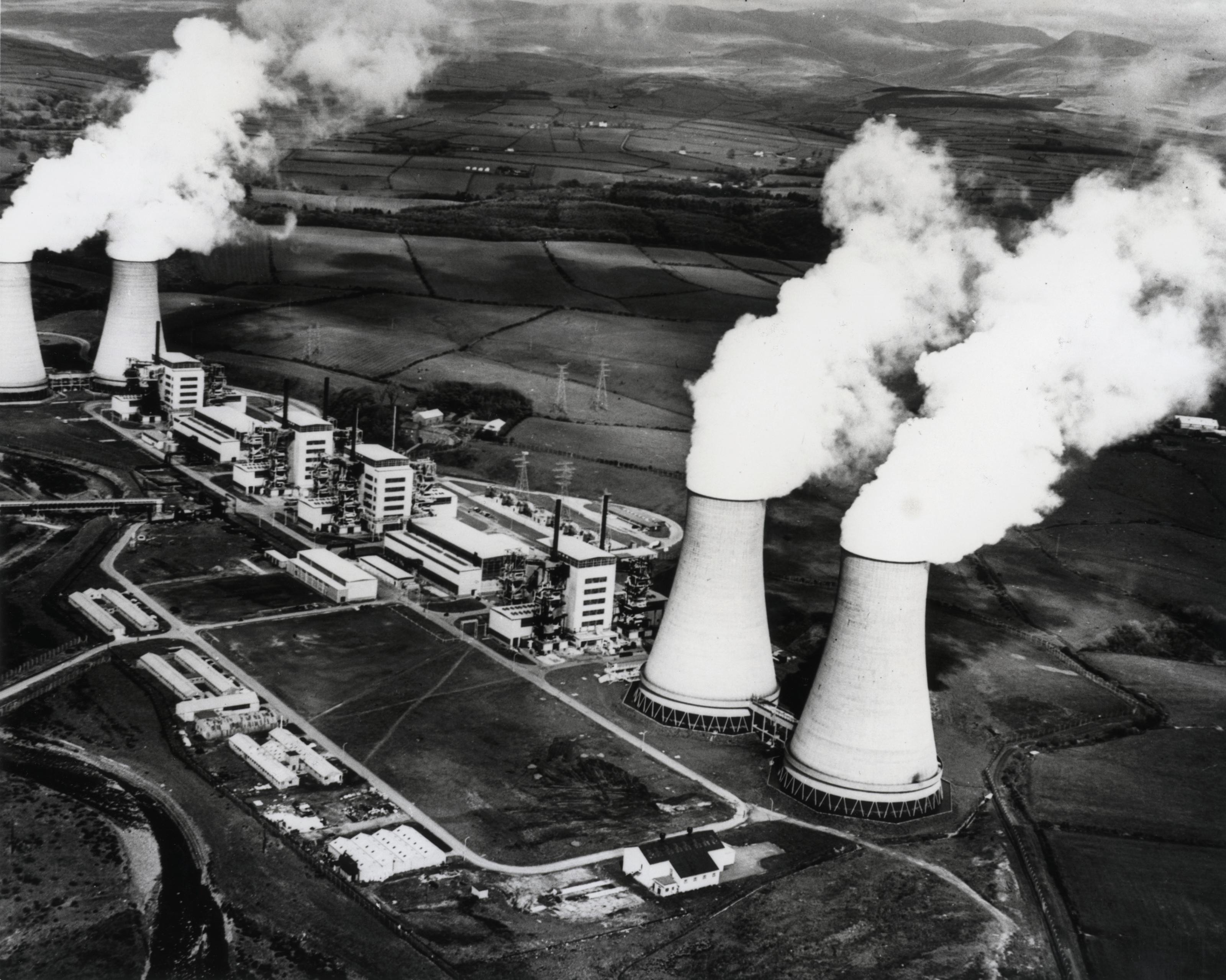
Calder Hall in 1973

The Chain Home radar transmitters were built by Metrovick at its Trafford Park Works, which became part of AEI in 1929, GEC in 1968, and as Alstom it was closed in June 2000. 2ZY, the first broadcasts in the north of England, were made from the Metrovick factory in November 1922, which became part of the BBC National Programme in 1927. GEC opened its first factory in Manchester in 1888, moving to Salford in 1895 at the Peel Works, and had built the Osram electric light company in 1893. The Metropolitan-Vickers F.2 of Trafford Park Works, Manchester was the first axial-flow jet engine, with a nine-stage compressor, first running in 1941. It would end up as the Armstrong Siddeley Sapphire and the American-built Wright J65. The F.2 gas turbine would power MGB.2009 the first gas-turbine-powered vessel in 1947. No. 1 Parachute Training School RAF—the main parachute training site for the war—was at RAF Ringway (the Central Landing Establishment and Airborne Forces Experimental Establishment) now Manchester Airport; many aircraft were built there too, and the Ford Trafford Park Factory built 34,000 aircraft engines—mostly Merlin engines; the nearby Metropolitan-Vickers factory built many Lancasters.

Calder Hall was the world's first nuclear power station in 1956. There are approximately 430 nuclear power stations around the world, and the UK is the third most experienced operator of nuclear reactors after the US and France, and is the world's ninth largest producer of nuclear-generated electricity, with nine stations operating in the UK producing around 10GW. New-build nuclear power stations will either be the AP1000 (Toshiba Westinghouse NuGeneration) or EPR design (developed by Areva). BNFL bought Pittsburgh-based Westinghouse Electric Company in 1999; it was sold in October 2006 for £5.4 billion to Toshiba. British Energy was sold in 2009 for £12.5 billion to EDF; Centrica (British Gas) had also wanted to buy it; 26 Magnox reactors were built in the UK, followed by 14 AGR reactors.

Operation Hurricane on 3 October 1952, Britain's first nuclear bomb, detonated on HMS Plym on the Montebello Islands in the state of Western Australia, was made of plutonium-239 mostly made at Windscale (which began production in 1950), with some possibly from Chalk River Laboratories in Ontario, Canada (where the Tube Alloys project was later moved).

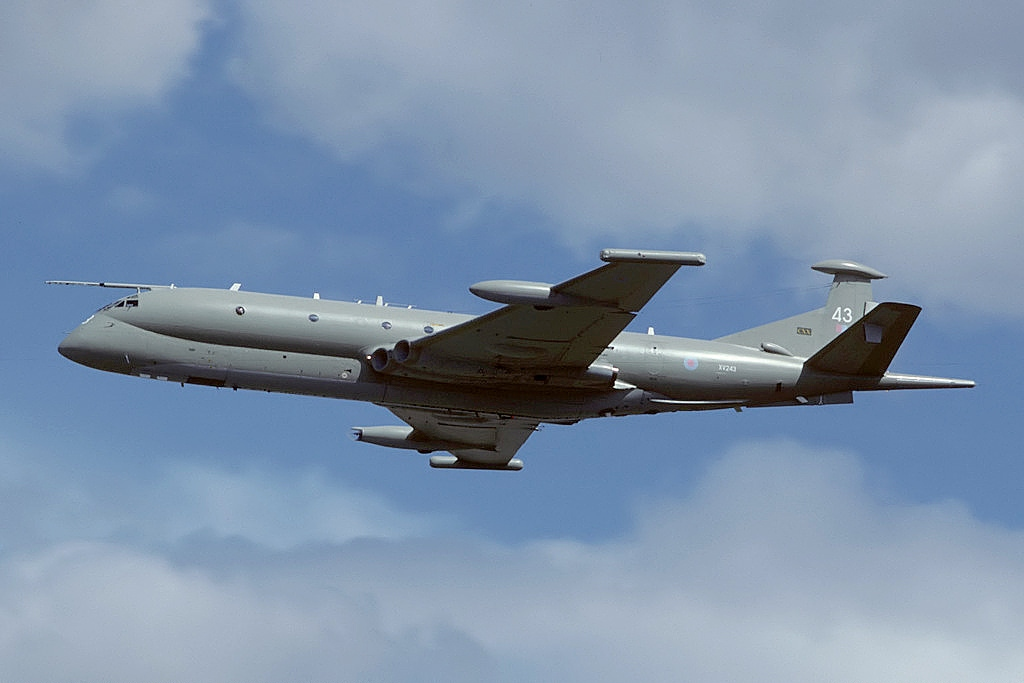
A Hawker Siddeley Nimrod MR2 (HS 801), built at Woodford (former Avro) and designed in Manchester in the mid-1960s, with XV148 (former Comet 4C) making its first flight on 23 May 1967, flying from Chester (Broughton, which had built many de Havilland fighter jet aircraft) to Woodford; 49 Nimrods were made for the RAF, entering service with 201 Sqn on 6 November 1970, serving until March 2010 with 38 Sqn

W. T. Glover & Co. of Salford were important electricity cable manufacturers throughout the early 20th century. BAE Systems Wind Tunnel Department at Warton—one of its four wind tunnels—the High Speed Wind Tunnel—can test speeds intermittently up to Mach 3.8 (trisonic)—the second fastest in the UK, to the University of Manchester's Aero-Physics Laboratory which has a hypersonic wind tunnel up to Mach 6. Osborne Reynolds of Owens College (which became the Victoria University of Manchester in 1904), known worldwide for his Reynolds number (introduced elsewhere by the mathematician George Gabriel Stokes), showed in the early 1880s that wind tunnels (invented by Francis Herbert Wenham in 1871) could model large-scale objects accurately. BAE Systems Regional Aircraft assembled Britain's last airliner, the British Aerospace 146 (Avro RJX), at Woodford in November 2001. The Merlin-powered Avro Tudor G-AGPF, which took off from what is now Manchester Airport on 14 June 1945, was Britain's first pressurised civilian aircraft; only 38 were built and it was designed for the North Atlantic route. On 13 May 1949, VN799 the English Electric Canberra first flew from Warton: Warton at the time was a former USAAF wartime maintenance base; the German Arado Ar 234 was technically the world's first jet bomber; the Canberra would be the first jet aircraft to make a non-stop crossing of the Atlantic on 21 February 1951.

Robert Whitehead of Bolton invented the modern-day torpedo in 1866. Sir William Pickles Hartley of Lancashire founded Hartley's Jam in 1871, building a purpose-built village at Aintree. Sir Henry Tate also came from Lancashire, joining Abram Lyle in 1921, of whose Golden syrup tins are claimed to be Britain's oldest brand; he established the Tate Gallery in 1897. Robert Hope-Jones of the Wirral invented the Wurlitzer organ. The Christys' & Co factory in Stockport was the largest hat-making factory in the world in the nineteenth century; it became part of Associated British Hat Manufacturers and is now in Oxfordshire. The company owner's son founded Christy in 1850 in Droylsden (now in Tameside), which invented the industrially produced towel.

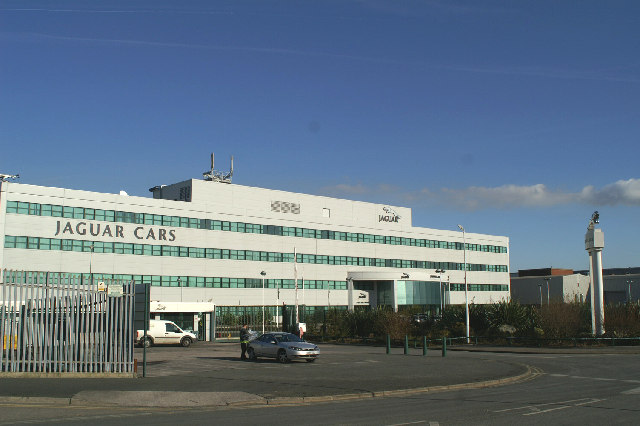
JLR at Halewood

Britain's most popular car, the Ford Escort, was made throughout its life (until 21 July 2000) at Halewood by Ford; 5 million were made there from 1967. In 1998, production of its replacement the Focus was transferred to Saarlouis and Valencia, which signalled the end of the site's ownership by Ford. The Jaguar X-Type was first made there in May 2001, until late 2009. In the UK, the Mondeo has sold 1.4m since 1993, and is made in Valencia in Spain.

Starchaser Industries of Hyde is hoping to send a British citizen into space, on a British rocket; BAC at Preston had proposed its MUSTARD re-usable spacecraft in 1964, which although not built had given NASA a concept.

=== Culture ===
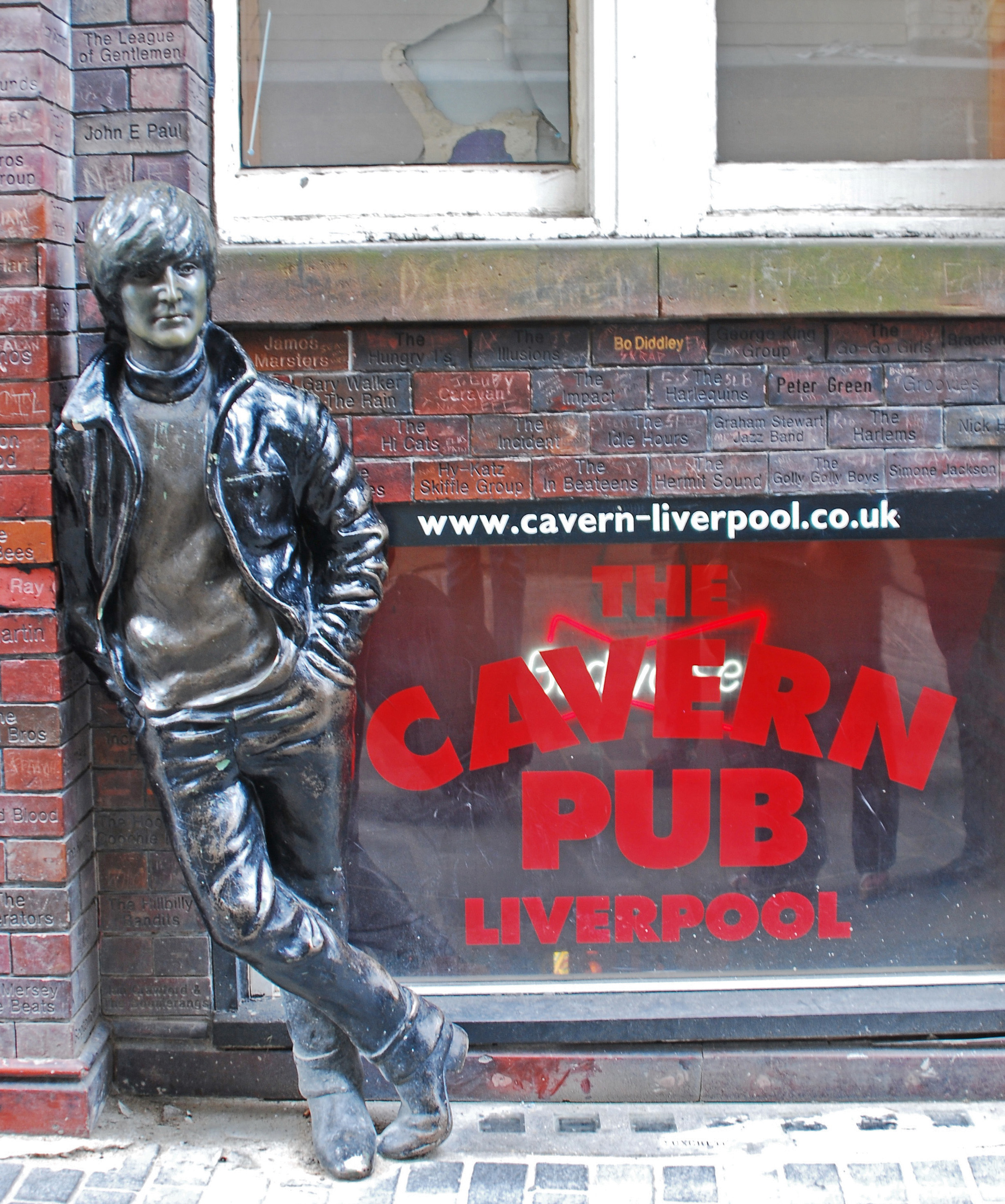
Statue of John Lennon of the Beatles at The Cavern Club, Liverpool

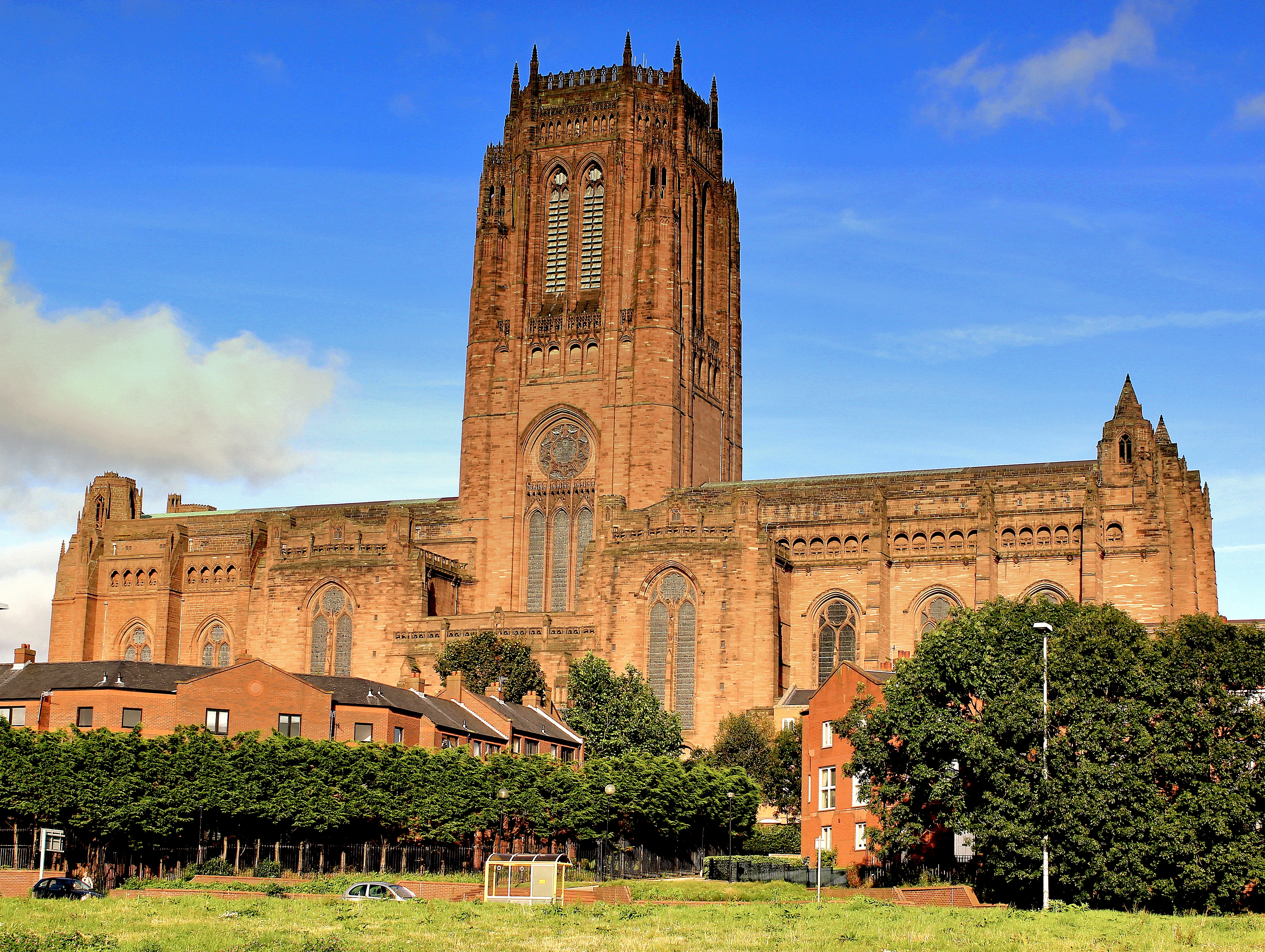
Liverpool Anglican Cathedral, the largest religious building in the UK

The Suffragette movement came from Manchester—the Women's Social and Political Union. Arthur Wynne, born in Liverpool, invented the crossword in December 1913. On 13 August 1964, Britain carried out its last two executions at Strangeways and Walton Prison. Under the Museums Act 1845, the UK's second and third public municipal libraries were at Warrington in 1848 and at Salford Museum and Art Gallery in 1850; Canterbury had been first in 1847. The first Trades Union Congress was held in 1868 at the Mechanics' Institute, Manchester. The World Pie Eating Championship is held in Wigan each year.

Ann Lee from Manchester started the USA Shakers movement, founded out of the Quakers, which itself has strong links to Pendle Hill in Lancashire. Joseph Livesey of Preston was the founder of Britain's temperance movement, and the word teetotal was first coined in Preston in 1833. The crumbly Cheshire cheese is thought to be the oldest in Britain. Heaton Park in north Manchester is the largest municipal park in Europe. Jelly Babies were invented in Lancaster in 1864, at Fryers of Lancashire. The first KFC outlet in the UK was on Fishergate in Preston in May 1965, opened by the entrepreneur Ray Allen. Oldham claims to be the site of the first fried potatoes in the UK in 1860. The UK's biggest dance music festival takes place on the August Bank Holiday at Creamfields on Daresbury Estate. Ingvar Kamprad's IKEA opened its first UK store in Warrington on 1 October 1987; the UK was the 20th country at the time that IKEA had been established. The International Cheese Awards are held at the end of July in Nantwich.

Liverpool and Manchester, the two largest cities in the North West by population, are known for being the birthplace of beat music (also called "Merseybeat") during the 1960s to 1970s, and the development of the Madchester music scene from the 1980s, and 1990s respectively.

A Taste of Honey was an influential 1960s film set in Salford, depicting working class poverty in ways not previously seen at the cinema, known as kitchen sink realism; Walter Greenwood's Love on the Dole, a 1930s book also set in Salford, was thought by the BBFC to be too sordid a depiction of poverty to be made into a film; Mike Leigh, from Salford, has produced films on a similar subject.

== Transport ==
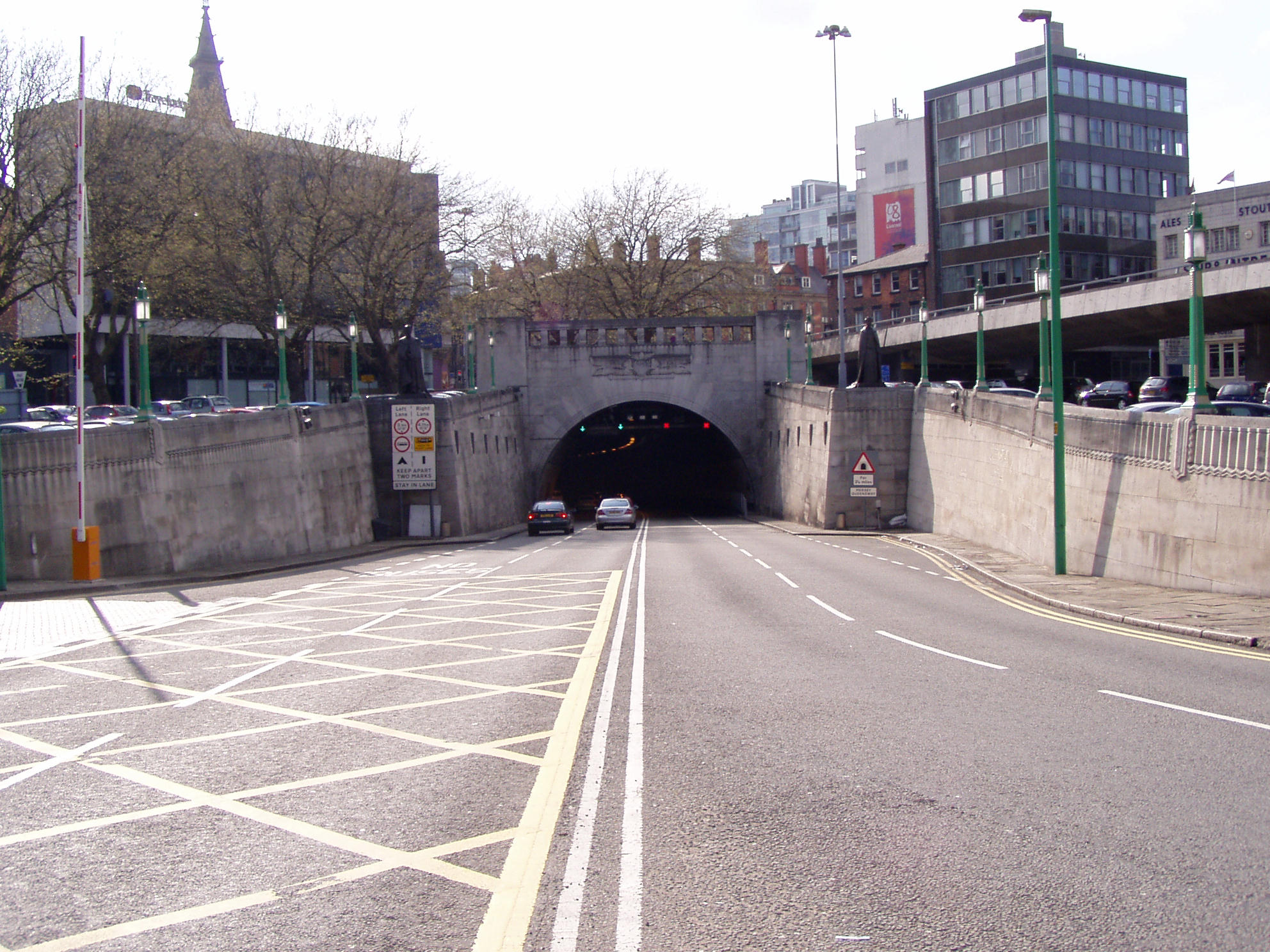
Queensway Tunnel, Liverpool under the River Mersey to Birkenhead, Wirral peninsula

=== Transport policy ===
As part of the national transport planning system, the North West Regional Assembly was, before its abolition in 2008, required to produce a Regional Transport Strategy (RTS) to provide long term planning for transport in the region. This involved region wide transport schemes, such as those carried out by the Highways Agency and Network Rail. Within the region, the local transport authorities plan for the future by producing Local Transport Plans (LTPs) which outline their strategies, policies and implementation programmes. The most recent LTP is that for the period 2006–11. In the North West region, the following transport authorities have published their LTP online: Blackburn with Darwen U.A, Blackpool U.A., Cheshire, Cumbria, Greater Manchester, Halton U.A., Lancashire, Merseyside and Warrington U.A. Since 1 April 2009, when the county of Cheshire was split into two unitary councils the Cheshire transport authority ceased to exist, however it is the most recent LTP for the area.

=== Road ===
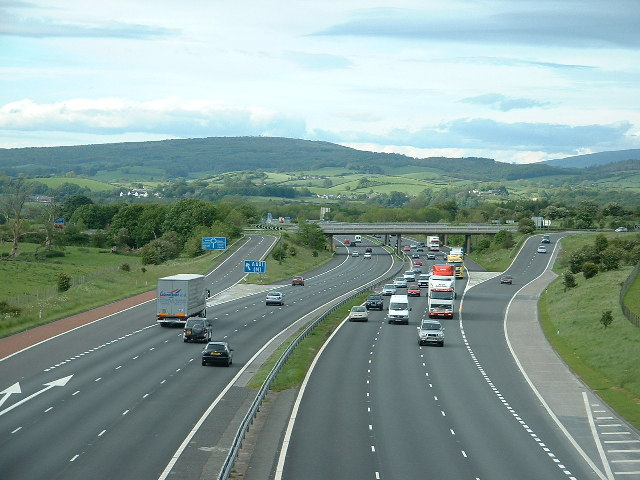
The M6 motorway is one of the North West's principal roads

==== Regionwide ====
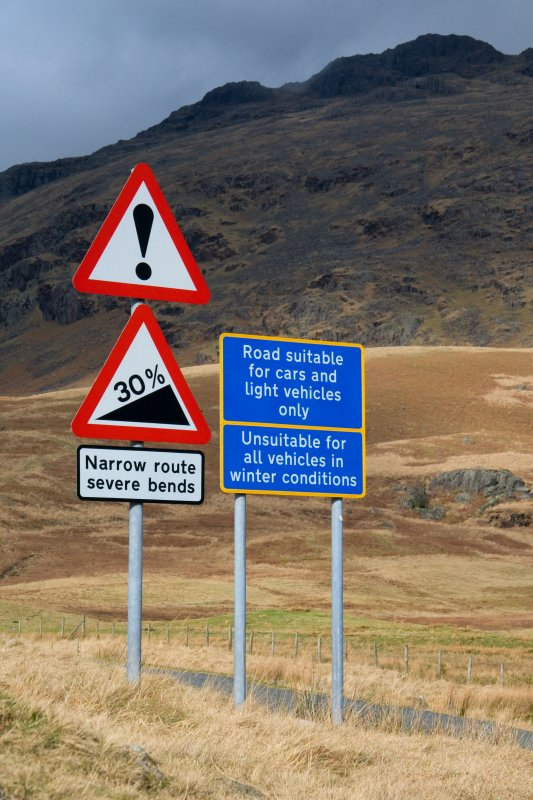
Warning signs at Hardknott Pass

Regionwide, the principal road link is the M6, which enters the region, from Scotland, near Carlisle in the north and leaves it, for the English Midlands, near Crewe in the south. It connects such towns and cities as Penrith, Kendal, Lancaster, Preston, Warrington, Liverpool and Manchester. The M6 intersects many of the North West's motorways and A-roads, carrying almost 120,000 vehicles per day (41,975,000 per year).

Britain's most severe steep road is Hardknott Pass in Cumbria and the highest road in the UK is the former A6293 at 2,780 ft at Milburn, Cumbria; the highest classified road in England was the A689 east of Nenthead in Cumbria on the Durham boundary.

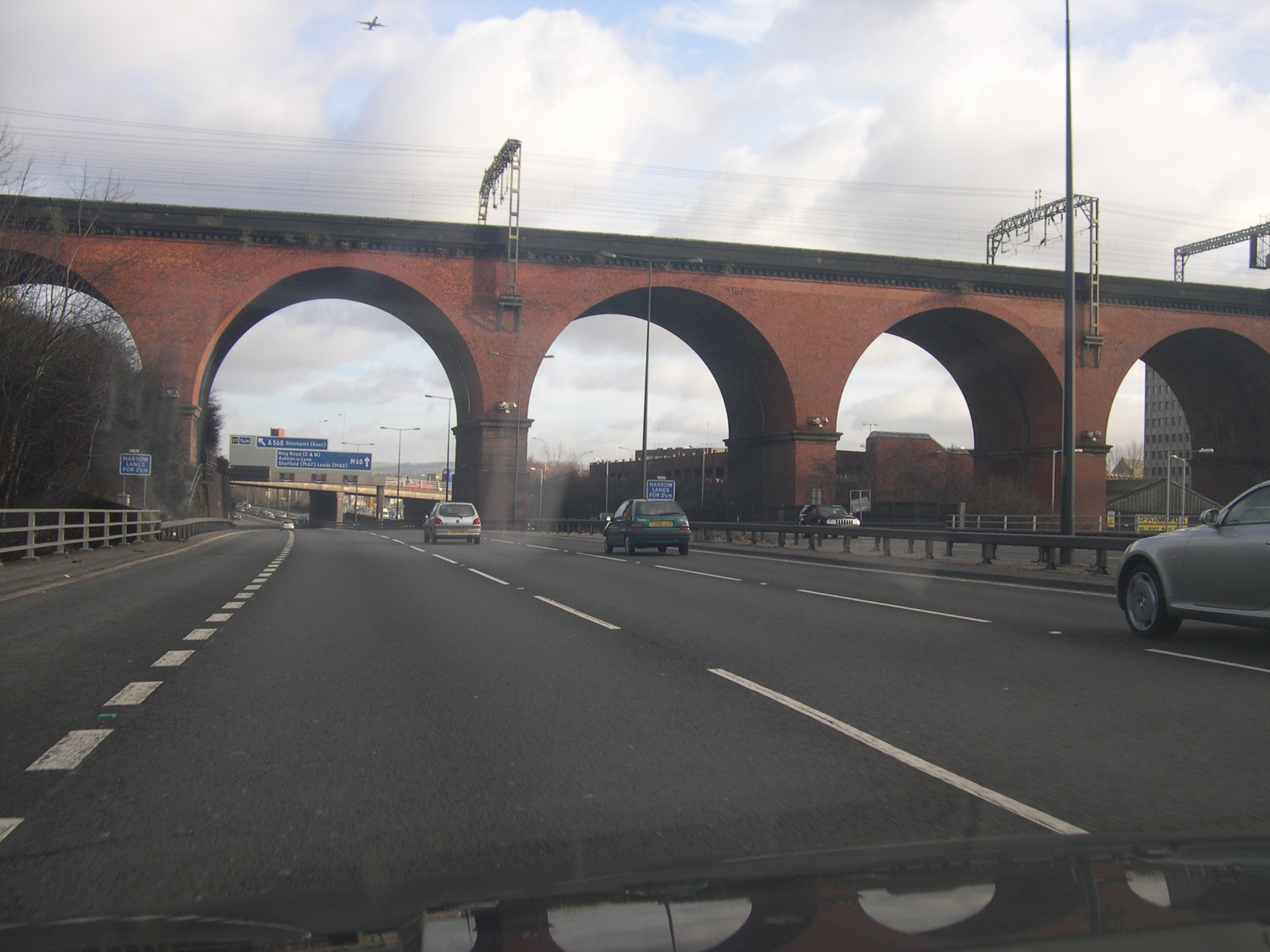
Old meets new at the Stockport Viaduct; designed by George W. Buck, it is the largest free-standing brick structure in the UK, built in 1840 when it was the largest viaduct in the world; it features in many L. S. Lowry paintings.

==== Greater Manchester and Merseyside ====
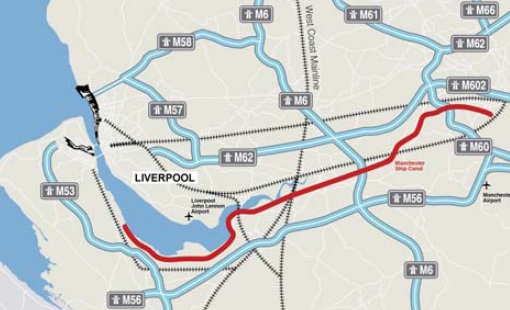
Motorways of Liverpool City Region and Cheshire to Manchester

The Greater Manchester and Merseyside areas are home to almost 4 million people; over half of the region's population. The road networks intertwining these metropolitan areas are extremely important to the economy and are largely motorway, including the M62 which crosses the entire country (east to west, Hull to Liverpool); this motorway directly connects the cities of Manchester and Liverpool, carrying 78,000 vehicles in the North West per day.

The Merseyside-Manchester region has many other motorways that serve many millions on a daily basis: the M61 connects Manchester to Preston; the M56 runs south of Manchester to Cheshire and Wales; the M57 and M58 motorways run north of Liverpool and connect towns such as St. Helens and Wigan; the M60 is Manchester's ring road; and the M67 and M66 motorways run east and north respectively, both of these roads are under 10 mi (16 km) and link Manchester to smaller outlying settlements. On top of this there are countless numbers of A-roads, B-roads and minor roads which circle, entwine and serve these two major metropolises.

==== Cumbria ====
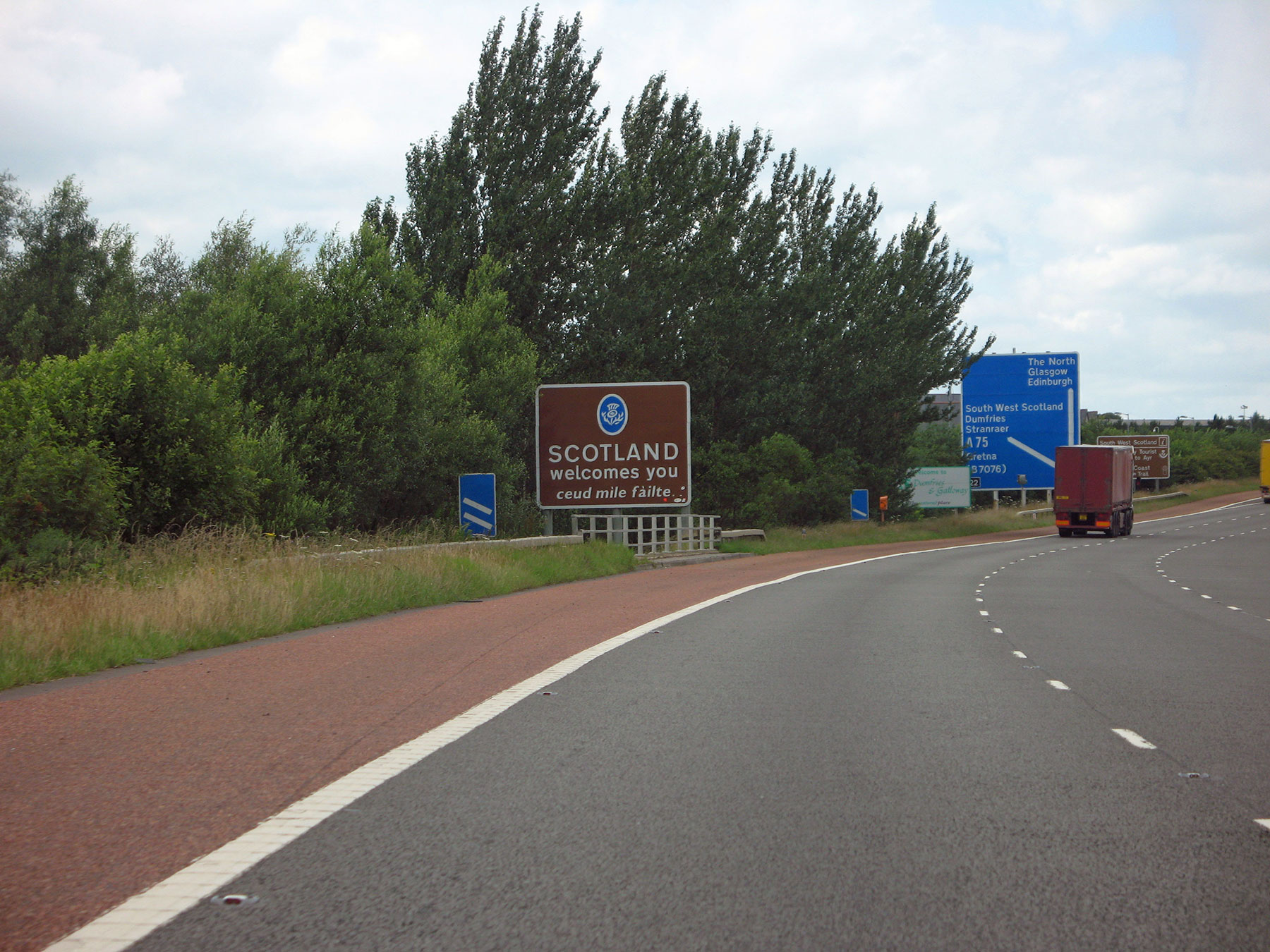
A sign marking entry to Scotland located on the M6 motorway crossing the border of Cumbria.

In Cumbria the M6 runs all the way down the east of the county connecting the very north of England to the Lancashire border. The A590 links Barrow-in-Furness to Kendal with around 14,000 vehicles per day. The A595 runs all the way along the West Cumbrian coast beginning near Barrow and ending in Carlisle, linking towns such as Whitehaven and Workington. The A591 road runs from Kendal to the centre of the county connecting Lake District settlements like Windermere, Ambleside and Keswick. Other important A-roads include the A5092, A66, A596 and formerly the A74, until this was upgraded to motorway standard as an extension of the M6 between 2006 and 2008 to meet the A74(M) at the Scottish border.

==== Lancashire ====
The Lancashire economy relies strongly on the M6, which also runs from north to south (Lancaster to Chorley). Other motorways in the region include the M55, which connects the city of Preston and the town of Blackpool at 11.5 mi (18.5 km) in length. The M65 motorway runs from east to west, starting in the town of Colne, running past Burnley, Accrington, Blackburn and terminating in Preston. The Lancaster-Morecambe area is served by the A683, A6, A588 and A589 roads. The Blackpool-Fylde-Fleetwood area is home to the A583, A584, A585, A586, A587 and A588 roads. The city of Preston and its surroundings are served by the A6, A59, A582, A583, A584 and, to the very south-east, the M61 motorway. To the east of the county are the A59, A6119, A677, A679, A666, A680, A56, A646 and A682. The M66 begins 500 m (0.3 mi) inside the county border near Edenfield, providing an important link between east Lancashire and Manchester.

==== Cheshire ====
In Cheshire, there are four motorways: the M6, the M56 (linking Chester to the east), the M53 (linking Chester to Birkenhead) and the M62, which runs just along the county's northern border with Merseyside and Greater Manchester. The Cheshire road system is made up of 3,417 mi (5,499 km) of highway and the principal road (M6) carries 140,000 vehicles in the county daily, linking the North West to the West Midlands.

The county town of Chester is served by the A55, A483 and A494 roads, amongst others. To the west of the M6, Crewe, Northwich and Sandbach are served by the A54, A51, A49, A533, A556 and A530 roads; these all eventually link up connecting the towns to the larger cities, including Stoke-on-Trent to the south. To the east of the M6 in Cheshire lies the Peak District and towns such as Macclesfield and Congleton, which are served by the A6, A537, A536, A34, A523 and A566 roads.

=== Air ===
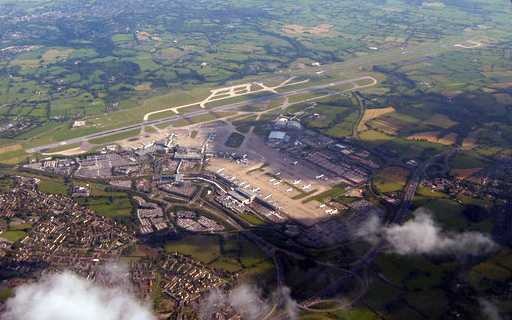
Manchester Airport aerial view

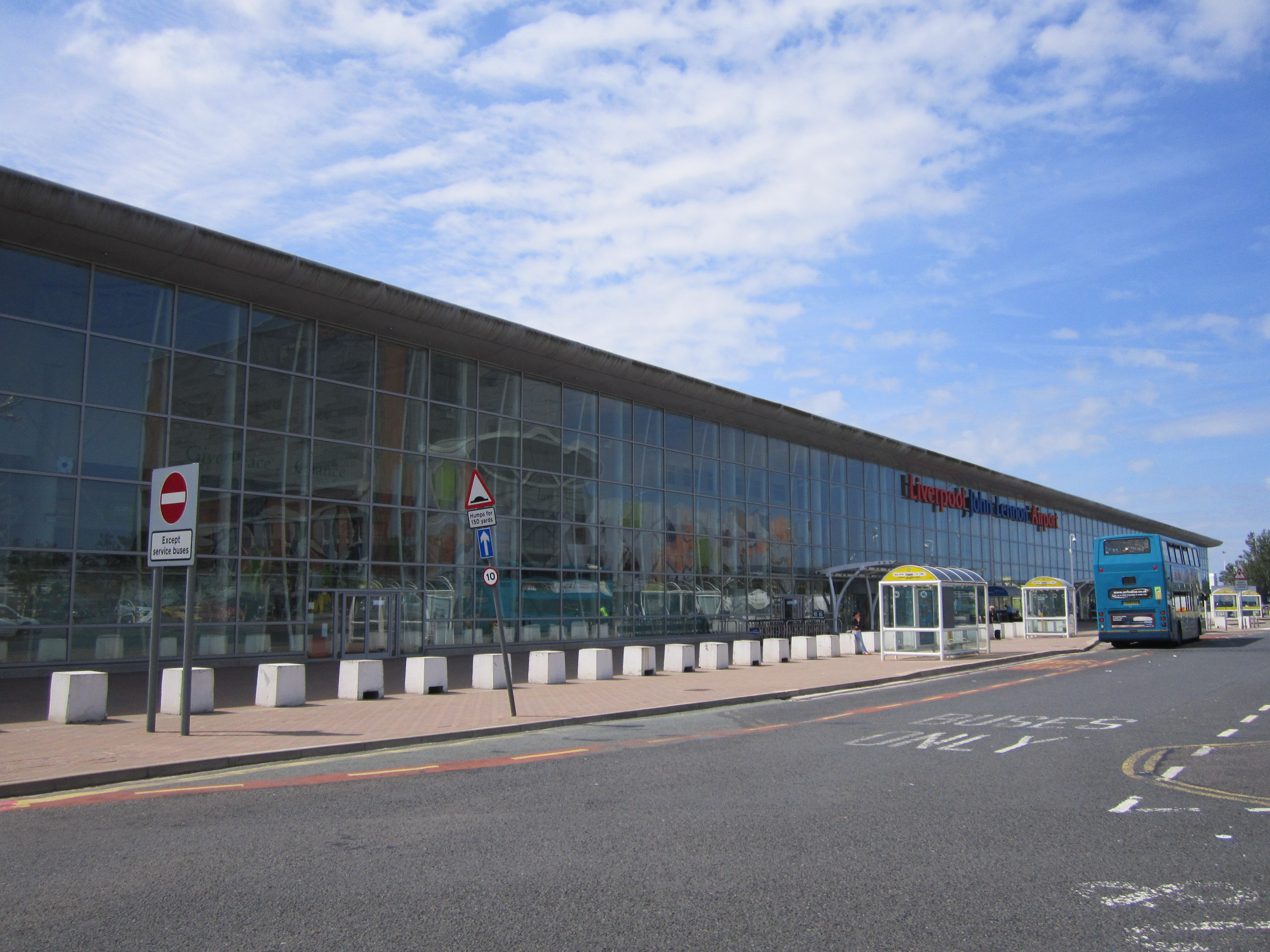
Liverpool John Lennon Airport Terminal building

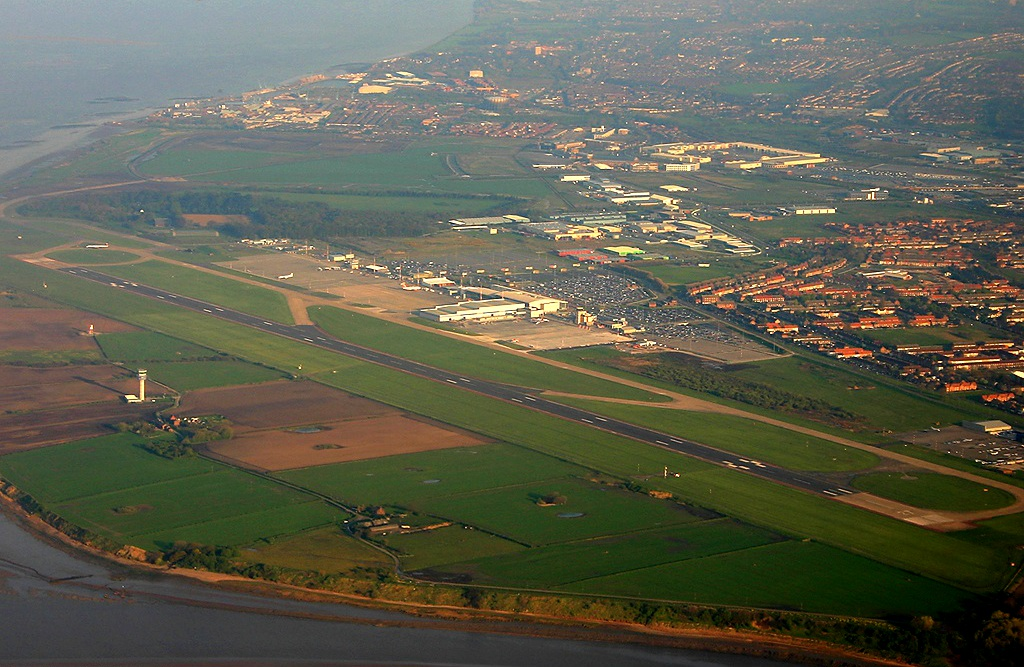
Aerial view of Liverpool John Lennon Airport

The biggest international airport in the region is Manchester Airport, which serves 28.2 million passengers annually; more than some of the world's major aviation hubs. The airport is home to three terminals, plus the World Freight Terminal, which serve destinations worldwide. The largest airlines at the airport (in terms of numbers of flights in 2007) were Flybe, BMI, British Airways, Jet2.com and Lufthansa; several long-haul carriers such as American Airlines, Delta Air Lines, Virgin Atlantic, Singapore Airlines and Emirates also operate from the airport. Manchester Airports Group is owned approximately one-third by Manchester Council and one-third by the other nine Greater Manchester councils. In 2007, Manchester had a recorded 222,703 aircraft movements. The airport is also a hub for major holiday airlines such as First Choice Airways and Thomson Airways; it was previously served by Thomas Cook Airlines and Monarch Airlines.

The region's second largest airport, but is the oldest and fastest growing, is Liverpool John Lennon Airport, which serves over 5 million passengers annually. The airport serves destinations primarily in the UK and Europe and is a major hub for EasyJet and Ryanair.

The only other significant passenger airport in the region was Blackpool Airport, which was refurbished in 2006 and handled around half a million passengers annually. Destinations ranged from the Canary Islands in Spain to the Republic of Ireland. Commercial flights ended there in March 2017.

Cumbria

- Barrow/Walney Island Airport – Operated by BAE Systems Submarines, private use
- Carlisle Lake District Airport – Operated by Stobart Group, public use

Greater Manchester

- Manchester Airport – Major international airport operated by Manchester Airport Group, destinations worldwide
- Manchester Barton Aerodrome – Operated by City Airport Manchester Ltd, public use
- Woodford Aerodrome – Operated by BAE Systems Regional Aircraft, now closed

Lancashire

- Blackpool Airport – Operated by Balfour Beatty, public use (commercial flights withdrawn)
- Warton Aerodrome – Operated by BAE Systems, private use

Merseyside

- Liverpool John Lennon Airport – International airport operated by Liverpool Airport plc, destinations worldwide
- RAF Woodvale – Operated by the Royal Air Force, military use
- Southport Birkdale Sands airstrip – Sand runway located on Southport beach (infrequent use, subject to prior permission)

=== Rail ===
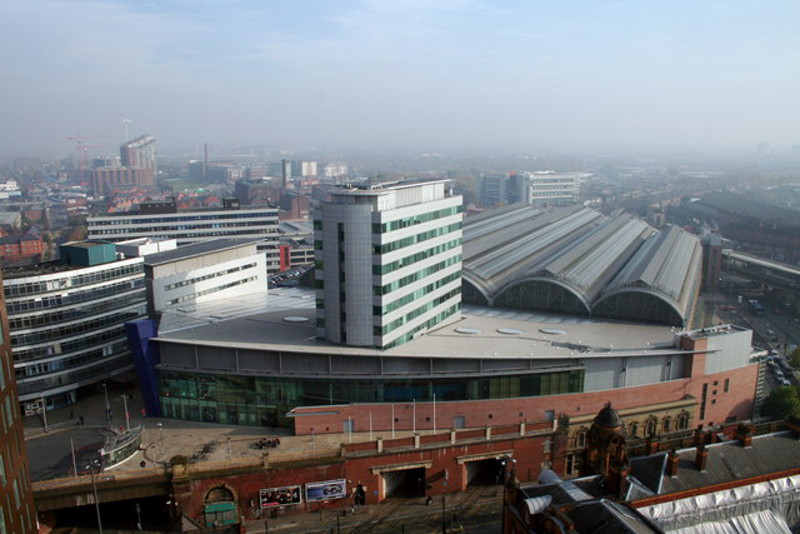
Manchester's Piccadilly station is the largest and busiest railway station in the region.

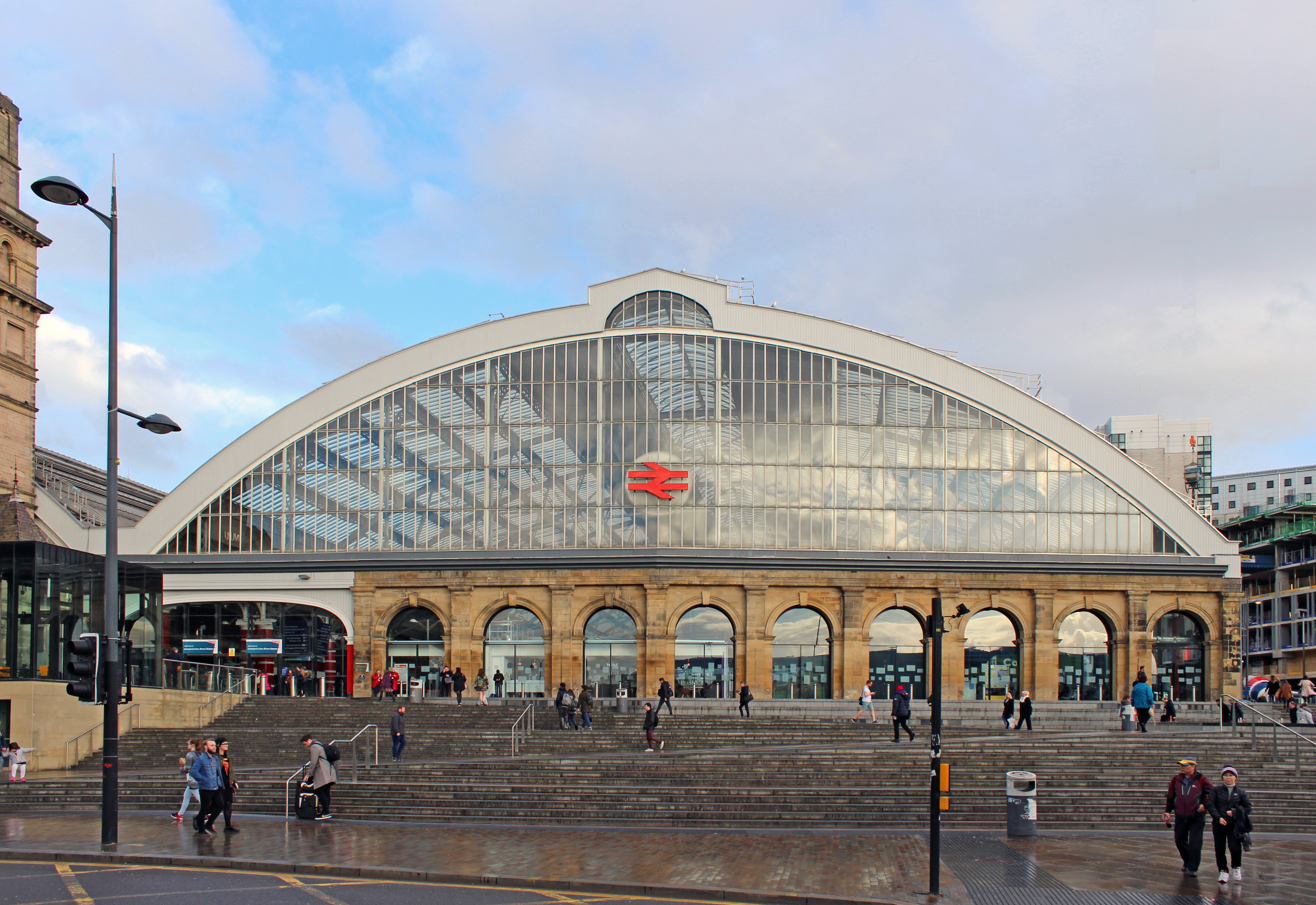
Liverpool Lime Street railway station is the main inter-city and long-distance station in Liverpool

The main connection by train is the West Coast Main Line, connecting most of the North West. Other important lines are the Liverpool to Manchester Lines and the North TransPennine, which connects Liverpool to Manchester through Warrington. East-west connections in Lancashire are carried via the Caldervale Line to Blackpool. Liverpool and Manchester both have extensive local passenger rail networks operating high-frequency commuter trains. The quietest railway station in the region, by usage, is Reddish South, the 4th quietest in Britain.

The InterCity branded service in the UK began between London and Manchester in the mid-1960s; the new Euston station opened in 1968. With the new electrification of the line in the late 1960s, passenger numbers doubled.

The region saw the last steam-train service on the UK network – the Fifteen Guinea Special on 11 August 1968, with three Black Five locomotives.

=== Water ===
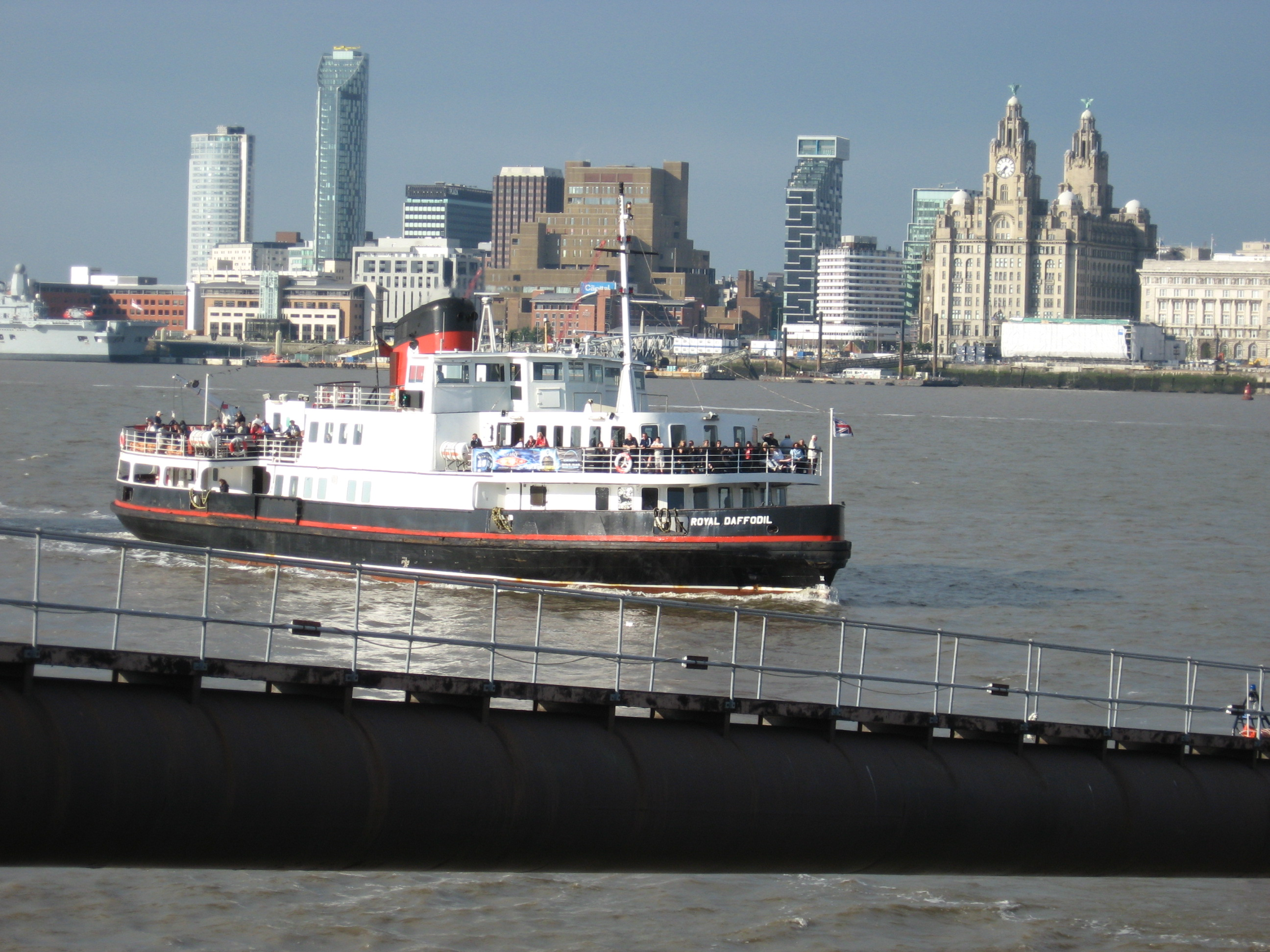
Mersey Ferry Royal Daffodil

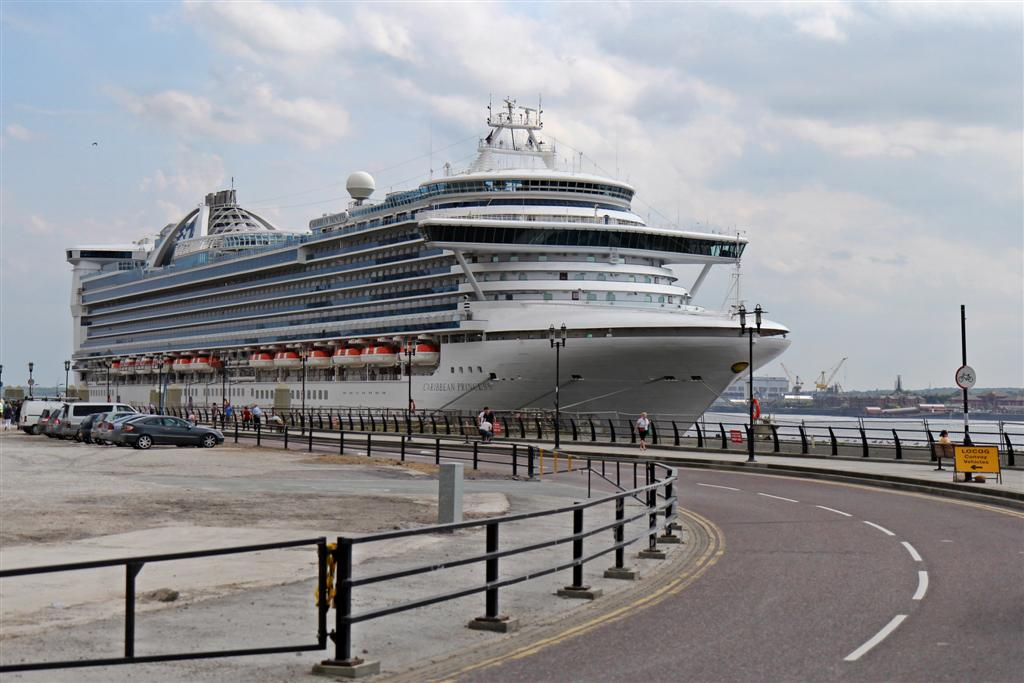
Liverpool Cruise Terminal

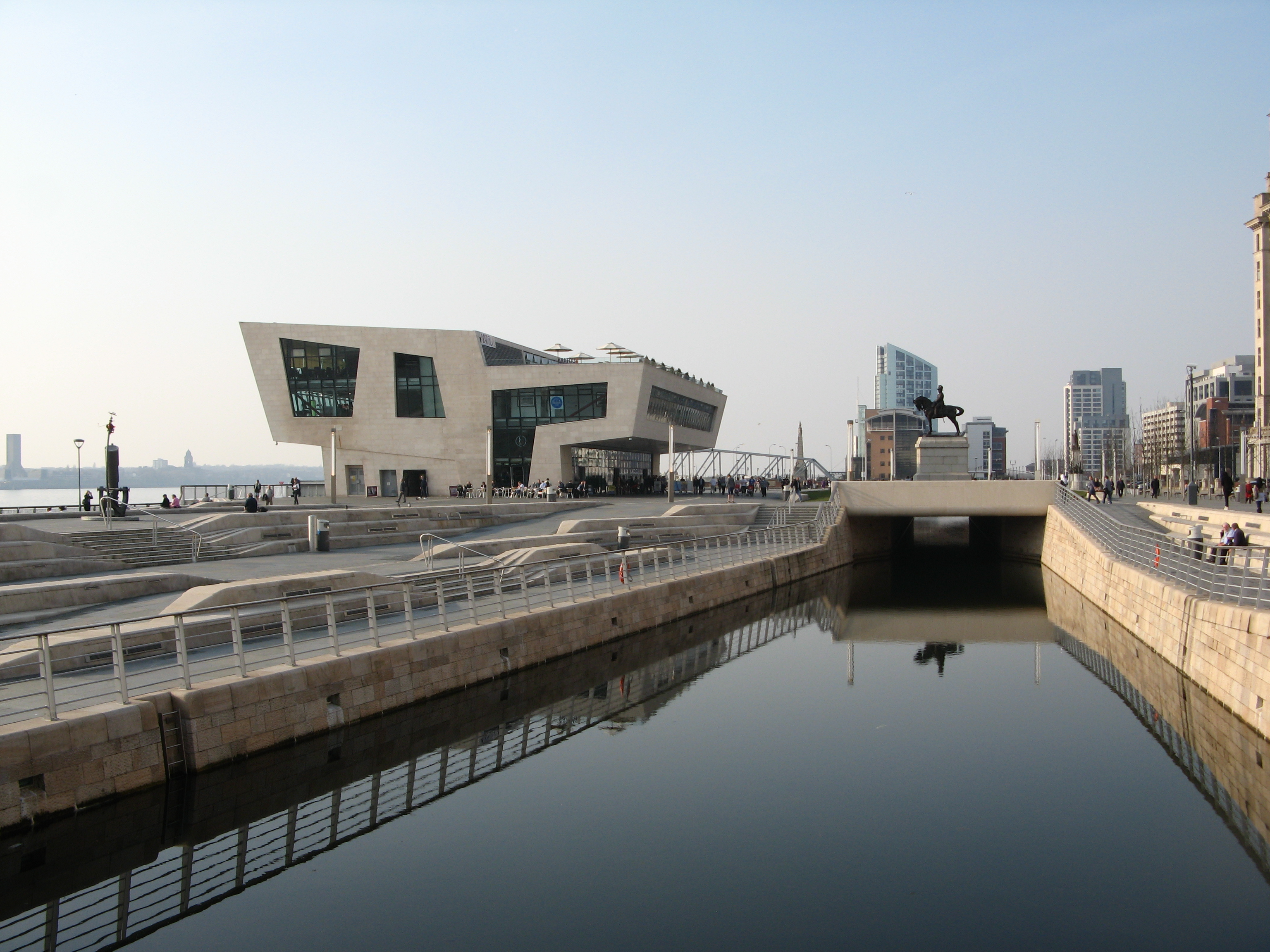
Leeds and Liverpool Canal

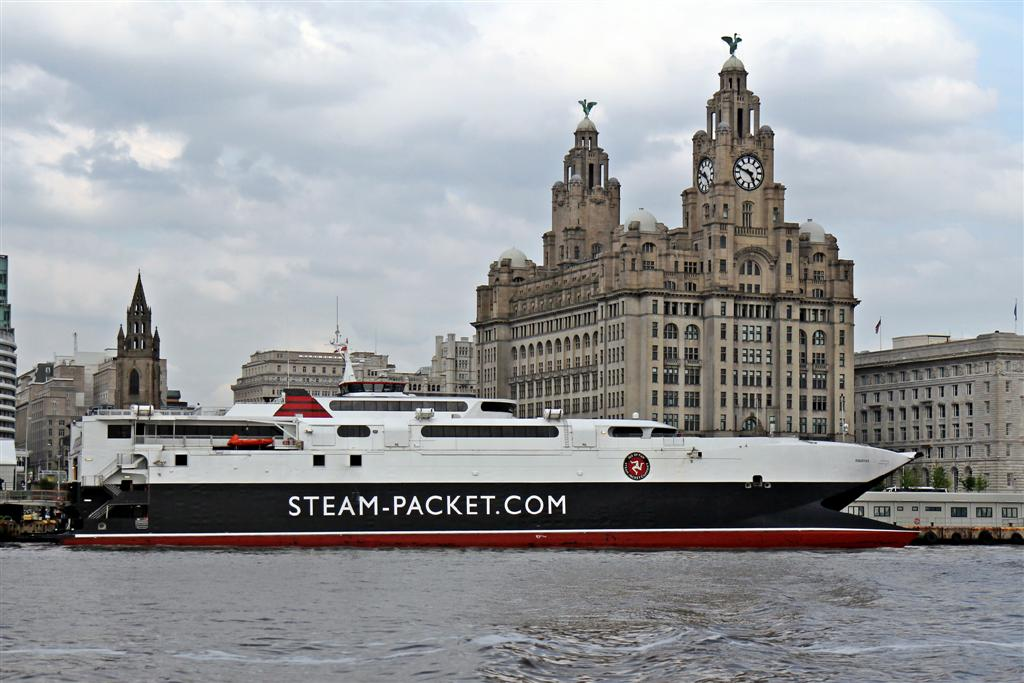
Isle of Man Steam Packet

Isle of Man Steam Packet route map

Manchester Ship Canal

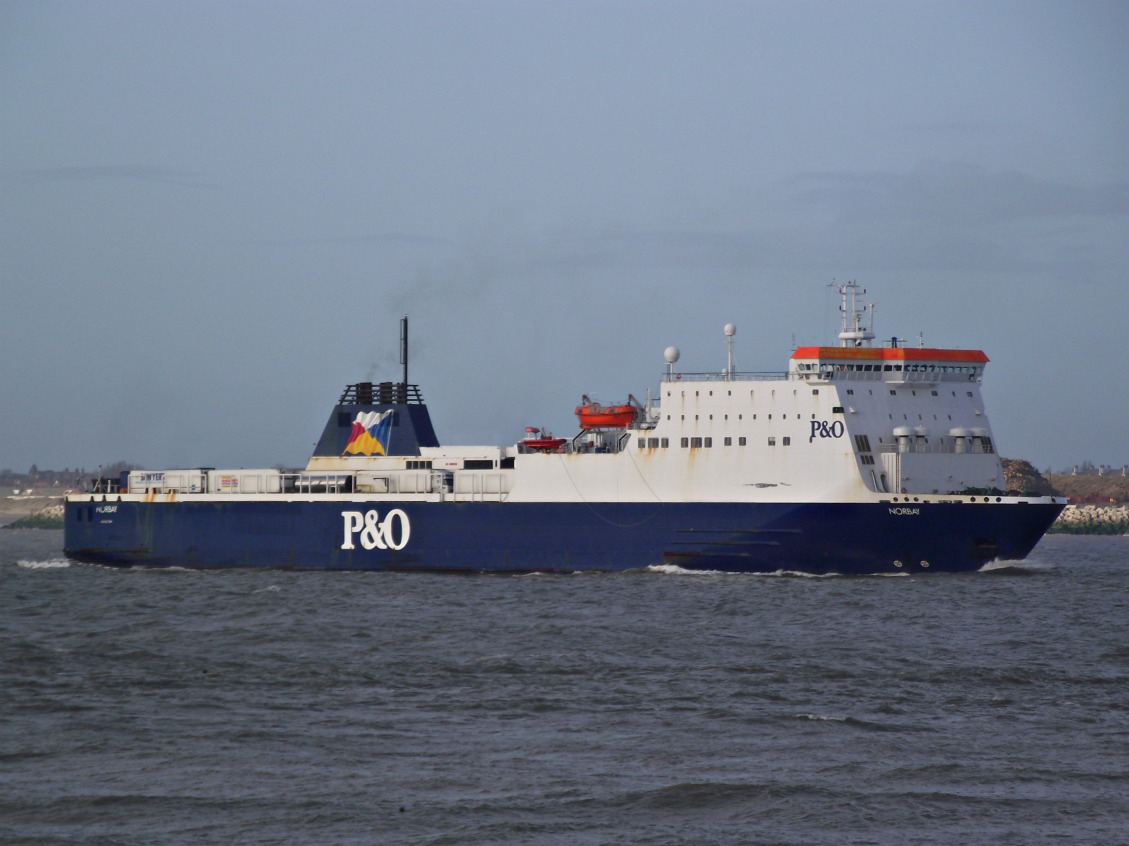
MS Norbay operates Liverpool to Dublin

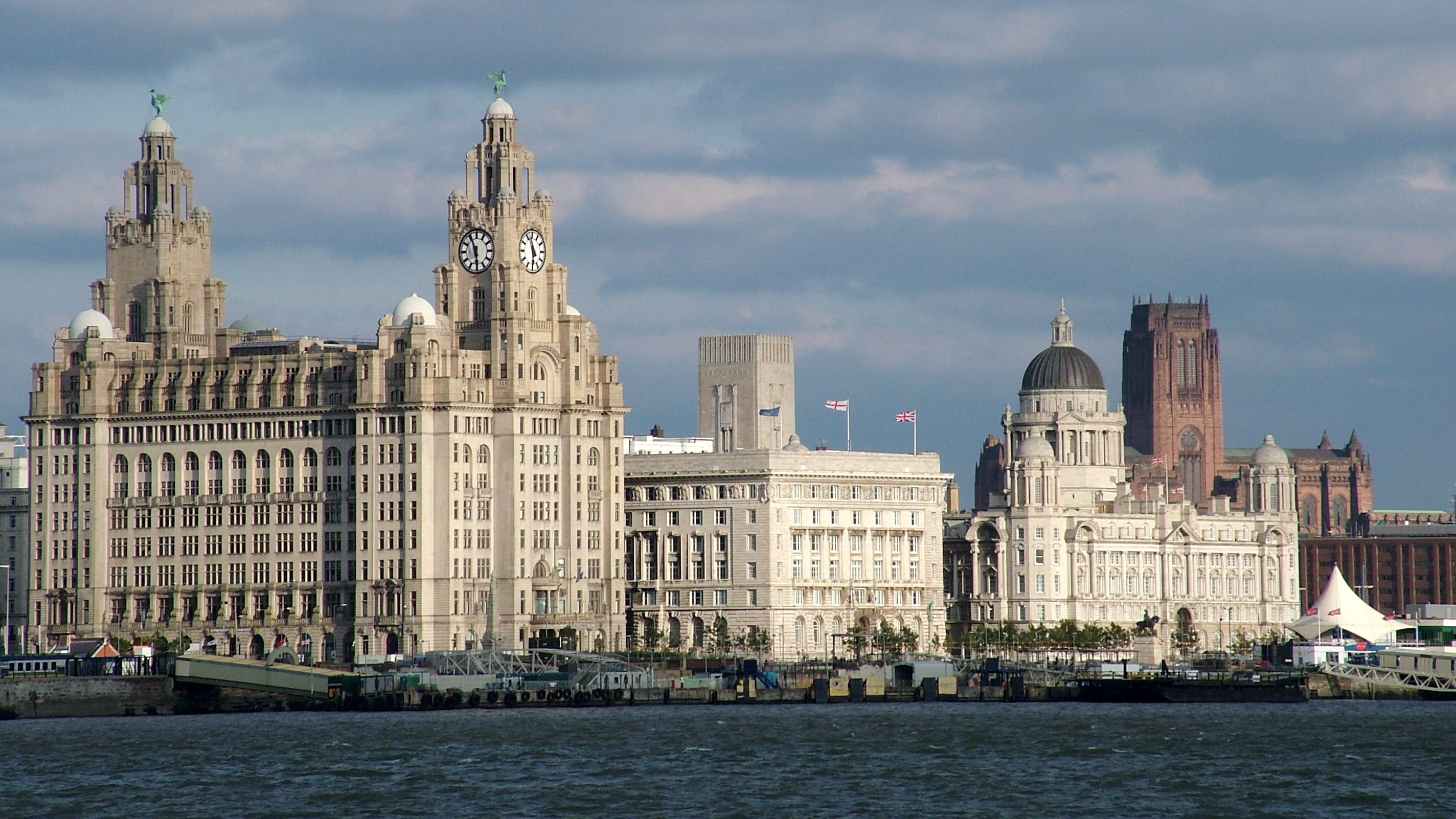
Liverpool Pier Head and Liverpool Cruise Terminal

Sea ferries depart from the following ports: Port of Liverpool (Gladstone Dock), Bootle to Dublin (P&O Ferries) and Douglas on the Isle of Man (Isle of Man Steam Packet Company); Birkenhead (Twelve Quays Terminal) to Belfast and Dublin (Norfolkline Irish Sea Ferries – former Norse Merchant Ferries); Fleetwood to Larne (Stena Line) in Northern Ireland; and Heysham Port to Douglas (Isle of Man Steam Packet).

The world's first hovercraft service started on 20 July 1962. Operated by British United Airways, the experimental Rhyl to Wallasey Hovercoach service operated for eight weeks between Leasowe (Moreton) and Rhyl in North Wales.

Leeds and Liverpool Canal has run into Liverpool city centre, via Liverpool Canal Link at Pier Head, since 2009.

Liverpool Cruise Terminal in the city centre provides long-distance passenger cruises; Fred. Olsen Cruise Lines, MS Black Watch and Cruise & Maritime Voyages MS Magellan all use the terminal to depart to Iceland, France, Spain and Norway.

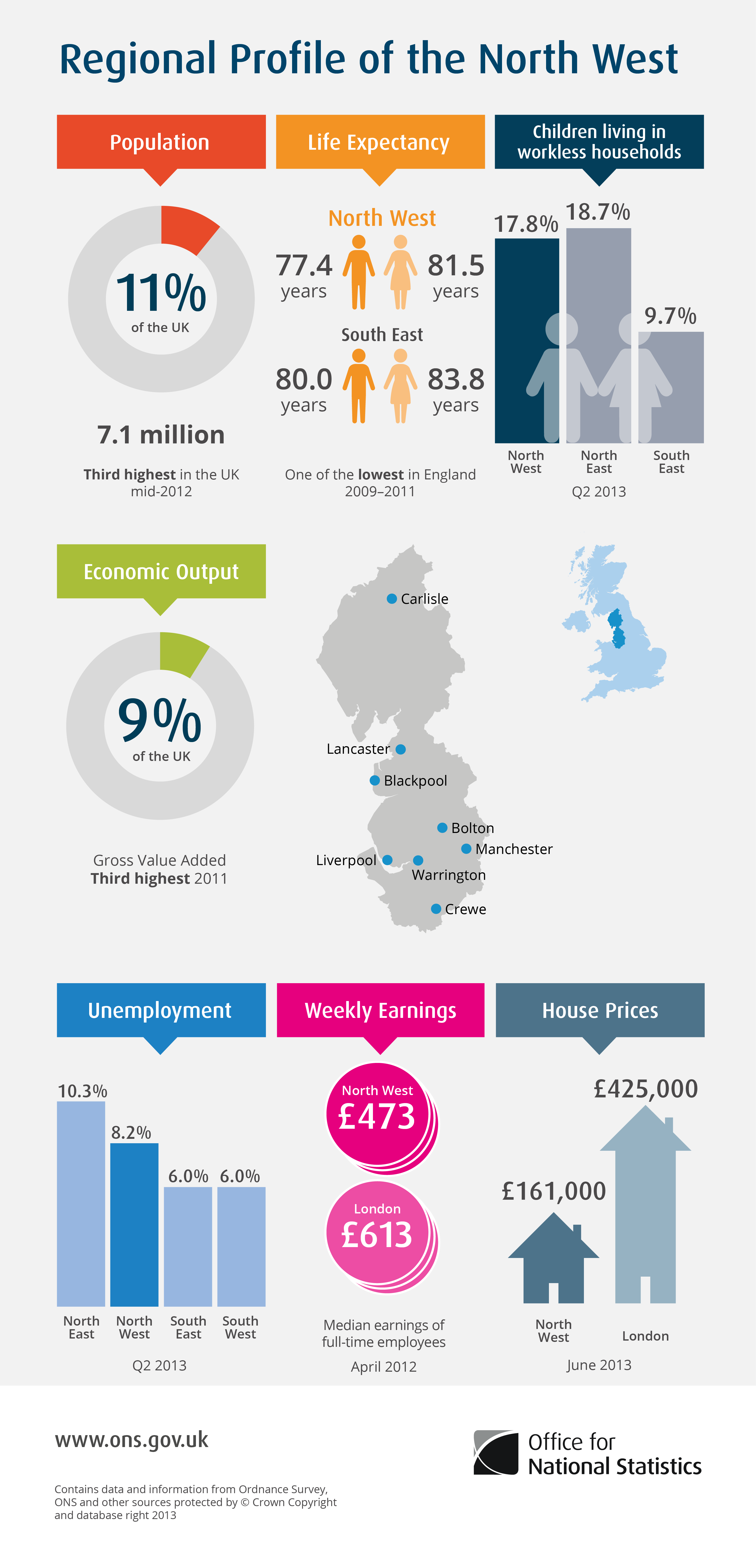
Regional profile of the North West

== Economy ==
The North West is historically linked with the textiles industry, mainly before the mid 20th century. The Greater Manchester region produces the most economic output according to GVA in 2014 with £57,395m, followed by Merseyside £28,257m, Lancashire with £27,668m, Cheshire £25,803m and Cumbria with £10,747m.

According to research by Cushman & Wakefield in 2008, Manchester is the second best city to locate a business in the UK whilst Liverpool is the eleventh best city. The Financial Times stated that the North West economy, led by the redevelopment of Manchester and Liverpool, is a genuine rival to "overheated London".

The area's electricity, formerly looked after by MANWEB and NORWEB, is now looked after by ScottishPower Energy Networks and United Utilities respectively. The Morecambe Bay gas field provides 6% of the UK's natural gas.

=== Cheshire ===
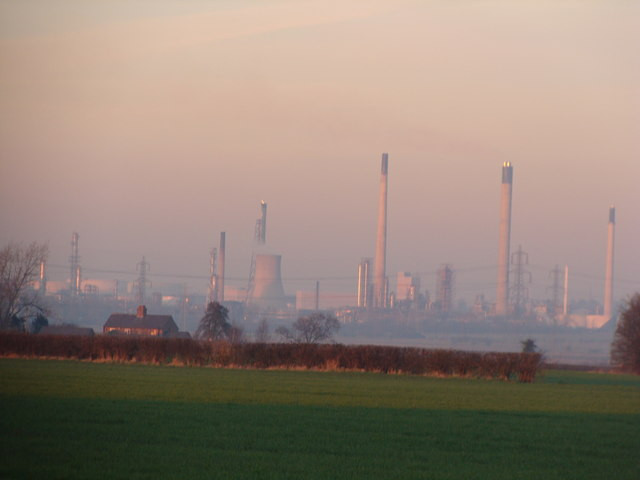
Essar Energy's Stanlow Refinery, the UK's second largest refinery after Fawley, looking north-east from Wervin

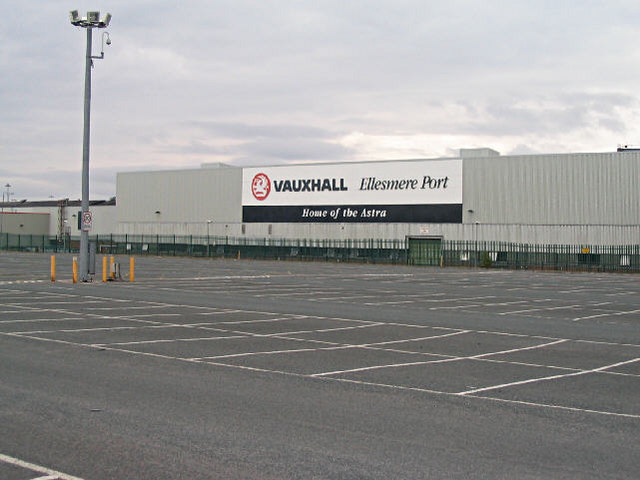
Vauxhall's plant in Ellesmere Port exports 88% of its cars, although many of the components are imported, and has made over 5 million since 1962, also making the Vectra from 1995 to 2008; it makes 686 a day (two a minute, 100,000 a year) and the latest model was designed by Mark Adams and Malcolm Ward. Three million Astras have been sold in the UK since 1979, and featured on the Top Gear test track until 2015; the production is split with the Opel Manufacturing Poland site at Gliwice in southern Poland; the Corsa is made at Opel Zaragoza in north-east Spain, with 3-door versions at Opel Eisenach; the Insignia is made at Opel Rüsselsheim

Cheshire is linked with the salt industry. AstraZeneca, the fifth largest pharmaceutical company in the world, has a manufacturing site in the north-east of Macclesfield on Hurdsfield Ind Est (former ICI Pharmaceuticals) off the A523, where it makes Zoladex (goserelin); it was formerly ICI until June 1993 when it became Zeneca. Vauxhall, home of the Astra, is on a former airfield next to the M53, and Essar Energy (former Shell, partly in Thornton-le-Moors) are in Ellesmere Port. Industrial inspection organisation SGS UK is based on junction 8 of the M53 at Rossmore Business Park. Innospec (former Octel) is west of the refinery near junction 9 of the M53 (A5032); Innospec also has a site at Widnes (former Aroma Fine Chemicals) which makes Lilestralis. Encirc Glass (former Aventas group) make glass bottles to the east of the refinery at Elton; the Shell Technology Centre Thornton on the southern side of the railway, off the A5117 and the M56 Hapsford Interchange on the east side of the refinery, closed in 2014; to the east is the large site of CF Fertilisers UK (former Shellstar) who make the Nitram brand of fertiliser.

Lex Autolease, the UK's largest vehicle leasing company, is in the east of Chester, towards Hoole. Ball Packaging Europe is based on the A483 at Chester Business Park, near the A55 junction in Eccleston, which has a main office of Marks & Spencer; east of M&S, south of the A55 bypass is Sira, which issues ATEX product approvals. To the north at Dunkirk at the end of the M56 on the A5117, is Max Spielmann (including the former Klick) in Lea-by-Backford; further north at Capenhurst, next to the railway, Urenco Group have a uranium enrichment plant, partly in Ledsham. Sandbach used to be home of ERF and Edwin Foden Trucks. Tata Chemicals Europe (former Brunner Mond) next to the A530, next to the railway, is partly in Lostock Gralam just west of Northwich; there is another main site at Winnington on the A533 north-west of Northwich. British Salt is in Middlewich; Bisto used to be made there by Centura Foods (RHM), but production moved to Worksop (Nottinghamshire) in 2008. Henkel UK (the consumer adhesive division, maker of Pritt and Sellotape) is on the Winsford Ind Estate in the east of Winsford, home of the UK's largest salt mine at Meadowbank run by Salt Union, who are owned by Compass Minerals.

Mornflake is in Crewe on the B5071, Focus closed in July 2011, and Orion Optics make telescopes. Bentley (owned by Volkswagen since 1998) have their main plant in the west of the town between the A530 and A532, next to the railway to Chester. Crewe Works built the HST (Class 43) power cars, and now carries out maintenance for Bombardier. Unipart Rail is on the B5071 next to Crewe railway station. Bargain Booze is at the A532/A5020 roundabout in the east of the town, and further along the A532 Whitby Morrison are the world's leading manufacturer of ice cream vans. Air Products have a main HQ off the A534 in central Crewe near the Virgin Trains training academy. UK Fuels (fuel cards) are off the A532, north of Crewe railway station.

BAE Systems Global Combat Systems at Radway Green, Barthomley north of M6 junction 16, south of Alsager makes small arms ammunition, and Freshpack make pies next to the A5011 towards the east of the town; Twyford Bathrooms (owned since 2001 by the Finnish Sanitec) are off the B5077, but their enormous factory next to the railway closed in early 2011, with production moving overseas. Amec is south of Knutsford at Booths Hall off the A537, now the HQ of Amec Foster Wheeler; also in the town is Edmundson Electrical. Between Knutsford and Wilmslow in Mobberley off the B5085, close to the southern approach of Manchester Airport, is a large site of Harman Technology (known worldwide as Ilford Photo). Four Seasons Health Care is in central Wilmslow; north of the town on the A538 is a large £60m mass spectrometry research site of the Waters Corporation, built in 2014 on a former research site of Ciba-Geigy Pharmaceuticals (who formed Novartis in 1996), next to the River Bollin. Pets at Home is next to the railway at Handforth near Wilmslow and the Stockport boundary near Handforth Dean (A34). Boalloy Industries are on Radnor Park Ind Est in West Heath in west Congleton north of the A534/A34 junction, make trailers, and pioneered the Tautliner curtain-sided trailer design in the 1970s. Reginox UK (kitchen sinks) are in the north of Congleton; Siemens Industry Automation & Drive Technologies UK make variable-speed drives, exporting 98% of production, on Eaton Bank Trading Est near the River Dane. OK Diner is in Macclesfield (previously in Middlewich); Tullis Russell at Bollington makes the paper for all Royal Mail stamps, and has done for many years.

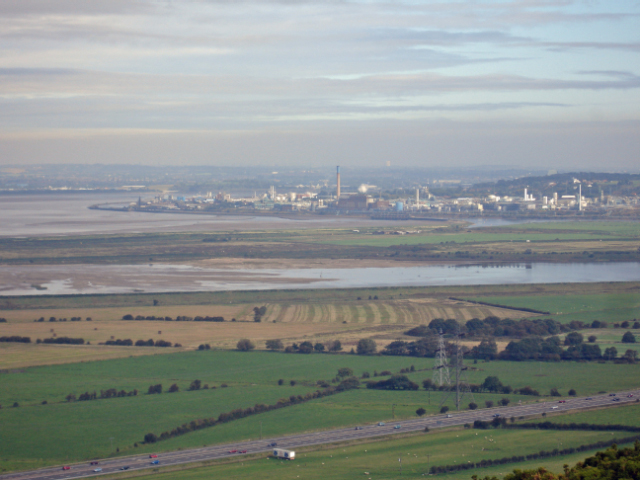
Ineos ChlorVinyls at Runcorn in 2006; the UK chemicals industry is worth £57bn, with 180,000 people in around 3,000 companies

Ineos Fluor (the site was previously owned by ICI Chemicals) is at Runcorn which produces chlorine and caustic soda from Cheshire salt, piped from Lostock Gralam, south of Northwich; most of the chlorine in the UK comes from this plant; it also makes hydrofluoroalkanes (HFAs) for metered-dose inhalers and the anaesthetic halothane. There is Ineos Chlor and Ineos Vinyls. BNFL and its subsidiary Sellafield Ltd (former British Nuclear Group), and ABB are based in Daresbury near Runcorn, although most of BNG's operations take place at Sellafield in Cumbria. Daresbury is also home of the EMMA and ALICE FFAG accelerators. Diageo bottles Guinness at Preston Brook, between the A56 and A533, and nearby Saint-Gobain UK make Isover insulation. Kawneer UK (part of Alcoa) make architectural aluminium systems (curtain walls) off the A533 at Astmoor in north Runcorn. APPH (aircraft undercarriage) is based on the A558 on Manor Park in Sandymoor near TALL Security Print, the UK's leading provider of business cheques; further to the west is Yokogawa Electric UK. Schachihata UK (Xstamper and Artline) are based at Ashville Ind Est on the A557 at junction 12 of the M56 next to the Weaver Navigation and the 3,200 ft Weaver Viaduct south of Runcorn towards Sutton Weaver. Croda Enterprise Technology Group does its important R&D in Halebank, Widnes, south of Ditton. The Thermphos factory on the A557 south of Widnes closed in 2013.

United Utilities is based in the west of Warrington at Lingley Mere Business Park in Great Sankey, next to the St Helens boundary; in Lingley Green to the south on the A57 was the former HQ of North West Water; to the north, Amazon have a fulfilment centre. Unilever makes Persil and Surf washing powders next to the Bank Quay railway station; next door between the A5061 and River Mersey is PQ Silicas (former Joseph Crosfield). Cogent Skills (the UK's SSC for science) is in the south of Warrington off the A5060, on the other side of the railway from Bank Quay. New Balance UK is at Centre Park, off the A5060 in south-west Warrington, with a factory at Flimby, on the Cumbria coast. Konftel UK is at Thelwall. ASICS UK (sportswear) is on the Gemini Business Park, off the A574 in Burtonwood and Westbrook north of Warrington, next to the M62 and a large IKEA and M&S on Gemini Retail Park; next door is KYB UK, part of the world's largest (Japanese) manufacturer of shock absorbers; nearby is Krauss-Maffei UK (injection moulding machines); AlphaBiolabs provide the DNA paternity testing for The Jeremy Kyle Show on Carina Park in Westbrook.

Burtonwood Brewery (the HQ of Thomas Hardy Burtonwood, who developed Britain's alcopop drinks in the 1990s) is on the B5204 in the west of Burtonwood, towards St Helens borough. Birchwood Park has to be the main technical business park in the North West. The Bank of England MPC's Agency for the North West is on Birchwood Park near the HQ of GB Oils, the UK's leading fuel oil supplier (owned by DCC), and the operator of Gulf Oil petrol stations in the UK. Electricity North West (the North West's distribution network operator) is near by, with ESR Technology, who did work for the Philae space probe and owns the National Centre of Tribology at Whittle House in Risley, with TalkTalk Business to the west, near International Nuclear Services and Sellafield Ltd at Hinton House. Terberg Matec UK (Dutch) supply lifts for bin wagons next to M62 junction 11. Also west of the park is Nuvia UK (part of Soletanche Freyssinet). Betfred (having the largest turnover in the region—£13.3bn) is at the western end of Birchwood itself, next to the M6 and Birchwood railway station. Birchwood was built on the former ROF Risley.

=== Lancashire ===
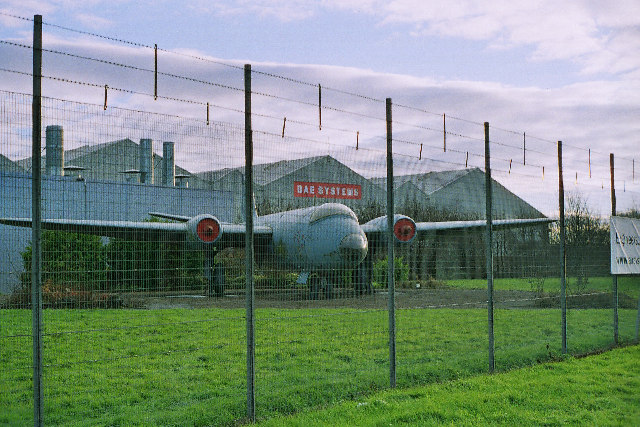
English Electric Canberra gate guard at BAE's Samlesbury site

The ONS 2010 Annual Business Survey states that 30.3% of jobs in the British aerospace industry are based in Lancashire. The main private employer in the county is BAE Systems Military Air & Information who have two sites east and west of Preston for the manufacture of military aircraft. Samlesbury (4000 employees) makes air-frames; the front fuselage, canards and tailfin of the Eurofighter. Warton, BAE Systems' main site (former English Electric, then BAC), is in Bryning-with-Warton (6500 employees). BAE builds a Eurofighter every two weeks (takt time). Rolls-Royce make turbofan blades in Barnoldswick (950 employees). Nearby Weston EU manufacture components in Foulridge (250) and engine maintenance contractor Euravia are in Kelbrook (100). Safran Aircelle make engine nacelles and thrust reversers in Burnley (800), and mostly make thrust reversers for the Trent 700. GE subsidiary Unison Engine Components (320), are the largest of several others in the area.

Westinghouse (BNFL) make nuclear fuel at the Springfields site at Salwick, off the A583 in Newton-with-Clifton. The boiler firm BAXI have a factory in the south of Preston, and next door, Assystem UK (engineering consultancy) are off the B5258 in Bamber Bridge. AB InBev have a brewery on the B6230 in nearby in Samlesbury (former Whitbread, and brews Stella Artois); further east the BAE Systems factory is between the A677 and A59, mainly in Balderstone. To the north-east of Preston, Bodycare Group make toiletries at the Red Scar Business Park on the B6243, near junction 31a of the M6, where Goss International UK make printing presses. Webb Ivory (charity fundraising, owned by Findel plc) is off the A6 in Avenham, in the south of Preston. Alstom Transport (former GEC Traction) is at TLS Preston; company's main Trafford Park site closed in the early 1990s. Bosal was the UK's leading manufacturer of car exhausts on Walton Summit, between the M6 and M61 until they closed operations. The Pilkington European Technical Centre is at Lathom.

Voith Paper has a site in Stubbins, at the northern end of the M66, off the A676. Silentnight (600) is in Barnoldswick, where Hope Technology make mountain bike components; nearby Johnson Matthey makes automotive catalysts. At Whitworth on the A671, BCH engineer equipment for the food processing industry (Nestlé and Mars).

Brands originating in Lancashire include TVR, Reebok, Jaguar Cars and Warburtons. Leyland Trucks manufactures several truck ranges from Leyland, home of Enterprise plc, and where Albion Automotive (part of American Axle) make crankshafts at Farington. CCA Occasions makes greeting cards on the B5253 on the Moss Side Ind Estate and nearby Dr Oetker makes Chicago Town and Pizza Ristorante pizzas (330); 40% of the UK's frozen pizzas are made here, and the Pizza Ristorante brand, solely made in Lancashire, is Italy's best-selling frozen pizza with 20% of the Italian market. Nearby, Nitecrest is the UK's leading manufacturer of gift, payment, loyalty and phone cards, and exports most of its products.

Walker's make Monster Munch at junction 5 of the M58 on the Pimbo Ind Est in Up Holland; nearby SCA Hygiene has their Skelmersdale Mill which makes kitchen towel, with Uretek UK (polyurethane). To the east is Frederick's Dairies in East Pimbo, who make Cadbury's ice creams, near TAAG Steelwork, who built the Olympic Energy Centre. To the west, Turtle Wax Europe are next to M58 junction 4 on Gillibrands Ind Est. The Co-operative Bank are administered from Delf House in the centre of Skelmersdale.

Victrex make PEEK (a thermoplastic) just north of Blackpool at Cleveleys. Next door, AGC Chemicals Europe, owned by Asahi Glass Co., makes ETFE (fluon) for electrical wire insulation, and silica gel off the B5268 at Thornton-Cleveleys. HTI Group in Fleetwood makes toys and owns Barbie.

Ennis Prismo make traffic white line products at Chorley; Walmsleys is a paper manufacturer off the A675 in Withnell. DXC Technology (former CSC) have sites in Chorley and Preston. Along the M65, Fort Vale based in Simonstone (near Burnley) (300) are a world leader in valves and fittings for road tankers. Close by, office furniture manufacturer Senator International (800) are the largest in the UK in their field. Off the A646 in Habergham Eaves, east of Burnley, is AMS Neve, a renowned manufacturer of audio mixing desks. Telecoms provider Daisy Group (former Pipex, 400), based in Nelson is one of the UK's fastest growing companies, on Lomeshaye Ind Est north of M65 junction 12 in Brierfield; Cott Beverages (former Macaw Soft Drinks before 2006) is off junction 12 of the M65 in Brierfield, west of Nelson, next to Pendle Water. Jura UK (Swiss coffee machines) is off the A6068 in Colne. At Horrocksford near Clitheroe, Hanson Cement have their large Ribblesdale Cement works, next to the River Ribble, which supplied construction of the Liverpool Metropolitan Cathedral. Bensons for Beds (previously in Burtonwood near Warrington) and Sleepmasters (both owned by Steinhoff International) are in the north of Accrington, off junction 8 (A56) of the M65, near Huncoat railway station. Kleeneze (owned by Findel plc) is based with Express Gifts off the A678 in Clayton-le-Moors off the M65 Hyndburn Interchange between Blackburn and Burnley, north of Accrington with a main distribution centre off the A679 in Church on the other side of the M65 in the west of Accrington, with both sites next to the Leeds-Liverpool Canal. Off the A678 near the River Calder in Altham (north east of Clayton le Moors) is Senator who claim to be the UK's largest manufacturer of office furniture; Simon Jersey designed and made the Team GB clothing for the 2016 Olympics opening and closing ceremonies.

In Blackpool is the Federation of Small Businesses (FSB), Amber Taverns, Premium Bonds and National Savings and Investments. Dennis Eagle makes bin wagons in Marton; Tangerine Confectionery are based at Little Marton, with another factory to the east, just south of the main government building site. The Service Personnel and Veterans Agency (MoD's pensions, former Veterans Agency) is off the A585 in east Blackpool at the B268 roundabout at Norcross in the south of Anchorsholme. The NS & I office of Blackpool is on the A583, off the M55 Marton Circle, in Little Marton on the eastern edge of the town. Disability Living Allowance, replaced by Personal Independence Payment, is administered by the DWP, with the Disablement Services Authority at Warbreck House west of the A587, accessed from the B5265 and next to Bispham High School. At the end of the M55 (junction 4) off the A5230 in Westby-with-Plumptons is DWP's large Peel Park Control Centre, on the Blackpool boundary. Amber Taverns is near Blackpool North railway station. To the north of Peel Park, next to the Clifton Retail Park in Mereside is Glasdon (roadside furniture), off the A583. Burton's Biscuit Company (owned since November 2013 by the Ontario Teachers' Pension Plan) have many head office functions in Layton, Blackpool and a factory off the B5124, in the south of Warbreck, next to the railway line, which makes Maryland Cookies, Cadbury Fingers and Wagon Wheels (with another main factory in Torfaen, south Wales); it is the UK's second largest biscuit maker and was founded in Blackpool.

Crown Paints is in Darwen (500). DS Smith have the Hollins paper mill just south of junction 4 of the M65, off the A666 in Darwen, which is set to close. Across the M65 to the north Apeks make diving equipment at Blackamoor. Graham & Brown at Blackburn make fancy wallpaper, next to the Leeds & Liverpool Canal, and off the A6077 is CWV (Coloroll and Crown Wallpaper); Capita Group runs TV Licensing in the middle of the town; Lucite International has its main plant on the A666 in the north of the town centre, where it makes Lucite; this site, under ICI Acrylics, manufactured the perspex for wartime aircraft canopies from 1940, becoming Ineos Acrylics from 1999 until 2002 and the company is the world's largest manufacturer of methyl methacrylate (MMA); ICI Acrylics invented the process to make perspex in 1936; the granular form of Perspex was known by ICI as Leukon. Tensar International, invented and manufacture geogrids for construction, off the A6077 near junction 5 of the M65 in Blackburn near the B6231 roundabout; nearby is Castle Metals UK; also on the Shadsworth Business Park is Evertaut, who make auditorium seating.

=== Greater Manchester ===
Tyco UK is based on the A62 in Newton Heath. Joseph Holt's Brewery is off the A665 next to Strangeways prison; Boddingtons' Strangeways Brewery closed in 2006. Avecia (biotechnology) is off the A664 in the Hexagon Tower in Blackley near the North Manchester General Hospital. North of the hospital at Crumpsall was B3 Cable Solutions, the UK's only former manufacturer of telecommunications cables, based next to the River Irk. Heineken (former Scottish & Newcastle) have their large Royal Brewery in Moss Side next to the A5103, north of the B5219 junction. Admiral Sportswear are in Northenden. British Textile Technology Group is in Didsbury. Timpson is in Wythenshawe; Sharwood's used to make their sauces there until Premier Foods moved production to Bury St Edmunds in 2008. Duerr's make honey and jam at the Roundthorn Ind Estate in Wythenshawe, off the A560.

Shell UK (retail) was at Rowlandsway House in Wythenshawe until 2011 and has moved to Brabazon House nearby on the Concord Business Park; Royal Dutch Shell, by revenue ($458bn) in 2010, was the world's largest company, with ExxonMobil second. Electrium make their Wylex fuse boxes on the B5168 and B5166 in Wythenshawe, north of the Sharston Interchange of the M56; to the west is a plant of the Heimbach Group. PZ Cussons (formerly in Cheadle Heath) is off the Airport Interchange of the M56, with a manufacturing site on the former Agecroft Colliery next to the railway in Pendlebury, Salford, off the A6044. Nearby in Moss Nook is Franke UK, the world's largest manufacturer of domestic sinks and Simon Carves (process engineering), and Renold plc is an international chain company based on the B5166, off the Manchester Airport spur of the M56. Amazon have a fulfilment centre off the A538 west of the airport, south of the Hale Four Seasons Roundabout of the M56.

N Brown Group (JD Williams) is one of Britain's main clothing manufacturers and retailers, and based in central Manchester near the A62/A665 junction and Sir Owen William's Daily Express Building, and owns well-known brands. Gazprom Energy is on Quay Street (A34) towards the River Irwell.

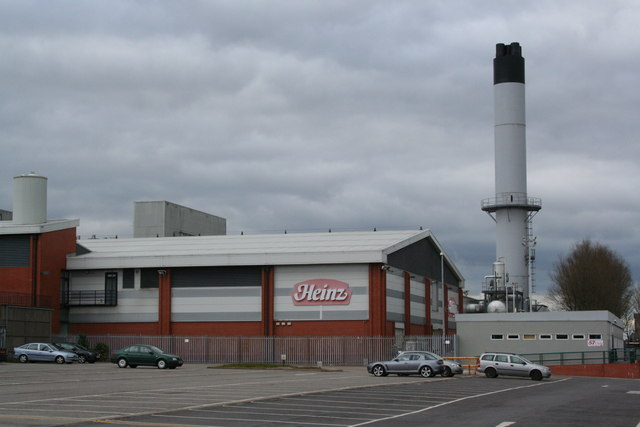
Heinz, although based in Hayes in Middlesex, has the largest food processing complex in Europe at a 55-acre (22 ha) site at Kitt Green in Wigan, which produces 1.4 billion cans of food each year; it is accessed to the east of the Orrell Interchange of the M6 (A577); the 38-acre Heinz NDC is next door

JJB Sports is at Marsh Green near the River Douglas, set up by former footballer Dave Whelan who owns Wigan Athletic F.C.; also in Wigan are The Tote, Shearings Holidays and Girobank, and R&R Ice Cream (former Richmond Foods) make De Roma ice cream. Contitech UK (part of Continental AG) makes industrial belts off the A587 in Bickershaw, between Wigan and Leigh. Bulldog Tools make spades on the A577 in the east of Wigan. Electrium (formerly Volex Accessories) make electrical wiring off the A578, north of Westleigh. Ainscough Crane Hire is the UK's largest lifting services company on Bradley Hall Est in Standish, next to the WCML. Off the A580 at the A573 roundabout at Golborne, at Stone Cross Park south of the borough, is Alpla UK (plastic bottles) and Sofology (furniture).

Makro is in Eccles. Akcros Chemicals are off the A576. Cooper & Stollbrand make premium garments next to the River Irwell on Cambridge Ind Est in Lower Broughton. On the Bolton boundary in north of the borough in Little Hulton, Eaton Transmissions closed in 2006, with production moving to Tczew in Poland. Colgate closed its toothpaste factory in October 2008, on the A5066, and is now called Soapworks, near the former Pomona Docks in Ordsall. Pentair Safety Systems have a main site in Linnyshaw, west of the M61 Worsley Braided Interchange.

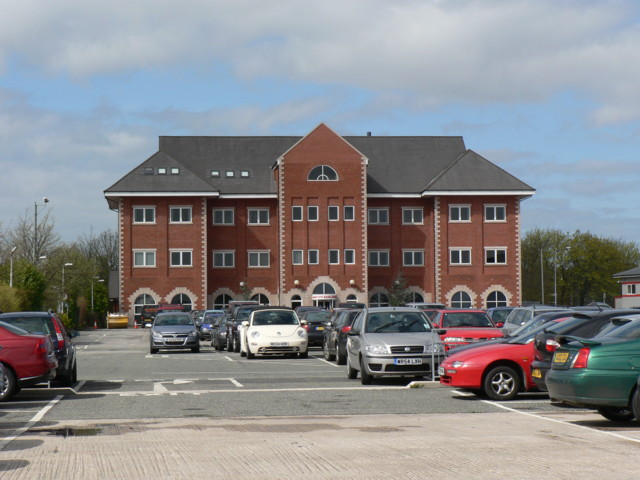
Head office of Warburtons in Bolton in April 2006

Sock Shop is in Bolton, and MBDA (Matra BAe Dynamics Alenia, owned 37.5% by BAE Systems) makes missiles in Lostock near the Horwich Link Interchange of the M61; it is the historic main manufacturing site of Britain's aircraft-launched missiles; MBDA Lostock is MBDA's largest production site (of the whole company) and makes the air-to-air ASRAAM (found on the Eurofighter) and the air-to-surface active radar homing Brimstone (missile) designed by GEC-Marconi in the 1990s, and previously made the Rapier surface-to-air missile, and the De Havilland Firestreak, Britain's first (infrared homing) air-to-air missile. Cash Generator is south of the borough off the A575 in Farnworth, north of the Salford boundary; Cosatto (nursery equipment) is on the A575 Moses Gate, in East Farnworth. dabs.com, an e-commerce site owned by BT, is in Wingates (Westhoughton), west of Bolton off the A6 and the Horwich Link Interchange of the M61, next to Krones UK (German) on the Wingates Ind Est, which produces machinery for bottling manufacture; nearby is a hologram factory of De La Rue. Benteler UK (carbon steel tubes) is next to the River Croal off the A58 at Tonge Moor next to Astley Bridge in north Bolton and to the south PMT Industries makes paper drying machines. Severfield, opposite MBDA in Lostock) built steel structures for Olympic Stadium, the Velodrome, the Basketball Arena, the ArcelorMittal Orbit, and the Handball Centre, as well as numerous well-known steel structures around the UK, such as Aspire, and the Clyde Arc.

BAE Systems built aircraft in Chadderton and Woodford in Stockport (former Avro) off the A5102 (the eastern half of the airfield is in Cheshire East); the BAe 146 (Avro RJ) was manufactured at Woodford until 2001. Senior Aerospace BWT at Adlington, Cheshire off the A523 at the eastern end of Woodford Aerodrome, make air-conditioning systems for business jets. DNV UK (engineering standards), National Tyre Service (at the A5145/A6 junction) and Britain's first internet bank Smile (founded by the Co-op in 1999) are nearby in Stockport. Wienerberger UK, the Austrian brick company who own Baggeridge, are based at the Cheadle Royal Business Park at the B5358/A34 junction, as is Umbro, and Agilent Technologies UK (biomedical equipment), and Chiesi UK (respiratory medicine). DBS Civilian HR (the former Pay and Personnel Agency) is off A555 at Cheadle Hulme. Adidas UK is in Bramhall Moor, Hazel Grove off the A5143, and further south is NXP Semiconductors UK which make MOSFETs; on the opposite side of the railway is MAN Diesel & Turbo, which is next to Stepping Hill Hospital. BASF UK is in Handforth next to the A34/A555 junction on the Cheshire boundary. Thales Underwater Systems (former Ferranti Thomson Sonar Systems) is in Cheadle Heath. McVitie's make their Jaffa Cakes, Penguins and chocolate digestives at a factory in South Manchester on the A6. JYSK UK (mattresses) are off the A523 near the A6 junction. Pilkington's Tiles are based on Bredbury Park Ind Est, near a main factory of Renold Chain on the A6017 off the M60 Bredbury Interchange; also in Bredbury off the A6017 is Janome UK (sewing machines).

Russell Hobbs is in the south of the borough at Failsworth on the A62, west of the M60 Hollinwood Interchange; nearby to the Hollinwood railway station in Oldham, Trinity Mirror (former Mirror Colour Print before 2006) prints the Mirror and Independent for the north of England, as well as the Manchester Evening News and Liverpool Echo. Diodes Semiconductors (former Zetex) based off the A669 in Alder Root, Chadderton, is a leader in LED lighting. Money Controls, in Royton in the north of the borough, make currency detectors, being owned by Crane Payment Solutions, and Pulse Home Products (makes Breville, owned by Jarden in Florida) is on the B6195. BAE Chadderton was next to the M60 and B6393, and a railway, and closed in March 2012; later a repair facility, it built the Lancaster and Vulcan. Mölnlycke Health Care UK on the B6194 in central Oldham make surgical clothing and masks. Shop Direct have their Shaw National Distribution Centre.

Revolution Bars Group (former Inventive Leisure before December 2014), who own the Revolution pub chain, are in Ashton-under-Lyne. Kerry Foods at Godley Hill (Hyde) on the A57 make Richmond and Wall's sausages. Robertson's (now owned by Premier Foods since it was bought from Rank Hovis McDougall) moved their marmalade (Golden Shred) and jam processing from Droylsden to Histon (Cambridgeshire) in October 2008. Brother Europe (typewriters and sewing machines) are at Hooley Hill on the A6017 next to Guide Bridge railway station, east of the Snipe Interchange of the M60. Outdoor Sports Company owner of Mountain Equipment, Ronhill (running clothing), and Sprayway, are based off the B6468 in Hyde.

Cotton Traders are in Altrincham, and Dulux Decorator Centres is in West Timperley. Britannia Hotels is on the A538 in Hale near the A5144 junction. LyondellBasell UK (former Basell Polyolefins), makes polypropylene resin at Carrington Works, off the A6144 (former motorway) in Carrington, off the Carrington Interchange of the M60, which was set up to exploit the British-invented Catarole process, later bought by Shell in 1955. Ethel Austin is in Altrincham (formerly Knowsley until 2010). Virtalis (virtual reality) is off the B5397 near Dane Road Metrolink station in Sale. S2Blue, a radio jingles company run by Steve England, is off the A6144 near the B5165 junction, in Ashton upon Mersey in the former studios of Alfasound (having moved from Leek in 2013). HomeForm Group, owner of Möben Kitchens, Sharps Bedrooms and Dolphin Bathrooms until 2011, was on the A56 in Old Trafford. Itron UK (flow metering) have a plant at the A56/A5014 junction at Gorse Hillin Stretford; further along the A5014 there is Kelloggs UK HQ next to the Old Trafford cricket ground. Regatta and Craghoppers are on Barton Dock Road (B5211), near the Trafford Centre (the base of The Peel Group), on the other side of the A5081. Holt Lloyd, known as Holts, the largest car care company in the world in the 1980s, now owned by Honeywell Consumer Products Group, is based on Barton Dock Road (B5211), at Merlin Park on the south of Trafford Park, off the M60 Lostock Circle. On Trafford Park near the A576 Centenary Bridge SCA makes household tissue products (owned by P&G before 2007), and next door is P&G's Manchester Plant which makes its Pampers nappies. The Fragrance Shop is based near Trafford Ecology Park, on Trafford Park. Soreen is made south of Trafford Park, next to the Bridgewater Canal off the A5081 Parkway Circle roundabout; next door UK Data Capture (Lockheed Martin) processed all the 2011 census data.

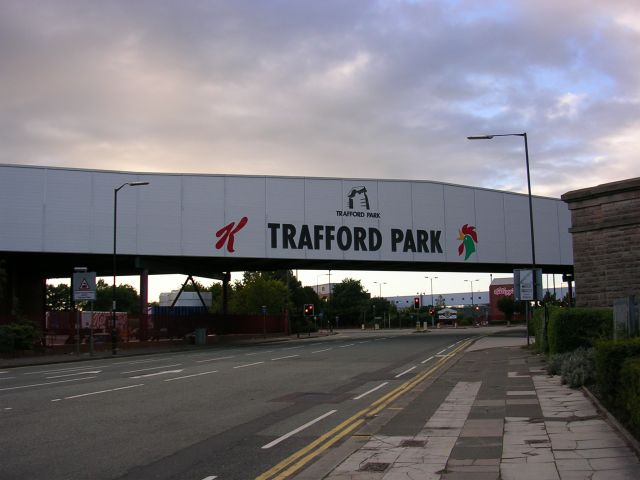
Kelloggs in Manchester, looking north along the A5181 next to GMFRS's Stretford Area Command HQ; the site is the largest producer of cereals in Europe

Kelloggs is in Trafford Park (Manchester); to the north Adidas have their European distribution centre, and nearby TDG was on the industrial estate, until bought by Norbert Dentressangle in 2011. DHL Freight UK is at Manchester International Freight Terminal, west of the Old Trafford football ground. Chemtura (chemicals, former site of Ciba-Geigy) is between the A576 and B5214 towards the north end of the industrial park. Lucchini UK (railway wheelsets and axles) are on Trafford Park off the B5214, and are a main supplier for UK trains. Ocean Finance is on Trafford Park (previously in Tamworth). Hot Animation, who made Bob the Builder, are on Hanover Business Park in the east of Altrincham, in Broadheath; to the south towards the Bridgewater Canal, across a former railway, on the Altrincham Ind Est, Girlguiding UK run their trading service.

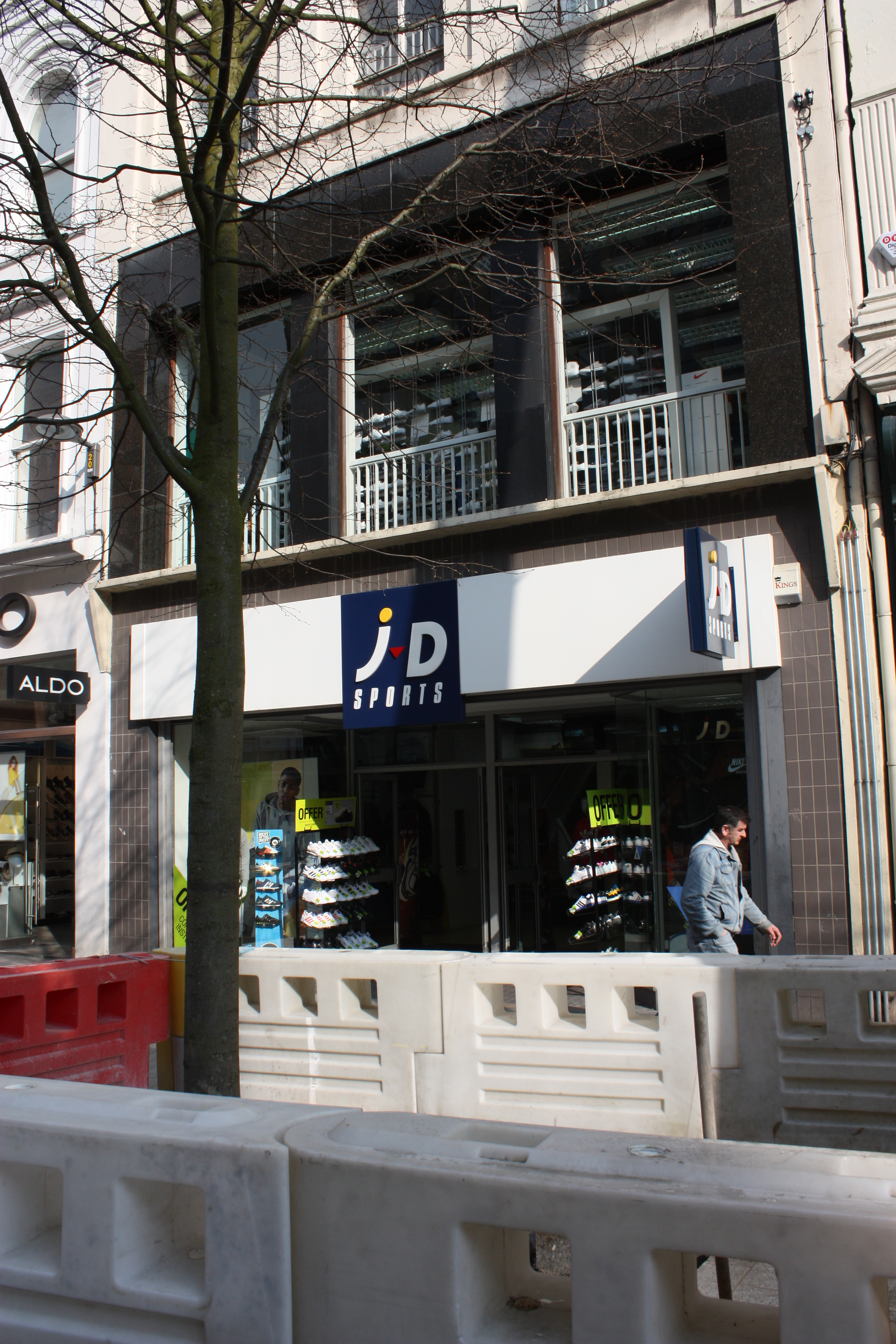
JD Sports (in Belfast), the largest company in Bury

JD Sports is west of the Pilsworth Interchange of the M66 in Unsworth south of Bury; Birthdays is west of the Heap Bridge Interchange; Tetrosyl Group Ltd, UK maker of car care products are at Walmersley, off the A56 and also at junction 2 (A58) of the M66. At A6053/A56 junction in Redvales, to the south of Bury is Melba Swintex, a main supplier of street furniture—traffic cones and barriers, claiming to be a world leader. Milliken make airbags on the A58, south-west of Bury.

PTG (Holroyd Machine Tools) are based off the M62 Milnrow Interchange; nearby off the A6193 are Takeuchi Manufacturing UK (construction equipment). Premier Foods make Sarson's on the A669 near Mills Hill railway station in Middleton; on the opposite side of the railway Vita Group make polyurethane foam (Vitafoam, the largest supplier in the UK). Voith Paper have a servicing centre on the A576, west of Middleton town centre. The Co-op is based in Manchester and Rochdale. Minky Homecare (household cleaning) and Freudenberg Household Products UK is in the centre of Rochdale off the A671. Zen Internet is at Sandbrook House on Sandbrook Park at end of the A627(M) off the A664 in Stoneyfield in the south of Rochdale, and next door is the HQ of The Co-operative Pharmacy. We Buy Any Car is at Castleton near the A664, in the south-west of Rochdale, the same site of Carcraft. Guenther Bakeries (owned by Golden West, part of RHM, until 2005) in the south of Heywood, east of the large Heywood Distribution Park, makes the bread buns for McDonald's (with another site in Banbury).

=== Merseyside ===
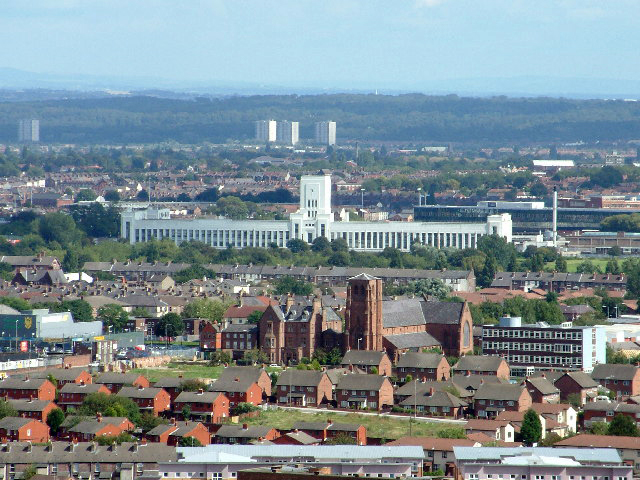
The 1938 Littlewood's Building next to Wavertree Technology Park, on Edge Lane, looking east from Liverpool Cathedral

Pilkington is in St. Helens; Knauf Insulation UK, is south-west of the town centre. Alumasc Exterior Building Products is on B5204 near St Helens Junction railway station in Sutton. Kalzip, a division of Tata Steel Europe, make aluminium roofs in Haydock; GCE Group UK, who make medical gas controllers and diving regulators, are on the A599 near the M6 Haydock Island; to the north-west is a large Sainsbury's RDC; further up the A49 before Ashton-in-Makerfield and Byrchall High School is Speedy Hire, the biggest hire firm in the UK. Vimto is owned by Nichols plc of Newton-le-Willows, although actually made by Cott Beverages in north Leicestershire.

Littlewoods are in Garston, who are owned by the Shop Direct Group in Speke. Princes, Johnsons Cleaners UK, Maersk Line UK, the Beetham Organization, John West Foods, Bibby Line, Home Bargains, the Royal Liver Assurance and T J Hughes have their headquarters in Liverpool. Towards Aintree, Jacob's and their crackers are historically based, and also make Twiglets at their site at Hartley's Village in Fazakerley, and nearby is Sportech PLC, owner of the football pools; Trigon Snacks make Big D (peanuts) in Aintree, and have done since the 1970s on the Greylaw Ind Est off the B5187, near the Archbishop Beck Catholic Sports College. HMRC's (former Inland Revenue) National Insolvency Unit is at Regian House (previously at Queen's Dock) opposite Liverpool James Street railway station and next to Liverpool's Armed Forces Careers Office. The Criminal Records Bureau is on Prince's Dock, since 2013 part of the new Disclosure and Barring Service (with the former ISA in Darlington). The Defence Bills Agency was at Mersey House next to St James railway station, now part of DBS Finance.

Tangerine Confectionery makes its Princess marshmallows off Edge Lane (A5047) in east Liverpool, west of Wavertree Technology Park. Home Bargains are off the A580 west of junction 4 of the M57, on the Knowsley boundary at Stonebridge Park. JF Renshaw (Renshaw Napier), who have a Royal warrant, make cake icing on the A562 next to the Liverpool Women's Hospital in Edge Hill; 90% of the UK's marzipan comes from this factory. At Speke on the A561, west of the JLR plant, partly in Knowsley, Novartis make vaccines such as Fluvirin, and directly to the south MedImmune (owned by AstraZeneca) makes components of influenza vaccine (FluMist); Briggs Automotive Company is on Speke Hall Ind Est, with HP Chemie Pelzer UK (automobile acoustics). At Hunts Cross on the northern side of the railway line, the large Eli Lilly Speke Operations manufacturing plant produces antibiotics such as Capreomycin, and in 1981 produced the world's first biosynthetic product, by manufacturing biologic insulin, and has also produced biosynthetic human growth hormone since 1985; the plant was owned by The Distillers Company after the war until 1962, where it made penicillin and later made thalidomide. Near the A561/A562 junction, the NWDA-funded National Biomanufacturing Centre was built in 2006. On the south side of the A561 in Speke is Estuary Commerce Park. Further to south is Prinovis UK and B & M (previously in Blackpool) on the Liverpool International Business Park; on the former Speke Aerodrome is Shop Direct near the National Biomanufacturing Centre.

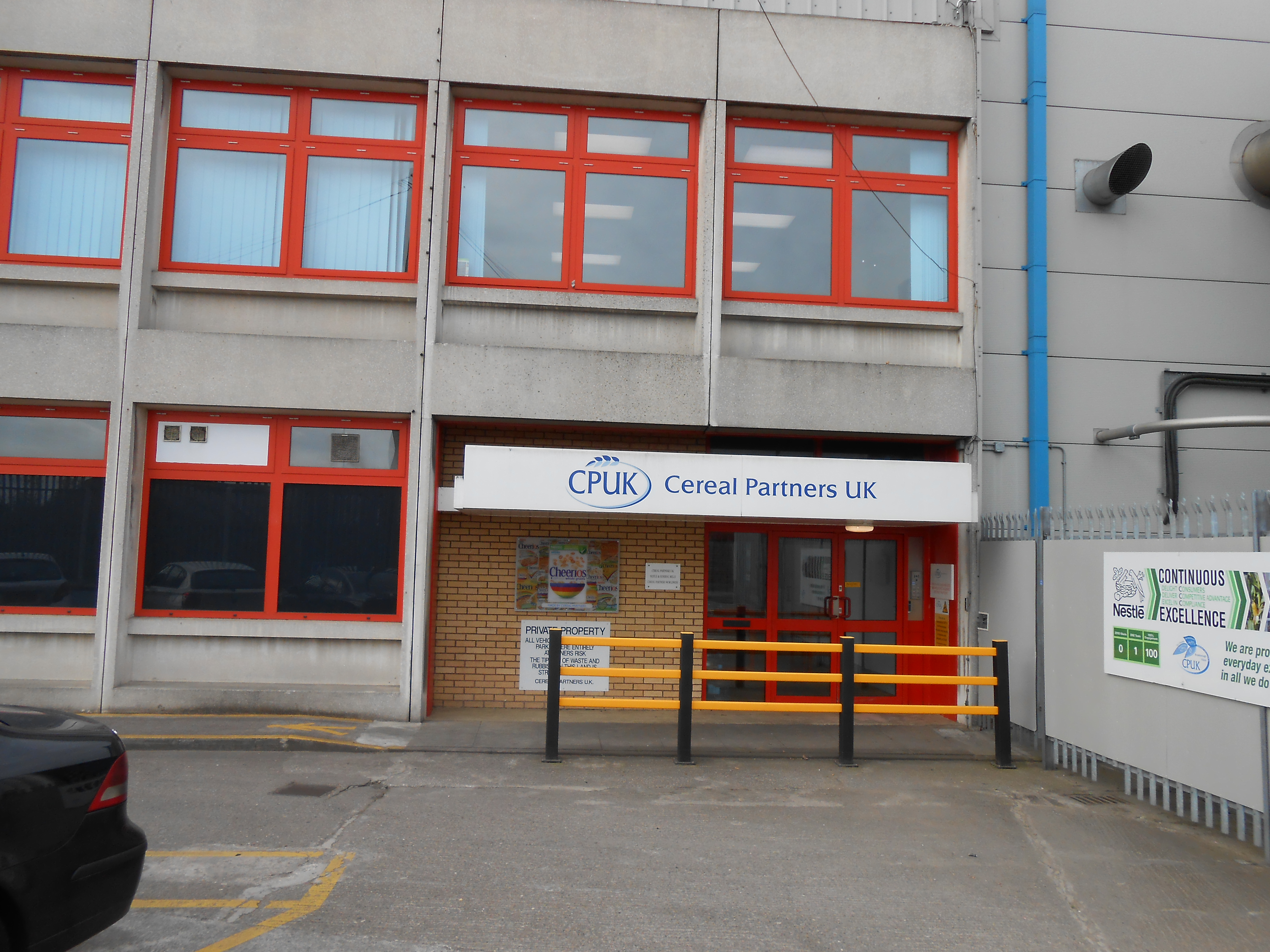
Cereal Partners UK (Nestlé) make Cheerios and Golden Nuggets on the A41 opposite Port Sunlight at Bromborough, also the base of CSM UK, the baking ingredients company based at a former Unilever Stork margarine site.

Jaguar Land Rover has 166 acres of its main production site (formerly owned by Ford) in Halewood, making the Freelander and Range Rover Evoque. Getrag Ford Transmissions, make 400,000 automatic and manual transmissions next door to the east of JLR's Halewood plant, for Ford, Volvo and Mazda vehicles. Magna Decoma, west of JLR Halewood and east of Novartis, make car interiors and exteriors. Dairy Crest makes Vitalite and Utterly Butterly on the A5207 in Kirkby, off the M57 Randles Farm Interchange, opposite a former site of Ethel Austin; to the east of Dairy Crest is Yorkshire Copper Tube, Britain's main manufacturer of copper tubing, owned by Italian KME Group; Counterline make foodservice counters on Knowsley Business Park; Clarke Energy is on the A5208. Further north on the estate next to the A5208 is QVC UK's distribution centre, with all three in Kirkby. Further north, next to the Lancashire boundary is Goodrich Actuation Systems on the Huyton Ind Est (in former Huyton Quarry) on the north-west side of the M62 Tarbock Island (off the A5080) in Tarbock. Next door Halewood International, who make Lambrini, Red Square, Lamb's Navy Rum and some alcopops, are in Whitefield Lane End, in the south of Huyton at the M62/M57 junction. Belling Ltd (owned by Glen Dimplex) is in Whiston, next to the large Whiston Hospital; Glen Dimplex Whiston is the UK's only manufacturer of cookers, around 350,000 a year (Stoves plc before 2001), and also owns LEC fridges. Manesty manufactures medicine tablets off the B5194 on the Knowsley Business Park. Nationwide fashion retailer Matalan has its head office and main distribution centre in the north of the Knowsley Ind Est (at Skelmersdale until 2014); the Knowsley Ind Estate is all on the former ROF Kirkby. Camelot Group have their Liverpool Prize Payout Centre on the Kings Business Park on the A57, west of the M57 Forest House Interchange.

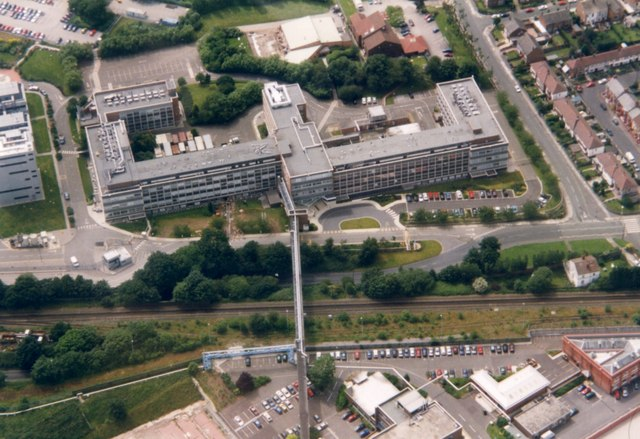
Unilever Research Laboratory at Port Sunlight (Bebington) looking west, next to the Wirral Line

Typhoo tea is made in Moreton off the A551 next to Moreton railway station, and on the same site there is Manor Bakeries (Premier Foods, former Lyons Cakes, before April 1995) who make mini rolls, and a factory of Burton's Biscuit Company closed in December 2011 which made Cadbury's biscuits (Cadbury Fingers) and Wagon Wheels, where they still have a chocolate refinery. Bristol Myers Squibb UK have their main research laboratories east of the Moreton bakery, near Leasowe railway station. CML Group (part of Teledyne) makes composites and aircraft components off the A41 at Bromborough near Eastham Country Park; to the south is Einhell UK (power tools). Stiebel Eltron UK (heat pumps) nearby, are near Meyer Prestige who make cookware (who also own Circulon and Anolon) and Givaudan UK have a fragrances factory. FMC Lithium, east of the A41 at Wirral International Business Park, makes butyllithium and other organometallic compounds. At Port Sunlight, Unilever make and research detergents and shampoo, such as Timotei and Sunsilk, as well as Comfort and Persil Liquid. Cammell Laird at Birkenhead build ships, including two Polaris Resolution-class submarines in the 1960s; on Twelve Quays off the A554 is Faiveley Transport UK (railway electrical components). RFD Beaufort (known as Beaufort Air-Sea Equipment in the 1980s) make G-suits for fighter aircraft and liferafts. Eastham Refinery off junction 6 of the M53, at Eastham in Wirral, just north of Hooton Park (in Cheshire), is owned by Nynas.

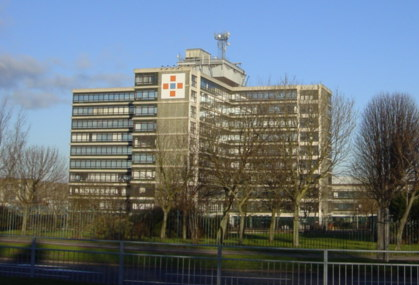
Former head office of the Girobank in Bootle; it closed in 2003; it was taken over by Alliance & Leicester in 1990; it was established in Bootle in the late 1960s with help from Hugh Baird; it was the first financial institution in Europe to be fully computerised from the start

Pontins is in Ainsdale, Sefton. HMRC at St John's House on the A5057 in Bootle, is the national office for dealing with tax for individual savings accounts (ISAs) and other savings schemes, charities (Gift Aid), non-resident trusts, and domicile status; opposite is Sefton Council's Magdalen House. Nearby to the west on the A5057, the HSE and Office for Nuclear Regulation have their head office at Redgrave Court, near the main site of Hugh Baird College. The Inland Revenue had its main office at The Triad in Bootle, next to the Strand Shopping Centre, and the site is still run by HMRC. Unipart Dorman make LED traffic lights near Meols Cop railway station in Blowick, east of Southport; to the north at Crossens, Railex make filing cabinets.

=== Cumbria ===
Royal Navy submarines and ships are made by BAE Systems Submarine Solutions in Barrow-in-Furness. The coast of Cumbria is known as Britain's Energy Coast due to the large amounts of energy being produced along the coast of the county; Sellafield is a power station which is located in West Cumbria and is a major contributor to the "Energy Coast" also, Barrow-in-Furness is major town in contributing to the "Energy Coast" with a power station (Roosecote Power Station), Gas Terminals (Rampside Gas Terminal) and an offshore wind farm (Walney Wind Farm) which is approximately 14 km (8.6 miles) west of the town's coastline with some of the largest wind turbines on Earth. On the Westlakes Science & Technology Park off the A595 south of Whitehaven, is the Nuclear Decommissioning Authority (in Herdus House).

The British Cattle Movement Service is at Workington next to Tata Steel Projects, near a site of the National Nuclear Laboratory on Derwent Howe Ind Est. Iggesund Paperboard is south of Workington, off the A596; next door is Eastman Chemical. Amcor Flexibles Cumbria (former Alcan before 2009) in the south of Workington prints crisp packets and confectionery wrappers, for distribution around the UK's factories.

The Lake District is popular with holiday makers. The Nuclear Decommissioning Authority is near Whitehaven. Lakeland, who make kitchenware, are in Windermere. Stobart Group is in Carlisle. M-Sport, the rally team at Dovenby Hall, and Jennings Brewery are in Cockermouth. James Cropper, Europe's leading manufacturer of coloured paper, is in Burneside, north of Kendal, on the River Kent near the A591. Pirelli have their main UK tyre plant (for prestige cars) on the B5299 in south Carlisle; to the south in Cummersdale next to the River Caldew, Stead McAlpin have a large textile site, formerly owned by John Lewis. BSW Timber, the UK's largest sawmilling company, has a large site north of Carlisle at Cargo in Kingmoor, next to Carlisle Kingmoor TMD on the WCML. BillerudKorsnäs had a paper mill at Beetham on the A6 next to the River Bela in the south of the county. Sealy UK make beds and mattresses on the B5031 next to Aspatria railway station in north Cumbria, west of Carlisle; next door First Milk make Lake District Cheddar. Further east along the A596, Innovia Films (former British Rayophane) have a large site at Wigton. GSK Ulverston, built in 1949 as Glaxo to produce penicillin with a new plant to be built, makes cephalosporin antibiotics including cefuroxime and ceftazidime.

== Education ==
=== Secondary education ===
Secondary schools are mostly comprehensive, but Trafford retains a wholly selective school system, and there are some other grammar schools in Lancashire, Wirral, Liverpool and Cumbria.

There are around 345,000 at secondary school in the region, the third highest in England, after South East England and Greater London. This is around three times as much as there are in North East England. For school truancy the most persistent truants are in Manchester with a rate of 7.3%, followed by Knowsley with 6.9%, and Blackpool with 6.6%. The lowest truancy rate is in South Ribble with 2.4% followed by Ribble Valley with 2.9% (both in Lancashire).

At A level in 2010, Trafford performed the best and, again like its results at GCSE, is one of the best areas in England. The lowest performing area is, again, Knowsley but followed by Rochdale. Knowsley has had some dreadful results at A-level; Halewood Academy, its last school sixth-form, closed in 2016; there is now no school-based A-level provision in Knowsley, it is provided by the Knowsley Community College. For traditional counties, Lancashire gets excellent results at A-level, being one of the best in England. Areas also performing above the England average, in order of results, are Blackpool, Warrington, Wigan, Cheshire West and Chester, Bury, Cumbria, Wirral, and Stockport. Blackpool performs not particularly well at GCSE, yet produces much better results at A level—even better than Cheshire West and Chester, and the third-best in the region.

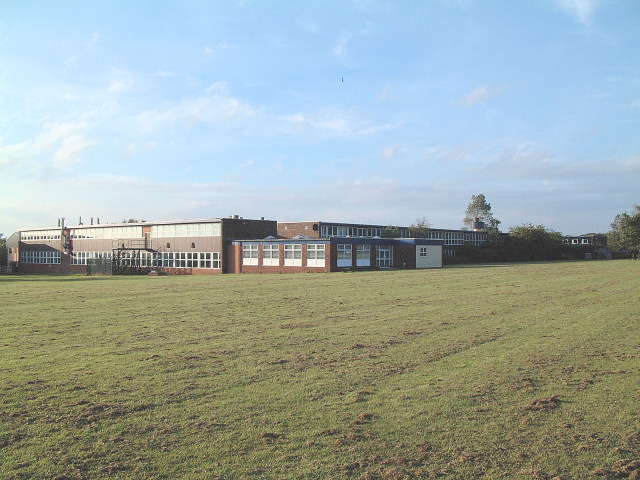
Winstanley College

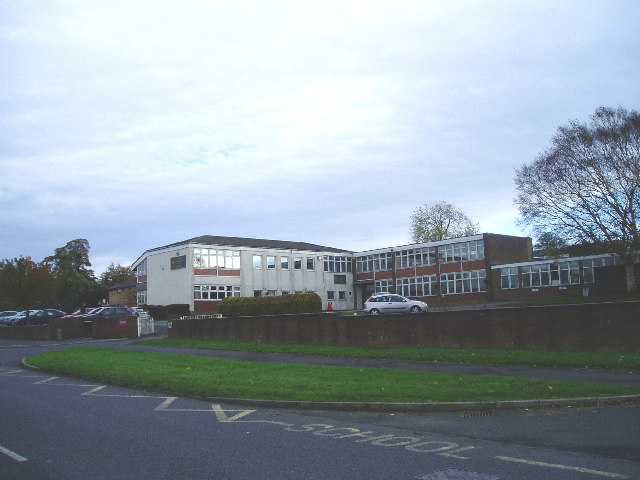
Clitheroe Royal Grammar School

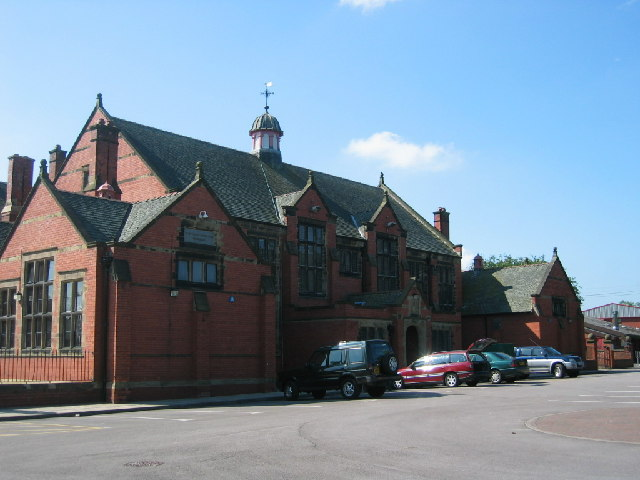
Sir John Deane's College

Top ten state schools in the North West (2015 A level results)

1. Altrincham Grammar School for Girls (1223)
2. Altrincham Grammar School for Boys
3. The Blue Coat School, Liverpool
4. Lancaster Girls' Grammar School
5. The Blue Coat CofE School, Oldham
6. Wirral Grammar School for Girls
7. Wirral Grammar School for Boys
8. Loreto Grammar School, Altrincham
9. West Kirby Grammar School
10. Clitheroe Royal Grammar School

The areas that have school children most likely to attend university are Trafford and Cheshire, followed by Wirral, Sefton, Stockport and Bury. Four of these areas are or were part of Cheshire.

=== Colleges ===
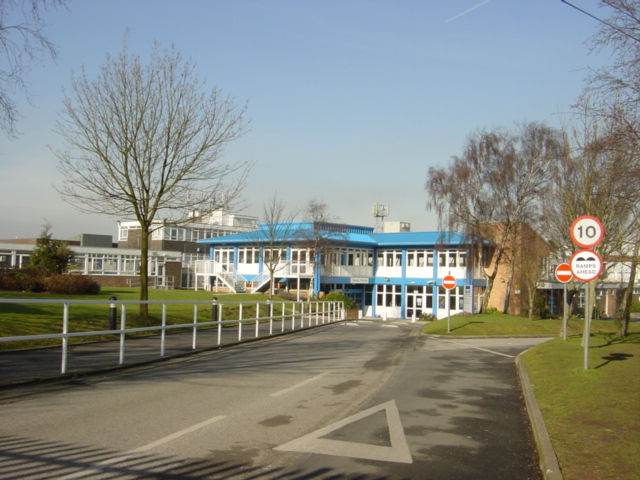
Carmel College

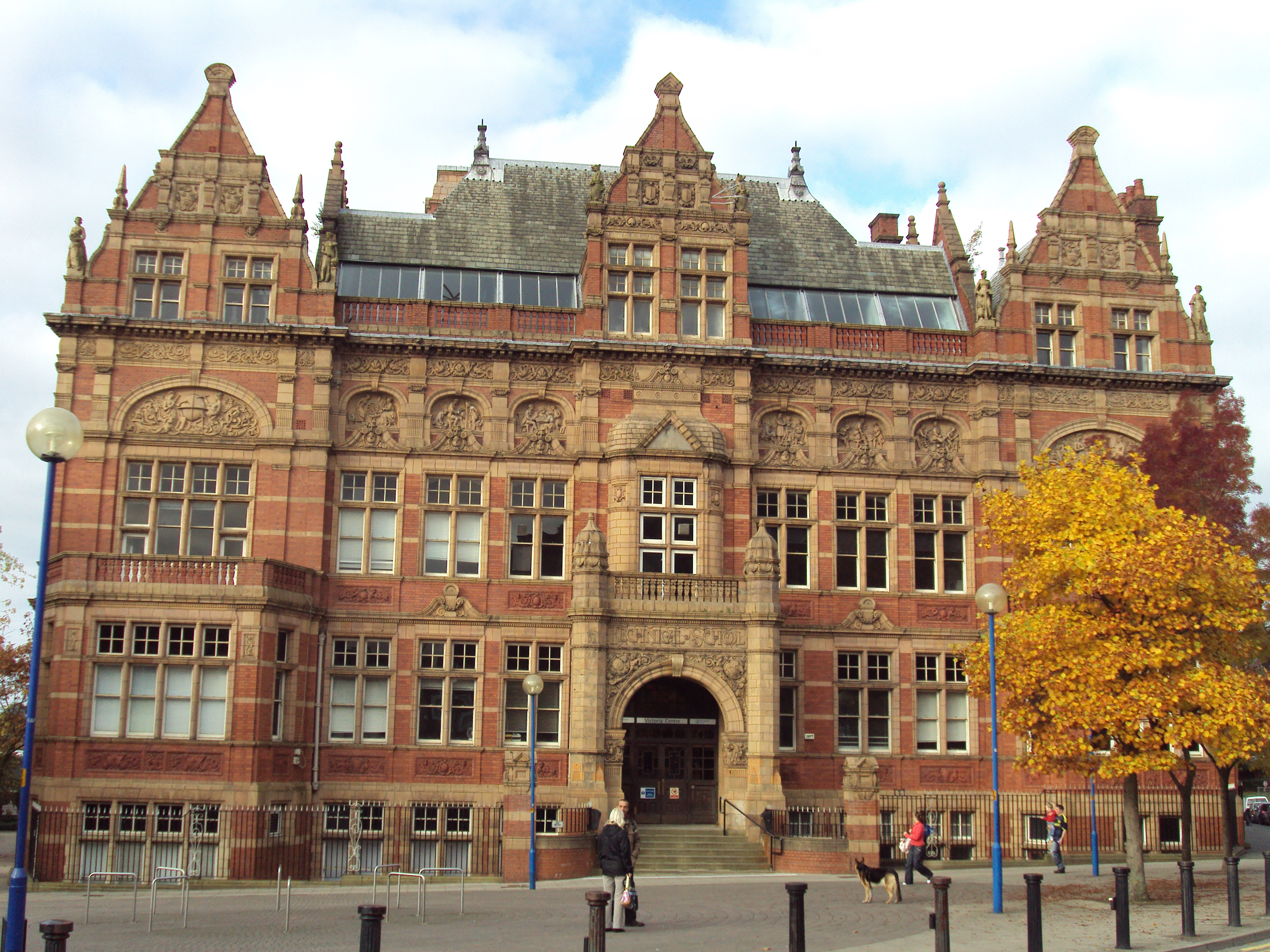
Blackburn College

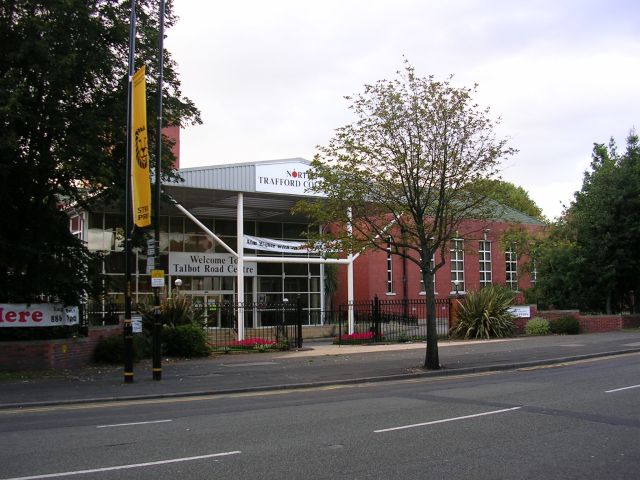
Trafford College

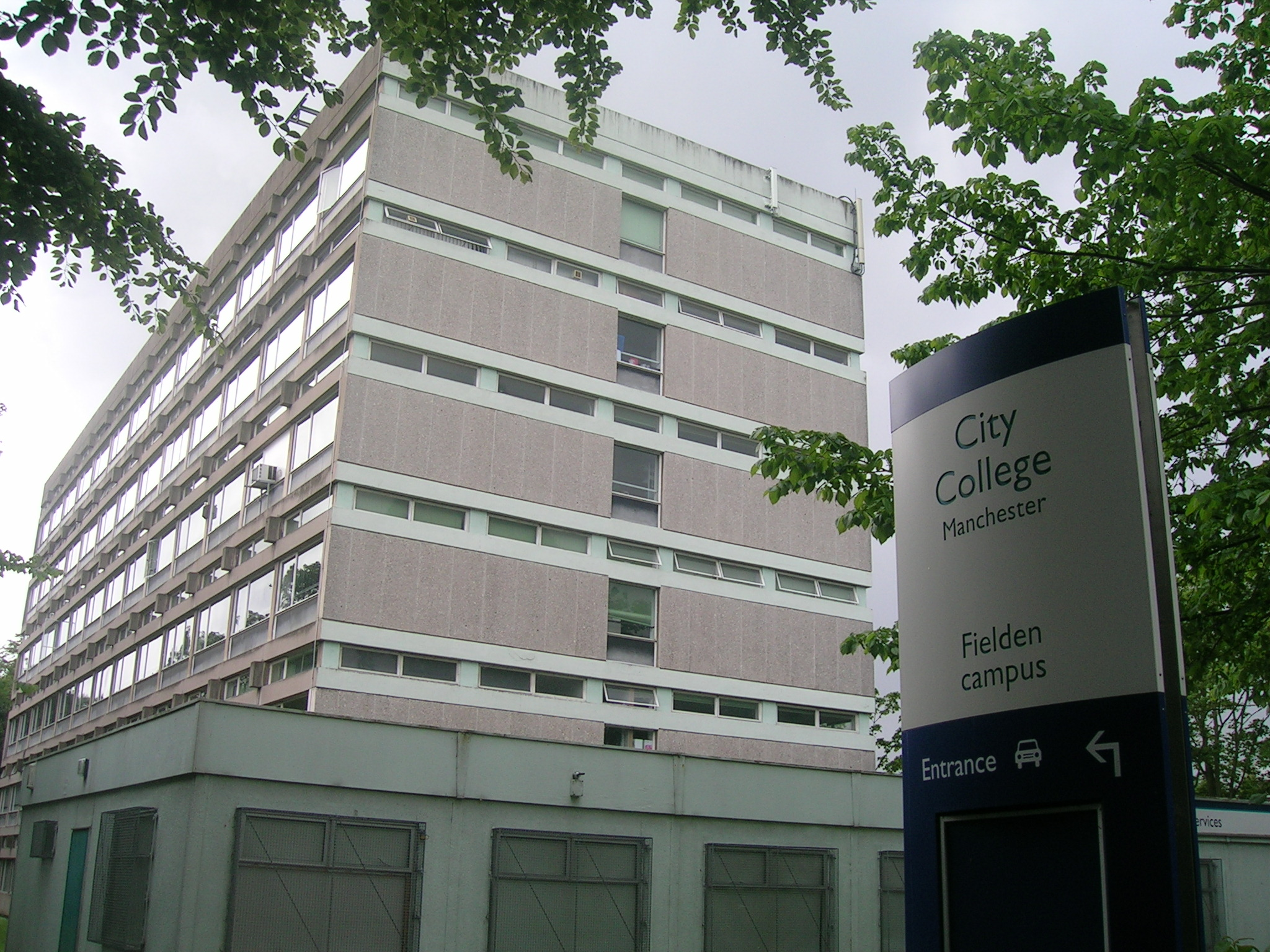
Manchester City College, Didsbury

- Aquinas College, Stockport
- Ashton Sixth Form College, Ashton-under-Lyne
- Barrow-in-Furness Sixth Form College, Barrow-in-Furness
- Blackburn College, Blackburn
- Blackpool and The Fylde College, Blackpool
- Blackpool Sixth Form College, Blackpool
- Bolton College, Bolton
- Bolton Sixth Form College, Bolton
- Burnley College, Burnley
- Bury College, Bury
- Carlisle College, Carlisle
- Carmel College, St Helens
- Cheadle and Marple Sixth Form College, Cheadle
- Furness College, Barrow-in-Furness
- Hazel Grove High School Sixth Form, Stockport
- Holy Cross College (UK), Bury
- Hopwood Hall College, Rochdale
- Hugh Baird College, Bootle
- Kendal College, Kendal
- King George V College, Southport
- Lancaster and Morecambe College, Lancaster
- Liverpool Community College, Liverpool
- Loreto College, Manchester
- Macclesfield College, Macclesfield
- The Manchester College, Manchester
- Mid Cheshire College, Northwich
- The Oldham College, Oldham
- Oldham Sixth Form College, Oldham
- Preston College, Preston
- Priestley College, Warrington
- Rainford College, St Helens
- Riverside College, Widnes
- Runshaw College, Leyland
- Salford City College, Salford
- South Cheshire College, Crewe
- Southport College, Southport
- Sir John Deane's College, Northwich
- Stockport College, Stockport
- St Helens College, St Helens
- St John Rigby College, Wigan
- St. Mary's College, Blackburn
- St. Wilfrids C of E Sixth Form College, Blackburn
- Thomas Whitham Sixth Form, Burnley
- Trafford College, Trafford
- West Cheshire College, Ellesmere Port
- Wigan and Leigh College, Wigan
- Winstanley College, Wigan
- Xaverian College, Manchester

The two main higher education colleges in the region are Blackburn College and Blackpool and The Fylde College. There are forty three FE colleges. The regional LSC was in central Manchester; this is now the SFA and the YPLA.

=== Universities ===
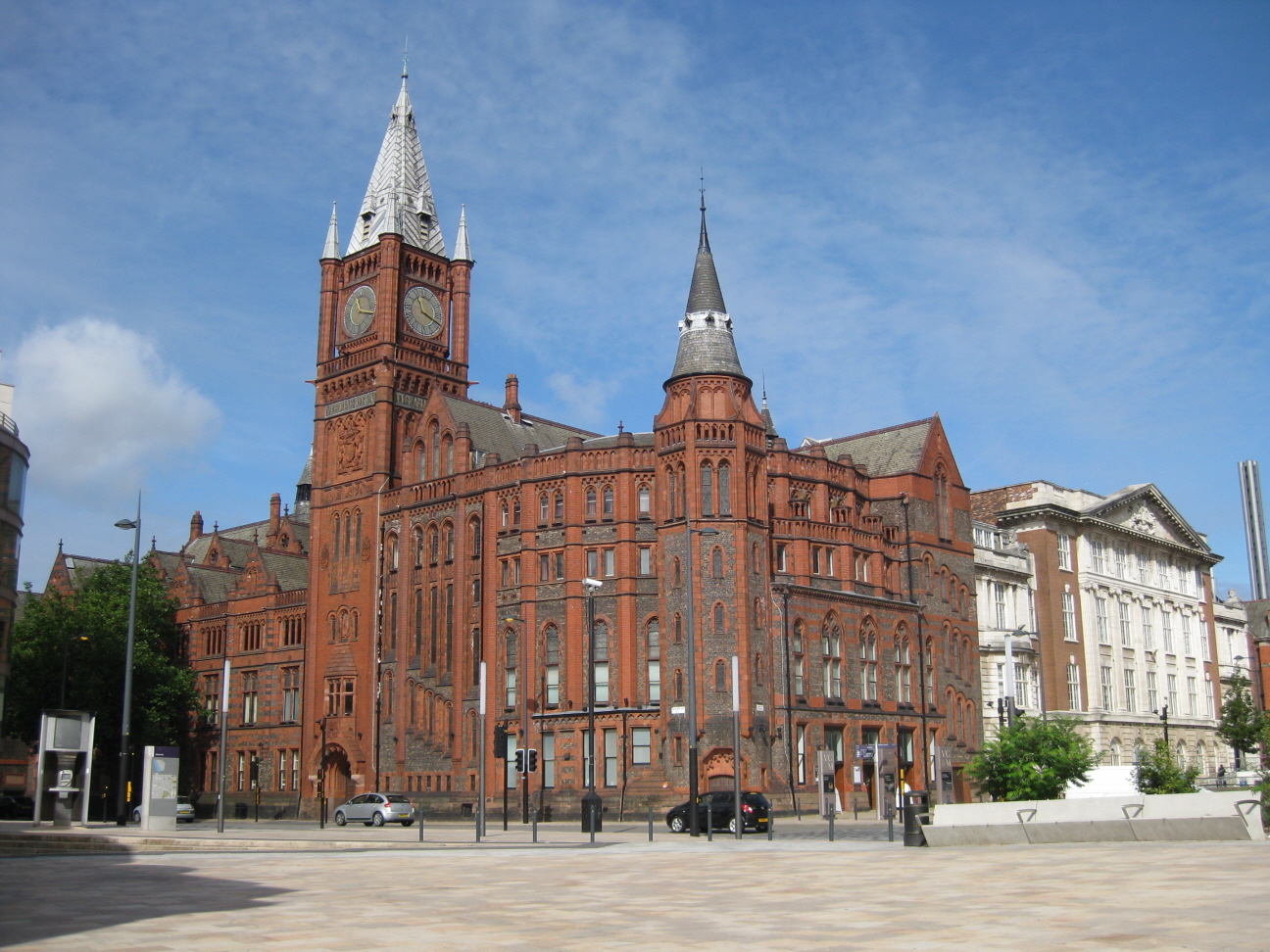
Victoria Building, University of Liverpool

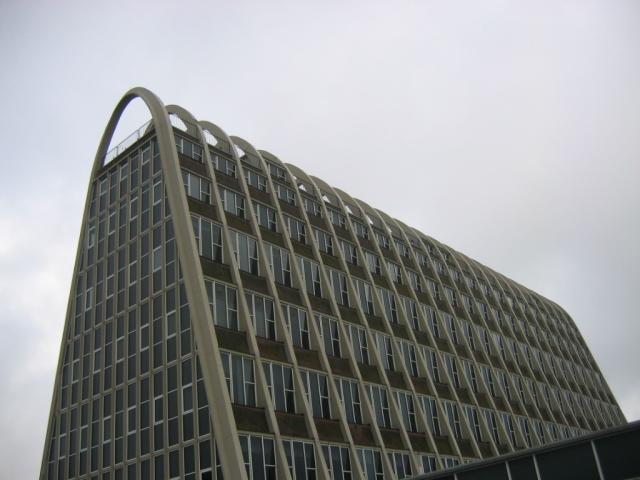
Manchester Metropolitan University's Hollings Campus – the Toast Rack

The universities in the North West are listed below:

- University of Manchester, Manchester – The largest single-site university in the UK with 36,907 students
- University of Liverpool, Liverpool – 20,765 students
- Lancaster University, Lancaster – 17,415 students
- Edge Hill University, Ormskirk – 15,645 students
- Liverpool John Moores University, Liverpool – 24,085 students
- University of Chester, Chester and Warrington – 15,095 students
- Manchester Metropolitan University, Manchester – Also one of the country's largest universities with 40,420 students – second-largest university in the region
- UCLAN, Preston – The University of Central Lancashire in Preston, 28,850 students – third-largest university in the region
- The University of Law, Chester, Manchester
- University of Bolton, Bolton – 8,540 students
- Liverpool Hope University, Liverpool – 8,205 students
- University of Cumbria – The region's newest university located across Cumbria, parts of Lancashire and London, and formerly known as the Cumbria Institute of the Arts
- University of Salford, Salford – 20,185 students

Over 60% of university students in the region are native to the region. The region with the next-highest number of students in the North-West is Yorkshire and the Humber, so approximately 80% of university students in the area are from the north of England. The region's students have the highest proportion of students from so-called low-participation neighbourhoods.

== Local media ==
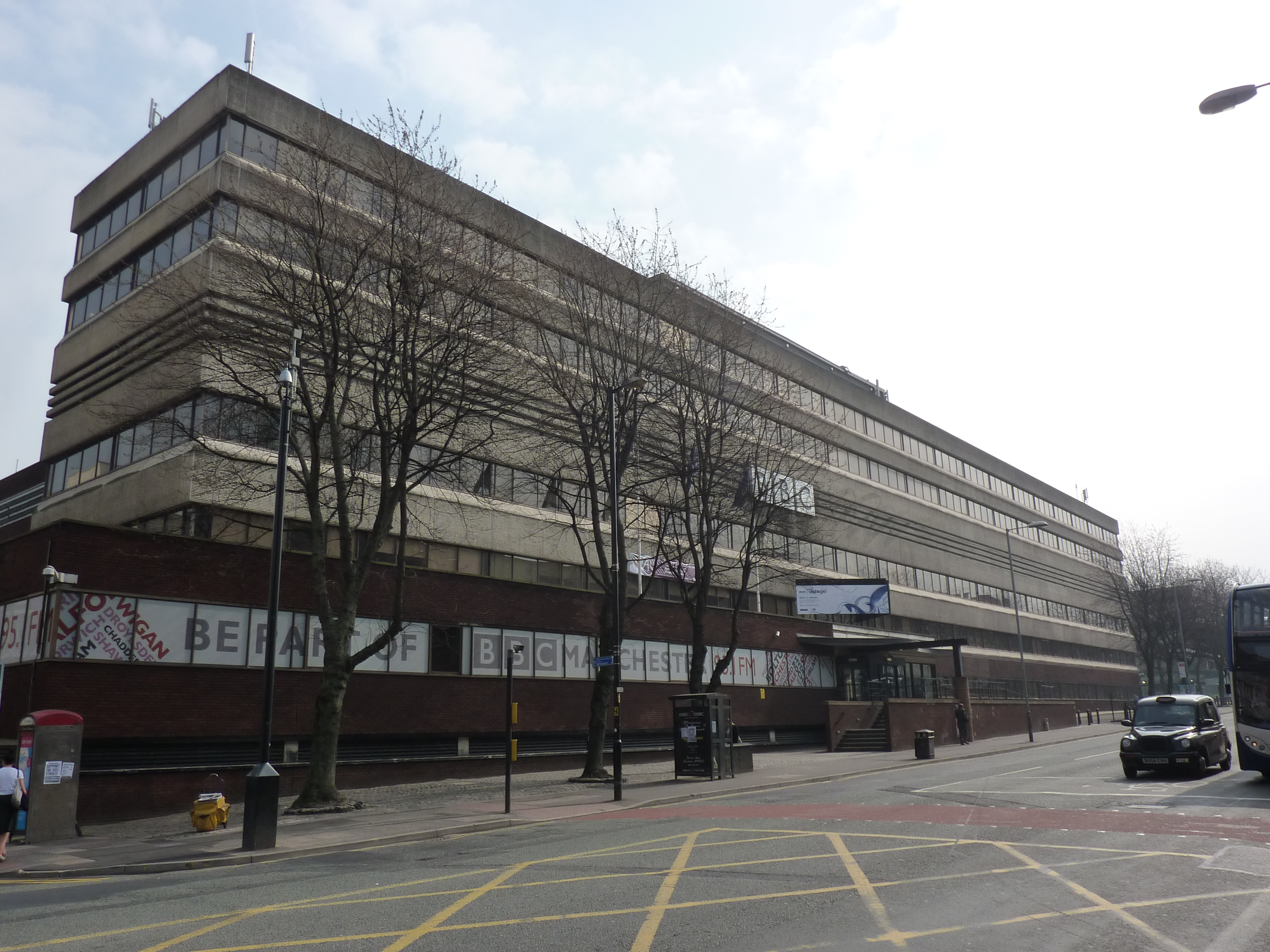
The BBC's former North West England headquarters on Oxford Road

TV

- Liverpool TV is a local television station serving Liverpool City Region and surrounding areas. The station is owned and operated by Local Television Limited and is required to broadcast 35 hours a week of first-run local programming.
- That's Manchester is a local television station serving Greater Manchester. It is owned and operated by That's TV and broadcasts on Freeview channel 7 from studios at The Flint Glass Works in the Ancoats suburb of Manchester.
- Regional news programmes for the Isle of Man, North West England and south of Cumbria – North West Tonight (BBC North West) and Granada Reports (ITV Granada), both based in Salford Quays since Autumn 2011 and Spring 2013 respectively.
- Regional news programmes for the north of Cumbria – Look North (BBC North East and Cumbria) based in Newcastle and Lookaround (ITV Tyne Tees & Border) based in Gateshead.
- Regional news programmes for the West Craven area of Lancashire, historically in the West Riding of Yorkshire – Look North and ITV News Calendar both based in Leeds. Both are broadcast from the Skipton transmitter which is part of the Emley Moor transmitter group.
  - N.B. Digital TV comes from Winter Hill for the south of the region, and Caldbeck for Cumbria. Digital switchover took place in mid-2009 for Cumbria and late-2009 for the south of the region.

Radio

- BBC Local Radio services for the region include BBC Radios Manchester, Merseyside, Lancashire, Cumbria and Stoke (covering south of Cheshire).
- National radio comes from Holme Moss (for Merseyside, Greater Manchester, and Cheshire) and Sandale for Cumbria. There is a main MW transmitter for the region (and England), over the border in Kirklees, at Moorside Edge.
- Commercial radio stations include:
  - Heart North West (broadcast to Manchester, Lancashire and Merseyside via a regional service – formerly 105.4 Century FM and Real Radio – and to Barrow-in-Furness, Morecambe and Lancaster, formerly The Bay.
  - The Hits Radio network is based at Castlefield, Manchester; its stations include Hits Radio Manchester, Hits Radio Lancashire (Preston) and Hits Radio Liverpool, with the Castlefield studios also providing the majority of programmes for Hits Radio UK.
  - Capital Manchester and Lancashire (created from the former Galaxy Manchester and 2BR, the latter having earlier absorbed 106.5 Central Radio and The Bee), and Capital Liverpool (former Juice FM), with the Wirral and Cheshire served as part of Capital North West and North Wales.
  - Smooth North West (regional service) and Smooth Lake District (Kendal)
  - Greatest Hits Radio North West broadcasts to Merseyside, Oldham and Rochdale, Bolton and Bury, Stockport, Wigan and St. Helens, Blackpool and Warrington and Runcorn on FM, and to Liverpool, Manchester and central Lancashire via DAB and formerly AM. A localised version for Cumbria launched on DAB in 2021, then in April 2023, CFM was rebranded as Greatest Hits Radio Cumbria & South West Scotland while the DAB feed now carries Hits Radio. Some programmes for the Greatest Hits Radio network are broadcast from Castlefield or St John's Beacon, Liverpool.
  - Chester's Dee Radio (Chester) and sibling Cheshire's Silk 106.9 (Macclesfield)

The UK's Time signal comes from Anthorn Radio Station on the north-west Cumbrian coast, where there are three atomic clocks.

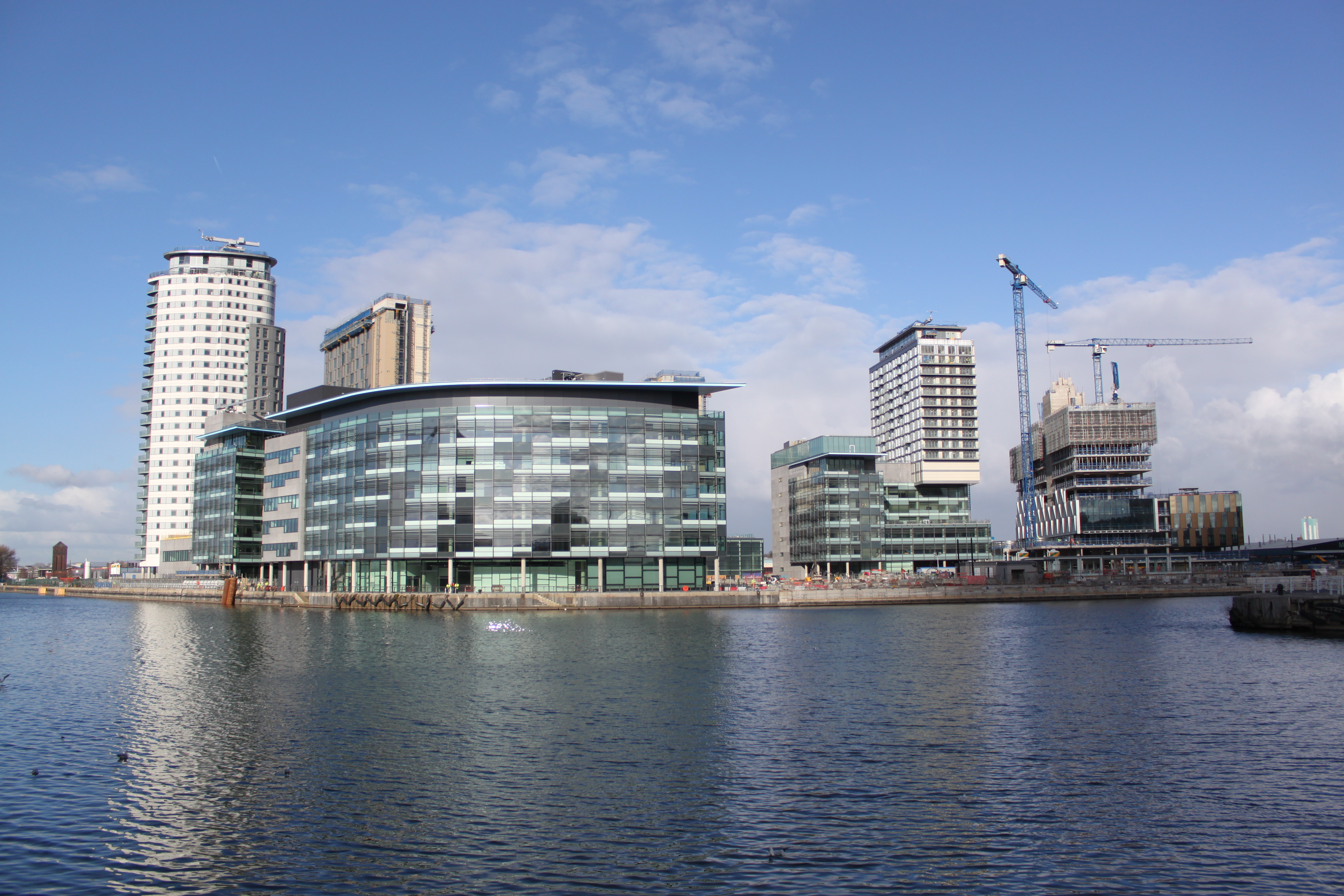
MediaCityUK being built at Salford Quays

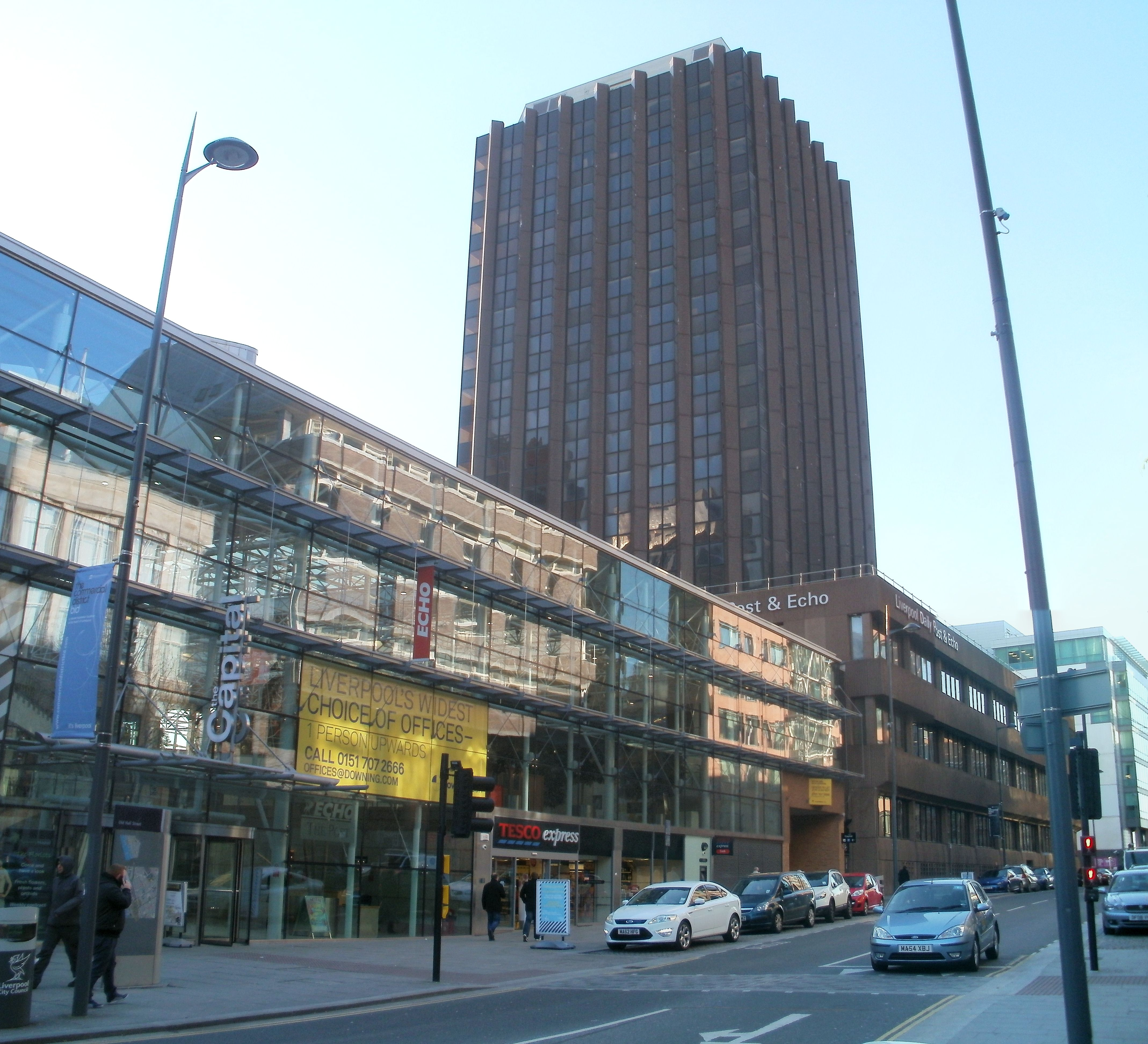
Liverpool Echo building

Newspapers

- Blackpool Gazette, Blackpool
- Bolton News, Bolton
- Bury Times, Bury
- Lancashire Post, Preston
- Lancashire Telegraph, Blackburn
- Liverpool Echo, Liverpool
- Manchester Evening News, Manchester
- News and Star, Carlisle
- The Mail, Barrow-in-Furness
- Southport Visiter, Southport
- The Reporter, St Helens
- The Star, St Helens
- Westmorland Gazette, Kendal
- Wigan Evening Post, Wigan

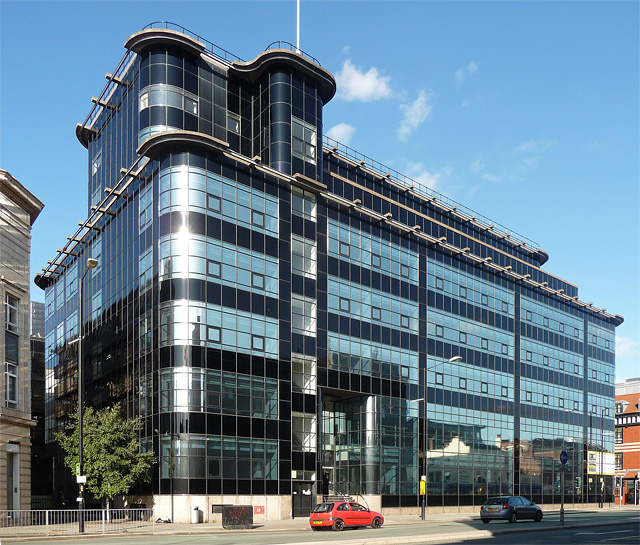
1939 Sir Owen Williams Daily Express Building, Manchester

Guardian Media Group have a printing site at Trafford Park Printers off the A5081 (M60 junction 9) between the Bridgewater Canal and the A576 roundabout which prints the Guardian (it is owned 50% with the Telegraph and 50% by Guardian Print Centre); it printed the Telegraph until 2008, and is known also as GPC Manchester. From 2008, the Telegraph has been printed at the Newsprinters huge site at Knowsley. Newsprinters have a site near Dairy Crest at Knowsley, and prints the Times, Telegraph and Sun titles, near the B5202.

Broughton Printers, owned by Northern & Shell, print the Express and Star at Fulwood on the B6241 south of the M55/M6 junction, on the same site as the Lancashire Evening Post.

Magazines

Prinovis in Liverpool (Speke) prints OK!, the Sun on Sunday magazine (Fabulous), and the Sunday Times magazine.

== Town and city twinnings ==
Twin towns and sister cities in North West England
UK settlement	Twin settlement
Ashton-under-Lyne	Chaumont, France
Blackburn	Altena, Germany; Péronne, France
Blackpool	Bottrop, Germany
Bolton	Le Mans, France; Paderborn, Germany
Burnley	Vitry Sur Seine, France
Bury	Angoulême, France; Datong, China; Tulle, France; Schorndorf, Germany; Woodbury, New Jersey, US
Carlisle	Flensburg, Germany; Słupsk, Poland
Carnforth	Sailly-sur-la-Lys, France
Chadderton	Geesthacht, Germany
Chester	Sens, France; Lörrach, Germany; Senigallia, Italy
Chorley	Székesfehérvár, Hungary
Dalton-in-Furness	Dalton, Pennsylvania, US
Denton	Montigny-le-Bretonneux, France
Droylsden	Villemomble, France
Dukinfield	Champagnole, France
Ellesmere Port	Reutlingen, Germany
Failsworth	Landsberg am Lech, Germany
Fleetwood	Fleetwood, Pennsylvania, US
Halton	Leiria, Portugal; Marzahn-Hellersdorf, Germany; Tongling, China; Ústí nad Labem, Czech Republic
Heywood	Peine, Germany
Kendal	Killarney, Ireland; Rinteln, Germany
Knowsley	Moers, Germany
Lancaster	Aalborg, Denmark; Rendsburg, Germany
Liverpool	Cologne, Germany; Rio de Janeiro, Brazil; Dublin, Ireland; Odesa, Ukraine; Shanghai, China
Longdendale	Ruppichteroth, Germany
Manchester	Amsterdam, Netherlands; Chemnitz, Germany; Córdoba, Spain; Faisalabad, Pakistan; Los Angeles, California, US; Puerto Cabezas, Nicaragua; Rehovot, Israel; Saint Petersburg, Russia; Wuhan, China
Mossley	Hem, France
Oldham	Kranj, Slovenia
Oswaldtwistle	Falkenberg, Sweden
Preston	Almelo, Netherlands; Kalisz, Poland; Nîmes, France; Recklinghausen, Germany
Rochdale	Bielefeld, Germany; Lviv, Ukraine; Sahiwal, Pakistan; Tourcoing, France
Salford	Clermont-Ferrand, France; Lunen, Germany; Narbonne, France; Saint-Ouen, France
Sedbergh	Zreĉe, Slovenia
Sefton	Gdańsk, Poland; Mons, Belgium
Stalybridge	Armentières, France
Stockport	Béziers, France; Heilbronn, Germany
St. Helens	Stuttgart, Germany; Chalon-sur-Saône, France
Tameside	Bengbu, China; Mutare, Zimbabwe
Ulverston	Albert, France
Warrington	Hilden, Germany; Lake County, Illinois, US; Náchod, Czech Republic
Whitehaven	Kozloduy, Bulgaria
Wigan	Angers, France
Workington	Selm, Germany; Val-de-Reuil, France
Wrea Green	St Bris le Vineux, France

== Sport ==
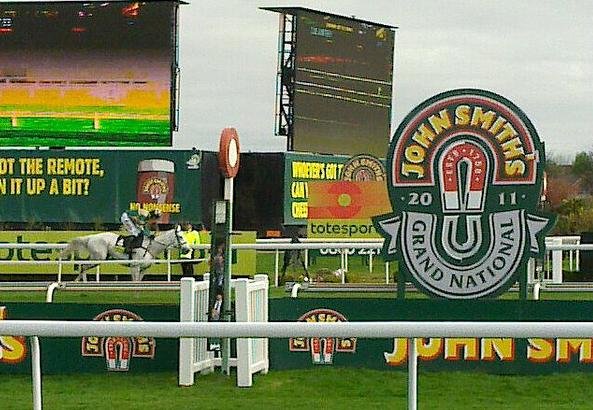
Grand National, Aintree Racecourse

The modern dart board was invented in 1896 by Lancashire carpenter Brian Gamlin from Bury, aged 44. Oulton Park, in central Cheshire, is the home of the British Touring Car Championship in June. The International Netball Federation is situated in Manchester, home to the National Squash Centre and the National Cycling Centre (Manchester Velodrome and British Cycling) at Sportcity. The first greyhound racing in the UK was in July 1926 in Manchester at the purpose-built oval Belle Vue Stadium. The National Football Museum is in Manchester.

=== Football ===
The following football clubs are based in the North West, and compete in the Premier League or Football League (the top four division of the English football league system) into the 2025-26 season. The National League is also included.

Team	Location	League 2025–26
Burnley	Burnley, Lancashire	Premier League
Everton	Liverpool, Merseyside	Premier League
Liverpool	Liverpool, Merseyside	Premier League
Manchester City	Manchester, Greater Manchester	Premier League
Manchester United	Manchester, Greater Manchester	Premier League
Blackburn Rovers	Blackburn, Lancashire	Championship
Preston North End	Preston, Lancashire	Championship
Blackpool	Blackpool, Lancashire	League One
Bolton Wanderers	Bolton, Greater Manchester	League One
Wigan Athletic	Wigan, Greater Manchester	League One
Stockport County	Stockport, Greater Manchester	League One
Accrington Stanley	Accrington, Lancashire	League Two
Barrow	Barrow-in-Furness, Cumbria	League Two
Crewe Alexandra	Crewe, Cheshire	League Two
Fleetwood Town	Fleetwood, Lancashire	League Two
Salford City	Salford, Greater Manchester	League Two
Tranmere Rovers	Birkenhead, Merseyside	League Two
Carlisle United	Carlisle, Cumbria	National League
Rochdale	Rochdale, Greater Manchester	National League

Teams in the North West have won 64 out of 124 English football League titles (just over 50%), more than any other region, with Manchester United and Liverpool having won more than any other teams.

=== Rugby League ===
The following rugby league clubs are based in the North West, and compete in the Super League or the Championships (the second division of the British rugby league system) as of 2026.

==== Super League teams ====
- Leigh Leopards (Leigh, Greater Manchester)
- St. Helens (St Helens, Mersyside)
- Warrington Wolves (Warrington, Cheshire)
- Wigan Warriors (Wigan, Greater Manchester)

==== Championship teams ====
- Barrow Raiders (Barrow-in-Furness, Cumbria)
- Oldham Roughyeds (Oldham, Greater Manchester)
- Rochdale Hornets (Rochdale, Greater Manchester)
- Salford RLFC (Salford, Greater Manchester)
- Swinton Lions (Swinton, Greater Manchester)
- Whitehaven (Whitehaven, Cumbria)
- Widnes Vikings (Widnes, Cheshire)
- Workington Town (Workington, Cumbria)

=== Horse racing ===
Aintree Racecourse in Liverpool is home of the Grand National.

=== Swimming ===
Aquatics GB has one of its three intensive training centres at the Grand Central Pools in Stockport.

=== Golf ===
Royal Birkdale Golf Club is at Southport and there is the Royal Lytham & St Annes Golf Club. Royal Liverpool Golf Club is at Hoylake.

== See also ==
- Cumbric language
- Envirolink Northwest
- List of schools in the North West of England
- Northwest Development Agency
- Outline of England
