= 2002 Birthday Honours =

British government recognitions

Queen's Birthday Honours are announced on or around the date of the Queen's Official Birthday in Australia, Canada, New Zealand, and the United Kingdom. The dates vary, both from year to year and from country to country. All are published in supplements to the London Gazette and many are formally conferred by the monarch (or her representative) some time after the date of the announcement, particularly for those service people on active duty.

This page lists awards announced in the 2002 Queen's Birthday honours lists for the United Kingdom and New Zealand.

== United Kingdom ==
=== Knights Bachelor ===
- Professor Peter Robert Frank Bell. Professor of Surgery, Leicester. For services to Surgery. (Leicester, Leicestershire)
- Peter Thomas Blake, CBE. Artist. For services to Art. (London, W4)
- Brian Anthony Briscoe. Chief executive, Local Government Association. For services to Local Government. (Maidstone, Kent)
- Professor Partha Sarathi Dasgupta. Frank Ramsay Professor of Economics, University of Cambridge. For services to Economics. (Cambridge, Cambridgeshire)
- Robert Dowling. Headteacher, George Dixon Secondary School and Sixth Form College and also of Selly Oak Special School. For services to Special Needs Education. (Birmingham, West Midlands)
- Roy Alan Gardner. Chief executive, Centrica plc. For services to the Gas and Electricity Industries. (St Albans, Hertfordshire)
- Max Macdonald Hastings. Lately Editor, Evening Standard and The Daily Telegraph. For services to Journalism. (Hungerford, Berkshire)
- Michael Philip Jagger. Singer and Songwriter. For services to popular music.
- Professor Ian Kershaw. Professor of Modern History, University of Sheffield. For services to History. (Manchester, Greater Manchester)
- Professor Peter Julius Lachmann. For services to Medical Science. (Cambridge, Cambridgeshire)
- Professor John Stuart Lilleyman. Head, Paediatric Haematology and Oncology, Barts and The London School of Medicine. For services to Pathology. (Keysoe, Bedfordshire)
- Professor Colin Renshaw Lucas. Vice-chancellor, University of Oxford. For services to Higher Education. (Oxford, Oxfordshire)
- Philip John Courtney Mawer. Lately secretary General, Archbishops' Council and General Synod of the Church of England. For services to the Church of England. (Welwyn, Hertfordshire)
- Thomas Fulton Wilson McKillop. Chief executive, AstraZeneca. For services to the Pharmaceutical Industry. (London, SW1W)
- Graham Meldrum, CBE, QFSM. Her Majesty's Chief Inspector of Fire Services, Department for Transport, Local Government and the Regions. (Warwick, Warwickshire)
- Jonathan Wolfe Miller, CBE. Opera director. For services to music and the arts. (London, W4)
- Gulam Kaderbhoy Noon, MBE. For services to Industry. (London, SW1)
- Trevor Robert Nunn, CBE. Director. For services to the Theatre. (London, W6)
- Peter Rigby. For services to Information Technology and to Business in the West Midlands. (Solihull, West Midlands)
- Robert William Robson, CBE. For services to Association Football. (Newcastle upon Tyne, Tyne and Wear)
- David Calvert-Smith, QC. Director of Public Prosecutions. (London)
- Brian John Stewart, CBE. Chairman, Scottish and Newcastle plc. For services to Industry. (Edinburgh)
- Anthony John Patrick Vineall. Lately chairman, School Teachers' Review Body. For services to Education. (Guildford, Surrey)
- Alfred Cecil Walker, JP. For political and public service. (Newtownabbey, Antrim)
- Keith Roderick Whitson. Group chief executive, HSBC Holdings plc. For services to Banking. (London, SW7)
- David Wilmot, QPM, DL. Chief Constable, Greater Manchester Police. For services to the Police. (Cheshire)
- Nicholas Raymond Winterton, MP. Member of Parliament for Macclesfield. For services to Parliament. (Congleton, Cheshire)
- Ronald Wayne De Witt. Chief executive, North West London Strategic Health Authority. For services to the NHS. (London, SW5)
- Anthony Ian Young. Lately Senior Deputy General secretary, Communication Workers' Union; president, TUC; Governor, BBC. For services to Employment Relations. (Middlesex)

=== Order of the Companions of Honour (CH) ===
- Sir Michael Eliot Howard, CBE, MC. Emeritus Professor of Modern History, University of Oxford. For services to Military Studies. (Hungerford, Berkshire)
- Harold Pinter, CBE. Playwright. For services to Literature. (London, W10)

=== Order of the Bath ===
==== Knight Grand Cross of the Order of the Bath (GCB) ====
Military Division

Royal Navy

- Admiral Sir Nigel Richard Essenhigh, K.C.B., A.D.C.

Civil Division

- Sir (Gerald) Hayden Phillips, KCB. Permanent secretary, Lord Chancellor's Department and Clerk of the Crown in Chancery. (London)

==== Knight Commander (KCB) ====
- Lieutenant General Alistair Stuart Hastings Irwin, C.B.E., late The Black Watch.
- Jon Deacon Shortridge. Permanent secretary, National Assembly for Wales. (Cardiff)
- Robin Urquhart Young. Permanent secretary, Department of Trade and Industry. (London, SW1V)

==== Companion (CB) ====
Military Division

Royal Navy

- Vice Admiral Peter Arthur Dunt.
- Major General Anthony Arthur Milton, O.B.E.

Army

- Lieutenant General Robert Clark Menzies, O.B.E., Q.H.S., late Royal Army Medical Corps.
- Major General Robin Vincent Searby, late 9th/12th Royal Lancers.

Royal Air Force

- Air Marshal Clifford Rodney Spink, C.B.E., Royal Air Force.
- Air Vice-Marshal Nigel John Sudborough, O.B.E., Royal Air Force.

Civil Division

- Professor Mansel Aylward. Chief Medical Adviser and Medical director, Department for Work and Pensions. (Merthyr Tydfil, Mid Glamorgan)
- Ian Brooke. Senior Civil Servant, Ministry of Defence. (London)
- Mrs Hilary Kay Douglas. Managing director, Corporate Services and Development, HM Treasury. (Walton on Thames, Surrey)
- Peter Garland. Director of Health and Social Care, North, Department of Health. (Ilkley, West Yorkshire)
- Douglas Alexander Osler. HM Senior chief inspector of Education, Scottish Executive. (Haddington, East Lothian)
- Alastair Harkness Papps. Lately Associate director, Centre for Management and Policy Studies, Cabinet Office and Operational director, HM Prison Service. (Alnwick, Northumberland)
- Ms Alice Elizabeth Perkins (Mrs Straw). Head, Civil Service Corporate Management and Reform, Cabinet Office.
- David Francis William Pickup. Solicitor, HM Board of Customs and Excise. (London, SE1)
- Godfrey Robson. Director of Policy, Health Department, Scottish Executive. (Edinburgh)
- David James Watkins. For Public Service. (Belfast)

=== Order of St Michael and St George ===
==== Knight Grand Cross (GCMG) ====
- Sir David John Wright, K.C.M.G., L.V.O., Group Chief Executive, British Trade International.

==== Knight Commander (KCMG) ====
- Colin Richard Budd, C.M.G., H.M. Ambassador, The Hague.
- Brian Lee Crowe, C.M.G., lately Director-General of the External Services of the Council Secretariat of the European Union.
- Jeremy Frederick Lever, Q.C. For services to European Community and competition law.
- Francis Neville Richards, C.M.G., C.V.O., Director, GCHQ.
- Professor Edward Adam Roberts. For services to the study and practice of international relations.

==== Companion (CMG) ====
- Desmond John Bowen. For services to NATO. (London)
- Martin Eugene Donnelly. Deputy head, European Secretariat, Cabinet Office. (London)
- William Varley Fell, Counsellor, Foreign and Commonwealth Office.
- Professor Christopher John Greenwood, Q.C.. For services to Public International Law.
- Denise Mary, Mrs. Holt, lately Director Personnel, Foreign and Commonwealth Office.
- Professor Tecwyn Jones, O.B.E. For services to Biotech-International.
- Colonel John Mark Kane, O.B.E., late The Royal Logistic Corps.
- Gerald John Liston, Head Resources, British Council Headquarters.
- Nicolas Wolfers Lorne MacLean of Pennycross. For services to UK-Japanese and Asian relations.
- Peter Michael Mathews. Founder, Black Country Metals Ltd. For services to Export. (Kinver, West Midlands)
- Sarah Frances, Mrs Morphet, lately Research Counsellor, Foreign and Commonwealth Office.
- John Valentine Silcock, Counsellor, H.M. Embassy, Washington.
- Anthony Francis Smith, lately British High Commissioner, Kingston.
- Lloyd Barnaby Smith, H.M. Ambassador, Bangkok.
- William Llewelyn Stow. Deputy permanent Representative to the EU, Department of Trade and Industry. (Kent)
- Richard Timmis Turner, OBE. Group Marketing director, Rolls-Royce plc. For services to Trade and Investment. (London, W11)
- Nicholas Alan Thorne, Counsellor, UKMis, New York.

=== Royal Victorian Order ===
==== Knight Commander (KCVO) ====
- Stephen Mark Jeffrey Lamport, CVO. Private secretary and Treasurer to The Prince of Wales.
- Col John Bradford Timmins, OBE, TD, JP. Lord Lieutenant of Greater Manchester.

==== Commander (CVO) ====
- Capt Martin John Appleton. Royal Navy, formerly director-General, King George's Fund for Sailors.
- Capt Michael Ernest Barrow, DSO. Royal Navy, Gentleman Usher to The Queen.
- Michael Edward Kilby Hewlett, LVO. Formerly managing director, Royal Collection Enterprises.
- Air Vice-Marshal Barry Hamilton Newton, CB, OBE. Gentleman Usher to The Queen.

==== Lieutenant (LVO) ====
- Paul Martin Almond, MVO. Assistant to the Crown Equerry.
- James William Charles Moir. BBC Royal Liaison.
- Mrs Donna Claire Mowbray, MVO. Accountant, Property Services.
- Lt Col Nigel John Newman. Chapter Clerk, St. George's Chapel.
- Miss Viola Bridget Pemberton-Pigott, MVO. Senior Paintings Conservator, Royal Collection.
- Geoffrey Brian Skelsey. Principal assistant Registrar, University of Cambridge.
- Miss Gillian Irene Wickham, MVO. Payroll Supervisor, Royal Household.

==== Member (MVO) ====
- Dr John David Keith Burton, CBE. Formerly Coroner to the Royal Household.
- Sydney William Creamer. R. A. Creamer and Son. For services to the Royal Household.
- John Martin Curr. Assistant chief Accountant, Royal Household.
- Lt Cdr William Nicholas Entwisle. Royal Navy; formerly Equerry to The Prince of Wales.
- Mrs Amanda Jane Foster. Press Officer, The Prince of Wales's Household.
- Alec Jacobs. Surveyor of Works, Crown Estate, Windsor.
- Richard George Lewis. Gentleman of The Chapel Royal, St. James's Palace.
- John Douglas Mitchell, OBE. For services to The Prince's Trust.
- Miss Elizabeth Jane Potter (Mrs Anslow). Formerly Farrer & Co. For services to the Royal Household.
- Grahame Alexander Storey. Accountant, Royal Studs.
- Graham Donald Trew. Gentleman of The Chapel Royal, St. James's Palace.
- Lt Col Richard Alan Waterer, OBE. Commandant, Royal Marines School of Music and Principal director of Music, Royal Marines Band Service.
- Capt John Roger Wilson. Public Enterprises Administrator, Balmoral Estate.

=== Royal Victorian Medal (RVM) ===
==== Royal Victorian Medal (Gold) ====
- David Hugh Farrow, RVM, formerly tractor driver, Sandringham Estate.

==== Bar to the Royal Victorian Medal (Silver) ====
- John Nelson Hart, RVM, Beat Keeper, Sandringham Estate.
- Richard Clive Lines, RVM, painter and decorator, Sandringham Estate.
- Adrian Osborne, RVM, foreman electrician, Sandringham Estate.

==== Royal Victorian Medal (Silver) ====
- Roy Keith Barnett. Yeoman Bed Goer, The Queen's Body Guard of the Yeomen of the Guard.
- Miss Ruby Sandra Capstick. Head Housemaid, Windsor Castle.
- Julian Charles George Clare. Assistant Drawings Restorer, Royal Library.
- Adrian John Denman. Head Gardener, Windsor Castle.
- Mrs Megan Gent. Paper Conservator, Royal Archives.
- Michael Robert Hancock. Painter and Decorator, Crown Estate, Windsor.
- Constable Robin Arthur Jary. Royalty Protection Department, Metropolitan Police.
- Huw Cefin Jones. Junior Sous Chef, Royal Kitchens.
- Joseph Geoffrey Last, BEM. Head Chauffeur, Royal Mews.
- Peter James Lea. Formerly Office Keeper, Central Chancery of the Orders of Knighthood.
- David John Oates. Coachman, Royal Mews.
- John William Stanyard. Divisional Sergeant Major, The Queen's Body Guard of the Yeomen of the Guard.
- Neville William Taylor. Divisional Sergeant Major, The Queen's Body Guard of the Yeomen of the Guard.
- David William Thorne. Ranger, Country Park, Sandringham Estate.
- David Edgar Waters. Formerly Woodman, Crown Estate, Windsor.
- Thomas William Wells. Estate Foreman, Lancashire Survey, Duchy of Lancaster.
- David Frank Westwood. Exhibitions and Maintenance Conservator, Royal Library.
- Raymond Wheaton. Page of the Chambers, Master of the Household's Department.

=== Order of the British Empire ===
==== Knight Grand Cross (GBE) ====
- Sir Ronald Flanagan, OBE. Lately chief Constable, Police Service of Northern Ireland. For services to Northern Ireland. (London, SW1H)

==== Dame Commander (DBE) ====
- Mrs Ruth Lynn Deech. Lately chairman. For services to the Human Fertilisation and Embryology Authority. (Oxford, Oxfordshire)
- Miss Judith Mayhew. Chairman, Policy and Resources Committee, Corporation of London. For services to the City of London. (London, EC4V)
- Miss Janet Ritterman. Director, Royal College of Music. For services to Music.

==== Knight Commander (KBE) ====
- Prince Sadruddin Aga Khan. For services to humanitarian causes and the arts.
- Nicholas Walker Browne, C.M.G., lately H.M.Ambassador, Tehran.

==== Commander (CBE) ====
Military Division

- Brigadier Roderick James Croucher. Late Corps of Royal Electrical and Mechanical Engineers.
- Brigadier Christopher Gibbs Holtom. Late Intelligence Corps.
- Colonel Christopher John Murray. Late The Royal Logistic Corps.
- Brigadier Malcolm David Wood, MBE. Late The Royal Logistic Corps.

Civil Division

- Alexander Dalgety Adamson. Divisional Manager, Pupil Standards Division, Department for Education and Skills. (London, SW14)
- Professor William Richard Allen. Director, Equine Fertility Unit, University of Cambridge. For services to Horseracing and Equine Science. (Newmarket, Suffolk)
- Brian Appleton. Vice Chairman, London Transport. For services to Safety Management. (Bath, Somerset)
- Professor John Stuart Archer. Principal and Vice Chancellor, Heriot-Watt University. For services to Higher Education. (Hermiston Currie, Midlothian)
- John Ashford. Director, The Place Theatre. For services to Dance. (London, WC1H)
- Miss Susan Atkinson. Regional Director, Public Health and Medical Director, London, Department of Health.
- Professor Raymond Baker, FRS. Lately Chief Executive, Biotechnology and Biological Sciences Research Council. For services to Science. (Dursley, Gloucestershire)
- Ms Urmila Banerjee. Member, Cabinet Office Management Board. For services to Modernisation of the Civil Service. (London, SW3)
- Ralph Mitchell Bernard. Chairman, GWR Group plc. For services to Radio Broadcasting. (Marlborough, Wiltshire)
- Frank Blin. Head, UK Regions and Industries, PriceWaterhouseCoopers. For services to the Financial Sector. (Newton Mearns, Glasgow)
- Peter Boeuf. Lately Chief Crown Prosecutor, Crown Prosecution Service. (Devon)
- Professor William Arthur Brown. Master of Darwin College, University of Cambridge. For services to Employment Relations. (Cambridge, Cambridgeshire)
- John Anthony Charles Buckels. Consultant Hepatobiliary and Transplant Surgeon, Queen Elizabeth and Children's Hospitals, Birmingham. For services to Transplant Surgery. (Birmingham, West Midlands)
- Professor Roger John Bull. Vice-chancellor and Chief Executive, University of Plymouth. For services to Higher Education. (Tavistock, Devon)
- Alan Grant Campbell. Chief Executive, Aberdeenshire Council. For services to Local Government. (Aberdeen)
- Brian Cass. Managing Director, Huntingdon Life Sciences Group plc. For services to Medical Research. (Cambridgeshire)
- Jonathan Philip Charkham. For services to Business. (London, SW7)
- Ian David Church. Editor, Official Report, House of Commons. (East Grinstead, West Sussex)
- Mrs Pauline Ann Clare, QPM, DL. Chief Constable, Lancashire Constabulary. For services to the Police. (Lancashire)
- Richard Temple Cox. Chairman, Castle Vale Housing Action Trust. For services to the Regeneration of Birmingham.
- Robert William Kenneth Crawford. Director-General, Imperial War Museum. For services to Museums. (Sevenoaks, Kent)
- Thomas Phillip Noel Crowley, DL. Presiding Officer, Welsh Local Government Association. For services to Local Government. (Port Talbot, Neath Port Talbot)
- David Kenneth Cunningham. Headteacher, Hillhead High School, Glasgow. For services to Education. (Newton Mearns, Renfrewshire)
- Robert Dickins. Chairman, Instant Karma Records. For services to the music industry. (London, SW1W)
- Professor Ann Patricia Dowling (Mrs Hynes). Professor of Mechanical Engineering, University of Cambridge. For services to Mechanical Engineering.
- Ian James Dudson, DL. Chief Executive Officer, Dudson's Ltd. For services to the Ceramics Industry. (Stoke-on-Trent, Staffordshire)
- John Harold Ebdon. Deputy Chief Executive, Valuation Office Agency, HM Board of Inland Revenue. (Hemel Hempstead, Hertfordshire)
- Thomas Edward Dacombe Eddy. Grade 5, Department for Environment, Food and Rural Affairs. (Esher, Surrey)
- Anthony John Edge. Lately Director of Field Operations for Wales, Midlands and the South, Department for Work and Pensions. (Upminster, Essex)
- Iain Scott Elrick. Lately Chief Executive, Defence Bills Agency, Ministry of Defence. (Ledbury, Herefordshire)
- Mrs Jean Elizabeth Ensing. Lately President, British Association of Early Childhood Education. For services to Early Years Education. (Bognor Regis, West Sussex)
- Professor Hubert Roy Evans. Vice Chancellor, University of Wales, Bangor. For services to Higher Education. (Anglesey, Gwynedd)
- John Anthony Leonard Faint. International Director, Department for International Development. (London, SW19)
- Keith John Faulkner. Managing Director, Working Links. For services to Industry and to Unemployed People. (Maidenhead, Berkshire)
- Sebastian Charles Faulks. Writer. For services to Literature. (London, SW10)
- David John Fletcher. Chief Executive, British Waterways. For services to Inland Waterways. (Little Gaddesden, Hertfordshire)
- Ms Shelia Mary Forbes. For services to Women in the Workforce. (London, W11)
- John Richard Forrest. For services to the Radio and Communications Industry. (London, SW10)
- Kenneth Peat Forrest. Lately Director, International Oil and Gas Business Directorate, Department of Trade and Industry. (Bridge of Weir, Renfrewshire)
- Mrs Joanna Katharine Foster. For services to the World of Work and to Equal Opportunities. (Oxford, Oxfordshire)
- Samuel Foster, MLA. For political and public service. (Enniskillen, Fermanagh)
- Mrs Elizabeth Irene France. Information commissioner. For services to Data Protection. (Lymm, Cheshire)
- Samuel Richard Gallop, OBE. For services to People with Disabilities. (London, SE21)
- Donald James Gelling. Lately Chief Minister. For services to the Isle of Man. (Santon, Isle of Man)
- Mrs Elizabeth Jon Grimsey, LVO. Director, Judicial Group, Lord Chancellor's Department. (Walton on Thames, Surrey)
- Miss Zaha Hadid. Architect. For services to Architecture. (London, EC1R)
- David Ross Harper. Chief Scientist, Public Health and Clinical Quality Directorate, Department of Health. (London, SE3)
- Jonathan David Harris, OBE. Lately President, Royal Institution of Chartered Surveyors. For services to the Surveying Profession. (London, NW3)
- Professor Michael Patrick Hassell, FRS. Principal, Faculty of Life Sciences, Imperial College London. For services to Population Ecology. (Ascot, Berkshire)
- William Edward Hesketh. For services to Public Transport. (Dunadry, Antrim)
- Richard Michael Hickman. Lately Chief Reporter, Scottish Executive. (Edinburgh)
- Richard Sidney Hickox. Conductor. For services to music. (London, N1)
- Professor Marian Elizabeth Hobson (Mrs Jeanneret). Professor of French, Queen Mary College, University of London. For services to French Language and Literature.
- Graham John Hooker. Head of Detection, HM Board of Customs and Excise. (Bexhill-on-Sea, East Sussex)
- Ms Rebecca Howard. For services to Nursing and Health Care Management. (New Brighton, Merseyside)
- Gordon Charles Keymer. Leader, Tandridge District Council. For services to Local Government. (Oxted, Surrey)
- Professor Ann-Louise Kinmonth. Professor of General Practice, University of Cambridge. For services to Primary Care Research and Development. (Cambridge, Cambridgeshire)
- Ms Francoise Mathilde Leake. Headteacher, Westborough High School, Dewsbury, West Yorkshire. For services to Education. (Dewsbury, West Yorkshire)
- Professor Arthur Maurice Lucas. Principal, King's College, London. For services to Higher Education. (London, SW1A)
- William Macquarie Lyne, MBE. Director, Wigmore Hall. For services to Music.
- Richard Auld Macdonald. Director General, National Farmers' Union. For services to Agriculture. (South Morton, Oxfordshire)
- Ms Susan Katriona MacGregor, OBE. For services to Radio Broadcasting. (London, NW1)
- William Kenneth MacIver. For services to the Aerospace Industry. (Shipston-on -Stour, Warwickshire)
- Mrs Mavis Maclean. For services to Research in the Justice System. (London, NW3)
- Professor Peter James Marshall. Historian. For services to History. (Ware, Hertfordshire)
- Christopher Masters. Lately Chairman, Aggreko plc. For services to Industry. (Edinburgh)
- Professor John Vincent McCanny. For services to Engineering and Higher Education. (Newtownards, Down)
- William Arthur McKee, JP. Lately Director General, British Property Federation. For services to the Property Industry. (Tadworth, Surrey)
- Professor Cecil Hugh McMurray. For Public Service. (Helen's Bay, Down)
- Charles Gordon Brown Nicholson, QC. Sheriff Principal, Lothian and Borders. For services to the Administration of Justice in Scotland. (Edinburgh)
- Torquil Patrick Alexander Norman. Founder, Norman Trust and Roundhouse. For services to Disadvantaged Young People. (London, NW1)
- Thomas O'Neill. Senior Vice President, Thales Defence UK. For services to the Defence Industry. (Whitecraigs, Glasgow)
- Professor (Thomas) Martin Partington. For services to the Administration of Justice. (Bristol)
- Ian Harry Peattie. Assistant Paymaster General, National Investment and Loans Office. (Huntingdon, Cambridgeshire)
- Professor William Brian Peeling. For services to Urology. (Newport, Gwent)
- Tom Phillips. Painter, Writer and Composer. For services to the Arts. (London, SE15)
- Ian Plenderleith. Lately Executive Director. For services to the Bank of England. (Petworth, West Sussex)
- Professor Christopher John Pollock. Director, Institute of Grassland and Environmental Research. For services to the Environment. (Ceredigion)
- Clifford James Prior. Chief Executive, National Schizophrenia Fellowship. For services to Health Care. (London, N15)
- Paul Maximilian Rayner. Lately Principal Establishment and Finance Officer, Serious Fraud Office. (Tonbridge, Kent)
- The Rt Hon Edward Rowlands. For services to the History of Parliament Trust. (Merthyr Tydfil, Mid Glamorgan)
- Miss Gillian Mary Ryder Samuels. Senior Director, Science Policy and Scientific Affairs Europe. For services to the Bioscience and Pharmaceutical Industries.
- Professor Peter John Schuddeboom. For services to Enterprise, Trade and Investment. (Harwell, Oxfordshire)
- Professor Robert Wayne Shaw. Lately President, Royal College of Obstetricians and Gynaecologists. For services to Medicine. (Cambridge, Cambridgeshire)
- Ms Valerie Shawcross. Lately Leader, London Borough of Croydon. For services to Local Government. (London, SE19)
- Christopher John Shepley. Chief Planning Inspector and Chief Executive, Planning Inspectorate, Department for Transport, Local Government and the Regions. (Widcombe, Bath)
- Anthony Charles Sleeman. Director, Southern England, HM Board of Inland Revenue. (Woking, Surrey)
- John Despenser Spencely. Architect. For services to Architecture. (Edinburgh)
- Malcolm Frederick Stamp. Chief Executive, Norfolk and Norwich University Hospital NHS Trust. For services to Health Care. (Norwich, Norfolk)
- Frederick Nigel Summers. Chief Executive, Sandwell Metropolitan Borough Council. For services to Regeneration and to Partnership Working. (Birmingham, West Midlands)
- Ian Pollock Sword, FRSE., Chairman, Inveresk Research. For services to Research, Education and Enterprise. (Edinburgh)
- Professor June Thoburn. Professor of Social Work, University of East Anglia. For services to Social Work. (Norwich, Norfolk)
- Professor Alison Tierney. Head of Department, Nursing Studies, University of Edinburgh. For services to Nursing Research and Education. (Edinburgh)
- Brian James Turner. Chef and Restaurateur. For services to Tourism and to Training in the Catering Industry. (Stanmore, Middlesex)
- Ms Sandra Diane Unerman. Director, Planning, Local Government, Housing and Employment Directorate, Department for Transport, Local Government and the Regions. (London, N12)
- Sushil Baldev Wadhwani. For services to the Monetary Policy Committee of the Bank of England. (Kingston upon Thames, Surrey)
- Miss Diana Marion Walford. Director, Public Health Laboratory Service. For services to Public Health.
- James Lamont Walker. President, National Farmers' Union of Scotland. For services to Agriculture. (Sanquhar, Dumfries)
- Mrs Perween Warsi, MBE. Managing Director, S and A Foods Ltd. For services to Business. (Derby, Derbyshire)
- The Reverend Christian Oliver Weaver, MBE, JP. Head, Pilgrim Church UK. For services to Racial Equality. (Nottingham, Nottinghamshire)
- Mrs Christine Anne Whatford. Lately Chief Education Officer, Hammersmith and Fulham, London. For services to Education. (London, SE23)
- Philip Michael White. Chief Executive, National Express. For services to Public Transport. (Harrogate, North Yorkshire)
- David Houston Will. Vice-President, Executive Committee of FIFA. For services to Association Football. (Brechin, Angus)
- Kenneth Robert Williams, QPM. Chief Constable, Norfolk Constabulary. For services to the Police. (Norfolk)
- Mrs Catherine Fiona Woolf. Senior Partner, CMS Cameron McKenna. For services to the UK Knowledge Economy and Invisible Earnings. (Esher, Surrey)

Diplomatic Service and Overseas

- Professor Michael Balls. For services to humane animal research.
- Iain Leonard Dale, OBE. For services to International trade.
- Evan Mervyn Davies. For services to British financial interests and the community, Hong Kong.
- Roger Gordon Fry, OBE. For services to the Council of British Independent Schools in the European Community.
- Henry Thomas Putnam, OBE. For services to the British Institute of Florence.

==== Officer (OBE) ====
- The Most Reverend Father Oluwole Aremu Abiola. For services to Inter-Faith Relations.
- Professor Josephine Dawn Ades, Professor of Art History and Theory, University of Essex. For services to Art History. (London, N6)
- Robert Alexander. District Manager, Jobcentre Plus, Department for Work and Pensions. (Carnoustie, Angus)
- Professor Anne Harper Anderson. Professor of Psychology, University of Glasgow. For services to Social Science. (Glasgow)
- The Very Reverend John Robert Arnold, Dean of Durham. For services to the European Ecumenical Movement. (Durham)
- John Michael Stewart Arnott. Chairman, Scottish Wildlife Trust. For services to Conservation. (Edinburgh)
- Philip Barry Ashmore. Director, Nissan Motor Manufacturing Ltd. For services to the New Deal in Northumberland. (Morpeth, Northumberland)
- The Reverend Canon Richard William Bryant Atkinson. For services to Unemployed People in Rotherham, South Yorkshire. (Leicester, Leicestershire)
- Ms Mary Josephine Auckland. Director of Library and Learning Resources, London Institute. For services to Librarianship. (Hatfield Peveral, Essex)
- Waqar Azmi, Chief Executive, Worcestershire Racial Equality Council and Race Equality West Midlands. For services to Community Life in the West Midlands. (Barnt Green, Worcestershire)
- Mrs Susan Mary Bailey. Clinical Manager, Gardner Unit, Salford. For services to Youth Justice.
- Nicholas John Baker. Head, National Teams, HM Board of Customs and Excise. (Hertfordshire)
- Jonathan Eric Bardon. For services to Community Life. (Belfast)
- Nicolas John Barker. For services to Charity and Books. (London, W11)
- Robert John Baty. Chief Executive, South West Water Ltd. For services to the Water Industry. (Ottery St Mary, Devon)
- Keith Malcolm Baughan. Vice President, Research, Nokia. For services to Research into Mobile Communications. (Alton, Hampshire)
- Professor Steven Peter Beaumont. Director, Institute for System Level Integration. For services to Electronics and Nanotechnology. (Glasgow)
- Ms Jacqueline Ann Beere, Advanced Skills Teacher, Campion School, Bugbrooke, Northamptonshire. For services to Education. (Towcester, Northamptonshire)
- Mrs Avril Elizabeth Beynon. Human Resources Director, Driver and Vehicle Licensing Agency, Department for Transport, Local Government and the Regions. (Ammanford, Dyfed)
- Miss Irene Veronica Bird. Governor, HM Prison/Young Offender Institution, New Hall, HM Prison Service, Home Office. (Harrogate, North Yorkshire)
- Alexander Paul Blakeley. Chief Executive, Talisman Energy UK Ltd. For services to the Oil and Gas Industry. (Montrose, Angus)
- Tom Blumenau. For services to the field of human rights
- John Emanuel Bodie. For charitable services, especially to Health and Education. (London, W1K)
- Edwin Roy Pratt Boorman, DL. For services to the Royal British Legion in Kent. (Wateringbury, Kent)
- James Brodie. Chair, Victim Support Scotland. For services to the Victims of Crime. (Ayr, Ayrshire and Arran)
- Peter Brokenshire. Lately Chairman, Redbridge and Waltham Forest Health Authority. For services to Health Care. (Loughton, Essex)
- Timothy Frederick Brookman. Marketing Executive, AgustaWestland. For services to the Defence Industry. (Shepton Beauchamp, Somerset)
- James Brown. Director of Integration, Scottish Water. For services to the Water Industry. (Dunblane, Perth and Kinross)
- Colonel Mark Mackenzie Carnegie-Brown. Lately Swordbearer. For services to the Corporation of London. (Cornwall)
- Samuel Jeffrey Brown. Rector, Moffat Academy. For services to Education. (Moffat, Dumfries)
- Nigel Bryson. Director, Health and Environment, GMB Union. For services to Occupational Health and Safety. (Basingstoke, Hampshire)
- Ms Pamela Elizabeth Buckley. Specialty Manager, Urology and Renal Services, Newcastle upon Tyne NHS Trust. For services to Health Care. (Newcastle upon Tyne, Tyne and Wear)
- Jonathan Burnett. Principal, Truro College, Cornwall. For services to Further Education. (Penzance, Cornwall)
- William John Burnett. Audit Manager, National Audit Office. (Letchworth, Hertfordshire)
- Simon James Butler. Tactical Systems Manager, BAE Systems. For services to the Defence Industry. (North Harrow, Middlesex)
- Ms Dinah Caine. Chief Executive, Skillset. For services to the Media Industry. (London, NW5)
- Miss Catherine Joan Caldwell. Director of Midwifery and Deputy director, Nursing Trust, Royal Devon and Exeter Health Care NHS Trust. For services to Modern Retention Initiatives. (Exeter, Devon)
- Mrs Jacqueline Sybil Chambers. Director of Public Health, Birmingham. For services to Public Health Medicine.
- Ms Caroline Charles, Designer. For services to the Fashion Industry. (London, SW1)
- Mrs Beth Chatto, Chairman and Managing Director, Beth Chatto Gardens. For services to Horticulture. (Colchester, Essex)
- Michael Paul Clancy. Director, Parliamentary Liaison, Law Society of Scotland. For services to the Legal Profession. (Edinburgh)
- Mrs Fiona Clarke. Joint Co-ordinator, Kids VIP. For services to Prisoners' Children. (Winchester, Hampshire)
- David John Cleland. For Public Service. (Belfast)
- David Clifford, DL. Managing Director, Port of Tyne Authority. For services to Business in North East England. (Sunderland, Tyne and Wear)
- Charles Cochrane. For services to the Council of Civil Service Unions. (Harlow, Essex)
- Professor David Noel Murray Coggon. For services to the Industrial Injuries Advisory Council. (Awbridge, Hampshire)
- Ms Christine Collier. Chief Executive, Cumbria Tourist Board. For services to Tourism.
- Maurice Collins. For services to Disabled People. (London, N2)
- Ms Christina Conroy. Principal, Richmond Adult and Community College, Surrey. For services to Further Education. (East Molesey, Surrey)
- Mrs Fionnuala Cook, JP. For services to Health and Social Services. (Banbridge, Down)
- John Cousil. Lately Headteacher, Dale Grove Special School and head, Tameside EBD Service. For services to Special Needs Education. (Glossop, Derbyshire)
- Mrs Joan Cowell. Headteacher, Cowbridge Comprehensive School, Vale of Glamorgan. For services to Education. (Port Talbot, Neath Port Talbot)
- Mrs Barbara Elizabeth Cross. Headteacher, Barton Primary School, Torquay, Devon. For services to Education. (Exeter, Devon)
- Colonel The Honourable Richard Nicholas Crossley, TD, DL. For services to the community, especially the Ocean Youth Trust, in North East England. (Malton, North Yorkshire)
- Mrs Eleanor Jean Currie. Lately Director of Education, East Renfrewshire Council. For services to Education. (Millhall by Eaglesham, Glasgow)
- Ms Ann Darnbrough. Director, National Information Forum. For services to Disabled People. (London, SE15)
- Christopher John Davis. Detective Constable, Thames Valley Police. For services to the Police. (Brackley, Northamptonshire)
- Ian Malcolm Dawson. For services to the St. John Ambulance Civil Aviation Centre. (High Wycombe, Buckinghamshire)
- Christopher Dee. Lately Deputy Director, Diversity and Equality, Department of Trade and Industry. (London, SE26)
- Paul Diamond. For services to the Packaging Industry. (Londonderry)
- Mrs Ann Dolphin. Deputy Change Director, HM Board of Inland Revenue. (Darlington, Durham)
- William Duffy. Principal, St. Mary's, Kenmure. For services to Special Needs Education. (Bishopbriggs, Glasgow)
- Miss Rosemary Carole Dunhill. Lately County Archivist, Hampshire Record Office. For services to Archives. (Winchester, Hampshire)
- Francis Dunnet. Chairman, Holland House Electrical Co. Ltd. For services to Shipbuilding and Electrical Engineering. (Wemyss Bay, Renfrewshire)
- Robert Dewar Dunsmore. Conservator, Highland Conservancy, Forestry Commission. (Dingwall, Ross and Cromarty)
- Stephen Alexander Edwards. Director, East Manchester Education Action Zone. For services to the New Deal for Young People. (Birkenhead, Merseyside)
- William Edwards. For services to Cricket in Wales. (Swansea)
- Toby Ewin. Grade B2, Ministry of Defence. (London)
- Elizabeth Boscawen The Viscountess Falmouth, DL. For charitable services to the community in Cornwall.
- Robin Leimpster Farmer. Chairman, Mid-Cheshire Hospitals NHS Trust. For services to Health Care. (Chester, Cheshire)
- Robert Scholes Ferguson. For services to Health Care. (Muckamore, Antrim)
- Mrs Mary Kathleen Fielder. Lately HM Inspector of Probation. For services to the Probation Service. (Alderley Edge, Cheshire)
- David Gant. Lately Deputy Governor, HM Prison Full Sutton, HM Prison Service, Home Office. (Harrogate, North Yorkshire)
- Mrs Gillian Denise Garbutt. Community Education Manager, Northern Ryedale District, Pickering, North Yorkshire. For services to Young People. (Pickering, North Yorkshire)
- Stephen Gardiner, Architect. For services to Community Architecture. (London, SW3)
- Michael Vincent Garnett. Area Director, HM Board of Inland Revenue. (Eastbourne, East Sussex)
- Richard David Harvey Gem. For services to the Cathedrals Fabric Commission for England. (Leighton Buzzard, Bedfordshire)
- Nicholas Frank John Gibbons, MBE. Crisis Management Team Leader, Cabinet Office. (Sunbury-on-Thames, Middlesex)
- John Lane-Gilhespy. Assistant Secretary of Commissions, Lord Chancellor's Department. (Grantham, Lincolnshire)
- Professor Dudley Trevor Goodhead. Director, Radiation and Genome Stability Unit, Medical Research Council. For services to Medical Research. (Oxford, Oxfordshire)
- Alexander Grant. Director, Norfrost Ltd. For services to Engineering and the Environment. (West Watten, Caithness)
- Michael Green. Lately Chairman, Southern Tourist Board. For services to Tourism. (Christchurch, Dorset)
- Barry Griffiths. Violinist. For services to Music. (Sevenoaks, Kent)
- Donald Hale. Lately Editor, The Matlock Mercury. For services to campaign journalism. (Matlock, Derbyshire)
- Mrs Marjory Maud Hall. For services to the Townswomen's Guild. (Preston, Lancashire)
- Miss Judith Christine Hanratty. Company Secretary, BP. For services to the Oil and Gas Industry. (London, SW3)
- Charles St. John Hartnell. For services to the community in Bristol. (Temple Cloud, Bristol)
- Ms Kato Havas, Violin and Viola Teacher. For services to Music. (Oxford, Oxfordshire)
- James Joseph Heaney. Deputy Director, HM Board of Inland Revenue. (Ballymena, Antrim)
- Ms Merylyn Anne McKenzie Hedger. Lately Director, UK Climate Impacts Programme. For services to Climate Change Assessment.
- Neil Heslop. For services to BT and to Blind in Business. (Beaconsfield, Buckinghamshire)
- Mrs Pearl Daisy Jebaranee Hettiaratchy. Consultant. For services to Old Age Psychiatry.
- Thomas Hill. Vice-president, National Council for Voluntary Youth Services. For services to Young People. (Trowbridge, Wiltshire)
- Norman Frederick Hoare. Headteacher, St. George's School, Hertfordshire. For services to Education. (Harpenden, Hertfordshire)
- Michael Horovitz, Poet. For services to Literature. (London, W11)
- John Horton. Operations Director, Alvis Vehicles Ltd. For services to the Defence Industry. (Wolverhampton, West Midlands)
- John Le May Howard. Director of Safety Policy, Royal Society for Prevention of Accidents. For services to Safety. (Birmingham, West Midlands)
- Ian Campbell Purves-Hume. For services to the Agricultural Benevolent Society. (Gorebridge, Midlothian)
- Noel Campbell Hunter. Director of Libraries, Heritage and Trading Standards, Warwickshire County Council. For services to Trading Standards. (Lighthorne, Warwickshire)
- Professor Janet Elizabeth Siarey Husband. Professor of Diagnostic Radiology, Royal Marsden NHS Trust and Institute of Cancer Research, University of London. For services to Cancer Imaging.
- Margaret Mary, Lady Huxtable. For services to the Soldiers', Sailors' and Airmen's Families Association in North Yorkshire. (Leyburn, North Yorkshire)
- Mrs Marjorie Imlah, JP. For services to the Wrens Association. (Cheltenham, Gloucestershire)
- Mrs Patricia Jackson. Manager, Birchwood Access and Training Centre, Lincoln. For services to Training and Skills. (Lincoln, Lincolnshire)
- Paul Jenkins. National Project Manager, NHS Direct, Department of Health. (Leeds, West Yorkshire)
- Denis Frederick Jessopp, MBE. Chair, Gwent Healthcare NHS Trust. For services to the NHS. (Crickhowell, Powys)
- Ms Marie Jones, Actress and Playwright. For services to Drama. (Belfast)
- Neil Anthony Jones, TD, DL. Principal Estates Surveyor, National Assembly for Wales. (Cardiff, South Glamorgan)
- Andrew Charles Keenan. Solicitor. For services to the Legal Aid Board in London. (Bromley, Kent)
- Anthony Denis Kennan. For services to the Disabled Persons Transport Advisory Committee. (Gosforth, Newcastle upon Tyne)
- Mrs Elizabeth Anne Keys. For services to Rural Development. (Moneymore, Londonderry)
- Squadron Leader Kenneth Christopher Kime. Royal Air Force. For services to the Soldiers', Sailors' and Airmen's Families Association-Forces Help in Cleveland.
- Mrs Terry King. Grade 6, Department for Work and Pensions. (Bradford, West Yorkshire)
- Miss Betty Laine, Founder, Laine Theatre Arts, Surrey. For services to the Performing Arts. (Epsom, Surrey)
- Francis Patrick Lennon. Headteacher, St. Modan's High School, Stirling. For services to Education. (Rutherglen, Glasgow)
- Mrs Christine Elizabeth Lewis. Chair, Wales Agri-Food Partnership. For services to Agriculture and to the Food Industry. (Penrhyndeudraeth, Gwynedd)
- Professor David Noel Livingstone. For services to Geography and History. (Belfast)
- Gerald Lowe. For services to the Food Industry. (Carryduff, Belfast)
- Martin John Brodie Lowe. Lately Secretary to the University of Edinburgh. For services to Higher Education. (Gullane, East Lothian)
- David Charles Lunn. For services to the English Tourism Council. (Bourne End, Buckinghamshire)
- Thomas Storrar Macadam. Dental Surgeon. For services to Dentistry and to the General Dental Council. (Kirkintilloch, Dunbartonshire)
- Ewan Beaton MacDonald. Senior Lecturer, Department of Health, University of Glasgow. For services to Occupational Medicine. (Kirkintilloch, Dunbartonshire)
- William Magee. Secretary, Accounts Commission for Scotland. For services to Local Government. (Edinburgh)
- Gordon Laurence Mann. Managing Director, Crichton Trust and Crichton Development Co. Ltd. For services to Higher Education. (Kirkcudbright, Dumfries)
- Maurice Marshall. Grade B2, Ministry of Defence. (Tonbridge, Kent)
- Geoffrey John Marston. For services to the Sheffield Forgemasters Group and to Export. (Sheffield, South Yorkshire)
- David Stanley Martin. Parliamentary Clerk, HM Treasury. (Walderslade, Kent)
- Mrs Elizabeth Angela Mason, JP. For services to the Administration of Justice in Birmingham. (Birmingham, West Midlands)
- Professor Paul Michael Mather. For services to the Remote Sensing and Photogrammetry Society. (Nottingham, Nottinghamshire)
- Mrs Joan McCloy. Lately President, Irish Hockey Association. For services to Hockey. (Belfast)
- Brian Shane McElney. For services to the Bath Museum of East Asian Art. (Bath, Somerset)
- Martin McGuigan. For services to the Electronics Industry. (Ballymoney, Antrim)
- James Stanley McIlvenny. For services to Economic Development. (Eglinton, Londonderry)
- Ronald John McLean. Counsellor, Glasgow Opportunities. For services to Inventors in Scotland. (Ayr, Ayrshire and Arran)
- Mrs Evelyn Mary Collette McNelis. For services to Business Education. (Londonderry)
- Gordon Robert Meek. For services to the Rural Economy in Northumberland. (Ponteland, Northumberland)
- Edwin Robert Mills, JP. For services to the Administration of Justice in Nottinghamshire. (Nottingham, Nottinghamshire)
- Mrs Elizabeth Mills. Third Age Adviser, Science Museum. For services to Ageing Research. (Oxford, Oxfordshire)
- Christopher Robert Mitchell. Chairman, Community Services Committee. For services to the Corporation of London. (Great Missenden, Buckinghamshire)
- Miss Diane Hope Montague. For services to Agricultural Journalism. (Bromley, Kent)
- David Shaw Moore, TD. Chief Executive, Association for Science Education. For services to Science Education. (Solihull, West Midlands)
- Andrew Valentine Morris. Chief Executive, Frimley Park Hospital NHS Trust. For services to the NHS. (Camberley, Surrey)
- Hugh Trevor Morris. Divisional Veterinary Manager, Department for Environment, Food and Rural Affairs. (Llandudno, Conwy)
- Timothy Chadwick Morris. Senior Manager, Lifer Unit, HM Prison Service, Home Office. (Haywards Heath, West Sussex)
- Mrs Elizabeth Janet Morrison. Lead Cancer Support Nurse, Kingston NHS Trust. For services to Cancer Patients. (Surbiton, Surrey)
- Miss Margaret Marie Murray. Nurse Consultant, Orthopaedic Nursing Practice, South Tees Hospital NHS Trust. For services to Health Care. (Middlesbrough, North Yorkshire)
- Colin Raymond Mylchreest. Grade 7, Food Standards Agency. (Letchworth, Hertfordshire)
- Gordon Neale. Chief Executive, Disability Sport England. For services to Disabled Sport. (Whitley Bay, Tyne and Wear)
- Mrs Stella Newton. Area Director, HM Board of Inland Revenue. (Bradford, West Yorkshire)
- David Noble. Chief Executive, Association of Drainage Authorities. For services to Flood Defence and to Land Drainage. (St Agnes, Cambridgeshire)
- William Andrew Oddy, lately Keeper of Conservation, British Museum. For services to Museum Conservation. (Berkhamsted, Hertfordshire)
- Iain Stanley Ovens. Principal, Dundee College. For services to Further Education. (Barnton, Edinburgh)
- John Joseph Owens. Chief Executive, Lanarkshire Acute Hospitals NHS Trust. For services to the NHS. (Bothwell, Lanarkshire)
- Arabinda Palit. Lately Consultant Paediatrician, Pembrokeshire and Derwen NHS Trust. For services to Medicine. (Narberth, Pembrokeshire)
- James Gordon Parker. Registrar. For services to the Public Lending Right. (Stockton-on-Tees, Durham)
- The Venerable Brian Harold Partington. For services to the community, especially Sport, on the Isle of Man. (Douglas, Isle of Man)
- James Richard John Partridge, Founder and Chief Executive, Changing Faces; director, Centre for Appearance and Disfigurement Research, University of the West of England. For services to Disabled People. (London, SW7)
- Nicholas Pearson. For financial services to Charities. (Saffron Walden, Essex)
- Christopher Peat. Acting Assistant Director of Training, Leeds City Council. For services to Adult Learning. (Leeds, West Yorkshire)
- Terence Pepper. Curator of Photographs, National Portrait Gallery. For services to Photography and Art. (London, W9)
- Mrs Katharine Hilary Ross Philbrick. Joint Co-ordinator, Kids VIP. For services to Prisoners' Children. (Glasgow)
- Robin Hylton Murray-Philpson, DL. For services to the Leicestershire and Rutland Crimebeat. (Market Harborough, Leicestershire)
- David Pigott. Chief Executive, Lanarkshire NHS Board. For services to Health Care and to Local Government. (Dalkeith, Midlothian)
- Professor David Ian Alistair Poll. For services to the Cranfield College of Aeronautics. (Turvey, Bedfordshire)
- Christopher Charles Pond. Head, Reference and Reader Services, Library and president, Trade Union Side, House of Commons. (Loughton, Essex)
- David Porritt. Lately Head of Systems Certifications, Vehicle Certification Agency, Department for Transport, Local Government and the Regions. (Thornbury, Gloucestershire)
- Andrew Keith Wyatt Powell. Lately Grade B2, Ministry of Defence. (Luton, Bedfordshire)
- Ms Hope Powell, Coach, England Women's Football. For services to Association Football. (London, SE15)
- Michael Powell. Director of Human Resources and Chief Nursing Adviser, Grampian Health Board. For services to the NHS. (Aberdeen)
- Norman Edwin Price. For services to the Confederation of British Industry in the West Midlands. (Kiddeminster, Worcestershire)
- Mrs Stella Margret Price. Chair, Dyfed Powys Health Authority. For services to the NHS. (Pembroke, Pembrokeshire)
- Miss Thelma Probert. Headteacher, Golden Hillock School (specialist sports college), Birmingham. For services to Education. (Birmingham, West Midlands)
- Robert Punchard. Team Leader, Regional Office South West, Department of Trade and Industry. (East Looe, Cornwall)
- Andrew James Purkis. Chief Executive. For services to the Diana, Princess of Wales Memorial Fund. (London, SW12)
- Leslie John Rackham. Lately Mastermap Manager, Ordnance Survey, Department for Transport, Local Government and the Regions. (Romsey, Hampshire)
- Ian Rankin, Writer. For services to Literature. (Edinburgh)
- Mrs Piali Ray. Director, SAMPAD. For services to the Arts. (Birmingham, West Midlands)
- Christopher Bernard Anthony Reynolds. Headteacher, St. Benedict School, Derby. For services to Education and the Arts. (Derby, Derbyshire)
- Mrs Mary Patricia Riordan. For services to Elderly People. (Newtownabbey, Antrim)
- John Stewart Russell Ritchie. Actuary. For services to the Pension Provision Group. (Edinburgh)
- Mrs Patricia Ritchie. Lately Director, Caledonian MacBrayne. For services to Public Transport in Scotland. (Drymen, Glasgow)
- Professor Anthony William Robards. Pro Vice-chancellor, University of York. For services to Higher Education. (York, North Yorkshire)
- Colonel Patrick John Carmichael Robinson, TD, DL. For services to the West Midland Reserve Forces and Cadets Association. (Solihull, West Midlands)
- Hugh Ross. Head, Innovation Grants, Scottish Executive. (Currie, Midlothian)
- Mrs Jennifer Rudge. Chief Executive, Connexions Cornwall and Devon. For services to Careers Education and Guidance. (Bodmin, Cornwall)
- Martin Thraves Rudge, JP. Chief Executive, Home Improvement Trust. For services to the Living Condition of People in Need. (Nottingham, Nottinghamshire)
- Daniel Patrick Carroll La Rue, Entertainer. For charitable services.
- Mrs Rosemary Helen Johnson-Sabine. Exploration Manager, Chevron Texaco North Sea. For services to the Oil and Gas Industry. (Newark, Nottinghamshire)
- Roger William Sanders. For services to the Small Business Practitioner Panel. (London, SW1P)
- Thomas Alexander Scholes. Chief Executive, Renfrewshire Council. For services to Local Government. (Paisley, Renfrewshire)
- Mrs Jagir Kaur Sekhon. For services to the community in Greenwich, London. (London, SE18)
- Mrs Mary Agnes Sinfield. Lately Grade B2, Ministry of Defence. (London, SW19)
- Mrs Janina Dutkowski-Southworth. Recruitment Strategy Manager, Lancashire County Council. For services to Education. (Blackpool, Lancashire)
- Professor John Edward Spence, Academic Adviser, Royal College of Defence Studies. For services to the Ministry of Defence. (Bucknell, Shropshire)
- Derek Percival Spooner. For services to the Design of Hospices. (Bromsgrove, Worcestershire)
- Mrs Barbara Marion Stephens. Lately Chief Executive, Local Government Commission for England. For services to Local Government. (Workington, Cumbria)
- Richard Stevens. For services to the Modernisation of the Court Service. (Newcastle under Lyne, Staffordshire)
- Mrs Margaret Edythe Stone. Lately Principal, Norham Community Technology College, North Tyneside. For services to Education. (Newcastle upon Tyne, Tyne and Wear)
- David Suchet, Actor. For services to Drama. (Pinner, Middlesex)
- Victor Paul Suller. Senior Physicist, Daresbury Laboratory. For services to Science. (Knutsford, Cheshire)
- John Alexander Sutherland. For services to the British Red Cross Society. (South Wirral, Merseyside)
- Mrs Beth Hope Taylor. Manager, Community Services Pharmacy, Southwark Primary Care Trust. For services to the NHS. (London, SE24)
- Miss Jennifer Graham Taylor. For Public Service. (Belfast)
- Peter Taylor, Correspondent, BBC. For services to Broadcast Journalism. (London)
- Miss Elizabeth Ruth Templar. Headteacher, Urchfont CE Primary School, Wiltshire. For services to Education. (Devizes, Wiltshire)
- Mrs Babette Thomas. Chairman and Chief Executive, Network Training Ltd. For services to Lifelong Learning. (Merthyr Tydfil, Mid Glamorgan)
- The Reverend Canon Paul Thomas. For services to St. Luke's Hospital for the Clergy. (London, W1T)
- Mrs Ruth Thompson. For services to the New Deal in Tyne and Wear. (Sunderland, Tyne and Wear)
- Gordon Topping. For services to Education. (Ballymena, Antrim)
- Ivan Gordon Tucker. Principal, Mary Hare Grammar School. For services to the Education of Deaf People. (Newbury, Berkshire)
- Balbir Singh Uppal, JP. For services to the community in Huddersfield. (Huddersfield, West Yorkshire)
- Mrs Patricia Mary Vaz. Director of Customer Services, BT. For services to Telecommunications. (Chestfield, Kent)
- Ms Parminder Vir, Producer and Diversity Adviser, Carlton Television. For services to Broadcasting and Film. (London, NW10)
- George James Stewart Wallis. International Director. For services to OXFAM. (Oxford, Oxfordshire)
- Professor Eric Sidney Watkins. For services to Formula One and Motor Racing.
- Michael Alfred Healey Webb. For services to St. John Ambulance. (Worthing, West Sussex)
- Ms Lesley Anne Webber. For services to the Property Industry and the DTLR's Property Advisory Group. (Chigwell, Essex)
- Brigadier Anthony Cleland Welch. Head, Field Office Kosovo, Department for International Development. (Havant, Hampshire)
- Peter John Westlake. Headteacher, West Thornton Primary School, Croydon, Surrey. For services to Education.
- Norman Hamflett White. Head, Financial Scrutiny Unit, Department for Education and Skills. (Chesterfield, Derbyshire)
- Clive Wilcox. For Public Service. (London)
- David Wilkinson. Headteacher, Pennywell School, Sunderland. For services to Education.(Shincliffe Village, Durham)
- Ian James Williamson. Grade B2, Ministry of Defence. (BFPO 53)
- Thomas Jeremy Willoughby. Group Compliance and Risk director, Schroders plc. For services to the PIA and IMRO. (London, N1)
- Ms Jacqueline Wilson. For services to Literacy in Schools. (Kingston upon Thames, Surrey)
- Robert James Wood, QPM. Deputy Chief Constable, Derbyshire Constabulary. For services to the Police. (Stanley Common, Derbyshire)
- Clive Ronald Woodward. Head Coach, England Rugby Union Team. For services to Rugby Union Football. (Cookham, Berkshire)

Diplomatic Service and Overseas

- Jasim Ahmed. For services to British commercial interests in Asia.
- Ramon Douglas Alberga, Q.C. For public service, Cayman Islands.
- John Brian Arnold. For services to British commercial interests in Indonesia.
- Robin Aubrey Comyns Berkeley. For services to British commercial interests overseas.
- Keith Biddle. For services to law and order in Sierra Leone.
- Thomas Marshal Boyd. For services to rural development in Africa.
- William Alexander Graham Boyle. For public service, Bermuda.
- Keith Edward Bush. For services to the promotion of democracy in Central Europe.
- Robert Callard, First Secretary, Foreign and Commonwealth Office.
- William Barry Douglas, Concert pianist. For services to music.
- Howard Ronald Drake, Director of Investment, British Consulate-General New York.
- John Henry Freel. For services to British business and community interests in Saudi Arabia.
- Brigid Catherine, Mrs. Gardner, Principal, St George’s British International School, Rome.
- Jeanne-Marie, Mrs. Gescher. For services to British interests in China.
- Roderick Charles Gow. For services to British business interests in the USA.
- Colin Graham. For services to British opera and music in the USA.
- Richard George Grimshaw. For services to agricultural development overseas.
- The Reverend Canon Dennis Albert John Gurney. For services to the community in the Middle East.
- Richard Farrar Hardwick, Director, British Council, Karachi.
- Joan Philomena, Mrs. Hunt. For services to cancer care in southern Spain.
- Shanker Iyer. For services to British commercial interests in Singapore.
- Ivor Levene. For services to British trade and investment in Africa and the Middle East.
- Scott Livingstone, First Secretary, Foreign and Commonwealth Office.
- Derrick Isaac Marcus. For services to the British community in Sao Paulo.
- Thomas Geoffrey Martin, lately Head, European Commission Office, London.
- Raymond Mason. For services to sculpture and to Anglo-French relations.
- Ian Massey. For services to the aerospace industry overseas.
- Colonel Alexander Robert Renwick McAslan. For services to international standards in demining.
- William Moore. For services to British commercial interests overseas.
- John Hamish Forbes Murphy. For services to British commercial interests in Italy.
- Miss Helen Rosemary Nellthorp, First Secretary, Foreign and Commonwealth Office.
- Patrick Eldred Owens M.B.E., H.M. Consul, British Consulate General New York.
- David John Parker, lately Senior Management Officer, British Embassy Jakarta.
- Roger Howard Patey. For services to British commercial interest in Egypt.
- Dr. Brian Derek Perry. For services to veterinary science in developing countries.
- Miss Lynn Rachel Redgrave. For services to acting and the cinema and to the British community in Los Angeles.
- Patricia Margaret, Mrs. Salti. For services to women’s and children’s rights in the Middle East.
- Arnold Martin Schwartzman. For services to the British film industry in the USA.
- Donald John Sloan, lately Director, British Council, Sudan.
- Daniel Wybert Mansel Smith. For services to UK- Norway relations.
- The Reverend John Gregory Stevens. For services to leprosy and the community, Calcutta.
- Leslie John Stokes. For services to British business interests in Taiwan and The Philippines.
- Llewellyn Vorley. For service to the community, Bermuda.
- Philip Warner. For services to British commercial interests in the USA.
- Paul Robert Wiseman, Head, British School, Rio de Janeiro.
- Dr. Teresa Lyn Wright. For services to the study of Hepatitis and liver disease in the USA.
- Andrew Michael Graham-Yooll. For services to broadcasting and journalism in Argentina.

==== Member (MBE) ====
- Ms Naseem Aboobaker. Co-ordinator. For services to Mushkil Aasaan, London. (London, SW17)
- David Abrahamson. Lately consultant Psychiatrist. For services to Medicine. (London, NW11)
- Ian Michael Adams. Regional Water Quality manager, Environment Agency. For services to Water Quality. (Reading, Berkshire)
- Michael Charles Adams. Assistant Site Services manager, Newham College, London. For services to Further Education. (London, E6)
- Mrs Josephine Adlard. Learning Support assistant, St. Martin's CE Infants School, Salisbury, Wiltshire. For services to Education. (Salisbury, Wiltshire)
- Mohammed Adris. Special Constable, West Midlands Police. For services to the Police. (Birmingham, West Midlands)
- Faruque Ahmed. For services to the Bangladeshi community in Cheshire. (Hyde, Cheshire)
- William John Alden. For services to Vocational Education and Training. (Bicester, Oxfordshire)
- Thomas William Allen. Nurseryman, James Coles and Sons. For services to Horticulture in Leicestershire. (Leicester, Leicestershire)
- Miss Jane Amess. Revenue Officer, HM Board of Inland Revenue. (Spalding, Lincolnshire)
- Ms Lea Anderson. Choreographer. For services to Dance. (London, SE15)
- Stuart Anderson. Officer in Charge, Employment Service, Department for Work and Pensions. (Staines, Middlesex)
- Mrs Marie Therese Sylvette Appadoo. Administrative Officer, Department of Trade and Industry. (London, SE1)
- Howard Dan Arden. Photographer. For services to the community in Newport, Shropshire. (Newport, Shropshire)
- Mrs Elizabeth Margaret Armour. For services to the St. John Ambulance Brigade. (Coleraine, Londonderry)
- David George Armstrong. For services to Journalism. (Portadown, Armagh)
- Murray Armstrong. For services to the Fire Services National Benevolent Fund. (Newtownabbey, Antrim)
- Robert Armstrong. For services to Entertainment in Hawick, Roxburghshire.
- John Brian Ashley. For services to the community in Hunsdon, Hertfordshire. (Ware, Hertfordshire)
- Thomas David Ayres. For services to the community in Farnham, Surrey. (Farnham, Surrey)
- Mrs Brenda Badcock. For services to Childminding in Richmond-upon-Thames, Surrey. (Hampton, Middlesex)
- Miss Molly Badham. Director, Twycross Zoo. For services to the Conservation of Endangered Species. (Atherstone, Warwickshire)
- The Rev Canon James Henry Baker. Founder, Whitehaven Youth Trust. For services to Young People in Cumbria. (Whitehaven, Cumbria)
- Mrs Janice Baker. Executive Officer, Child Support Agency, Department for Work and Pensions. (Pett, East Sussex)
- Mrs Janet Barber. Lately head of Maritime Resources, National Maritime Museum. For services to Museums. (Bromley, Kent)
- Miss Melanie Barber. Deputy Librarian and Archivist. For services to Lambeth Palace Library. (London, SE23)
- Philip Barbour. Honorary Treasurer. For services to Brook Advisory Centres. (London, NW11)
- Mrs Kath Barnes. Nursing Auxiliary. For services to People with Substance Misuse Problems in Sheffield, South Yorkshire. (Sheffield, South Yorkshire)
- Kenneth Charles Barr. Bookbinder. For services to the Institute of Historical Research, University of London. (London, SE15)
- Christopher John Bassett. Lately Principal Engineer, QinetiQ. For services to the Defence Industry. (Malvern, Worcestershire)
- Mrs Rosemarie May Batt. Sponsor. For services to ActionAid. (Ramsgate, Kent)
- Bryan Percy Beattie, JP. For services to the community in Bedlington, Northumberland. (Bedlington, Northumberland)
- Mrs Joyce Beaumont. Chair of Governors, Bishop Rawstorne CE International Language College, Lancashire. For services to Education. (Leyland, Lancashire)
- Mrs Jean Margaret Beeden. For charitable services to the Bedford Hospital. (Bedford, Bedfordshire)
- Mrs Judith Bell. Farmer and cheese maker. For services to the community in Thirsk, North Yorkshire. (Thirsk, North Yorkshire)
- Alexander Bennett. Special Constable, Highland Police. For services to the Police. (Kingussie, Inverness-shire)
- David Bennett. Religious Education Teacher, Babington Community Technology College, Leicester. For services to Education. (Leicester, Leicestershire)
- John Francis Best. Executive Officer, Benefits Agency, Department for Work and Pensions. (St Austell, Cornwall)
- Mrs Elizabeth Bethel. Lately Housekeeping Supervisor, Tredegar and Ebbw Vale Hospitals. For services to the NHS and to the community. (Blaenau Gwent, Gwent)
- Mrs Susan Mary Beuzeval. Personal assistant. For services to OXFAM. (Oxford, Oxfordshire)
- Mrs Betty Eirwen Bevan. Lately Carer and Home Help, Bridgend, South Wales. For services to the community. (Bridgend, Mid Glamorgan)
- Darshan Singh Bhogal. For services to Community Life and the promotion of Asian Languages in the West Midlands. (Birmingham, West Midlands)
- Paul Dennis Biddle. Lately Operations manager, National Operations Unit, HM Prison Service Headquarters, Home Office. (Nr Honiton, Devon)
- Henry Blackley. For services to the Citizens Advice Bureau and to the community in Penicuik, Midlothian.
- Mrs Barbara Anne Blaney. Special Educational Needs Co-ordinator, Chalvedon School and Sixth Form College, Basildon, Essex. For services to Education. (Chelmsford, Essex)
- Maurice Caldwell Blease. For services to Higher Education. (Belfast)
- David Bohannan. Senior Executive Officer, Home Office. (London, E15)
- Karamjit Singh Bolina. Senior Customs Officer, Cargo Anti-Smuggling, HM Board of Customs and Excise. (Houslow, Middlesex)
- James Brian Bonsor. For services to Teaching Music, especially the Recorder.
- John Edric Boulden. For services to the community in Plympton, Devon. (Plymouth, Devon)
- Mrs Rosalind Berry Bourne. For services to Mental Health Carers in Somerset. (Wellington, Somerset)
- Mrs Carol Bowery. For services to Improving Education Services for Teenage Mothers. (Bath, Somerset)
- Thomas Boyd. Lately Captain, Celtic Football Club. For services to Association Football. (Bothwell, Lanarkshire)
- Colin Bradbury. Lately Dean of Students, University College, Northampton. For services to Higher Education. (Northampton, Northamptonshire)
- David Bradley. For Public Service. (Belfast)
- Professor Roger Kaines Breakwell. Head, Camberwell College of Arts, London. For services to Art Education. (London, SE5)
- George Paterson Bremner. For services to the community in Kings Park, Glasgow. (Clarkston, Glasgow)
- Mrs Hilary Brittain. Secretary, Pulse Trust, Birmingham. For services to Health Care. (Lichfield, West Midlands)
- Dennis Percy James Bromley. Lately E1, Ministry of Defence. (London, N15)
- Mrs Beverley Jane Brooks. For services to the Community. (Beeston, Nottinghamshire)
- Alfred Bruce. Lately Driver, Mobile Draper's Van. For services to the community in North and East Scotland. (Aboyne, Aberdeenshire)
- Mrs Joan Margery Brutnell. For services to the Royal British Legion in Leicestershire. (Melton Mowbry, Leicestershire)
- The Reverend Jackson Crawford Buick. For services to the community. (Belfast)
- Mrs Norma Jean Bull. School secretary, Godwin Junior School, Newham, London. For services to Education. (London, E7)
- Alfred George Bunner. For services to Athletics for Young People. (Frodsham, Cheshire)
- Joseph Burbidge. For services to the community in Seend, Wiltshire. (Melksham, Wiltshire)
- Jeffrey Edmund Burchfield. Sergeant, Metropolitan Police Service. For services to the Police. (Upminster, Essex)
- Robert Burns. Leading Ambulance Technician. For services to the Scottish Ambulance Service. (Glasgow)
- Mrs Ruby Burns. For services to Pre-School Education at Cardonald College, Glasgow. (Glasgow)
- Christopher Robin Burrough. For services to the community in Marston Meysey, Wiltshire. (Cricklade, Wiltshire)
- Mrs Elizabeth Anne Burrows, JP. For services to the community in Attleborough, Norfolk. (Attleborough, Norfolk)
- Miss Barbara Olive Butcher. Journalist, Kentish Express. For services to the community. (Ashford, Kent)
- Alan George Calvin. Grade D, Ministry of Defence. (London)
- Wing Cdr Donald Gilchrist Cameron. For services to the Royal Air Forces Association in Diss, Norfolk. (Diss, Norfolk)
- Hugh Duncan Campbell, JP. For services to the community in Pitlochry, Perthshire. (Pitlochry, Perth and Kinross)
- Mrs Rebecca Campbell. Lately Mess Hand, Ministry of Defence. (London)
- Mrs Susan Jane Maynard Campbell. Lately Chair, ACDET. For services to Disabled People. (Horbury, West Yorkshire)
- Mrs Susan Elizabeth Cara. Director for Programmes and Policy, National Institute of Adult Continuing Education. For services to Adult Education. (Norwich, Norfolk)
- Miss Mary Isabel Carroll. For services to Homeless People in Perth. (Scone, Perth and Kinross)
- Mrs Joan Patricia Carter. For services to the Jersey Public Sculpture Trust. (Jersey, Channel Islands)
- Paul Carter. For services to the Bulwell Education Action Zone, Nottinghamshire. (Litchfield, Staffordshire)
- Kenneth John Castle. Welfare Funds manager, Metropolitan Police Service. For services to the Police. (Tonbridge, Kent)
- Colin Jennison Cawthorn. Member, Keyworth Parish Council, Nottinghamshire. For services to Local Government. (Keyworth, Nottinghamshire)
- Mrs Janet Harrison Chadband. For services to the community in Port Isaac, Cornwall. (Port Isaac, Cornwall)
- Miss Barbara Chadwick. For services to the Disabled Drivers' Association for Oxford. (Oxford, Oxfordshire)
- Keith Chadwick. For charitable services to the community in Alderney. (Alderney, Channel Islands)
- Mrs Sheila Margaret Chalmers. Grade E1, Ministry of Defence. (Mintlaw, Aberdeenshire)
- Christopher John Patrick Chambers. Manager, Somerset Partnership-Mental Health Team. For services to Social and Health Care. (Somerton, Somerset)
- Ms Anne Chan. For services to Children in London. (London, SE27)
- Mrs Ellen Chapman. Lately Member, Craven District Council. For services to the community in Austwick, Lancashire. (Lancaster, Lancashire)
- Kenneth Norman Chapman. Dairyman. For services to the community in Woodchurch, Kent. (Ashford, Kent)
- Bashir Chaudhry. For services to the community in East London and Essex. (Ilford, Essex)
- Robin John Cherry. For services to the Potato Industry. (Ballymena, Antrim)
- David Alexander Cheyne. Senior Policy Adviser, HM Board of Customs and Excise. (London, SE27)
- Mrs Marion Chirnside. For services to the community in Benwell, Tyne and Wear. (Newcastle upon Tyne, Tyne and Wear)
- Mrs Olive Clapp. For services to the community in Luppitt, Devon. (Honiton, Devon)
- Mrs Roberta Alice Clark. Lately Executive Officer, Driver and Vehicle Licensing Agency, Department for Transport, Local Government and the Regions. (Dundee)
- Erlander Cleophas Clarke. Specialist Inspector, Health and Safety Executive, Department for Transport, Local Government and the Regions. (Wakefiled, West Yorkshire)
- Eustace James Clarke. For services to the Multi-Cultural Education and Youth Project, Lewisham, London. (London, SE3)
- Mrs Mollie Clarke. For services to the British Red Cross Society in Northamptonshire. (Northampton, Northamptonshire)
- Ms Reita-Fay Clarke. For services to the community in Luton, Bedfordshire.
- Mrs Kathleen Spence Clay. Grade E1, Ministry of Defence. (Farnborough, Hampshire)
- Peter John Clayton. For services to the Octavia Hill Birthplace Museum in Wisbech, Cambridgeshire. (Nr Wisbech, Cambridgeshire)
- Mrs Jean Cobb. For charitable services. (London, SW8)
- Norman Derek Cocker. For services to the community in Wilmslow, Cheshire. (Wilmslow, Cheshire)
- Mrs Ella Cole. Lately Governor, Eaglesfield Paddle CE Primary School, Cumbria. For services to Education. (Cockermouth, Cumbria)
- Mrs Marion Elizabeth Collyer. Band 6, Department for Transport, Local Government and the Regions. (Derby, Derbyshire)
- Peter Conlan. Public Health manager, NHS Executive, Trent Regional Office, Department of Health. (Sheffield, South Yorkshire)
- John Connor. Principal Engineer, Raytheon Systems Ltd. For services to the Defence Industry. (Kirkaldy, Fife)
- Christopher Llewellyn Coombes. Deputy chief Fire Officer, Leicestershire Fire Service. For services to the Fire Service. (Loughborough, Leicestershire)
- Miss Agnes Lily Florence Cooperwaite. For services to the Royal Infirmary of Edinburgh. (Edinburgh)
- Mrs Tanya Elizabeth Cottrell. Support Group Administrator, EPSRC. For services to Science. (Swindon, Wiltshire)
- Mrs Eileen Maud Coughlin. For charitable services to the Cancer Research Campaign in Croydon, Surrey. (Sanderstead, Surrey)
- Peter John Coulson. Member, IS Helpdesk. For services to the Financial Services Authority. (Northwood, Middlesex)
- Michel Noel Couriard. For services to the community, especially the Jersey Honorary Police and Young People, in Jersey. (Jersey, Channel Islands)
- William Charles Cox. Lately Station Officer, Norfolk Fire Service. For services to the Fire Service. (Cromer, Norfolk)
- Miss Jean Anne Cragg. Paramedic Team Leader, East Midlands Ambulance Service. For services to Health Care. (Nottingham, Nottinghamshire)
- Arthur Roy Crane. For services to the community in Pontypool, South Wales. (Pontypool, Gwent)
- Charles Edward Crouch. Clerk, Effingham Parish Council, Surrey. For services to the community. (Great Bookham, Surrey)
- Bertram James Culling. For services to the Sunderland Laryngectomee Club and to the National Association of Laryngectomee Clubs. (South Tyneside, Tyne and Wear)
- Mrs Shirley Lesley Culpin. Sergeant, MOD Police, Ministry of Defence. (Marlow, Buckinghamshire)
- Mrs Williamina McPhail Cumming. Manager, Rocking Horse Nursery, University of Aberdeen. For services to Nursery Care. (Aberdeen)
- Michael Curzon. Consultant. For services to the prevention of Bird Smuggling. (Westbury, Wiltshire)
- Mrs Nidhi Dalmia. Member, New Deal Task Force's Minority Ethnic Advisory Group. For services to Unemployed People. (Gerrards Cross, Buckinghamshire)
- Miss Phyllis Margaret Dalton. Costume Designer. For services to the Film Industry. (Yeovil, Somerset)
- Miss Doreen Kathleen Daly. For Public Service. (Dundonald, Belfast)
- Mrs Pamela Mary Darwen. Teacher, Chase Terrace High School, Staffordshire. For services to Education and to Sport. (Stafford, Staffordshire)
- Alun Owen Davies. International Export and Logistics manager, NAAFI. For services to the Defence Industry. (Salisbury, Wiltshire)
- Ms Carys Sian Davies. National Project manager, Defibrillators in Public Places Initiative. For service to Health Care. (London, SW11)
- Howard Islwyn Davies. Head of Technical Policy Development Branch Welsh Assembly Government. (Dolgellau, Gwynedd)
- Philip Alfred Donne Davies. For services to the Hop Industry. (Dormington, Herefordshire)
- Angus Davison. Founder, Haygrove Fruit. For services to the Fruit Industry. (Pixley, Herefordshire)
- Jerome Dawson. For services to the community and to the Credit Union Movement. (Belfast)
- Mrs Niranjana Desai. For services to Education and to the Asian community in Harrow, London. (West Harrow, Middlesex)
- Mrs Wendy Muriel Dibdin. For services to Disabled People in Greenwich, London. (London, SE7)
- Professor Linda Dickens. President, British Universities Industrial Relations Association. For services to Employment Relations. (Leamington Spa, Warwickshire)
- Mrs Joyce Olive Alexandra Dobbin. For services to Housing. (Loughgall, Armagh)
- Mrs Margaret Louise Doidge. For services to the Variety Club of Great Britain in South Wales. (Cardiff, South Glamorgan)
- Francis Michael Donaghy, JP. Accountant. For services to Commerce and Industry. (Belfast)
- Cyril Eric Donnan. For services to the Police. (Belfast)
- Samuel Douglas. For services to the community. (Belfast)
- Ms Jacqueline Downer. For services to People with Learning Disabilities in London. (London, SE17)
- Alan David Irving Drever. Founder, Scottish Native Woods. For services to the Conservation of Woodlands. (Pitlochry, Perth and Kinross)
- Miss Margaret Drury. Health Records Adviser. For services to the East Gloucestershire NHS Trust. (Alderton, Gloucestershire)
- Mrs Audrey May Duck. For services to the community, especially the Good Bears of the World, in Richmond, Surrey. (Twickenham, Middlesex)
- Ernest Frederick Dunckley, DL. For services to the community in Ealing, London. (Northolt, Middlesex)
- Mrs Beryl Kathleen Rose Durrant. For services to the community, especially Elderly People, in Tewkesbury, Gloucestershire. (Tewkesbury, Gloucestershire)
- Adrian Keith Dutson. Sub Officer, London Fire Brigade. For services to the Fire Service. (Hornchurch, Essex)
- George Simpson Dyker. General Medical Practitioner, East Kilbride. For services to Medicine. (East Kilbride, Lanarkshire)
- Mrs Nora Margaret Eaton. For services to the community in Brancaster, Norfolk. (King's Lynn, Norfolk)
- Mrs Afusat Adeite Elias. Lately Administrative Officer, Home Office. (London, SW18)
- James Grenville Ellard. For services to the Royal Marines Association. (Orpington, Kent)
- Mrs Jacqueline Mary Elliott. Governor, Holy Rood Junior and Holy Rood Infant Schools, Watford, Hertfordshire. For services to Education. (Watford, Hertfordshire)
- Christopher Hugh Evans. Adviser, Action Team for Jobs, Employment Service, Department for Work and Pensions. (Marina, Swansea)
- Mrs Moira Rosalind Evans, JP. Lately Headteacher, Penrhiwceiber Junior School, Mountain Ash. For services to Education. (Aberdare, Rhondda Cynon Taff)
- Peter Joseph Evans. Lately Franchise manager, Cheshire Fire Service, The Prince's Trust-Volunteers Programme. For services to Young People. (Northwich, Cheshire)
- Mrs Vera Emma Evans. For charitable services to the Shropshire and Wales Hospice. (Pontebury, Shropshire)
- Cecil Ewing. For services to Public Transport and to Disabled People. (Dromore, Tyrone)
- Mrs Sheila Ord Fabb. Lately Higher Executive Officer, Department for Education and Skills. (Darlington, Durham)
- Maj Leslie John Fagg. Retired Officer 2, Ministry of Defence. (Fringford, Oxfordshire)
- Mrs Elizabeth Fairweather. Administrative Officer, Benefits Agency, Department for Work and Pensions. (Arbroath, Angus)
- Mrs Isabella Farquhar. School Administrator, Woodside Primary School, Aberdeen. For services to Education. (Aberdeen)
- Edwin John Farr. For services to the British Stuttering Association and to the European League of Stammering Associations. (Newcastle upon Tyne, Tyne and Wear)
- Mrs Kathleen Farrimond. For services to People suffering from Strokes. (Llanrwst, Gwynedd)
- Mrs Margaret Ellen Featherstone. For services to the League of Friends at Wansbeck and Ashington Hospitals, Northumberland. (Ashington, Northumberland)
- Nigel Patrick Ferris. Head, Diagnostic Section, World Reference Laboratory. For services to Animal Health. (Pirbright, Surrey)
- Paul Francis Gerard Fitzpatrick. For services to the Police. (Belfast)
- Lt Col Alfred Alexander Forbes. For services to the Army Physical Training Corps Museum. (Farnborough, Hampshire)
- Miss Patricia Forrest. For services to the WRVS in London. (London, SW3)
- Miss Mary Forryan. For services to the community in Hinckley, Leicestershire. (Hinckley, Leicestershire)
- Mrs Elsie Forsyth. Leader. For services to Campaigners Islington in London. (London, EC1)
- Eric Gordon Franklin. City of London Guide. For services to Local History. (London, SE26)
- William Alexander Elrick Fraser. For services to the community in Inverness. (Inverness, Inverness-shire)
- Mrs Harriet Frazer. For services to Memorial Art. (Saxmundham, Suffolk)
- John Alexander French. Model Maker, INSYS. For services to the Defence Industry. (Bedford, Bedfordshire)
- Alexander Francis William Fry. For services to Theatre Roundabout Ltd. (London, NW11)
- James Rush Fyanes. For services to the St. John Ambulance Brigade in Cumbria. (Maryport, Cumbria)
- Miss Tanya Marie Gallagher. For services to Community Relations. (Londonderry)
- Donald Gartside. Director of Estates, Oldham NHS Trust and of Rochdale Healthcare NHS Trust. For services to the NHS.
- David Scobbie Gibb. For services to Entertainment in Hawick, Roxburghshire.
- Professor Michael Gordon Gibbons. Secretary General, Association of Commonwealth Universities. For services to Higher Education. (London, W8)
- Mrs Norma Glass. For services to Racial Understanding in South Wales. (Sketty, Swansea)
- Mrs Gillian Gwyneth Gomery. Senior Nurse, Registration and Inspection Officer, Gwent Health Authority. For services to the NHS. (Abergavenny, Monmouthshire)
- Henry George Goodeve. For services to the community in Guernsey. (Guernsey, Channel Islands)
- Barry Ramon Goodison. For services to the Approved Driving Instructors' Association. (Sheffield, South Yorkshire)
- Paul Lewis John Gray. Usher, Court Service, Lord Chancellor's Department. (London, SW2)
- Brian Greaves. Governor, Glenburn School and Skelmersdale College, Skelmersdale, Lancashire. For services to Education. (Ormskirk, Lancashire)
- Mrs Hazel Gertrude Greene. Support Grade Band 1, Home Office. (Croydon, Surrey)
- John Stuart Gordon Greenwood. For services to the WRVS in Harrogate, North Yorkshire. (Harrogate, North Yorkshire)
- Hubert Robert Harry Gregg. Presenter, BBC. For services to Radio Broadcasting and to Songwriting. (Eastbourne, East Sussex)
- Alan Stanley Griffith. Head, Job Evaluation and Remuneration. For services to the Corporation of London. (London, E6)
- Albert Griffiths. Ambulance Driver, Patient Transport Service, Lancashire Ambulance Service NHS Trust. For services to Health Care. (Ormskirk, Lancashire)
- Hugh Keith Grout. For services to the Royal British Legion in Devon. (Ottery St Mary, Devon)
- Mrs Jill Elizabeth Grumitt. For services to the British Red Cross Society in Jersey. (Jersey, Channel Islands)
- George Michael Guest. For services to the community in Beverley, East Riding of Yorkshire. (Anlaby, East Riding of Yorkshire)
- Mrs Rita Mary Gulliver. For services to Woodley Woolies, Berkshire. (Reading, Berkshire)
- Mrs Nirmal Gupta. For services to Education and to the Hindu community in Southend-on-Sea, Essex. (Shoeburyness, Essex)
- Mrs Hazel Elizabeth Hamer. Administration Officer, Employment Service, Department for Work and Pensions. (Bolton, Lancashire)
- Ian Hammerton. For services to the Woodland Trust in Kent. (Dartford, Kent)
- Nicholas John Hance. Public Relations manager, UKAEA, Harwell. For services to Training in the Nuclear Industry. (Wantage, Oxfordshire)
- Frank Hankinson. Trade Unionist. For services to Employment Relations. (Manchester, Greater Manchester)
- Samuel Acheson Hanna. For services to the community and to Rural Development. (Newry, Down)
- Mrs Margaret Eileen Hanney. Course director, Cardiff School of Education, University of Wales Institute, Cardiff. For services to Education. (Cardiff, South Glamorgan)
- John William Haran. Chairman, Haran Glass. For services to the Construction Industry. (Paisley, Renfrewshire)
- Venichand Ranmal Harania. Managing director, Nucare plc. For services to Pharmacy. (Pinner, Middlesex)
- Miss Sharron Hardman. Head, Resource Provision Unit, Gorsefield County Primary School, Radcliffe, Bury. For services to Special Needs Education. (Stockport, Lancashire)
- Victor Robert Hardy. For charitable services to the Corby Cancer Day Care Hospice. (Corby, Northamptonshire)
- Mrs Rita Naomi Harman. Director, Samaritans, Isle of Wight. For services to Prisoner Welfare. (Newport, Isle of Wight)
- Miss Daphne Harris. For services to Dancing and to the community in North London. (London, W1V)
- Mrs June Rose Hartshorn. School Crossing Patrol, Lanesfield Primary School, Wolverhampton. For services to Road Safety. (Wolverhampton, West Midlands)
- Mrs Patricia Margaret Harvey. Head, Housing Management, Communities Scotland. For services to Housing. (Grangemouth, Stirling and Falkirk)
- Peter Harvey. Journalist, Sheffield Star. For services to Journalism and to the community. (Sheffield, South Yorkshire)
- Peter Hawken. Submarine Project manager, Devonport Management Ltd. For services to the Shipbuilding Industry. (Plymouth, Devon)
- Colin David Hawkins. Administrative Officer, Department for Education and Skills. (London, N17)
- Miss Gillian Mary Hawksworth. For services to Pharmacy in Mirfield, West Yorkshire.
- Richard Ernest Hawthorne. For services to the community in Nottingham. (Nottingham, Nottinghamshire)
- David Gordon Haxton. For services to Prisoner Welfare at HM Prison Barlinnie. (Hamilton, Lanarkshire)
- Mrs Margaret Louisa Hayden. For services to the Glanclwyd Hospital League of Friends, North Wales. (Rhyl, Denbighshire)
- Douglas Henderson. Chief executive, Fresh Produce Consortium. For services to the Fresh Produce Industry. (Stamford, Lincolnshire)
- Miss Valerie Roberta Henderson. For services to Local Government. (Lisburn, Antrim)
- Shaun Walter Henry. For services to Education. (Newtownabbey, Antrim)
- Reginald Herbert. Lately Editor in chief, North Wales Newspapers Group. For services to Journalism. (Wrexham, Clwyd)
- Matthew Hesmondhalgh. Teacher of Children with Autistic Disorders, King Ecgbert School, Sheffield. For services to Special Needs Education. (Sheffield, South Yorkshire)
- George Edward Hewson. Messenger, Amey Business Services. For services to the Defence Industry. (London, SW18)
- Mrs Elizabeth Helen Higton. Assistant head, Witchhill School, Kilmarnock. For services to Special Needs Education. (Darvel, Ayrshire and Arran)
- James Anthony Hill. Managing director, Severn Trent Water International. For services to the Water Industry. (Fillongley, Warwickshire)
- Stephen Anthony Hobday. For services to the community and to Homeless People in Cardiff. (Cardiff, South Glamorgan)
- Mrs Alison Meryl Hodge. For services to the Institute of Physics.
- David Hodson. Senior Driver, First Mainline Ltd. For services to the Bus Industry and to the community in Rotherham. (Rotherham, South Yorkshire)
- Mrs Hazel Mary Hole. Deputy Regional director, Small Business Service, Government Office for the East of England, Department for Education and Skills. (Ipswich, Suffolk)
- Ian Stuart Hollis, JP. Executive Officer, Benefits Agency, Department for Work and Pensions. (Wellingborough, Northamptonshire)
- George Eric Holt. For services to the community in Bradley, Staffordshire. (Stafford, Staffordshire)
- Peter James Home. For services to the Boys' Brigade in Inverness. (Inverness, Inverness-shire)
- Mrs Jenny Hood. Head, Careers and Guidance, Caerleon Comprehensive School, Newport. For services to Education. (Cwymbran, Torfaen)
- Mrs Sandra Hooper. Personal assistant, HM Board of Inland Revenue. (Barnstaple, Devon)
- Michael Esplen Hope. For services to the Hadfield Trust in Cumbria. (Liverpool, Merseyside)
- Godfrey Allan Horne. For services to the community in Tonbridge, Kent.
- Maj John Michael Gibson-Horrocks. For services to the Fusiliers Association. (Cullompton, Devon)
- Mrs Betty Horton. For services to the community in Eyam, Derbyshire. (Hope Valley, Derbyshire)
- Derek Alfred George Hould. Operational Support Grade, HM Young Offender Institution Portland, HM Prison Service, Home Office. (Portland, Dorset)
- Mrs Dorothy Houston. For services to the community in Cumnock, Ayrshire. (Cumnock, Ayrshire and Arran)
- Mrs Brenda Jane Howard. For services to Ecological Research on Radionuclides.
- Mrs Elizabeth Anne Howe. Ward Sister, Guy's and St. Thomas' Hospital Trust, London. For services to Health Care. (London, SW7)
- Douglass Howell, JP. Higher Executive Officer, Child Benefit Centre, Department for Work and Pensions.
- Dennis Brynley Howells. Signals and Telecommunications Engineer, Railtrack. For services to the Railway Industry. (South Harrow, Middlesex)
- Colin Anthony Howes. Keeper of Environmental Records. For services to Environmental Conservation in Doncaster. (Doncaster, South Yorkshire)
- Mrs Pamela Marjorie Hudson. Adviser for Activities, Guide Association, in Peckham and Camberwell, London. For services to Young People. (London, SE14)
- Miss Barbara Louise Hughes. Lately Councillor, London Borough of Camden. For services to Local Government and to Community Safety. (London, NW1)
- Mrs Jessie Margaret Tyley Hughes. Grade D, Ministry of Defence. (41464 Neuss, Germany)
- Mrs Margaret Elizabeth Hughes. For services to the community in Llanishan, Cardiff. (Cardiff, South Glamorgan)
- Mrs Pauline Hughes. For services to the community, especially Social Care, in Nottinghamshire. (Nottingham, Nottinghamshire)
- Miss Mary Halden Hunter. For services to Guiding in Aberdeen.
- Mrs Patricia Hurley. Co-ordinator. For services to the Bristol Victim Support Scheme. (Bristol)
- David John Chalmers Huxtable. For services to Victim Support. (Chichester, West Sussex)
- Gordon Ibinson. Chairman. For services to the Hylton Castle and Townend Farm Boys' Club, Tyne and Wear. (Washington, Tyne and Wear)
- Winston Ince. Train and Instructor Operator. For services to London Underground. (Perivale, Middlesex)
- Miss Vicky Ireland. Artistic director, Polka Theatre, London. For services to Drama for Children. (London, W4)
- Derek Charles George Irwin. For services to Local Government. (Dungannon, Tyrone)
- Mrs June Pauline Jack. Lately president, All England Netball Association. For services to Netball. (Birmingham, West Midlands)
- Charles Richard Jackson. For services to the community in West and North Yorkshire. (Knaresborough, North Yorkshire)
- William Jacob. Receptionist. For services to the Royal Institute of British Architects. (London, SE26)
- Mrs Pamela Jay. Nursery Nurse, Victoria Special School, Birmingham. For services to Special Needs Education. (Birmingham, West Midlands)
- Mrs Valerie Jeal. For services to Homeless People in St. Paul's, Bristol. (Bristol)
- Mrs Joan May Jefferis. Governor, Mason Moor Primary School, Southampton. For services to Education. (Southampton, Hampshire)
- John Hayden Jennings. For services to the community, especially Business, in Great Yarmouth, Norfolk. (Lowestoft, Suffolk)
- Mrs Elizabeth Ann Johnson. Co-ordinator, Daphne Jackson Trust. For services to People returning to careers in Science, Engineering and Technology.
- Arthur Rees Jones. Support Team FLM, HM Board of Inland Revenue. (Pontypridd, Rhondda Cynon Taff)
- John Gordon Jones. Area Training and Development manager, Crown Prosecution Service. (Cardiff, South Glamorgan)
- Miss Marilynne Jennifer Gifford-Jones. Lately Range 3, Insolvency Service, Department of Trade and Industry. (Chester, Cheshire)
- Patrick Blencoe-Jones. Revenue Control manager, London Underground. For services to Public Transport. (Gloucester, Gloucestershire)
- Raymond Read Jones. Integrated Project Team Leader, BAE Systems. For services to the Defence Industry. (Lytham St Annes, Lancashire)
- Norman Bernard Joseph (Norman Jay). Disc Jockey. For services to music. (London, W3)
- Gurdev Singh Kalsi, JP. For services to the Sikh community in Crawley, West Sussex. (Crawley, West Sussex)
- Mrs Helen Keats. Housing Initiatives manager, Portsmouth City Council. For services to Homeless People. (Shorwell, Isle of Wight)
- Harry James Kelly. Site Operations manager, AMS. For services to the Environment. (Titchfield, Hampshire)
- John Patrick Kempson. Leader. For services to the Wolvercote Young People's Club in Oxford. (Oxford, Oxfordshire)
- Mrs Lillian Elizabeth Kennedy. Chair, Strathclyde Elderly Forum. For services to Elderly People and to the community. (Alexandria, Dunbartonshire)
- Miss Mary Kennedy. Grade E2, Ministry of Defence. (London)
- Miss Sadie Kerr. For services to the community, especially Health Care. (Waterside, Londonderry)
- John Robert Ketteringham. For services to the Heritage of Lincolnshire. (Lincoln, Lincolnshire)
- Mrs Margaret Claire Kilby. Business Support Administrator, HM Board of Customs and Excise. (Bridgend, Mid Glamorgan)
- Brian Douglas King. For services to the community in Welwyn and Welwyn Garden City, Hertfordshire. (Knebworth, Hertfordshire)
- Edward Lutman King. For services to the Cyclists' Touring Club. (Winterbourne, Bristol)
- Mrs Margot Kirk. For services to the Scottish Borders Athletics Club.
- Mrs Bertha Klug. For services to the Wessex Health Living Foundation and the Anne Frank Educational Trust UK. (London, NW3)
- Michael Robert Knowles. Constable, Greater Manchester Police. For services to the Police. (Manchester, Greater Manchester)
- Miss Debbie Knox. For services to Curling. (Lochgelly, Fife)
- Ismail Ahmed Lambat. For services to the community in Manchester. (Manchester, Greater Manchester)
- David Keith Lane. Postman. For services to Consignia and to the community in Herefordshire. (Bromyard, Herefordshire)
- Roy Lane. Member, Bridgnorth District Council. For services to Local Government and to the community. (Broseley, Shropshire)
- William Keith Laughlin. Veterinary Surgeon. For services to the Veterinary Profession. (Ballymoney, Antrim)
- John Scott Law. Leading Firefighter, Merseyside Fire Brigade. For services to the Fire Service. (Southport, Merseyside)
- Colin Charles Lawson. Retained Station Officer, Highland and Islands Fire Brigade. For services to the Fire Service. (Inverness, Inverness-shire)
- Mrs Hazel Brenda Layne. For services to the Girls Venture Corps in South Yorkshire. (Rotherham, South Yorkshire)
- Carl Anthony Lee. For services to the Society of Mary and Martha in Sheldon, Devon. (Exeter, Devon)
- Colin George Lee. For services to Dental Technology. (Leyland, Lancashire)
- Mrs Edna Margaret Lee. For services to the Citizens Advice Bureau in Leeds, West Yorkshire.
- Ian Maurice Lee. For services to Tourism. (Portstewart, Londonderry)
- Jason Leonard. For services to Rugby Union Football. (Twickenham, Middlesex)
- Richard Lethbridge. For services to Consignia and to the community in North Devon. (Umberleigh, Devon)
- George Richard John Lewis. For services to the community in Stafford during the Foot and Mouth Disease outbreak. (Stafford, Staffordshire)
- Hans Eugen Lichtenstein. For services to the community in Powys. (Llandrindod Wells, Powys)
- Mrs Anne Colette Marie Griffin Lismore. For services to the Simon Community. (Holywood, Down)
- Mrs Shirley Lea Livingstone. For services to War on Cancer. (Otley, West Yorkshire)
- Michael Conway Llewllyn. Curator, Battle of Britain Museum, Kent. For services to Heritage. (Nr Folkestone, Kent)
- Mrs Stephanie Marjorie Lloyd. Lately Corporate Services manager, HM Board of Inland Revenue. (Sutton Coldfield, West Midlands)
- Michael Christopher Lobb. Firearms Licensing manager, Thames Valley Police. For services to the Police. (Nr Towcester, Northamptonshire)
- Carl Frank Lomas. Managing director, Camelot Training Ltd. For services to Training in the Courier Industry. (London, EC1V)
- Mrs Gwendoline Marjorie Lowe. For services to the World Wide Fund for Nature in Bedfordshire. (Bedford, Bedfordshire)
- Ronald Ludford. Registration Officer, HM Land Registry, Lord Chancellor's Department. (Southsea, Hampshire)
- Mrs Fiona MacDonald. For services to Curling. (by Beauly, Inverness-shire)
- Mrs Joan Macfarlane. Health Visitor. For services to Homeless People in Sheffield. (Sheffield, South Yorkshire)
- Archibald Maclean. Lately Volunteer Leader, Craignure Volunteer Unit. For services to the Fire Service. (Isle of Mull, Western Isles)
- David Sutherland Millar Macleod. For services to the community, especially Elderly People, in Fife. (Cupar, Fife)
- John Alexander Macleod, DL. General Medical Practitioner, Lochmaddy, Western Isles. For services to Medicine. (Isle of North Uist, Western Isles)
- Norman Macleod. Station Honorary secretary, Oban Lifeboat, Argyll. For services to the RNLI. (Oban, Argyll and Bute)
- Miss Patricia Anne Macmaster. Chair Somerset Early Years Development and Childcare Partnership. For Services to Early Years Education.
- Peter Macpherson. For services to Natural History. (Glasgow)
- Mrs Doreen Edith Mahoney. Domestic Supervisor, University of Bristol. For services to Higher Education. (Hartcliffe, Bristol)
- Andrious Mama. For services to the Assyrian community and to Race Relations. (Erith, Kent)
- David Thomas Marchant. Manager, Machinery and Turf Maintenance, Wakehurst Place. For services to Horticulture. (Ardingly, West Sussex)
- Monte Marco. For services to the Children's Aid Committee, Glasgow. (Whitecraigs, Glasgow)
- Richard David Margesson, JP, DL. For services to the community in Swindon, Wiltshire. (Swindon, Wiltshire)
- Brian William Martin. Senior Master, Magdalen College School, Oxford. For services to English Language and Literature. (Oxford, Oxfordshire)
- David Martin. Architect. For services to Conservation of the Built Environment. (Walderslade, Kent)
- Dennis Stanford Martin. For services to the community in Penselwood, Somerset. (Wincanton, Somerset)
- Mrs Gloria Mary Martin. Number Two Regional Officer, Bakers Food and Allied Workers Union. For services to Trade Unionism. (Cardiff, South Glamorgan)
- Mrs Marie Martin. For services to Education. (London)
- Mrs Rhona Martin. For services to Curling. (Dunlop, Ayrshire and Arran)
- Theodore David Martin. Development Officer. For services to the Scottish Council for Voluntary Organisations. (Inverness, Inverness-shire)
- Miss Muriel Ilyn Mason. Lately Nursing Auxiliary, Elderly Care Rehabilitation Ward, Shrewsbury Hospital. For services to Health Care. (Shrewsbury, Shropshire)
- Mrs Dorothy Masterman. Probation Officer. For services to the Probation Service. (Leeds, West Yorkshire)
- David Benjamin Mathias. Pollution Prevention manager, Environment Agency. For services to the Environment during the Foot and Mouth Disease outbreak. (Caerphilly)
- Nicholas Richard Matthews. Grade B2, Prime Minister's Office. (London, E3)
- Mrs Lorna Faith Matyszak. For services to the community in Brighton, East Sussex. (Brighton, East Sussex)
- Mrs Joan Maunder. For services to the Fareham Victim Support Scheme, Hampshire. (Fareham, Hampshire)
- Mrs Betty Louisa McAulay. For services to the Air Training Corps in London and South East England. (Hornchurch, Essex)
- Mrs Rachel McCann. For services to the community in Easthall, Glasgow. (Easthall, Glasgow)
- Mrs Joyce McCarten. Member, Holmewood Estate Executive Committee. For services to the community in Bradford. (Bradford, West Yorkshire)
- John Derrick McClure. Senior Lecturer, Department of English, University of Aberdeen. For services to Scottish Culture. (Aberdeen)
- David Alexander McClurg. For services to the Police. (Belfast)
- John McComb. Driver, Mobile Library. For services to the Library Service in rural communities. (Ballymoney, Antrim)
- Mrs Doreen McCoy. Finance Officer, Eccles College, Manchester. For services to Further Education. (Wigan, Lancashire)
- Henry Desmond McCullough. For Public Service. (Comber, Down)
- Miss Margaret Elizabeth McCully. Personal assistant to the Principal, Central School of Speech and Drama, London. For services to Higher Education. (London, NW3)
- Mrs Nell McFadden. For services to Older People in Renfrewshire. (Gourock, Renfrewshire)
- Mrs Elizabeth Fulton McGowan. For services to the community in Wigtown and District. (Wigtown)
- Peter John McGowan, BEM. Lately Area manager. For services to the Peak District National Park. (Glossop, Derbyshire)
- Jacqueline Margaret McLoughlin. For services to Community Life in Sutton, Surrey.
- Miss Ruth Pamela McMullen. For services to Equestrian Training. (King's Lynn, Norfolk)
- Mrs Jeanette McNeice. For services to People with Learning Difficulties. (Belfast)
- Mrs Ruth Vera McVicker. For services to the Riding for the Disabled Association. (Belfast)
- Arthur William Mitchell. For services to the Natural Environment. (Kilkeel, Down)
- Mrs Mary Priscilla Mitchell. For services to the community in Totnes, Devon. (Totnes, Devon)
- Mrs Valerie Kay Moody. National Education Liaison Officer, Showmen's Guild of Great Britain. For services to the Education of Traveller Children. (Middlesbrough, North Yorkshire)
- Mrs Irene Elizabeth Moore. For charitable services, particularly to Velindre Hospital, in Cardiff. (Mountain Ash, Rhondda Cynon Taff)
- Mrs Lyn Desiree Moore. For services to the community in Bewdley, Worcestershire and Haslemere, Surrey. (Haslemere, Surrey)
- Mrs Theresa Kathleen Moore. For services to the Disability Times Trust. (London, SW1V)
- Mrs Kelly Ann Morgan. For services to the community, especially through Sport, in South Wales. (Pontyclun, Rhondda Cynon Taff)
- Keith Morris. For services to Medical Research. (Penicuik, Lothian)
- William Ian Morris. For services to the Fishing Industry. (Kilkeel, Down)
- Mrs Jeanie Simpson Morrison. Manager, Aberdeen and North East Energy Efficiency Advice Centre. For services to Energy Efficiency. (Alford by Aberdeen, Aberdeenshire)
- Martin Christopher Fortescue Mortimer. For services to Antique Glass. (Chippenham, Wiltshire)
- Mrs Jean Morton, JP. For services to the Administration of Justice and to the community in Kingston-upon-Hull, East Riding of Yorkshire.
- Miss Margaret Elizabeth Morton. For services to Curling. (Mauchline, Ayrshire and Arran)
- Miss Peggy Moss. For charitable services to St. Rocco's Hospice, Warrington, Cheshire. (Warrington, Cheshire)
- Mrs Mary Mostyn. For services to Ickburgh Special School, Hackney, London. (London, E5)
- Mrs Annette Mountford. For services to Family Links. (Oxford, Oxfordshire)
- Noel Mulholland. For Public Service. (Bangor, Down)
- The Rev Frederick Larmour Munce. For services to Community Relations. (Londonderry)
- Ms Helen Dempsie Munro. Director of Community Services, Stirling Council. For services to the community. (Stirling, Stirling and Falkirk)
- Alex Murray. Farmer. For services to Agriculture in Perthshire. (Aberfeldy, Perth and Kinross)
- Mrs Erica Dorcas Murray. Veterinary Surgeon. For services to Animal Health in Roxburghshire.
- Mrs Lesley Myles, JP, DL. For services to the community in Surrey. (Guildford, Surrey)
- Suleman Nagdi, JP. For services to the Muslim community in Leicester. (Leicester, Leicestershire)
- Mrs Elsie Naisbett. Tenants' Leader, Studley Estate, Stockwell, London. For services to Housing. (London, SW4)
- Mrs Catherine Neill. For services to Elderly People. (Belfast)
- Alexander Nelson. Senior Enrolled Nurse, State Hospital, Carstairs. For services to Mental Health Nursing. (Carnwath, Lanarkshire)
- Trevor Ricardo Nelson. Millennium Volunteers Ambassador. For services to Young People. (London, N10)
- John Newcombe. For services to Bowling for Visually Impaired People. (Birkenshaw, West Yorkshire)
- Edmund John Newton. Sound System manager, Palace of Westminster. For services to Parliament. (Croydon, Surrey)
- Gordon Leonard Newton. Foreman Gardener, University of Exeter. For services to Higher Education. (Exeter, Devon)
- William Paul Noble. For services to Disabled Swimming. (Glenrothes, Fife)
- Frank Harold Norman. For services to the Humberside Occupational Health and Safety Steering Group. (Hull, East Riding of Yorkshire)
- Leonard John Norman. Investigation Officer, Department of Trade and Industry. (St Leonards-on-Sea, East Sussex)
- Mrs Patricia Anne Norton. For services to the Administration of Justice. (Keighley, West Yorkshire)
- John Anthony O'Connor. For services to the Lewes Priory Cricket Club, Sussex. (Nr Lewes, East Sussex)
- Mrs Anne O'Hagan. For services to Education. (Ballymena, Antrim)
- John Daniel O'Hare. For services to Health and Safety in Agriculture. (Banbridge, Down)
- Thomas Anthony Oakes. For services to the Fire Service. (Downpatrick, Down)
- Colin Olden. Member, HM Coastguard Auxiliary Service in Hampshire. For services to Marine Safety. (Southampton, Hampshire)
- Derek Alan Owen. Dental Practitioner. For services to Dental Health in Shetland. (Lerwick, Shetland)
- Michael George Page. European Safety Co-ordinator, SONOCO. For services to Occupational Safety. (Cannock, Staffordshire)
- Carlyle Evan Palmer. For services to the Marie Curie Holme Tower Hospice in Penarth. (Cardiff, South Glamorgan)
- Mrs Dawn Violet Palmer. For services to Guiding in Ruislip, Middlesex. (Chalfont-St-Peter, Buckinghamshire)
- John Ashok Pandit. Chair, CM (Community Music Ltd) and ADFED Ltd. For services to the music industry.
- Dennis Arthur Parker, JP. For services to the St John Ambulance Brigade in Essex. (Grays, Essex)
- Liam Parker. For services to Unemployed and Disadvantaged People. (Belfast)
- Miss Alison Elizabeth Parkin. Personal secretary, Scottish Executive. (Edinburgh)
- Mrs Frances Parkinson. For charitable services through the National Bike Ride. (Woodbridge, Suffolk)
- Amrat Parmar. Director, Advanced Technologies, John Crane, Smiths Group plc. For services to the Defence Industry. (Bracknell, Berkshire)
- Stephen William Parr. Chief executive, Sabre Employment Ltd. For services to Disabled People. (London, SE12)
- Mrs Glenys Margaret Parry. For services to the community in Gwaenysgor, North Wales. (Rhyl, Denbighshire)
- Miss Sheila Margaret Parsonson. For services to the Colchester and District Cat Rescue and Rehoming Society. (Colchester, Essex)
- Mrs Lynne Emma Patterson. Administrative assistant, Dumfries and Galloway Council. For services during the Foot and Mouth Disease outbreak. (Dumfries)
- Jack Pavey. Head, International Relations Branch, Lord Chancellor's Department. (Marden, Kent)
- John Graham Maxwell Peddie. For services to the Pitstop Drop In Centre in Leatherhead, Surrey. (Leatherhead, Surrey)
- Mrs Margaret Kathleen Pegge. For services to the community, especially the League of Friends of Taunton Hospitals, in Somerset. (Taunton, Somerset)
- William Denby Peppiatt. For services to the community, especially Health Care, in Broadstairs and East Kent. (Broadstairs, Kent)
- Dindial Persaud. Supervising Gallery Guard, Victoria and Albert Museum. For services to Museums. (London, W4)
- Michael Arthur Peters. For services to the community in Horley, Surrey. (Horley, Surrey)
- Leslie Victor Albert Piercy. For services to the Sea Cadet Corps in London. (London, N1)
- William Arthur Plummer. For charitable services to the Leukaemia Research Fund. (Brentwood, Essex)
- Richard Basil Poad. For services to the Heritage of Maidenhead, Berkshire. (Cookham Dean, Berkshire)
- James Poole. Grade D, Defence Helicopter Flying School, Ministry of Defence. (Market Drayton, Shropshire)
- The Reverend David Potter. For services to People with Learning Disabilities in the United Kingdom. (Reading, Berkshire)
- Mrs Mavis Anne Pottinger. Health Care assistant. For services to Patient Care in Oxfordshire. (Oxford, Oxfordshire)
- Gerald Henry Poyner. Member, Hopton Wafers Parish Council, Worcestershire. For services to the community. (Cleobury Mortimore, Worcestershire)
- Peter Privilege. For services to Housing and to the community. (Belfast)
- John Maxwell Pryce. For services to Music Education. (New Barnet, Hertfordshire)
- Manpreet Singh Pujara. General Medical Practitioner. For services to Medicine. (Maidstone, Kent)
- Colin Pullan. For services to the Rehabilitation of Heart Disease Patients in Yorkshire. (Leeds, West Yorkshire)
- Robert Francis Purssell, JP. For services to the community in Plymouth, Devon, and Saltash, Cornwall. (Saltash, Cornwall)
- Michael Pybus. Administrative assistant, Department for Environment, Food and Rural Affairs. (Lincoln, Lincolnshire)
- David Francis Burton-Pye. For services to Conservation and Tourism in Staffordshire. (Perton, Staffordshire)
- Mrs Paula Jane Radcliffe. For services to Athletics. (Loughborough, Leicestershire)
- Mohammed Abdur Rahman. For services to Primary Care in Wolverhampton. (Wolverhamppton, West Midlands)
- Derek William Rangecroft. For charitable services to the Macmillan Cancer Relief Fund. (Dumfries)
- Mrs Janice Caroline Rankin. For services to Curling. (Culloden, Inverness-shire)
- Mrs Taifur Rashid. Chairperson, Tower Hamlets Race Equality Council. For services to Community Life in London. (Redbridge, Essex)
- Harmegh Singh Rattan. For services to Racial Equality in London. (Ilford, Essex)
- Miss Sylvia Joan Read (Mrs Fry). For services to Theatre Roundabout Ltd. (London, NW11)
- Keith Redwood. Chairman, Ross and Cromarty Drug and Alcohol Forum. For services to Tackling Drug and Alcohol Misuse. (Evanton, Ross and Cromarty)
- George Edward Reid. For services to the Colony Park Football Club, North East Scotland. (Inverurie, Aberdeenshire)
- William Nicol George Reid. Chairman, Boys' and Girls' Clubs of Scotland. For services to Young People. (Edinburgh)
- Mrs Rosemary June Renouf. For services to Mental Health Services and their Users in Nottingham. (Nottingham, Nottinghamshire)
- Mrs Margaret Reuben. Lately Lecturer, Falkirk College. For services to Further Education. (Paisley, Renfrewshire)
- Frank Abbott Reynolds. Farmer. For services to the community in Farnsfield, Nottinghamshire. (Newark, Nottinghamshire)
- Christopher Roberts. Care Worker, Isle of Anglesey County Council. For services to the community. (Anglesey, Gwynedd)
- Peter Holtom Roberts. For services to Compassion in World Farming. (Liss, Hampshire)
- David Dickson Robertson. For services to the community in Comrie, Perthshire. (Comrie, Perth and Kinross)
- James Alexander Robertson. For services to the community in Dundee. (Dundee)
- Mrs Jennifer Margaret Robertson. Teacher, Petteril Bank School, Cumbria. For services to Education. (Carlisle, Cumbria)
- Mrs Barbara Elizabeth Anne Robinson. Community Project manager, Blakeston Community School, Stockton-on-Tees. For services to Education. (Stockton-on-Tees, Durham)
- Alastair Rodgers. Director, Northern Offshore Federation. For services to the Oil and Gas Industry in the North of England. (Darlington, Durham)
- Patrick O'Ryan-Roeder. Field Editor, ITN. For services to Television Broadcasting.
- Mrs Marguerite Rollason. For services to the Molesey and Ditton Housework Scheme, Surrey. (Thames Ditton, Surrey)
- David William Rooke. For services to Flood Defence and to the Environment. (York, North Yorkshire)
- Mrs Alicia Graham Rootes. For services to the King George's Fund for Sailors in Perthshire. (Logiealmond, Perth and Kinross)
- Miss Esther Sandra Rorrison. Higher Executive Officer, Department for Environment, Food and Rural Affairs. (Kingston, Surrey)
- Ms Maggie Ross. For services to Training for Disadvantaged Groups. (Nottingham, Nottinghamshire)
- Peter David Royle. General manager, Enham Industries. For services to Disabled People. (Hungerford, Berkshire)
- Raman Ruparell. For services to Community Life and to Race Relations in London. (Ilford, Essex)
- Antony Russell. Senior Navigator. For services to the Port Health Authority, Corporation of London. (Bexleyheath, Kent)
- Peter Albert Russell. For services to the Jewish community in London. (London, NW4)
- Thomas Leslie Ryder. For services to the Co-operative Movement and to the community in North Wales. (Colwyn Bay, Conwy)
- Mrs Margaret Elizabeth Rylatt. Archaeologist. For services to Heritage in Coventry. (Coventry, Warwickshire)
- John Arthur Sadden. Head, Design Assurance and Product Safety, BAE Systems Marine Ltd. For services to the Defence and Shipbuilding Industries. (Helensburgh, Argyll and Bute)
- Mrs Lauraine Frederica Sadleir. Grade E2, Ministry of Defence. (St Austell, Cornwall)
- Arthur Sadler. President, Suffolk Valuation Tribunal. For services to modernising the Valuation Tribunal Service. (Ipswich, Suffolk)
- Mrs Joyce Sainsbury. For services to the community in Grimscott, Cornwall. (Nr Bude, Cornwall)
- Mrs Daisey Eileen Salmon. Pastoral Auxiliary, Metropolitan Police Service. For services to the Police. (London, SE3)
- Paul Richardson-Sandell. Industrial Technician, Devonport Management Ltd. For services to the Defence Industry. (Plymouth, Devon)
- Resham Singh Sandhu. Chairman, Leicester Council of Faiths. For services to Community Life. (Leicester, Leicestershire)
- William Liege Saul. For charitable services to the community in South Wales. (Port Talbot, Neath Port Talbot)
- Mrs Susan Savage. Council Tax Caseworker, HM Board of Inland Revenue. (Gosport, Hampshire)
- Mrs Kathleen Sayles. For services to the RAF Lichfield Association. (Doncaster, South Yorkshire)
- Peter Decoursey Irving Scantlebury. For services to Basketball. (Sheffield, South Yorkshire)
- Mrs Mora Joan Scott, DL. Honorary president, Children 1st in Moray. For services to Children.
- Riny Stanley Shadforth. Lately chief inspector, Warwickshire Constabulary. For services to the Police. (Rugby, Warwickshire)
- Kishore Devsi Shah. Environment Health and Safety manager, Terra Nitrogen UK Ltd. For services to Safety in the Fertiliser Industry. (Stockton-on-Tees, Durham)
- Mrs Lily Shaw. For services to the Holbrook CE Primary School, Derbyshire. (Belper, Derbyshire)
- Stephen Eric Shaw. Lately Coxswain, Alderney Lifeboat. For services to the RNLI. (Alderney, Channel Islands)
- Mrs Zella Shawyer. For services to MIND in Malvern, Worcestershire. (Malvern, Worcestershire)
- Eric Norman Horace Shearly. For services to the community, especially Queen Elizabeth's School, in Barnet, Hertfordshire. (Barnet, Hertfordshire)
- Mrs Lynne Sheasgreen. Assistant private secretary (diary) to the secretary of the Cabinet, Cabinet Office. (London, N16)
- Robert Shepherd. For services to Bagpipe Music and Teaching. (Lochgelly, Fife)
- Mrs Winifred Aitken Sherry, JP. Trustee, Lanarkshire Primary Care NHS Trust. For services to the NHS. (Motherwell, Lanarkshire)
- Kutubuddin Ahmed Shikder. For services to the Muslim communities in East London. (London, E1)
- Mrs Felicity Ann Sieghart. For services to the Film Industry in Aldeburgh, Suffolk. (Aldeburgh, Suffolk)
- Lt Frederick Thomas Sigley. R.N. For services to the Soldiers', Sailors' and Airmen's Families Association in Stoke-on-Trent, Staffordshire. (Stoke-on-Trent, Staffordshire)
- Mrs Rema Sim. Project Worker, Stonham Housing Association. For services to Homeless People in Calderdale. (Halifax, West Yorkshire)
- Miss Posy Simmonds. Illustrator and Cartoonist. For services to the Newspaper Industry. (London, WC1X)
- Thomas Walker Simpson. Lifeboatman. For services to the RNLI. (Donaghadee, Down)
- Mrs Jacqueline Sims. For services to the community in Wotton-under-Edge, Gloucestershire. (Wotton-under-Edge, Gloucestershire)
- Harjit Singh. General Medical Practitioner, Warwickshire. For services to Medicine. (Nuneaton, Warwickshire)
- Joseph Patrick Skehel. For services to Agriculture in Lincolnshire. (Lincoln, Lincolnshire)
- Mrs Susan Ruth Skelton. For services to the community in St. Austell, Cornwall. (St Austell, Cornwall)
- John Valentine Skene. For services to Industry through Quality Management. (Kingswood, Bristol)
- Mrs June Slatter. For services to the Maes y Neuadd Country House Hotel and to Tourism. (Talsarnau, Gwynedd)
- Victor Sloan. For services to Further Education. (Portadown, Armagh)
- William Slowther. Project manager, Endeavour Training, Birmingham. For services to Young People. (Birmingham, West Midlands)
- Mrs Gloria Kershaw-Smalley. Nursing Auxiliary, Blackburn Royal Infirmary. For services to Health Care. (Blackburn, Lancashire)
- Mrs Janet Elizabeth Smith. For services to the community in Hessle, East Riding of Yorkshire. (Hessle, East Riding of Yorkshire)
- Miss Kathleen Elizabeth Smith, JP. Honorary secretary, Workers' Educational Association. For services to Adult Education in Southampton, Hampshire and Southern District. (Southampton, Hampshire)
- Roger Gayford Smith. Chair, Suffolk Education Business Partnership. For services to Education and Business. (Ipswich, Suffolk)
- William James Smith. For services to Aikikai. (Dudley, West Midlands)
- Robert Snodden. For Public Service. (Belfast)
- Mervyn Allen Solomon, JP. For charitable services. (Belfast)
- Robin Spence. Farmer. For services to Agriculture and to the community in Dumfriesshire. (Lockerbie, Dumfries)
- Mrs Julie Spencer. Children's and Schools' Librarian, Bolton. For services to Librarianship. (Wigan, Lancashire)
- Mrs Patricia Margaret Spragg. Senior Personal secretary, HM Treasury. (London, E17)
- Eric Neil Sydney Spreadbury. For services to Local Government and to the community in Christchurch, Dorset. (Christchurch, Dorset)
- Christopher Charles Stamp. Special Constable, Metropolitan Police Special Constabulary. For services to the Police. (South Harrow, Middlesex)
- Richard Stanwell. Committee Services Administrator. For services to the Regulation of Nurses, Midwives and Health Visitors. (St Albans, Hertfordshire)
- Mrs Margaret Isobel Staples. Adoption Team manager, Nottinghamshire County Council. For services to Adoption. (Walesby, Nottinghamshire)
- Mrs Jocelyn Hilda Stephenson. For services to the community, especially the Citizens Advice Bureau, in Morpeth, Northumberland. (Morpeth, Northumberland)
- Mrs Anne Sterry. Nursery Nurse, Usk Primary School. For services to Children with Special Educational Needs. (Newport, Gwent)
- Miss Dorothy Stevens. For services to Dance in Halifax, West Yorkshire. (Halifax, West Yorkshire)
- Mrs Evelyn Anne Elizabeth Stevens. Senior Librarian, HM Treasury Solicitor's Department. (Ruislip, Middlesex)
- Mrs Margaret Stitt. Chief Usher, Furness Magistrates Court, Cumbria. For services to the Court Service. (Barrow-in-Furness, Cumbria)
- Miss Mary Catherine Stocks. Librarian, Crown Office and Procurator Fiscal Service, Scottish Executive. (Edinburgh)
- Miss Beryl Noreen Stonestreet. For services to the community, especially the Children's Society, in Kent. (Tunbridge Wells, Kent)
- The Reverend David John Stoter. For services to the Hospital Chaplaincy and Bereavement Service. (Nottingham, Nottinghamshire)
- Mrs Hilary Jayne Strong. Youth Worker in Charge, Bottesford Youth Centre, Scunthorpe, Lincolnshire. For services to Young People. (Scunthorpe, Lincolnshire)
- Jack MacFarlane Stuart. For services to the community in Coleshill, Warwickshire.
- Roger Alexander Stuart. For services to the Nuclear Industry and to the community in Caithness. (Thurso, Caithness)
- Mrs Mary Stubbington. Lately Grade E1, School of Employment Training, Ministry of Defence. (Eastleigh, Hampshire)
- Mrs Barbara Ann Summerfield, JP. For services to the community, especially Young People, in East Sussex. (Brighton, East Sussex)
- Stewart Alan Swales. Chief executive, Nottingham Regeneration Ltd. For services to the community. (Cotgrave, Nottinghamshire)
- Stephen Charles Sweetlove. Constable, Bedfordshire Police. For services to the Police. (Biggleswade, Bedfordshire)
- Gerald James Swires. Inspector of Taxes, HM Board of Inland Revenue. (Sale, Cheshire)
- Gary Stephen Tallant. Revenue Officer, HM Board of Inland Revenue. (Cleckheaton, West Yorkshire)
- Michael Tamsett. For services to the community in Detling, Kent. (Sittingbourne, Kent)
- Annette Worsley-Taylor. For services to London Fashion Week. (London, SW10)
- Mrs Doreen Taylor. For services to the Wigan and District Wheelchair Fund. (Wigan, Lancashire)
- Mrs Eileen Veronica Taylor. For services to the community in Fleet, Hampshire. (Fleet, Hampshire)
- Martin Taylor. Guitarist. For services to Jazz Music. (Near Maybole, Ayrshire and Arran)
- Mrs Mary Taylor. Headteacher, Ferguslie Primary School, Renfrewshire. For services to Education. (Bridge of Weir, Renfrewshire)
- Mrs Marjorie Thoburn. For services to Counselling. (Frodsham, Cheshire)
- Mrs Annette Thomas. For services to the community in Upper Chapel, Brecon. (Brecon, Powys)
- Arthur Charles Thomas. For services to the community in Telford, Shropshire. (Telford, Shropshire)
- Mrs Rosalind Mary Thomas. For services to Local Government and to the community in Powys. (Builth Wells, Powys)
- Edwin Thompson. For services to the community, especially Young People, in Drypool, Hull. (Hull, East Riding of Yorkshire)
- Archibald Muir Thomson. Chairman, Cordale Housing Association, Renton, Dunbartonshire. For services to the community. (Alexandria, Dunbartonshire)
- James Hood Thomson. Depot manager, Stagecoach Western. For services to Public Transport. (Stranraer, Wigtown)
- Miss Sara Jean Scott Thomson. Clerk in Charge, Serjeant at Arms Department, House of Commons. (London, SW3)
- Mrs Ena Cameron Threlfall. For services to the community, especially Pensioners House, in Hyde, Cheshire. (Hyde, Cheshire)
- Mrs Gillian Tipton. Home Carer, Social Services Department, Essex. For services to the community. (Colchester, Essex)
- Mrs Mary Travis. For services to the community in Cheddleton, Staffordshire. (Leek, Staffordshire)
- Mrs Heather Trelfer. Lately Acting Executive Officer, Home Office. (Dover, Kent)
- David Lawson Trudgill. Lately Nematologist, Scottish Crop Research Institute. For services to Plant Pathology. (By Blairgowrie, Perth and Kinross)
- Mrs Maureen Tucker. For services to the community in Waltham Forest, London. (London, E11)
- Stuart Frank Tully. Lately Coroner's Officer, Kent County Constabulary. For services to the Coroner's Office. (Maidstone, Kent)
- Miss Brenda Kathleen Tumber. Pre-School Adviser, Kent Local Education Authority. For services to Early Years and Special Needs Education. (Whitstable, Kent)
- John Charles Thain Tunley. For services to Music and to the community in Ebbw Vale, Blaenau, Gwent. (Ebbw Vale, Gwent)
- Mrs Julia Mary Twynam. For services to the Board of Visitors, HM Prison Bullingdon. (Faringdon, Oxfordshire)
- Barry Unwin. Curator, Logan Botanic Garden. For services to the Royal Botanic Garden, Edinburgh. (Stranraer, Wigtown)
- Miss Edith Newell Uprichard. For services to Health Care. (Lurgan, Armagh)
- Mrs Polly Vacher. For services to the Royal International Air Tattoo Flying Scholarships for the Disabled. (Abingdon, Oxfordshire)
- Mrs Debra Veal. For services to Trans-Atlantic Rowing. (Teddington, Middlesex)
- Mrs Kathryn Eleanor Vessey. Lately Personal assistant. For services to the Better Regulation Task Force. (Nr Hull, East Riding of Yorkshire)
- Ms Joanna Wade. Solicitor. For services to the Maternity Alliance. (Westerham, Kent)
- Thomas Luther Wakefield. Member, Harthill Parish Council, South Yorkshire. For services to the community. (Sheffield, South Yorkshire)
- Mrs Catherine Frances Walker. Honorary Curator, Hornsea Museum. For services to Heritage in East Riding of Yorkshire. (Hornsea, East Riding of Yorkshire)
- Eric Walker, DL. For services to the community, especially the Prospect Hospice, in Swindon, Wiltshire. (Swindon, Wiltshire)
- Raymond Walker. For services to the Royal Air Forces Association in Llanelli, South Wales. (Llanelli, Carmarthenshire)
- Mrs Ruth Walmsley. For services to the community in Surbiton, Surrey. (Surbiton, Surrey)
- Ms Caroline Ward. For services to the Association of Residential Care. (Ashbourne, Derbyshire)
- John Alfred Ward. For services to Highway Maintenance and Safety. (Doncaster, South Yorkshire)
- Mrs Kathleen Warren. Senior Executive Officer, Department for Work and Pensions. (Stoke-on-Trent, Staffordshire)
- John McQueen Watson. Sergeant, Tayside Police. For services to the Police. (Perth and Kinross)
- Mrs Margaret Mary Watson. For services to the League of Friends of Sandwell General Hospital. (Walsall, West Midlands)
- Edward Alexander Weir. Senior Environmental Test Engineer, Computer Devices Co. For services to the Defence Industry. (Hastings, East Sussex)
- David Wheeler. For services to Meteorology on Fair Isle, Shetland. (Fair Isle, Shetland)
- Miss Dorothy Mary Patricia White. For charitable services to the community in Liss, Hampshire. (Liss, Hampshire)
- Mrs Myrna Nita Whiteson. For services to the Teenage Cancer Trust. (London, N20)
- Mrs Joan Whittaker. For services to the Beechwood Cancer Care Centre in Stockport, Cheshire. (Stockport, Cheshire)
- William Henry Whittaker. General manager, Cefndy Enterprises. For services to Disabled People. (Kinmel Bay, Denbighshire)
- Erl Buckley Wilkie. Director, Velocity Conference. For services to the City of Glasgow Council. (Glasgow)
- Frederick Williams. For services to Disabled People through Jigsaw. (Belfast)
- Mrs Helena Williams. For services to Foster Care in Denbighshire. (Prestatyn, Denbighshire)
- James Henry John Williams. For services to the Brass Band Movement and to the Salvation Army. (Enfield, Middlesex)
- Mrs Jean Williams. Chair, St. Matthew's Tenants' Association, Leicester. For services to the community. (Leicester, Leicestershire)
- Jeffrey Ray Williams. School Sports Tournament Co-ordinator, Gwent Police. For services to Young People. (Cwmbran, Torfaen)
- John Vincent Williams. For services to Foster Care in Denbighshire. (Prestatyn, Denbighshire)
- Mrs Nenna Doreen Williams. For services to Young People in the Cynon Valley. (Aberdare, Rhondda Cynon Taff)
- Theodore Gethyn Williams. Chartered Surveyor. For services to the Landmark Trust. (Bath, Somerset)
- Mrs Michaela Willis. For services to the National Committee Relating to Organ Retention. (Braunton, Devon)
- Charles Smart Wilson. For services to Disabled Older People in Edinburgh. (Currie, Midlothian)
- Peter Winwright. Chief Draughtsman, Martin-Baker Aircraft Co. Ltd. For services to the Defence Industry. (Aylesbury, Buckinghamshire)
- Mrs Betty Wood. Clinical Nurse Specialist, Prince Charles Hospital, Merthyr Tydfil. For services to Specialist Respiratory Nursing. (Merthyr Tydfil)
- Mrs Christine Wood. President, National Federation of Builders Yorkshire Association. For services to the Construction Industry. (Harrogate, North Yorkshire)
- David John Wood. For services to the Arts in Dewsbury, West Yorkshire. (Dewsbury, West Yorkshire)
- Mrs Frances Ann Wood. For services to the Frinton and Walton Home Support Group Trust, Essex. (Frinton-on-Sea, Essex)
- Miss Jennifer Wood. Community Librarian in Charge, Honiton, Devon. For services to Librarianship. (Cullompton, Devon)
- Mrs Judith Eileen Wood. For services to the Arts in Dewsbury, West Yorkshire. (Dewsbury, West Yorkshire)
- Mrs Dorothy Jean Wormwell. For services to the community, especially Elderly People, in Bridlington, East Riding of Yorkshire.
- Mrs Juliet Wright. For services to the community in Stoke, Kent. (Nr Rochester, Kent)
- David Saint Yackiminie. For services to Overseas Students in Aberdeen. (Kinellar, Aberdeen)
- Mrs Margaret Anne Jane Yeomans. For services to the Arts. (Portaferry, Down)
- Stephen Barry Loy Yip. For services to Kids in Need and Distress. (Liverpool, Merseyside)
- Stephen York. Transport and Plant manager, Environment Agency. For services to the Environment. (Darlington, Durham)
- Raymond Thomas Henry Young. For services to the community in Withycombe, Somerset. (Nr Minehead, Somerset)

Diplomatic Service and Overseas

- John Barringer Abington. For services to agricultural research overseas.
- Melvin Bell, Technical Management Officer, British Consulate-General New York.
- Phillip William Brisley, Headmaster, International Community School, Amman.
- Jeremy Nigel St. John Burne. For services to the British motor industry in the USA.
- Brian Patrick Clarke. For public service, St. Helena.
- Andre Fernard Cochlin. For services to the British community, Rome.
- Edward Scott Crossett. For services to trade development in the waste management industry.
- Miss Carolyn Mary Davis, Management Accountant, British Council Headquarters.
- Miss Angela Bancroft Dean, Head, Lower School, Sir James Henderson British School, Milan.
- William Thomas Ernest Divall, Administration Assistant and Driver (locally engaged), British Consulate-General, Sydney.
- Jeremy Paul Eavis. For services to the prevention of armed conflicts.
- John Hartley Ebanks. For services to ex-servicemen in Jamaica.
- Mary Ruth, Mrs. Edwards, Second Secretary, Foreign and Commonwealth Office.
- Ronald Ernest Fable. For services to orphaned children in the Philippines.
- Shirley Ann, Mrs. Fable. For services to orphaned children in the Philippines.
- Basil Clifford Fisk. For services to the local and British community, Peru.
- Miss Claire Fletcher. For services to the local community, New York.
- Pamela Angelina, Mrs. Gareze, Head of Registry (locally engaged), H.M. Embassy Madrid.
- David Howard Gavan, Honorary British Consul, Bari, Italy.
- Miss Helen Elizabeth Patricia Hamilton Gilmer. For services to leprosy sufferers and the chronically sick in Rwanda and Uganda.
- Freddie Ross, Mrs. Hancock. For services to UK-US cultural understanding.
- Timothy John Hansford. For services to British commercial interests in Mozambique.
- Kathleen Anne, Mrs. Harding. For services to leprosy sufferers and their families in Zambia.
- Isabel Mary, Mrs. Hardman. For services to the British community, Paris.
- Graham Martin Hellier. For services to the community, El Salvador.
- Kingsley Samuel Howe. For public service, Montserrat.
- Miss Maureen Teresa Howley. For services to the Foreign and Commonwealth Office.
- Michael Dennis Hurst. For services to former prisoners of war and their relatives, Taiwan.
- Diana Southwood, Mrs. Kennedy. For services to the environment and UK-Mexico cultural understanding.
- Virginia Anne, Mrs. Kern. For services to exports to the Middle East.
- Mark Brian Kettle, Second Secretary (Consular), British High Commission, Islamabad.
- Salvia Marion, Mrs. Wood-Lamont. For services to the young and disabled in Romania.
- Miss Nicola Kate Lewis, Visits Officer (locally engaged), H.M. Embassy Washington.
- John Heron Lightfoot. For services to international trade.
- Mary Murray, Mrs. Metz. For services to Scottish- Texan cultural and business links.
- Miss Carol Ann Arnold Morris, Community Participation Advisor, British Council, Pakistan.
- Miss Rosemary Nalden, Founder of Buskaid. For services to musical teaching in Soweto, South Africa.
- Phyllis Mary, Mrs. Peters. For public service, St. Helena.
- Dr. Sui Yun Poon. For services to exports.
- Miss Mary Louise Redmond, Visits Officer (locally engaged), British Consulate-General New York.
- David John Robinson, Second Secretary, Foreign and Commonwealth Office.
- Miss Juanita Carmen Aureol Dawn Roushdy. For services to INVOLVE, the IMF’s volunteer community programme in the USA.
- Miss Dinah Kate Rowlands. For services to nursing and public health in war-torn countries.
- Marie Berthe, Mrs. B Salter, For services to British War Veterans in France.
- Dr. Christopher Peter Sladen. For services to British commercial interests overseas.
- Jacqueline Kay, Mrs. Smith. For services to the community, Cayman Islands.
- Thomas Neville Tatem. For services to the community, Bermuda.
- David Ronald Taylor. For services to British ex- servicemen in Tenerife.
- Dorothy Griselda, Mrs. El Tayib. For services to the community and UK-Sudanese relations.
- Stafford Waters, Senior Fiscal Liaison Officer, H.M. Embassy Brussels.
- John Welsh, lately Press and Information Officer (locally engaged), H.M. Embassy Bogota.
- The Reverend Patricia Wright. For services to HIV/ AIDS work and education in Swaziland.
