= Beere =

Beere is an English surname. Notable people with this name include:

- Ella Beere (born 1998), Australian canoeist
- Estelle Beere (1875–1959), New Zealand dancing teacher
- Jackie Beere, English educator
- Lucy Beere (born 1982), Guernsey international lawn and indoor bowler
- Mrs. Bernard Beere (1851–1915), English actress
- Richard Beere (before 1493–1524), English Benedictine abbot of Glastonbury,
- Thekla Beere (1902–1991), Irish civil servant
- Tom Beere (born 1995), English footballer

Other

- Beere baiting
- Beere Wala Jattan

== See also ==
- Beer (disambiguation)
- Bere (disambiguation)
