= Caroline Rush =

Chief Executive of the British Fashion Council

Caroline Rush CBE
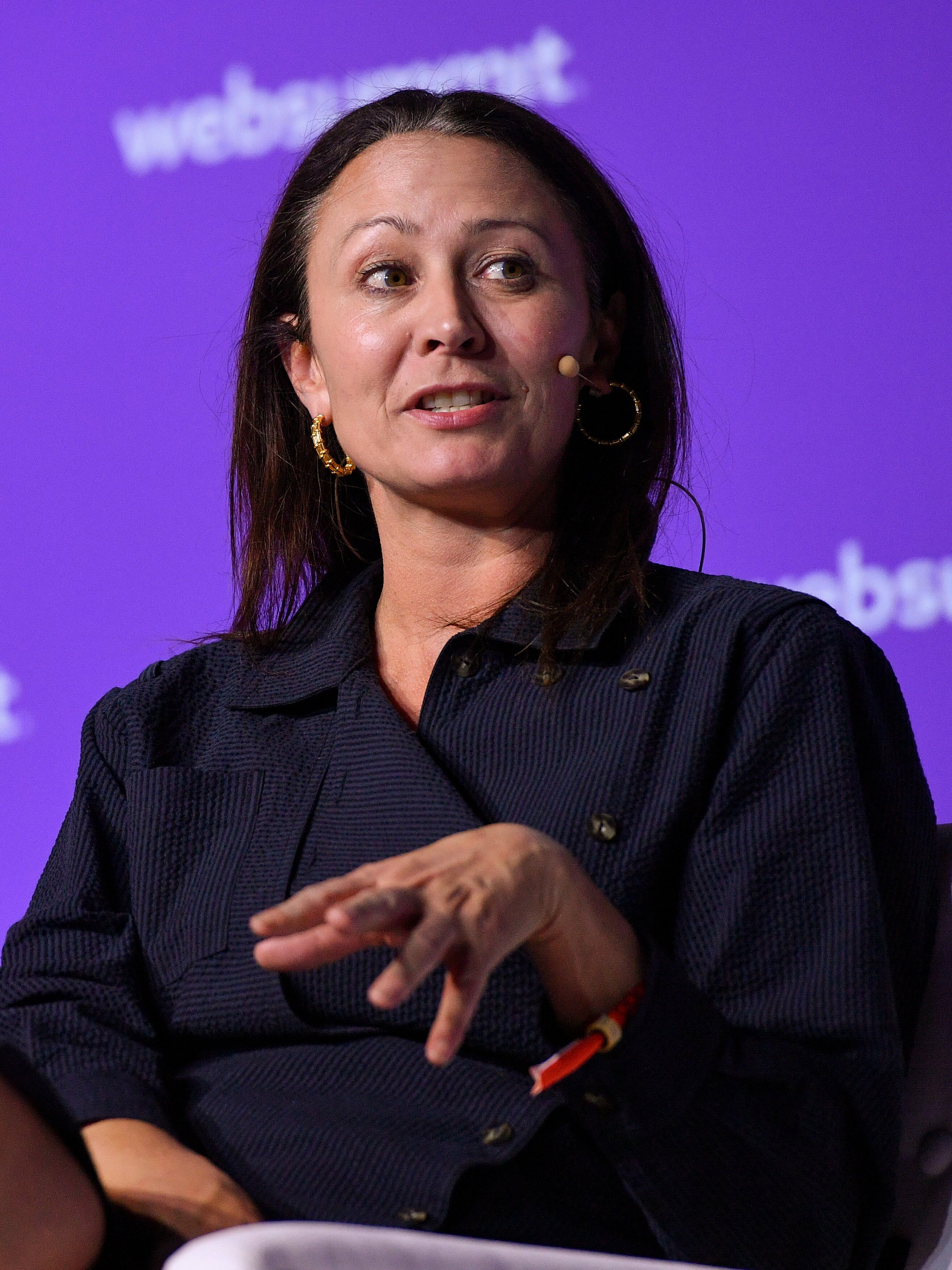
- Caroline Rush at Web Summit 2022
- Born: July 1971; Glasgow, Scotland
- Years active: 1992–present
- Spouse: Matthew Rush 1999-2022
- Children: 1

Caroline Rush CBE (née Larner; born July 1971) is a marketing professional who is Chief Executive of the British Fashion Council. Her role is to promote the British fashion industry, particularly through organising London Fashion Week and the British Fashion Awards.

== Early life and education ==
Caroline Larner was born in Glasgow, the middle of three daughters, and spent her early childhood in Bishopbriggs. Her father is an accountant and her mother is a teacher. Her father's job took the family to England, first to Derbyshire and then to Chorley, Lancashire.

== Career ==
Rush began working in public relations and marketing in about 1992. Her association with the British Fashion Council started in 1998, when she was employed by Annette Worsley-Taylor Associates, who were the creative and marketing consultants for the London Fashion Week. She started Manchester-based PR agency Crush Communications in 2002, and became managing director. The British Fashion Council appointed this company as the press office for all British Fashion Council initiatives, including the London Fashion Week and the British Fashion Awards, with Rush as a public relations strategy adviser to the British Fashion Council.

Rush was appointed British Fashion Council joint chief executive in March 2009. As joint Chief Executive, she oversaw the Council’s move into Somerset House in 2009. In a restructuring, Rush became sole chief executive in June 2012. Rush "played a key role in attracting brands such as Burberry and Pringle and British designers such as Antonio Berardi and Jonathan Saunders back to London." Hilary Alexander credited Rush with changing London Fashion Week from being a 'poor cousin' compared with Paris, Milan and New York, "and showing that Britain is really where it all begins".

Caroline is currently represented by talent & rights management agency Kruger Cowne.

== Personal life ==
Rush lives in London. Her ex-husband Matthew is a physical education teacher and former professional footballer for West Ham, Norwich and Oldham. Their daughter Lana competed in junior Wimbledon 2012 and 2013 and is now a marketing executive in fashion.

Rush was appointed Commander of the Order of the British Empire (CBE) in the 2015 New Year Honours for services to the British fashion industry.
