= Chris Pollock (microbiologist) =

British research scientist

Chris Pollock CBE FSB FLSW FIBiol

Director, Institute of Grassland and Environmental Research
- In office 1993–2007

Personal details
- Born: Christopher John Pollock; 28 March 1947 (age 79) Handsworth, Birmingham, England

Christopher John Pollock (born 28 March 1947) is a British research scientist.

Chris Pollock was born in 1947 in Handsworth, Birmingham. He studied at Trinity Hall, Cambridge. Pollock graduated from Birmingham University with a PhD degree in microbiology in 1971, and with a DSc degree in 1993 for a thesis on ‘Temperature, growth and carbohydrate metabolism in plants’.

In 2003 Pollock was appointed Chairman of the Advisory Committee on Releases to the Environment (ACRE), the United Kingdom government's main advisory committee on risks to human health and the environment from the release and marketing of GM crops and other genetically modified organisms. Pollock was Chief Scientific Adviser to the First Minister of the Welsh Assembly Government from 2007 to 2008. Pollock is Independent Co-Chair of the Science Advisory Council for Wales. Pollock was Director of the Institute of Grassland and Environmental Research in Aberystwyth from 1993 to 2007.

Pollock resigned from the Welsh Government’s Bovine TB Eradication Programme Board in 2012, over the Welsh government's reversal of a planned badger cull. In 2012 at the Farmers' Union of Wales’ annual conference held at Aberystwyth Pollock stated, regarding the Welsh Government's bovine TB policy, that in areas of high disease incidence vaccination would not prevent infected badgers from infecting cattle. Pollock also stated, at the Farmers’ Union of Wales’ annual conference held at Aberystwyth in 2012, that there was no scientific evidence that GM crop technology was inherently unsafe and that GM crops had a twenty-year history of safe use worldwide.

Chris Pollock was chairman of the independent Scientific Steering Committee for the programme of farm-scale evaluations of GM crops. He was chairman of the Research Priorities Group for Sustainable Farming and Food. He was chairman of Biotechnology and Biological Sciences Research Council’s Plants and Microbial Sciences Committee and Review Group on Sustainable Agriculture and Land Use. He is an Honorary Professor at Aberystwyth University and the University of Nottingham.

Pollock was appointed a Commander of the Order of the British Empire (CBE) in the 2002 Birthday Honours, for services to the environment. He is a Fellow of the Royal Agricultural Societies (FRAgS) and a Fellow of the Institute of Biology. Pollock is a former winner of the British Grassland Society Award. He was awarded the honorary degree of DUniv by Birmingham University in 2011. In 2014, Pollock was elected a Fellow of the Learned Society of Wales.
