= David Will =

Scottish footballer

David Houston Will CBE (20 November 1936 – 25 September 2009) was a Scottish association football administrator who held a number of prominent positions.

A solicitor by profession, Will was chairman of Brechin City for two decades, before becoming president of the Scottish Football Association (the governing body of Scottish football) and a vice-president of FIFA (the governing body of world football).

He was appointed a Commander of the Order of the British Empire (CBE) in the 2002 Birthday Honours for services to association football.

Will died of cancer in September 2009 at the age of 72.
