= June Thoburn =

June Thoburn CBE FRSA (born 17 May 1939) is an Emeritus Professor in the School of Social Work at the University of East Anglia.

She was educated at Balshaws Grammar School the University of Reading (BA, French), the University of Oxford, and the University of East Anglia (MSW, 1988). She qualified as a Social Worker in 1963 and joined the University of East Anglia as a Lecturer in Social Work in 1979.

She was made a CBE in the 2002 Birthday Honours, and is a Fellow of the Royal Society of Arts.
