= Annette Worsley-Taylor =

Annette Worsley-Taylor MBE (2 July 1944 – 24 August 2015) was a British fashion entrepreneur and the founder of London Fashion Week.

She was born on 2 July 1944, the only child of Sir John Godfrey Worsley-Taylor, 3rd Baronet. She was educated at Downe House School.

In 1975, she founded The London Designer Collections to promote young and emerging British fashion designers.

In the 2002 Birthday Honours, she received an MBE "for services to London Fashion Week".

She died on 24 August 2015.
