= Anne Harper Anderson =

Former Vice Principal University of Glasgow, specialising in communications

Anne Harper Anderson OBE FRSE
- Occupation: Social Science academic leader
- Organization: UNESCO UK National Commission Board of Directors
- Known for: research on communications including machine-human

Anne Harper Anderson OBE FRSE former University of Glasgow Vice Principal and Head of the College of Social Sciences, and Gender Champion, specialising in communications including machine-human interaction. She served (2008 - 2015) on the Engineering and Physical Sciences Research Council (EPSRC) which allocated £800million per annum for research. She was awarded an Order of the British Empire for services to social science (2002) and elected as a Fellow of the Royal Society of Edinburgh (2015).

== Education and early career ==
Anderson completed her MA and PhD in Psychology at the University of Glasgow, with her thesis, in 1982 on 'Text comprehension: The influence of temporal information on processing and reading rate'.

Her first role was as a Research Fellow (Linguistics) at the University of Edinburgh before returning to her alma mater as lecturer (1986) and professor (1997). She was a Research Programme Director for the Economic and Social Research Council (1995 -2006).

== Academic leadership roles ==
She became Director of the Graduate School and Associate Dean of Graduate Studies at Glasgow (2000). In 2005, she was appointed Chair in the School of Business and Management and Deputy Dean Research in the Faculty of Law, Business and Social Sciences.

The following year she took up a post at Dundee University as Professor of Human Computer Interaction and Vice-Principal and Head of the College of Art & Design, Architecture, Engineering and Physical Sciences. In 2010, she returned to Glasgow as the first Vice-Principal and Head of the College of Social Sciences, which had more than 8000 students and 500 staff. She took on the role of Gender Champion for the University in 2013.

== Selected publications ==
Selected by the University of Glasgow:

- Anderson, A., McEwan, R., Bal, J. and Carletta, J. (2007) 'Virtual team meetings: An analysis of communication and context.' Computers in Human Behavior, 23, pp. 2558–2580.
- Bard, E., Anderson, A., Chen, Y., Nicholson, H., Havard, C. and Dalzel-Job, S. (2007) 'Let's you do that: Sharing the cognitive burdens of dialogue.' Journal of Memory and Language, 57, pp. 616–641.
- Bergin, D., Anderson, A., Molnar, T., Baumgartner, R., Mitchell, S., Korper, S., Curley, A. and Rottmann, J. (2007) 'Providing remote accessible field trips (RAFT): an evaluation study.' Computers in Human Behavior, 23, pp. 192–219.
- Howarth, B. and Anderson, A. (2007) Introducing objects in spoken dialogue: 'The influence of conversational setting and cognitive load on the articulation and use of referring expressions'. Language and Cognitive Processes, 22, pp. 272–296.
- Anderson, A. (2006) 'Achieving understanding in face-to-face and video-mediated multiparty interactions.' Discourse Processes, 41, pp. 251–287.
- Sanford, A., Anderson, A.H. and Mullin, J. (2004) 'Audio channel constraints in video-mediated communication.' Interacting with Computers, 16, pp. 1069–1094.
- Anderson, A. (2003) 'Adapting communicative strategies to computer-mediated communication: An analysis of task performance and dialogue structure.' Applied Cognitive Psychology, 17(3), pp. 325–348.
- Doran, J. and Anderson, A. (2003) 'Inferencing skills of adolescent readers who are hearing impaired.' Journal of Research in Reading, 26, pp. 256–266.
- France, E.F., Anderson, A.H. and Gardner, M. (2001) 'The impact of status and audio conferencing technology on business meetings.' International Journal of Human-Computer Studies, 54, pp. 857–876.

In 2001, she also co-authored a book section (pp367–382) on 'Eye-tracking explorations in multimedia communications'

Her full publications list (67 articles) is available on researchgate.

== Current roles ==
A Vice Principal Emerita of the University of Glasgow, Anderson is on the Board of Directors of the UK National Commission for UNESCO and she also serves as deputy chair of the Commonwealth Scholarship Commission. She is on the board of Visit Scotland and is a member of the Scottish Funding Council Research and Knowledge Exchange committee. Anderson advises the British Council (Scotland) and The Robertson Trust and is a Fellow of the Royal Society of Edinburgh.
