= John Ashford =

British theatre director (1944–2023)

John Ashford CBE (6 July 1944 – 17 December 2023) was a British contemporary dance producer who was Director of Aerowaves, the European network for research and presentation of emerging dance companies, which he founded in 1997.

John Ashford was the first theatre editor at Time Out. He subsequently became Manager of the Theatre Upstairs at the Royal Court Theatre, at a time when it was producing the early plays of Sam Shepard and Caryl Churchill, and Richard O'Brien's Rocky Horror Show. He was then appointed Director of the Theatre at the ICA, promoting seasons of experimental theatre, performance work and new rock bands. In 1985, he brought the Canadian dance company La La La Human Steps to London.

As Theatre Director of The Place in London from 1986 to 2009, Ashford was instrumental in the growth of contemporary dance's popularity in the UK. He established the theatre as Britain's busiest dance venue, promoting the early works of companies including DV8, Adventures in Motion Pictures, V-tol Dance Company and Wayne McGregor Random Dance, and presenting the first UK performances from international artists such as Wim Vandekeybus, Sasha Waltz and Rui Horta. In 2004, he created The Place Prize, a biennial choreography competition, which is the richest and most prestigious in UK dance.

In 2002, Ashford was appointed a CBE for services to dance. He died from prostate cancer on 17 December 2023, at the age of 79.
