= Desmond Bowen =

British public servant

Desmond John Bowen (born 11 January 1949) is a British public servant, notable for serving as Director-General of Operational Policy in the Ministry of Defence during the build-up to the Iraq War.

== Biography ==
Bowen served as an officer in the Parachute Regiment in Northern Ireland, Cyprus and West Germany. He served as Director-General of Operational Policy in the Ministry of Defence. He served as a witness in the Iraq Inquiry. In 2017, he was appointed as a board member at the Imperial War Museum. He is an Associate Fellow at the International Institute for Strategic Studies.

Bowen is married and has two children.
