= Defence Bills Agency =

Former executive agency in the UK

The Defence Bills Agency was an executive agency of the United Kingdom Ministry of Defence (MoD) which paid the bills from MOD contracts, invoices and collects MOD receipts and provides financial management information to budget holders. It was responsible to the Minister for Defence Procurement.

Its chief executive was Norman Swanney. It was merged into the Financial Management Shared Service Centre (FMSSC).

== See also ==
Departments of the United Kingdom Government
