= Jackie Beere =

English educator

Jacqueline Ann Beere OBE is an English educator. From 2003 to 2006 she was Headteacher at Campion School in Bugbrooke, Northamptonshire.

== Qualifications ==
Jackie Beere became an Advanced Skills Teacher in 1999. She is also a qualified Master Neurolinguistic Programmer, an AST and Excellent Teacher accredited assessor and was an Associate Tutor for the University of Leicester for the MBA course.

== Honoured ==
In 2002 Beere received an OBE for services to education for her work in developing Learning to Learn initiatives and for leading national training for ASTs.

== Headteacher ==
Beere became Headteacher of Campion School in 2003. This large comprehensive school achieved a very good OFSTED report under her leadership in 2004. It was described as "very effective with excellent features. The dynamic focus by the Headteacher ...on improving learning is proving very effective in raising standards and has achieved local and national recognition".

Beere continued to develop curriculum innovations at the school, including introducing the RSA Opening Minds competency-based curriculum.

== Writings ==
Beere has written several publications linked to transforming learning and has written a book aimed at helping students learn how to learn. She has written several books for teachers including The Perfect Lesson, The Perfect Teacher and The Perfect Teacher Coach as well as editing the Crown House Perfect series of books aimed at supporting teachers to deliver outstanding learning in classrooms. Her latest book The growth mindset edge: your guide to developing grit was published in 2016.
