= Mike Stone (British Army officer) =

Brigadier Michael J Stone
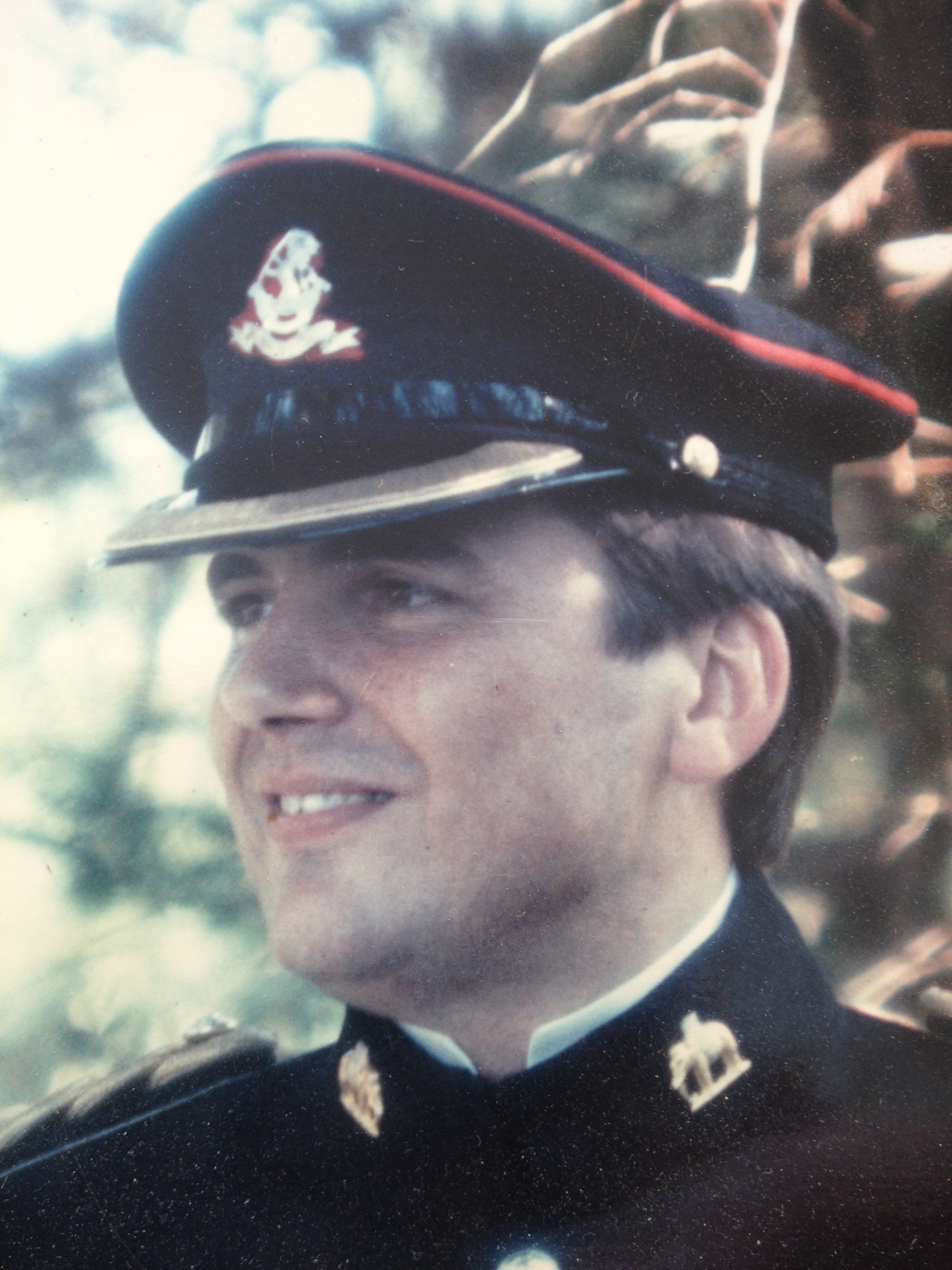
- Brigadier Michael J Stone as a Major
- Born: Burton-upon-Trent
- Military career
- Allegiance: United Kingdom
- Branch: British Army
- Service years: 1976–2002
- Rank: Brigadier
- Other work: Global Head of Government Technology Transformation at KPMG; Chief Information Officer of the Ministry of Defence; CEO of Defence Business Services; CEO of BT International; COO of BT Global Services; Global Chair of National Security and Defence at KPMG; Global MD of Public Sector, Healthcare and Life Sciences at IBM

Michael John Stone is a retired British Army officer and technology executive. He was chief digital and information officer of the Ministry of Defence (MoD) from May 2014 until March 2017.

== Business career ==
Stone joined BT Group after leaving the army. He became chief operating officer of BT International in 2005 and later president of service design and chief information officer of BT Global Services.

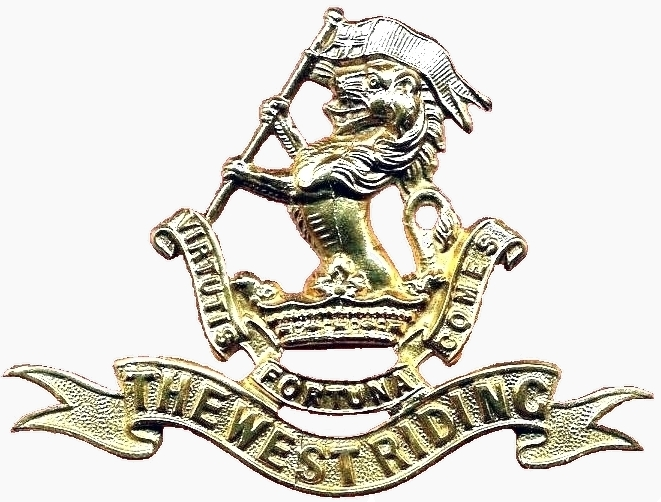
Stone's regiment cap badge

== Defence Business Services ==
In 2012 Stone led Serco's bid for the £36 million Defence Business Services (DBS) contract, which the MoD was outsourcing. The bid succeeded in March 2012 and Stone became chief executive of DBS. From 1 April 2014 the Service Personnel and Veterans Agency merged into DBS, which became responsible for administering the armed forces pension and compensation schemes, including the War Pension Scheme.

== Ministry of Defence CIO ==
On 2 May 2014 it was announced that Stone would succeed Yvonne Ferguson as the MoD's chief information officer. Questions were raised about potential conflicts of interest in the appointment; the MoD said his employment was covered by clear conflict-of-interest provisions.

Stone led the Information Systems and Services organisation within Joint Forces Command (later renamed Strategic Command).
