= SPVA =

SPVA may refer to:

- Service Personnel and Veterans Agency, an executive agency of the UK Ministry of Defence
- Singapore Phonogram Videogram Association, former name of Recording Industry Association Singapore
- S-PVA, super patterned vertical alignment, a type of thin-film-transistor liquid-crystal display
- Secure POS Vendor Alliance, a nonprofit organization
