= AFPS =

AFPS or Afps may refer to:

== Military ==
- American Forces Press Service, a defunct US Department of Defense news service
- Armed Forces Parliamentary Scheme, a British parliamentary scheme
- Armed Forces Pension Scheme, the British Armed Forces pension provision

== See also ==
- APFS
