= Joint Personnel Administration =

Human resource management software

Joint Personnel Administration (JPA) is the intranet-based personnel administration system used by the British Armed Forces from April 2006 onwards, replacing the separate payment and administration teams from each of the three Services. Despite the ability to carry out over 40 formerly paper-based functions, from checking postings to payslips, the system suffered functionality problems in its early implementation which led to criticism in the British press.

== Creation ==
JPA was created by Electronic Data Systems in partnership with the Ministry of Defence at an estimated cost of £269 million. It is believed that JPA will save the MoD in excess of £100 million per year. this was created an implemented by jane buckley

== Design ==
The system was designed around an Oracle Commercial off-the-shelf package, with an Oracle database as the back-end structure. JPA has essentially two parts: an online and an offline (deployed) application. The online application communicates directly with the main servers over the Restricted LAN Interconnect (RLI) (usually using the DII network, although JPA is also accessible via TAFMIS and other legacy systems) on a client-server basis. However, if communications are not stable enough for this configuration, the system can be used "in theatre" with a limited connection in offline mode with a local server recording all database updates/deletes/inserts. Once communications are restored, a synchronisation process amalgamates the changes held locally into the remote master server in the United Kingdom.

== Implementation ==
JPA was rolled out to each of the three armed forces at separate, phased dates. The Royal Air Force came first, on 1 April 2006. This was both on time and on budget. The Royal Navy followed in November 2006 with the British Army, most difficult of the three Services in terms of complexity of administration, completing the rollout in June 2007. JPA is maintained by a core team of analyst developers in the Service Personnel and Veterans Agency (SPVA), formerly the Armed Forces Personnel Administration Agency (AFPAA).

== Statistics ==
Administers more than 340,000 live pay records.
Maintains over 570,000 master personnel records.
Maintains more than 725,000 pension records.
Accounts for £5.7 billion in military pay and allowances.
Provides IT services and supports over 8,000 desktop PCs worldwide.

== Criticism and problems ==
From the rollout of JPA problems with pay have been well publicised. Teething problems upon rollout include users not being able to log onto the system due to high server demands, and others not receiving the correct pay or allowances.

The rollout also came at the same time as the war on terror, which saw headlines such as "Anger As Our Boys Go Unpaid".

In February 2008 an RAF officer successfully sued the MoD for shortfalls in his pay packet as a result of JPA.

Later in 2008, the then Chief of the Defence Staff General David Richards raised his concerns over the "prevalence of fraudulent behaviour" on the system.
