= Samuel Alcock =

Pottery manufacturer

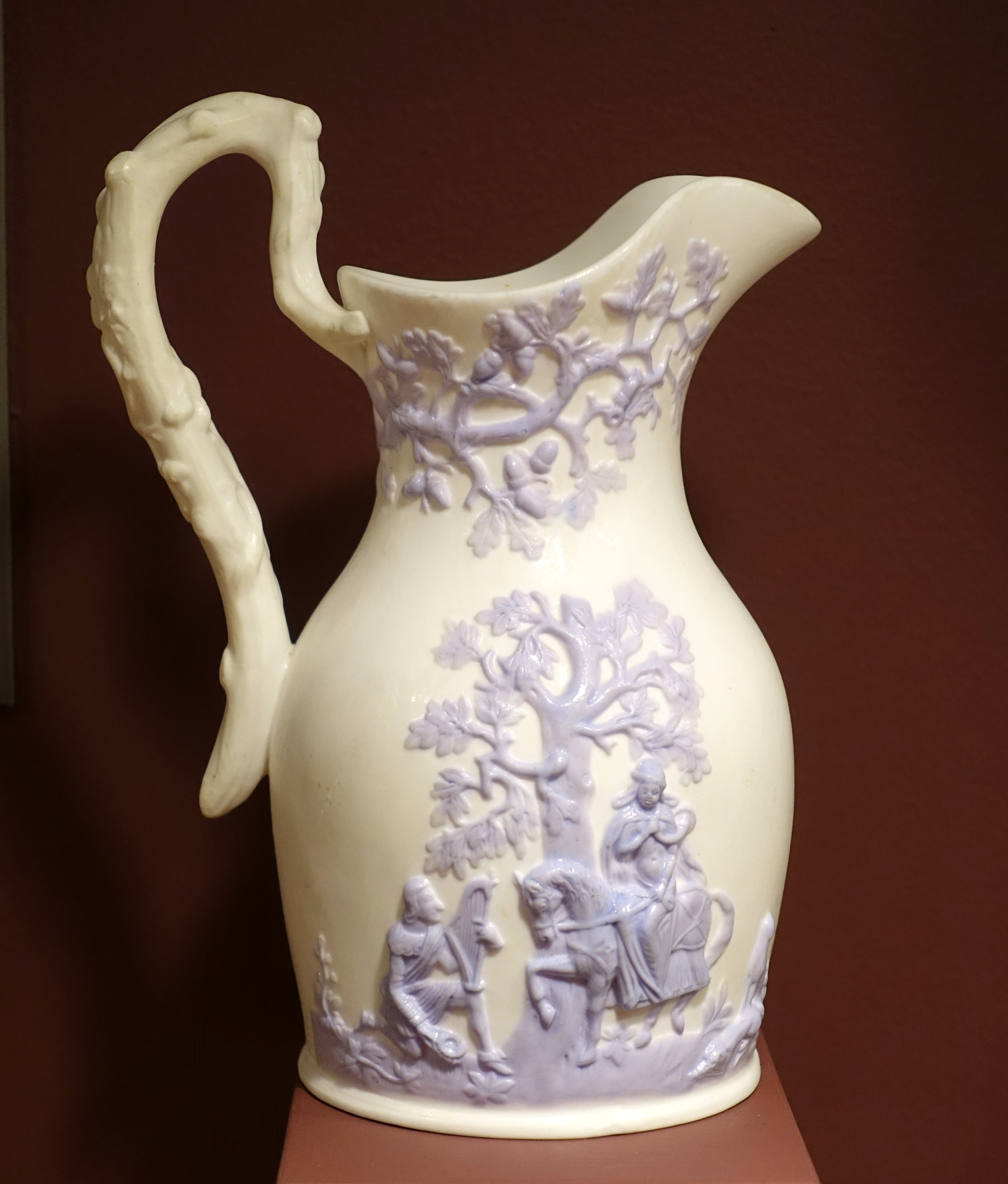
Love and War jug, Samuel Alcock & Co., c. 1850

Samuel Alcock (1799–1848) was an English pottery manufacturer who operated as Samuel Alcock & Co in Burslem, Staffordshire from 1828 to 1859. They were especially noted for "picture jugs" modelled and moulded in relief in various ceramic materials, a popular type of object in these years.

== Samuel Alcock & Co. ==
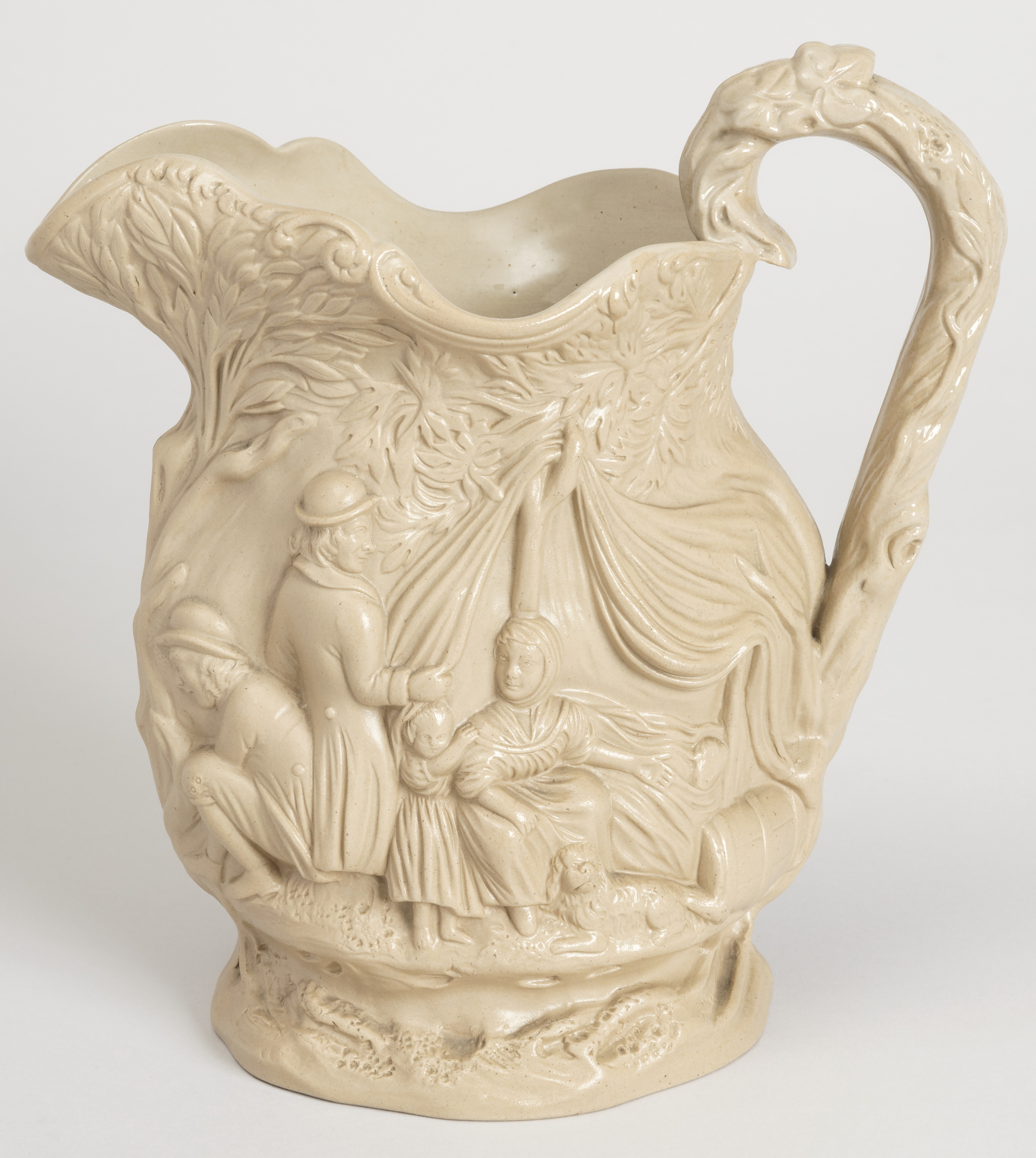
"Gypsy" jug, 1843, in glazed stoneware

Alcock was born in Kingsley, Staffordshire. He was the youngest of the nine children of Thomas (1746–1816) and Catherine Alcock (1756–1838). Though from a farming background, he developed an interest in commerce after working with his uncle Joseph Locker, a grocer, tea dealer, provision dealer, chandler and banker of the Market Square, Hanley. His introduction to pottery came when he embarked upon a partnership with Ralph Stevenson of Cobridge, Staffordshire.

In 1828, Alcock developed his own business and began work on the Hill Top site in Cobridge. By the 1830s Stevenson employed 600 people at his works. In 1839 he completed work on a large factory, built in the Venetian style, on the junction of Westport Road and Greenhead Street. In November of that year a party to celebrate the opening was held at the George Hotel and on 10 June 1840 a Grand Ball was hosted by the firm. Over two hundred guests attended and they danced to the Duke of Sutherland's Quadrille Band. The novelist Arnold Bennett called these works "Sytch Pottery" in his book Clayhanger.

Samuel died on 10 November 1848. The firm was then run by his wife Elizabeth and two of his sons, Samuel and Thomas, employing up to 700 people until closure due to bankruptcy in 1859. He had eleven children in total.

The firm used marks, but when it closed the models and moulds were dispersed to numerous buyers, and later versions from these were often unmarked. The Metropolitan Museum of Art in New York has a group of designs in watercolour.

== Public life ==
With three nephews, he began a bank in Burslem. In 1836, Alcock was appointed improvement commissioner for Burslem and on 9 June 1842 was elected chief constable for the town. In this post he took an important part in quelling the Chartist Riots, even though he was accused of selling his wares cheaply on account of the low wages he paid his workers.

The town of Burslem was fortunately prepared for a proper reception of the Banditti. A small troop of the 2nd Dragoon Guards had arrived there from Newcastle, under the command of Major Trench, and a large body of volunteers, from among the friends of law and social order of all classes of society, had been hastily organized as special constables, by the praiseworthy exertions of Samuel Alcock, Esq., the chief constable of Burslem.

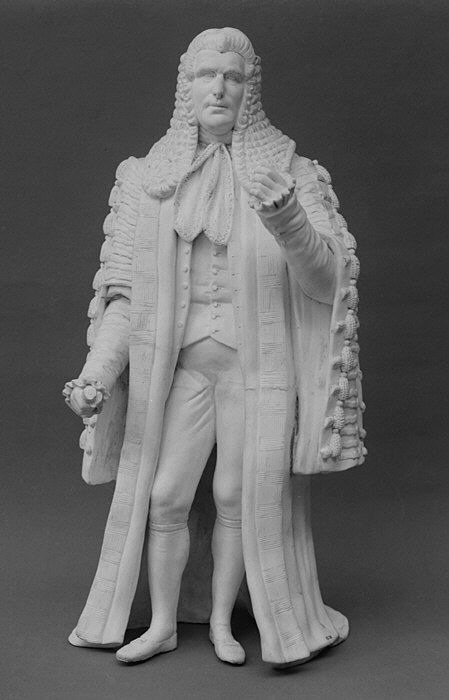
Parian ware figure of Lord Lyndhurst, 1829–30

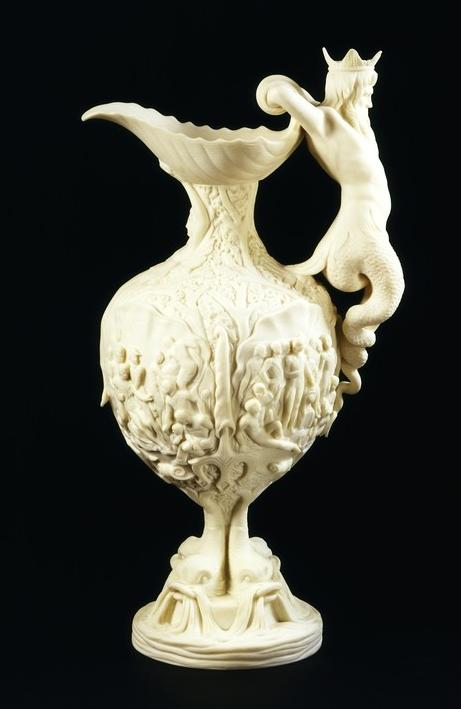
The Nelson Jug, 1851, V&A Museum, with designs adapted from the base of Nelson's Column

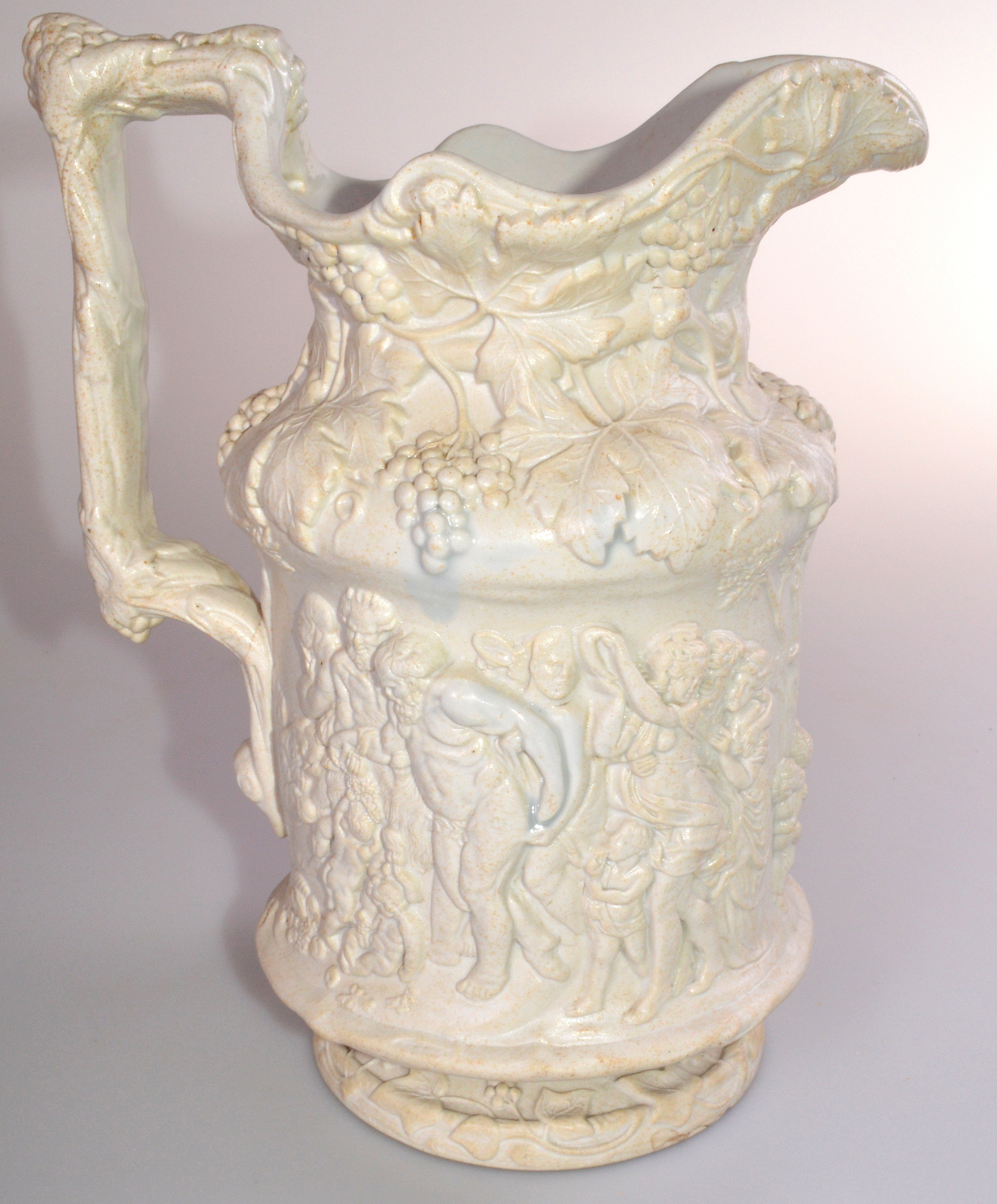
"Dionysus Pitcher", apparently belonging to the Saint-Louis fur-trader Gabriel Chouteau from new.

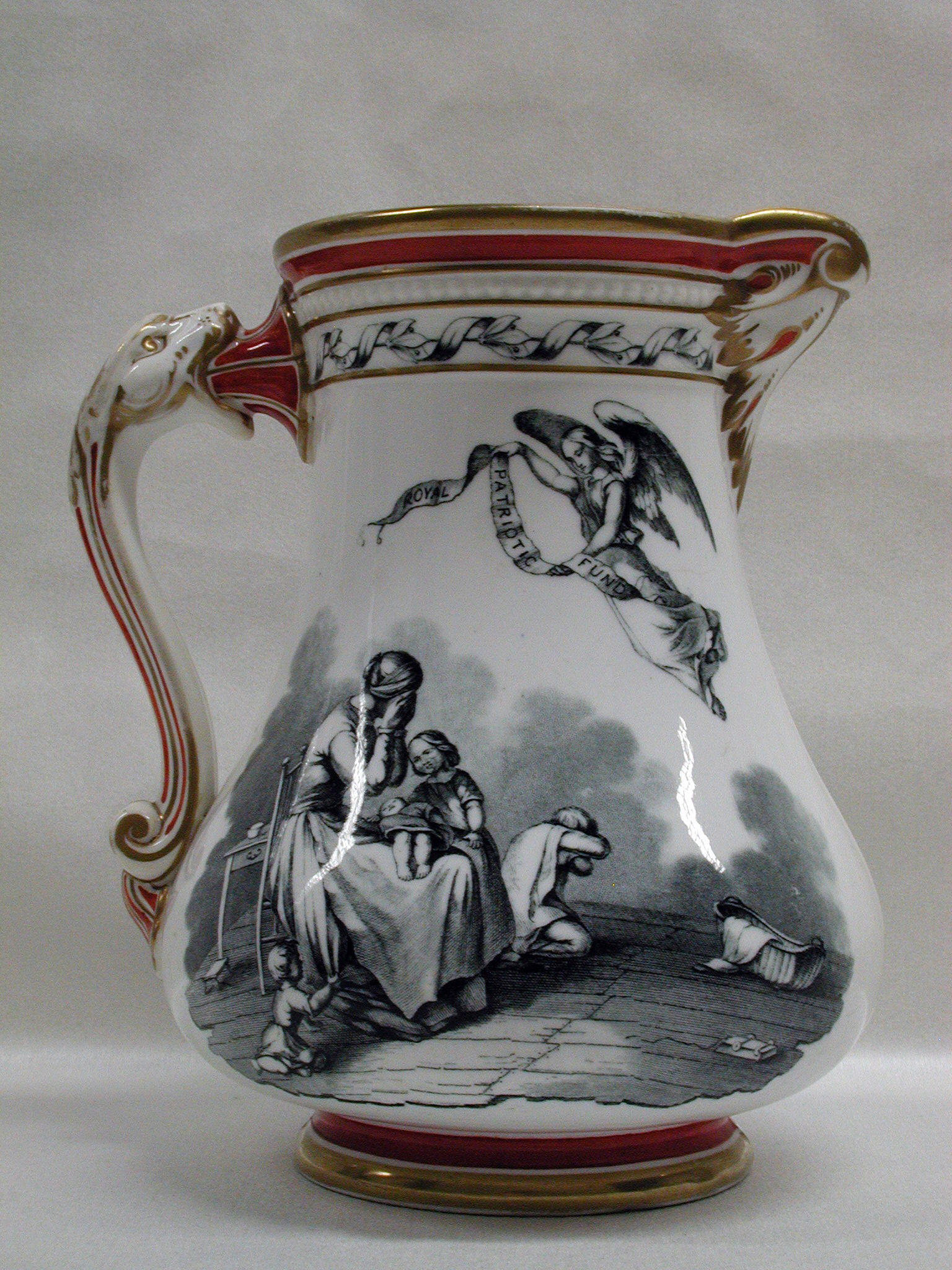
Jug for the Royal Patriotic Fund, 1855

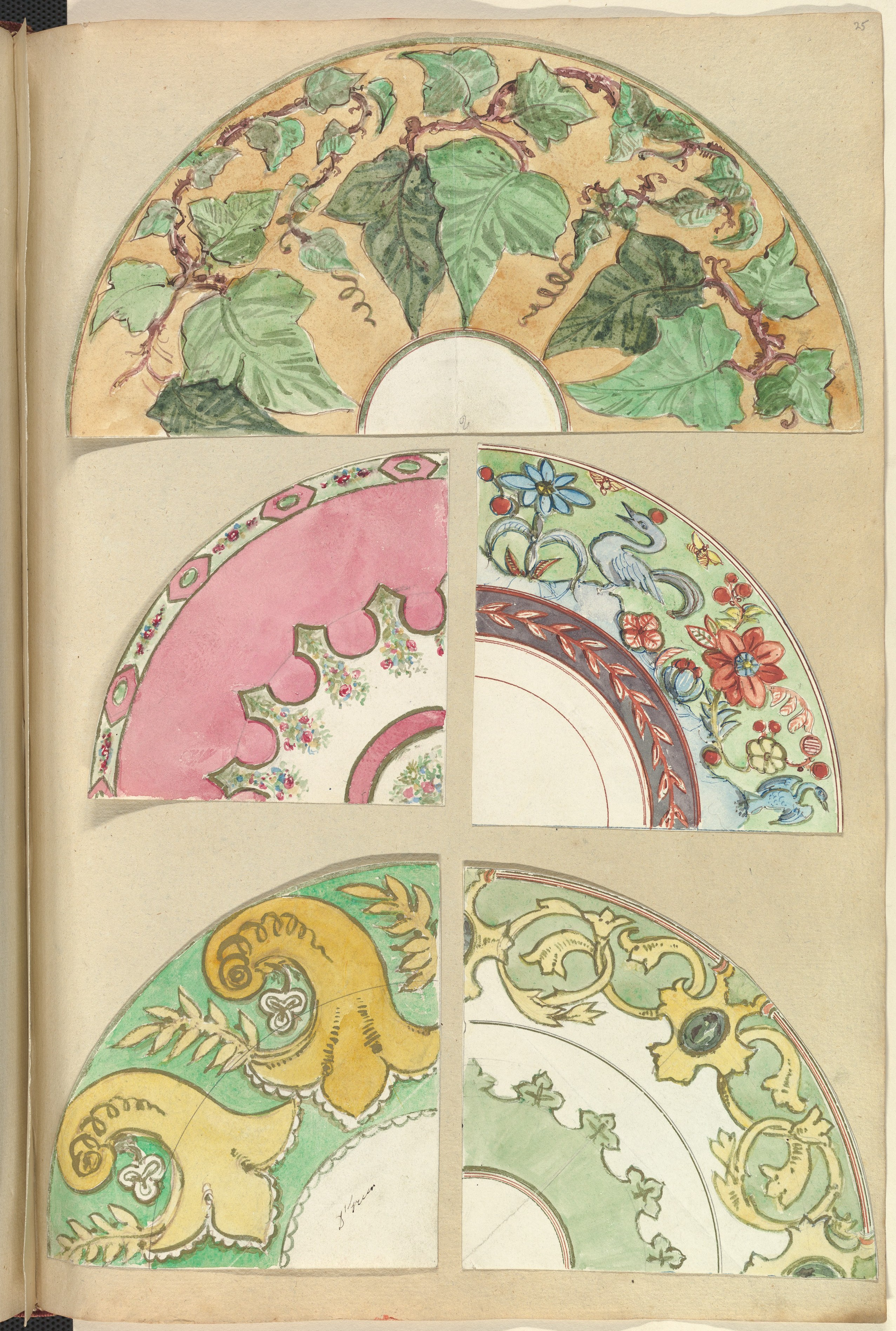
Plate designs, 1845–55

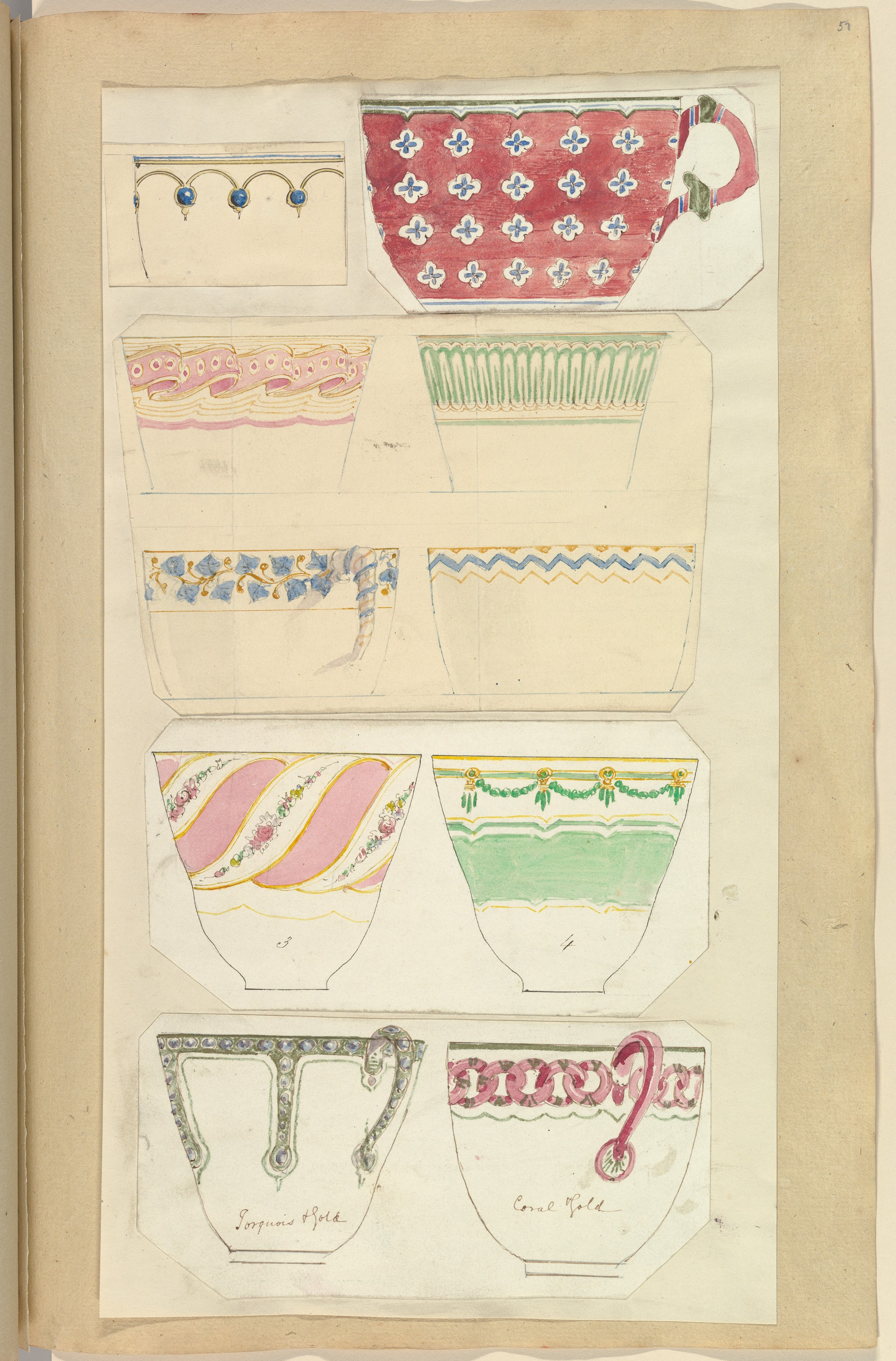
tea cup designs, 1845–55
