= List of acts of the Parliament of the United Kingdom from 2004 =

This is a list of acts of the Parliament of the United Kingdom passed in 2004.

Acts passed since 1963 are cited by calendar year, as opposed to the convention used for earlier acts of citing the regnal year(s) in which the relevant parliamentary session was held. Each act passed in a respective year is given a chapter number (abbreviated "c."), denoted by Arabic numerals in the case of public general acts, lowercase Roman numerals in the case of local acts, or italicised Arabic numerals in the case of personal acts. These run as separate series.

44 acts of Parliament were passed in 2004: 38 public general acts and 6 local acts.

indicates that an act has been transcribed on Wikisource, indicates that an act is available to view at legislation.gov.uk, and indicates the location of the original act in the Parliamentary Archives.

== Public general acts ==
Short title	Citation	Royal assent
Long title
Consolidated Fund Act 2004 (repealed)	2004 c. 1	22 March 2004
An Act to authorise the use of resources for the service of the years ending with 31st March 2003 and 2004 and to apply certain sums out of the Consolidated Fund to the service of the years ending with 31st March 2003 and 2004. (Repealed by Appropriation (No. 2) Act 2006 (c. 24))
European Parliamentary and Local Elections (Pilots) Act 2004	2004 c. 2	1 April 2004
An Act to make provision for piloting in certain regions different methods of voting at the European Parliamentary general election in 2004 and at certain local elections held at the same time; and to enable consequential alterations to be made to voting procedures at local elections.
National Insurance Contributions and Statutory Payments Act 2004	2004 c. 3	13 May 2004
An Act to make provision relating to the payment and administration of national insurance contributions and the provision of information in connection with the payment of statutory sick pay and statutory maternity pay, and for connected purposes.
Justice (Northern Ireland) Act 2004	2004 c. 4	13 May 2004
An Act to amend Part 1 of the Justice (Northern Ireland) Act 2002; (Note: Justice (Northern Ireland) Act 2002 (c. 26)) to make further provision concerning the public prosecution service established by that Act; to impose a new duty on certain criminal justice organisations in Northern Ireland in relation to human rights standards; to make provision consequential on the dissolution of the Juvenile Justice Board; to amend the law relating to bail in Northern Ireland; to provide for the transfer of certain prisoners from Northern Ireland to another part of the United Kingdom; to amend section 103 of the Terrorism Act 2000; (Note: Terrorism Act 2000 (c. 11)) to provide for driving while disqualified to be an arrestable offence in Northern Ireland; to re-enact with amendments sections 79 to 81 of the Justice (Northern Ireland) Act 2002 and make further provision about court security officers in Northern Ireland; to enable barristers in Northern Ireland to enter into contracts for the provision of their services; and for connected purposes.
Planning and Compulsory Purchase Act 2004	2004 c. 5	13 May 2004
An Act to make provision relating to spatial development and town and country planning; and the compulsory acquisition of land.
Child Trust Funds Act 2004	2004 c. 6	13 May 2004
An Act to make provision about child trust funds and for connected purposes.
Gender Recognition Act 2004	2004 c. 7	1 July 2004
An Act to make provision for and in connection with change of gender.
Higher Education Act 2004	2004 c. 8	1 July 2004
An Act to make provision about research in the arts and humanities and about complaints by students against institutions providing higher education; to make provision about fees payable by students in higher education; to provide for the appointment of a Director of Fair Access to Higher Education; to make provision about grants and loans to students in higher or further education; to limit the jurisdiction of visitors of institutions providing higher education; and for connected purposes.
Appropriation Act 2004 (repealed)	2004 c. 9	8 July 2004
An Act to authorise the use of resources for the service of the year ending with 31st March 2005 and to apply certain sums out of the Consolidated Fund to the service of the year ending with 31st March 2005; to appropriate the supply authorised in this Session of Parliament; and to repeal certain Consolidated Fund and Appropriation Acts. (Repealed by Appropriation (No. 2) Act 2006 (c. 24))
Age-Related Payments Act 2004	2004 c. 10	8 July 2004
An Act to make provision for payments by the Secretary of State to persons over the age of 70; and to enable provision to be made for payments by the Secretary of State to persons over the age of 60.
Gangmasters (Licensing) Act 2004	2004 c. 11	8 July 2004
An Act to make provision for the licensing of activities involving the supply or use of workers in connection with agricultural work, the gathering of wild creatures and wild plants, the harvesting of fish from fish farms, and certain processing and packaging; and for connected purposes.
Finance Act 2004	2004 c. 12	22 July 2004
An Act to grant certain duties, to alter other duties, and to amend the law relating to the National Debt and the Public Revenue, and to make further provision in connection with finance.
Scottish Parliament (Constituencies) Act 2004	2004 c. 13	22 July 2004
An Act to replace Schedule 1 to the Scotland Act 1998 (Note: Scotland Act 1998 (c. 46)) making new provision in relation to the constituencies for the Scottish Parliament.
Statute Law (Repeals) Act 2004	2004 c. 14	22 July 2004
An Act to promote the reform of the statute law by the repeal, in accordance with recommendations of the Law Commission and the Scottish Law Commission, of certain enactments which (except in so far as their effect is preserved) are no longer of practical utility, and to make other provision in connection with the repeal of those enactments.
Carers (Equal Opportunities) Act 2004	2004 c. 15	22 July 2004
An Act to place duties on local authorities and health bodies in respect of carers; and for connected purposes.
Patents Act 2004	2004 c. 16	22 July 2004
An Act to amend the law relating to patents.
Health Protection Agency Act 2004	2004 c. 17	22 July 2004
An Act to establish the Health Protection Agency and make provision as to its functions.
Traffic Management Act 2004	2004 c. 18	22 July 2004
An Act to make provision for and in connection with the designation of traffic officers and their duties; to make provision in relation to the management of road networks; to make new provision for regulating the carrying out of works and other activities in the street; to amend Part 3 of the New Roads and Street Works Act 1991 (Note: New Roads and Street Works Act 1991 (c. 22)) and Parts 9 and 14 of the Highways Act 1980; (Note: Highways Act 1980 (c. 66)) to make new provision in relation to the civil enforcement of traffic contraventions; to amend section 55 of the Road Traffic Regulation Act 1984; (Note: Road Traffic Regulation Act 1984 (c. 27)) and for connected purposes.
Asylum and Immigration (Treatment of Claimants, etc.) Act 2004	2004 c. 19	22 July 2004
An Act to make provision about asylum and immigration.
Energy Act 2004	2004 c. 20	22 July 2004
An Act to make provision for the decommissioning and cleaning up of installations and sites used for, or contaminated by, nuclear activities; to make provision relating to the civil nuclear industry; to make provision about radioactive waste; to make provision for the development, regulation and encouragement of the use of renewable energy sources; to make further provision in connection with the regulation of the gas and electricity industries; to make provision for the imposition of charges in connection with the carrying out of the Secretary of State's functions relating to energy matters; to make provision for giving effect to international agreements relating to pipelines and offshore installations; and for connected purposes.
Fire and Rescue Services Act 2004	2004 c. 21	22 July 2004
An Act to make provision about fire and rescue authorities and their functions; to make provision about employment by, and powers of employees of, fire and rescue authorities; to make provision about education and training and pension schemes; to make provision about the supply of water; to make provision about false alarms of fire; to provide for the funding of advisory bodies; and for connected purposes.
Sustainable and Secure Buildings Act 2004	2004 c. 22	16 September 2004
An Act to make provision in relation to matters connected with buildings.
Public Audit (Wales) Act 2004	2004 c. 23	16 September 2004
An Act to confer further functions on the Auditor General for Wales; to make provision about the audit of accounts of public bodies in Wales and related matters; to make provision about economy, efficiency and effectiveness in relation to public bodies and registered social landlords in Wales; and for connected purposes.
Employment Relations Act 2004	2004 c. 24	16 September 2004
An Act to amend the law relating to the recognition of trade unions and the taking of industrial action; to make provision about means of voting in ballots under the Trade Union and Labour Relations (Consolidation) Act 1992; (Note: Trade Union and Labour Relations (Consolidation) Act 1992 (c. 52)) to amend provisions of that Act relating to rights of members and non-members of trade unions and to make other provision about rights of trade union members, employees and workers; to make further provision concerning the enforcement of legislation relating to minimum wages; to make further provision about proceedings before and appeals from the Certification Officer; to make further provision about the amalgamation of trade unions; to make provision facilitating the administration of trade unions and the carrying out by them of their functions; and for connected purposes.
Horserace Betting and Olympic Lottery Act 2004	2004 c. 25	28 October 2004
An Act to make provision for the sale of the Tote; to make provision for the abolition of the horserace betting levy system; to make provision for the establishment of National Lottery games designed to raise money in connection with the hosting by London of the Olympic Games in 2012; and for connected purposes.
Christmas Day (Trading) Act 2004	2004 c. 26	28 October 2004
An Act to prohibit the opening of large shops on Christmas Day and to restrict the loading or unloading of goods at such shops on Christmas Day.
Companies (Audit, Investigations and Community Enterprise) Act 2004	2004 c. 27	28 October 2004
An Act to amend the law relating to company auditors and accounts, to the provision that may be made in respect of certain liabilities incurred by a company's officers, and to company investigations; to make provision for community interest companies; and for connected purposes.
Domestic Violence, Crime and Victims Act 2004	2004 c. 28	15 November 2004
An Act to amend Part 4 of the Family Law Act 1996, (Note: Family Law Act 1996 (c. 27)) the Protection from Harassment Act 1997 (Note: Protection from Harassment Act 1997 (c. 40)) and the Protection from Harassment (Northern Ireland) Order 1997; (Note: Protection from Harassment (Northern Ireland) Order 1997 (SI 1997/1180)) to make provision about homicide; to make common assault an arrestable offence; to make provision for the payment of surcharges by offenders; to make provision about alternative verdicts; to provide for a procedure under which a jury tries only sample counts on an indictment; to make provision about findings of unfitness to plead and about persons found unfit to plead or not guilty by reason of insanity; to make provision about the execution of warrants; to make provision about the enforcement of orders imposed on conviction; to amend section 58 of the Criminal Justice Act 2003 (Note: Criminal Justice Act 2003 (c. 44)) and to amend Part 12 of that Act in relation to intermittent custody; to make provision in relation to victims of offences, witnesses of offences and others affected by offences; and to make provision about the recovery of compensation from offenders.
Highways (Obstruction by Body Corporate) Act 2004	2004 c. 29	15 November 2004
An Act to apply section 314 of the Highways Act 1980 to offences under sections 137 and 137ZA of that Act.
Human Tissue Act 2004	2004 c. 30	15 November 2004
An Act to make provision with respect to activities involving human tissue; to make provision about the transfer of human remains from certain museum collections; and for connected purposes.
Children Act 2004	2004 c. 31	15 November 2004
An Act to make provision for the establishment of a Children's Commissioner; to make provision about services provided to and for children and young people by local authorities and other persons; to make provision in relation to Wales about advisory and support services relating to family proceedings; to make provision about private fostering, child minding and day care, adoption review panels, the defence of reasonable punishment, the making of grants as respects children and families, child safety orders, the Children's Commissioner for Wales, the publication of material relating to children involved in certain legal proceedings and the disclosure by the Inland Revenue of information relating to children.
Armed Forces (Pensions and Compensation) Act 2004	2004 c. 32	18 November 2004
An Act to make new provision for establishing pension and compensation schemes for the armed or reserve forces; to amend the Pensions Appeal Tribunals Act 1943; (Note: Pensions Appeal Tribunals Act 1943 (6 & 7 Geo. 6. c. 39)) to provide for the transfer of the property, rights and liabilities of the Royal Patriotic Fund Corporation to a registered charity; and for connected purposes.
Civil Partnership Act 2004	2004 c. 33	18 November 2004
An Act to make provision for and in connection with civil partnership.
Housing Act 2004	2004 c. 34	18 November 2004
An Act to make provision about housing conditions; to regulate houses in multiple occupation and certain other residential accommodation; to make provision for home information packs in connection with the sale of residential properties; to make provision about secure tenants and the right to buy; to make provision about mobile homes and the accommodation needs of gypsies and travellers; to make other provision about housing; and for connected purposes.
Pensions Act 2004	2004 c. 35	18 November 2004
An Act to make provision relating to pensions and financial planning for retirement and provision relating to entitlement to bereavement payments, and for connected purposes.
Civil Contingencies Act 2004	2004 c. 36	18 November 2004
An Act to make provision about civil contingencies.
Hunting Act 2004	2004 c. 37	18 November 2004
An Act to make provision about hunting wild mammals with dogs; to prohibit hare coursing; and for connected purposes.
Consolidated Fund (No. 2) Act 2004 (repealed)	2004 c. 38	16 December 2004
An Act to authorise the use of resources for the service of the years ending with 31st March 2005 and 31st March 2006 and to apply certain sums out of the Consolidated Fund to the service of the years ending with 31st March 2005 and 31st March 2006. (Repealed by Appropriation (No. 2) Act 2006 (c. 24))

== Local acts ==
Short title	Citation	Royal assent
Long title
London Local Authorities Act 2004	2004 c. i	13 May 2004
An Act to confer further powers upon local authorities in London; and for related purposes.
Mersey Tunnels Act 2004	2004 c. ii	1 July 2004
An Act to amend provisions of the County of Merseyside Act 1980 (Note: County of Merseyside Act 1980 (c. x)) relating to the levying, revision and application of tolls for use of the Mersey Tunnels and to amend that Act for other purposes.
Ipswich Market Act 2004	2004 c. iii	1 July 2004
An Act to enable the holding of markets on the highway in Ipswich; to make new provision for the regulation of those markets; and for connected purposes.
University of Manchester Act 2004	2004 c. iv	8 July 2004
An Act to transfer to The University of Manchester all rights, properties, assets and obligations of The Victoria University of Manchester and University of Manchester Institute of Science and Technology and to dissolve those bodies; to enact provisions with regard to The University of Manchester; and for other purposes.
Medway Council Act 2004	2004 c. v	28 October 2004
An Act to confer powers on Medway Council for the better control of street trading in the borough of Medway.
University of Wales, Cardiff Act 2004	2004 c. vi	28 October 2004
An Act to dissolve the University of Wales College of Medicine; to transfer all rights, properties and liabilities of the said College to the University of Wales, Cardiff; to make provisions as to the funds held by or on behalf of the University of Wales, Cardiff; and for connected and other purposes.

== See also ==
- List of acts of the Parliament of the United Kingdom
