= Ipswich Market =

Ancient market in Ipswich, England

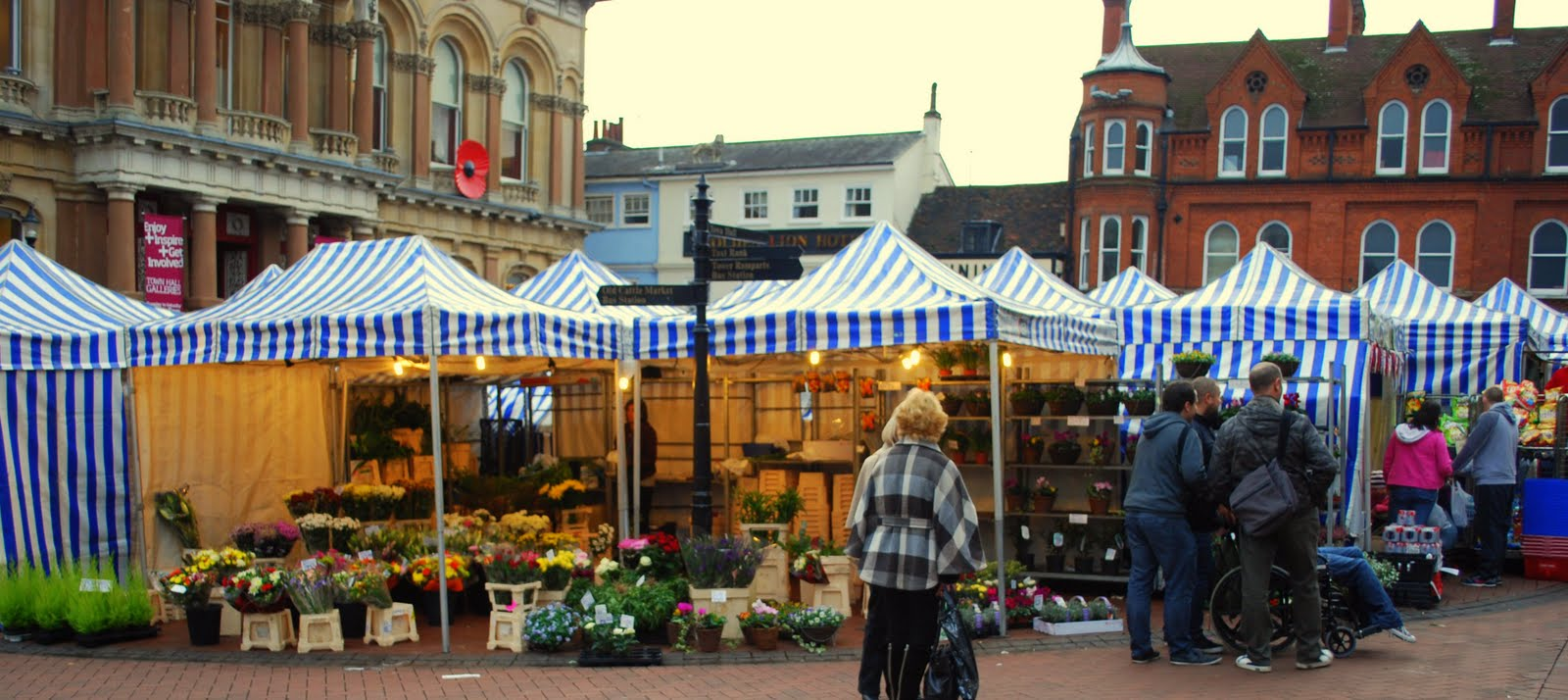
Ipswich Market in 2011

Ipswich Market is a market located in Ipswich, Suffolk, England.

== History ==
Ipswich has had markets since at least 1233.

The first royal charter to hold a market in Ipswich was granted in 1317.

Ipswich was granted its royal charter to hold a market in 1518, which enabled it to allow the market on council land or to grant licenses on private land.

Ipswich Market Act 2004
- Act of Parliament
- Parliament of the United Kingdom
- Long title: An Act to enable the holding of markets on the highway in Ipswich; to make new provision for the regulation of those markets; and for connected purposes.
- Citation: 2004 c. iii

Dates
- Royal assent: 1 July 2004

Status: Current legislation

Text of statute as originally enacted

The Ipswich Market Act 2004 (c. iii) is a local act of the Parliament of the United Kingdom allowing the market to expand on to highways. As of 2026, the act remains in force.

In 2007, the market switched from three days a week to 4 days a week.

In 2026, Ipswich Borough Council announced that the market would be moved to the northern side of the Cornhill, so that public realm works could be begun in Lloyd Avenue.

As of 2026, the market continues to run 4 days a week.

== Trade ==
The market has featured fruit and vegetable grocers, fishmongers, and bread bakers.
