= Carers (Equal Opportunities) Act 2004 =

Act of the Parliament of the United Kingdom

Carers (Equal Opportunities) Act 2004 (Note: Section 6(1).)
- Act of Parliament
- Parliament of the United Kingdom
- Long title: An Act to place duties on local authorities and health bodies in respect of carers; and for connected purposes.
- Citation: 2004 c. 15
- Introduced by: Hywel Francis (Commons); Lord Ashley of Stoke (Lords)
- Territorial extent: England and Wales (Note: Section 6(7).)

Dates
- Royal assent: 22 July 2004
- Commencement: 22 July 2004 (section 6); 1 April 2005 (sections 1–5, for England); 18 April 2005 (sections 1–5, for Wales); (Note: Section 6(2) to (4). The Carers (Equal Opportunities) Act 2004 (Commencement) (England) Order 2005 (SI 2005/876). The Carers (Equal Opportunities) Act 2004 (Commencement) (Wales) Order 2005 (SI 2005/1153).)
Other legislation
Amended by	Local Education Authorities and Children's Services Authorities (Integration of Functions) Order 2010; Health and Social Care Act 2012; Care Act 2014 and Children and Families Act 2014 (Consequential Amendments) Order 2015; Social Services and Well-being (Wales) Act 2014 (Consequential Amendments) Regulations 2016

Status: Partially repealed

Text of statute as originally enacted

Text of the Carers (Equal Opportunities) Act 2004 as in force today (including any amendments) within the United Kingdom, from legislation.gov.uk.

The Carers (Equal Opportunities) Act 2004 (c. 15) is an act of the Parliament of the United Kingdom aimed at helping carers achieve fair access to training, work and leisure opportunities.

It is sometimes referred to as Sam's Bill.

== Background ==
It was introduced as a private member's bill by Dr. Hywel Francis and sponsored in the House of Lords by Lord Ashley of Stoke.

5.2 million people in England and Wales identified themselves in the 2001 Census as providing unpaid care to support family members, friends, neighbours or others because of long-term physical or mental ill-health, disability or old age. That represented nearly 10 per cent of the population and of those, 21 per cent (1.09 million) provided care for 50 or more hours per week.

== Content ==
The act requires assessments to be offered to carers, to consider the needs of carers in relation to leisure, education, training and work. Not all carers will wish to pursue all of these opportunities but practitioners completing assessments with the carer should be able to signpost carers to other relevant agencies.

The Act

1. places a duty on local authorities to tell carers about their rights,
2. places a duty on local authorities to consider whether the carer works or wishes to work, wishes to study or have some leisure activities, when they are carrying out a carer's assessment,
3. gives local authorities strong powers to enlist the help of health, housing and education authorities in providing support for carers.

== Commencement ==
With respect to outside interests, the act came into force in 2005.

The following orders have been made under section 6(2):

- The Carers (Equal Opportunities) Act 2004 (Commencement) (England) Order 2005 (S.I. 2005/876 (C. 37))
- The Carers (Equal Opportunities) Act 2004 (Commencement) (Wales) Order 2005 (S.I. 2005/1153 (W. 70) (C. 53))
