= Armed Forces Personnel Administration Agency =

Former executive agency in the UK

The Armed Forces Personnel Administration Agency (AFPAA) was a UK Ministry of Defence Tri-Service Defence Agency from April 1997 until it was merged into the Service Personnel and Veterans Agency on 2 April 2007.

Its role was to provide a full range of pay, pensions and personnel administration services to the British Armed Forces. In January 1998 the Agency’s commercial Public Private Partnership (PPP) partner, Electronic Data Systems Defence Ltd (EDS), assumed responsibility for the delivery of Information Systems.

AFPAA operated from sites at Gosport, Glasgow, RAF Innsworth and Worthy Down Camp.

== History ==
- October 2001. The Army’s Personnel, Pay and Pensions administration (PPPA) organisation transferred to AFPAA.
- September 2002. The incorporation of the Joint Personnel Administration Strategy Study within AFPAA ensured closer liaison with the rest of the Agency as the Joint Personnel Administration (JPA) project moved forward.
- June 2004. Creation of Tri-Service pensions delivery in Glasgow as the first phase of Joint Personnel Administration Centre (JPAC) implementation.
- April 2005. Joint Casualty and Compassionate Centre (JCCC) and MoD Medal Office fully operational.
- March 2006. Roll-out of Joint Personnel Administration (JPA) to the Royal Air Force.
