= Highways (Obstruction by Body Corporate) Act 2004 =

Public General Act of Parliament of the United Kingdom

- Act of Parliament
- Parliament of the United Kingdom
- Long title: An Act to apply section 314 of the Highways Act 1980 to offences under sections 137 and 137ZA of that Act.
- Citation: 2004 c. 29
- Territorial extent: England and Wales

Dates
- Royal assent: 15 November 2004
- Commencement: 15 January 2005
Other legislation
Relates to	Highways Act 1980

Status: Current legislation

Text of statute as originally enacted

Text of the Highways (Obstruction by Body Corporate) Act 2004 as in force today (including any amendments) within the United Kingdom, from legislation.gov.uk.

The Highways (Obstruction by Body Corporate) Act 2004 (c. 29) is an act of the Parliament of the United Kingdom.

== Background ==
Nicholas Van Hoogstraten had claimed that the footpath through his land was not a public right of way and had therefore blocked access to it using a barn, barbed wire and old refrigeration units.

== Parliamentary debates ==
The bill for this act passed through its stages in the House of Commons on the following dates:

First Reading	7 January 2004
Second Reading	6 February 2004
Committee	11 March 2004
Report and Third Reading	21 May 2004

The bill for this act passed through its stages in the House of Lords on the following dates:

First Reading	24 May 2004
Second Reading	16 July 2004
Committee	21 October 2004
Third Reading	8 November 2004

== Provisions ==
The act allowed made officers of a company liable for the offence of obstruction of a footpath.

=== Section 1 - Liability of officers etc. for obstruction by body corporate ===
Section 1(1) inserts references to sections 137 and 137ZA of Highways Act 1980 into section 314(3) of that act.

Section 1(2) provides that section 314 of that Act applies by virtue of this section to any offence under section 137ZA(3) committed after the commencement of this Act, including one committed in respect of an order made before that commencement.

=== Section 2 - Commencement and short title ===
Section 2(1) provides that the act came into force at the end of the period of two months that began on the date on which it was passed. The word "months" means calendar months. The day (that is to say, 15 November 2004) on which the act was passed (that is to say, received royal assent) is included in the period of two months. This means that the Act came into force on 15 January 2005.

== See also ==
- Highway Act
