= Age-Related Payments Act 2004 =

Act of the Parliament of the United Kingdom

Age-Related Payments Act 2004 (Note: Section 11.)
- Act of Parliament
- Parliament of the United Kingdom
- Long title: An Act to make provision for payments by the Secretary of State to persons over the age of 70; and to enable provision to be made for payments by the Secretary of State to persons over the age of 60.
- Citation: 2004 c. 10
- Territorial extent: England and Wales; Scotland; (Note: Section 10.)

Dates
- Royal assent: 8 July 2004
- Commencement: 8 July 2004 (Note: Section 4(b) of the Interpretation Act 1978.)
Other legislation
| Amends | Social Security Administration Act 1992 |
| Amended by | Welfare Reform Act 2009; Public Services Reform (Scotland) Act 2010 (Consequential Modifications of Enactments) Order 2011; Transfer of Functions (Age-Related Payments) Order 2013; Regulation and Inspection of Social Care (Wales) Act 2016 (Consequential Amendments) Regulations 2018 |

Status: Amended

Text of statute as originally enacted

Revised text of statute as amended

The Age-Related Payments Act 2004 (c. 10) is an act of the Parliament of the United Kingdom.

Equivalent provision is made for Northern Ireland by the Age-Related Payments (Northern Ireland) Order 2004 (SI 2004/1987) (NI 11).

== Legislative passage ==
The act was passed as a money bill, which was very unusual for not directly concerning either taxation or finance.

== Provisions ==
The act allows lump sums of to be paid to individuals who are 70 years old and older. In 2004, there was a lump sum of £100 paid to people aged over 70 under the act.

The act implemented a pledge Gordon Brown had made in the 2003 budget.
