= Veterans Agency =

Former executive agency in the UK

Logo of Veterans Agency

The Veterans Agency was an Executive Agency of the UK government's Ministry of Defence (MoD). It was amalgamated into the Service Personnel and Veterans Agency (SPVA) on 2 April 2007 under the brand Veterans-UK.

== History ==
It was formerly known as the "War Pensions Agency" and was part of the Department of Social Security. When, in 2001, the latter was reorganised into the Department for Work and Pensions, the War Pensions Agency became an Executive Agency of the Ministry of Defence and, in 2003, changed its name to the Veterans Agency.

It was the single point of contact within the MoD for providing information, help and advice on issues of concern to veterans and their families. It did this through its free Helpline, welfare service and website.

The term 'veteran' is used to mean all those who have served in HM Armed Forces (whether Regular or Reserve). This group has been commonly known as ex-Service personnel. The term veteran also includes their widows/widowers and their dependants as part of the veterans' community. As well as all members of the Armed Forces the term veteran also, exceptionally, includes those members of the Merchant Navy who played a vital role in legally defined military operations. The veterans' community is therefore a wide and disparate population, estimated to be over 10 million people in the United Kingdom.

The Agency provided advice on a wide range of subjects including benefits and welfare issues, pensions and compensation, Service records and medals etc.

== The Veterans Agency Vision ==
Service excellence for veterans and Serving personnel.

== Core functions ==
To administer the War Pensions Scheme which provides financial support to approximately 250,000 war pensioners and war widow(er)s living in over 100 countries throughout the world, although most are resident in the UK.

The Agency also administered the Armed Forces Compensation Scheme. This was mainly applicable to Serving personnel.

In addition, the Agency managed the War Pensioners' Welfare Service (WPWS) which in turn manages Ilford Park Polish Home (IPPH).

The War Pensioners’ Welfare Service gives support to existing War Pensioners, war widow(er)s and veterans who are in the process of making a claim for a war disablement pension. WPWS will arrange home visits as required to discuss any particular issues that may be affecting individuals. Welfare managers often liaise with colleagues in other Government departments or ex-Service organisations to ensure the best help and advice is supplied where needed.

Ilford Park Polish Home provides residential and nursing care to people who qualify for admission under the 1947 Polish Resettlement Act.

The Agency contributed to a greater awareness of veterans and their concerns, undertaking a programme of PR activity.

== Also ==
The Agency also:

- co-ordinated, managed and delivered services to the veterans community as directed by United Kingdom Government;
- administered the ex-gratia payment scheme for former prisoners of the Japanese in World War II in accordance with Government policy; and
- contributed to advice given to the Department and Ministers on war pensions policy matters.

== Additional functions ==
In addition to the above core functions, the Agency:

- provided administrative support to the Central Advisory Committee (CAC) on war pensions and War Pensions Committees (WPC);
- administered the nomination of Government appointees to certain charitable bodies
- co-ordinated nominations for non-State honours from ex-Service organisations representing war pensioners, war widow(er)s and WPC's; and
- contributed to the management of Leopardstown Park Hospital, Dublin.
