= European Parliamentary and Local Elections (Pilots) Act 2004 =

- Act of Parliament
- Parliament of the United Kingdom
- Long title: An Act to make provision for piloting in certain regions different methods of voting at the European Parliamentary general election in 2004 and at certain local elections held at the same time; and to enable consequential alterations to be made to voting procedures at local elections.
- Citation: 2004 c. 2
- Territorial extent: England and Wales

Dates
- Royal assent: 1 April 2004
- Commencement: 1 April 2004

Status: Spent

Text of statute as originally enacted

The European Parliamentary and Local Elections (Pilots) Act 2004 (c. 2) is an act of the Parliament of the United Kingdom.

The act allowed an all-postal ballot to be piloted in four regions of the United Kingdom: North East, the East Midlands, Yorkshire and the Humber and the North West, at the local and European Parliament elections.

The legislation was supported by the Local Government Association.
