= Royal Patriotic Fund Corporation =

Patriotic Fund Act 1867 (Note: Section 1.)
- Act of Parliament
- Parliament of the United Kingdom
- Long title: An Act to make better Provision for the Administration of the Patriotic Fund.
- Citation: 30 & 31 Vict. c. 98
- Territorial extent: United Kingdom

Dates
- Royal assent: 12 August 1867
- Commencement: 12 August 1867 (Note: The Acts of Parliament (Commencement) Act 1793.)
- Repealed: 1 January 1904
Other legislation
Repeals/revokes	Patriotic Fund Act 1866
Amended by	Patriotic Fund Act 1881; Patriotic Fund Act 1886
Repealed by	Patriotic Fund Reorganisation Act 1903

Status: Repealed

Text of statute as originally enacted

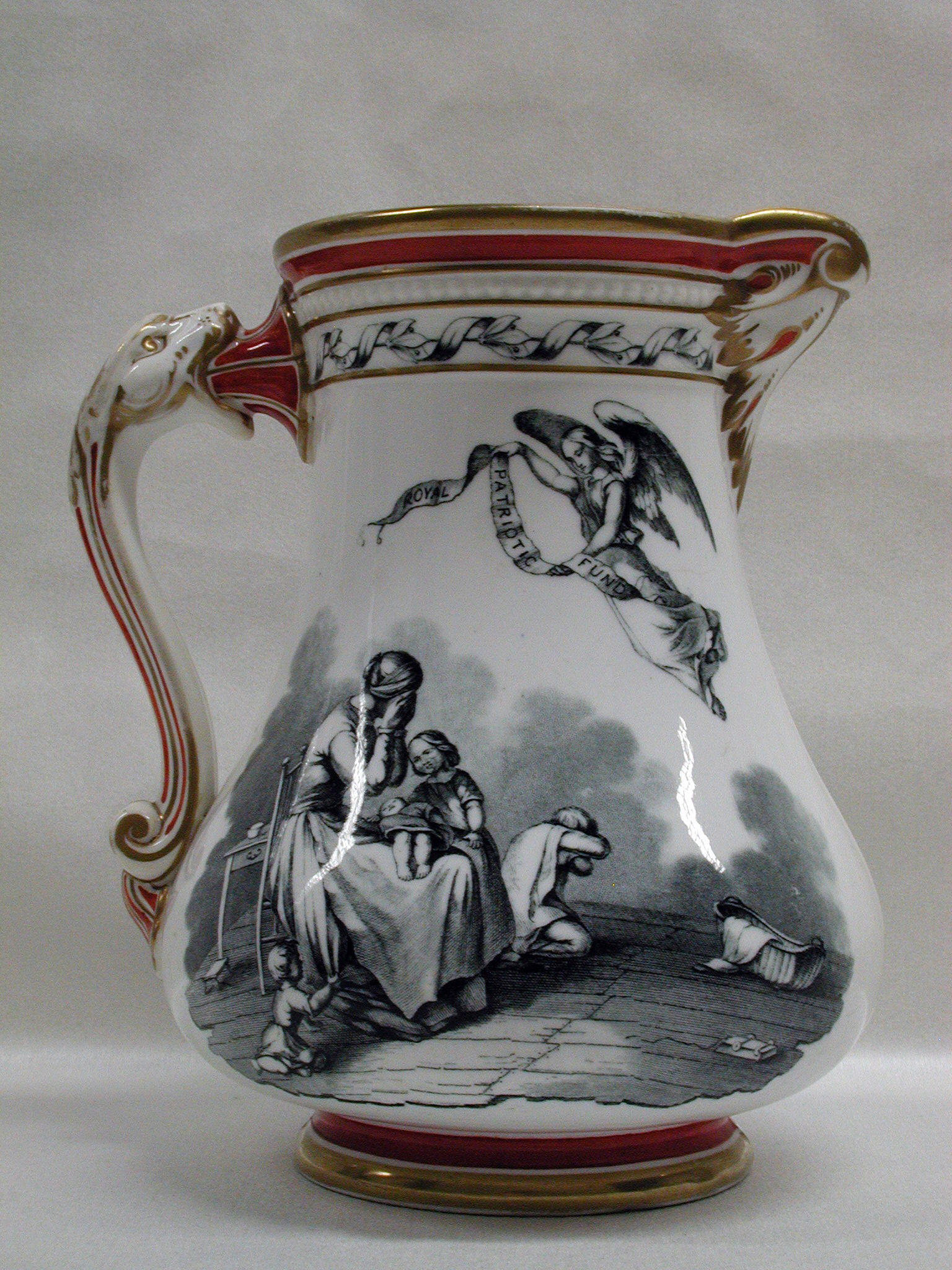
Samuel Alcock & Co, Jug for the Royal Patriotic Fund, 1855, Staffordshire pottery; the other side

Patriotic Fund Act 1881
- Act of Parliament
- Parliament of the United Kingdom
- Long title: An Act to amend the Patriotic Fund Act, 1867, and make further provision respecting certain Funds administered by the same Commissioners as the Patriotic Fund.
- Citation: 44 & 45 Vict. c. 46
- Territorial extent: United Kingdom

Dates
- Royal assent: 22 August 1881
- Commencement: 22 August 1881
- Repealed: 1 January 1904
Other legislation
Amends	Patriotic Fund Act 1867
Amended by	Patriotic Fund Act 1886; Patriotic Fund Act 1899
Repealed by	Patriotic Fund Reorganisation Act 1903

Status: Repealed

Text of statute as originally enacted

Patriotic Fund Act 1886
- Act of Parliament
- Parliament of the United Kingdom
- Long title: An Act to amend the Patriotic Fund Acts, 1867 and 1881.
- Citation: 49 & 50 Vict. c. 30
- Territorial extent: United Kingdom

Dates
- Royal assent: 25 June 1886
- Commencement: 25 June 1886
- Repealed: 1 January 1904
Other legislation
Amends	Patriotic Fund Act 1867; Patriotic Fund Act 1881
Amended by	Patriotic Fund Act 1899
Repealed by	Patriotic Fund Reorganisation Act 1903

Status: Repealed

Text of statute as originally enacted

Patriotic Fund Act 1899 (Note: Section 2.)
- Act of Parliament
- Parliament of the United Kingdom
- Long title: An Act to amend the Patriotic Fund Act, 1881, and the Patriotic Fund Act, 1886.
- Citation: 62 & 63 Vict. c. 45
- Territorial extent: United Kingdom

Dates
- Royal assent: 9 August 1899
- Commencement: 9 August 1899
- Repealed: 1 January 1904
Other legislation
Amends	Patriotic Fund Act 1881; Patriotic Fund Act 1886
Repealed by	Patriotic Fund Reorganisation Act 1903

Status: Repealed

Text of statute as originally enacted

Patriotic Fund Reorganisation Act 1903 (Note: Section 5(1).)
- Act of Parliament
- Parliament of the United Kingdom
- Long title: An Act to reorganise the Administration of the Patriotic Fund.
- Citation: 3 Edw. 7. c. 20
- Territorial extent: United Kingdom

Dates
- Royal assent: 11 August 1903
- Commencement: 1 January 1904 (Note: Section 5(2).)
- Repealed: 1 January 2006 (Note: The Armed Forces (Pensions and Compensation) Act 2004 (Commencement No. 3) Order 2005 (SI 2005/3107).)
Other legislation
Repeals/revokes	Patriotic Fund Act 1867; Patriotic Fund Act 1881; Patriotic Fund Act 1886; Patriotic Fund Act 1899
Amended by	Charities Act 1960; Statute Law (Repeals) Act 2004
Repealed by	Armed Forces (Pensions and Compensation) Act 2004

Status: Repealed

Text of statute as originally enacted

Revised text of statute as amended

Royal Patriotic Fund (Transfer of Property, Rights And Liabilities) Order 2005
- Statutory Instrument
- Parliament of the United Kingdom
- Citation: SI 2005/3308
- Territorial extent: United Kingdom

Dates
- Made: 1 December 2005
- Laid before Parliament: 7 December 2005
- Commencement: 1 January 2006
Other legislation
Made under	Armed Forces (Pensions and Compensation) Act 2004

Status: Amended

Text of statute as originally enacted

The Royal Patriotic Fund Corporation (also known as the Royal Pat) was a charitable body set up by royal warrant in the United Kingdom during the Crimean War. It provided assistance to the widows, orphans and other dependants of members of the armed forces. Under the Royal Patriotic Fund (Transfer of Property, Rights And Liabilities) Order 2005 (SI 2005/3308) these responsibilities were transferred to RPFC, a charitable company limited by guarantee.

The fund has both a General Council and a smaller Executive Committee, which handles the daily running of the organisation.

The fund was reorganized by the Patriotic Fund Reorganisation Act 1903 (3 Edw. 7. c. 20). RPFC was registered as a charity by the Charity Commission for England and Wales on 6 April 2005 and removed from the register on 23 September 2011.

== Representatives ==
Representatives have included

- Admiral Cyprian Bridge; 1906 to 1912; Admiralty Representative
- David Charles Ross Heyhoe Esq; 1998
- John Fraser Esq OBE; 1998
