= Armed Forces Pension Scheme =

British military pension scheme

The Armed Forces Pension Scheme (AFPS) is the pension scheme of the British Armed Forces. It is a defined benefit scheme administered by Defence Business Services (DBS), a business unit within the Ministry of Defence (MOD).

== History ==
=== AFPS 05 ===
The AFPS was reviewed in 1995 as part of the Independent Review of the Armed Forces’ Manpower, Career and Remuneration Structures under the chairmanship of Michael Bett. The review's reforms were not implemented because it was considered that the recommendations on career structures needed to be addressed before the proposals on pensions could be taken forward.

In March 2001, the Labour government published a consultation on a review of the AFPS 75. The consultation reported that some of the scheme's features were "inconsistent with other public sector schemes" and that some provisions "fell short of best practice in modern pension schemes generally". Proposals for a new scheme were published in October 2003. The Armed Forces Pension Scheme 2005 (AFPS 05) was introduced under the Armed Forces (Pensions and Compensation) Act 2004 with new entrants to the armed forces automatically joining the scheme from 6 April 2005.

=== AFPS 15 ===
On 1 April 2015, the AFPS 15 was introduced for all new members of the British Armed Forces. The AFPS 15 is a voluntary, non-contributory, Career Average Revalued Earnings (CARE), unfunded, defined benefit, occupational pension scheme.

== Recipients ==
As of 31 March 2024, the pension liability of the AFPS was valued at £144.6 billion.

== See also ==
- Pensions in the United Kingdom
- Chelsea Pensioner
