= Service Personnel and Veterans Agency =

Former executive agency in the UK

- Agency logo

Agency overview
- Formed: 2 April 2007
- Dissolved: 1 April 2014
- Jurisdiction: United Kingdom
- Parent agency: Ministry of Defence

The Service Personnel and Veterans Agency, abbreviated as (SPVA) was an executive agency of the Ministry of Defence of the United Kingdom. The agency provided personnel with pensions, welfare, and support to current and veteran service members of the British Armed Forces. It was formed on 2 April 2007, with the amalgamation of the Armed Forces Personnel Administration Agency, and the Veterans Agency. In early April 2014, the agency then merged with the Defence Business Services.

== History ==
The formation of the agency led to the provision of a fully integrated set of 'through life' personnel services to those who were currently serving or former service members. A single contact attempt made with the agency granted access to customer information and advice on pay, pensions, compensation, records of service, as well as medal entitlement. The responsibility for all pension provided, whether a War pension or an Armed Forces fell under the direct control of the agency, reducing the risk of omitting or duplicating crucial information.

=== Dissolution ===
The executive agency status was removed on 16 June 2011 due to plans and preparations for it to be merged with the Defence Business Services organisation which occurred in on 1 April 2014.

== Functions ==
=== Veterans badges ===
The agency administered the distribution of the Armed Forces Veteran's Badge with over 811,000 being issued in October, 2010. Those who were eligible to receive the badge must have been a member of the British Army, Royal Navy, Royal Marines, Royal Air Force, Volunteers, or Reservists.

== See also ==
- Veterans#Britain
