= Defence Business Services =

UK government agency

Defence Business Services (DBS)
Agency overview
- Formed: 4 July 2011
- Jurisdiction: United Kingdom
- Headquarters: Bristol, England, United Kingdom
- Parent agency: Ministry of Defence

Defence Business Services (DBS) is one of the largest ‘Shared Services Centres’ in Europe and was initially set up to deliver Corporate HR, Payroll, Armed Forces Pensions and Compensation, Finance, Vetting and Information Services across the Ministry of Defence (MOD).

== History ==
DBS is an organisation within the UK Government's Ministry of Defence and is responsible for providing corporate services to the department. It was established on 4 July 2011 by bringing together several MOD executive agencies.
