= Armed Forces (Pensions and Compensation) Act 2004 =

Act of the Parliament of the United Kingdom

Armed Forces (Pensions and Compensation) Act 2004 (Note: Section 12.)
- Act of Parliament
- Parliament of the United Kingdom
- Long title: An Act to make new provision for establishing pension and compensation schemes for the armed or reserve forces; to amend the Pensions Appeal Tribunals Act 1943; to provide for the transfer of the property, rights and liabilities of the Royal Patriotic Fund Corporation to a registered charity; and for connected purposes.
- Citation: 2004 c. 32
- Territorial extent: United Kingdom

Dates
- Royal assent: 18 November 2004
- Commencement: Various (Note: Section 8.)
Other legislation
Amends	Naval and Marine Pay and Pensions Act 1865; Naval and Military War Pensions, &c. Act 1915; War Pensions (Administrative Provisions) Act 1918; Pensions Appeal Tribunals Act 1943; Royal Patriotic Fund Corporation Act 1950; Chronically Sick and Disabled Persons Act 1970; Judicature (Northern Ireland) Act 1978; Social Security Act 1980; Forfeiture Act 1982; Child Support, Pensions and Social Security Act 2000; Pensions Appeal Tribunals (Late Appeals) Regulations 2001
Repeals/revokes	Patriotic Fund Reorganisation Act 1903
Amended by	Constitutional Reform Act 2005; Transfer of Tribunal Functions Order 2008; Public Service Pensions Act 2013

Status: Amended

Text of statute as originally enacted

Revised text of statute as amended

The Armed Forces (Pensions and Compensation) Act 2004 (c. 32) is an act of the Parliament of the United Kingdom.

== Provisions ==
The act provides for the newest iteration of the Armed Forces Compensation Scheme (AFPS) in 2005. The act closed the existing iteration of the AFPS in 2005.

The act increase the pension age for veterans to receive their pensions from 60 to 65.

=== Section 7 – Amendments and repeals ===
Section 7(2) was repealed by paragraph 228(l) of Schedule 3 to the Transfer of Tribunal Functions Order 2008 (SI 2008/2833)

=== Section 8 – Commencement ===
The following orders have been made under this section:

- The Armed Forces (Pensions and Compensation) Act 2004 (Commencement No. 1) Order 2005 (SI 2005/116 (C. 4))
- The Armed Forces (Pensions and Compensation) Act 2004 (Commencement No. 2) Order 2005 (SI 2005/356 (C. 13))
- The Armed Forces (Pensions and Compensation) Act 2004 (Commencement No. 3) Order 2005 (SI 2005/3107 (C. 133))

=== Schedule 1 - Amendments to Pensions Appeal Tribunals Act 1943 ===
Paragraphs 8 and 9 were repealed on 3 April 2006 by section 146 of, and Part 2 of Schedule 18 to, the Constitutional Reform Act 2005.

== Reception ==
The act was criticised by the Commons Defence Select Committee as being unfair.

== See also ==
- Armed Forces Act
