= John Hayward (artist) =

British stained glass artist (1929–2007)

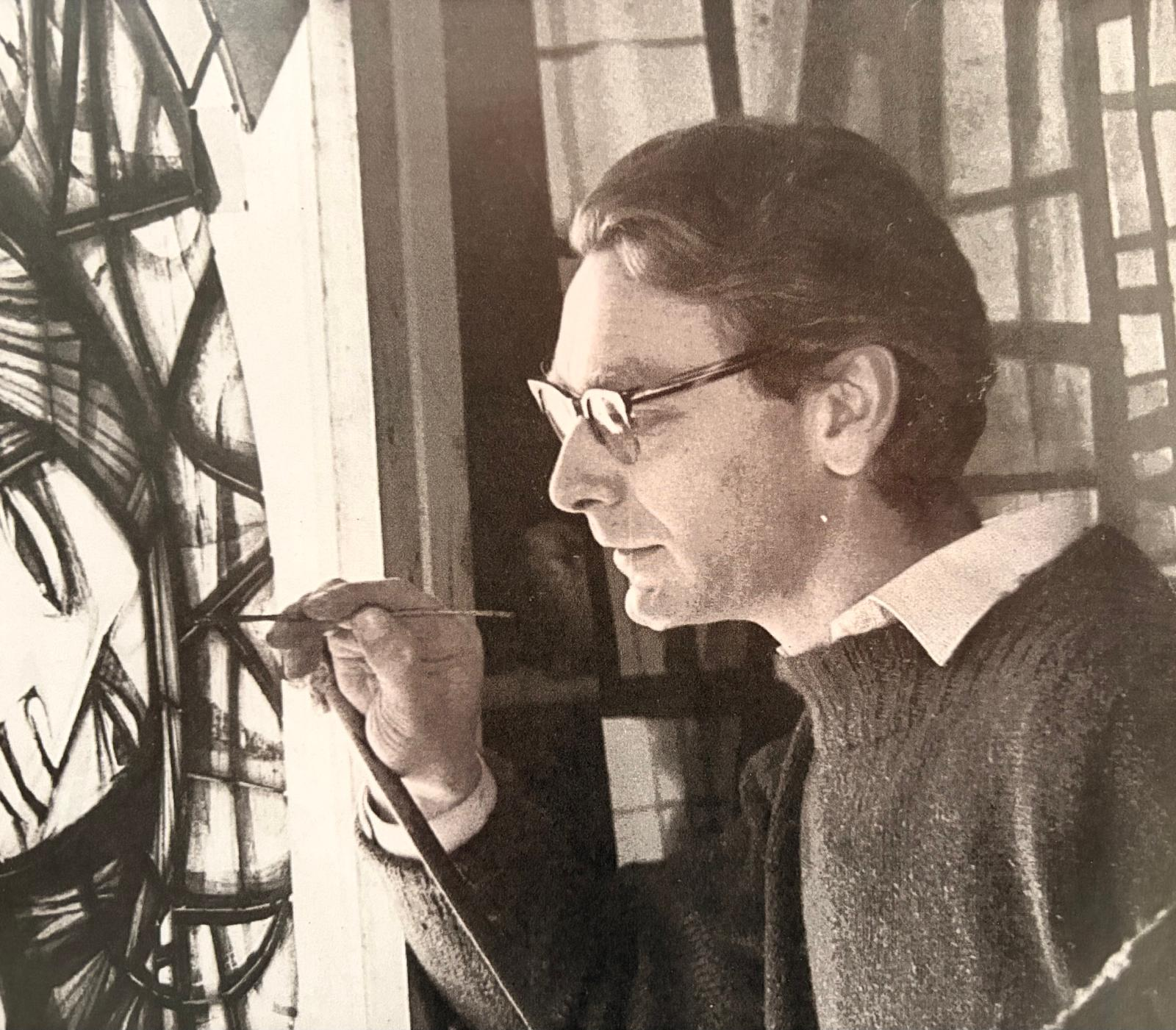
- John Hayward, c.1963
- Born: John David Hayward; 16 July 1929; Tooting, London, United Kingdom
- Died: 19 May 2007 (aged 77); Corscombe, Dorset, United Kingdom
- Education: Saint Martin’s School of Art
- Known for: Stained glass
- Style: Figurative modernism
- Elected: Fellow of the British Society of Master Glass Painters

John Hayward (16 July 1929 – 19 May 2007) was an English multidisciplinary artist best known for his work in stained glass. His ecclesiastical work was widely commissioned across the United Kingdom and abroad in the second half of the 20th century and is characterised by its fusion of traditional figurative iconography with modernist design sensibilities.

In total Hayward designed and made around 200 stained glass windows during his career, including for the church of St Mary-le-Bow in the City of London, Norwich Cathedral, and Sherborne Abbey in Dorset. Hayward's practice also incorporated sculpture, murals, and liturgical furnishings, most notably for Blackburn Cathedral.

== Early life and education ==
John David Hayward was born in Tooting, London, into a Methodist family. His upbringing was influenced by the craft skills of his parents - his father was a printer - and strong engagement in church life. He was educated at Tooting Bec Grammar School, where his artistic ability was recognised by his teacher Jack Levin, who encouraged an early interest in drawing and painting. His childhood included frequent time spent in the countryside, which fostered a lasting engagement with landscape that would later inform his artistic language.

After the war, Hayward won a place to study at Saint Martin’s School of Art, where he trained initially as a painter. During this period he was exposed to the work of artists such as Georges Seurat, Georges Braque, and Piero della Francesca, whose use of structure, colour, and the placement of figures within landscapes would influence his later work. Hayward also developed an interest in Byzantine mosaics and Christian iconography, particularly those associated with Ravenna. He later received training in the design and manufacture of stained glass under Francis Spear, which helped direct Hayward's career toward ecclesiastical art.

== Career ==
=== Early career with Faith Craft ===
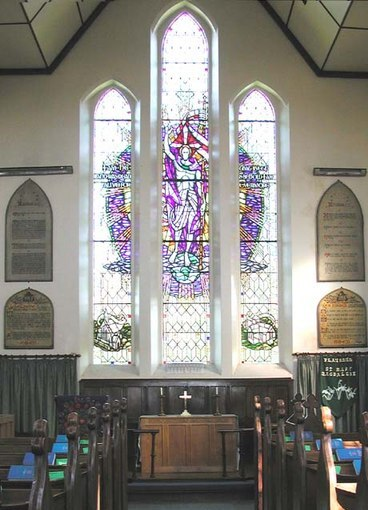
St Mary Magdalene, Flaunden, east window (1955)

In the early 1950s Hayward was offered a place at the Royal College of Art. However, he chose instead to enter professional practice, recognising the bountiful opportunities available to ecclesiastical artists due to the significant church building and restoration then underway in post-war Britain. In around 1953 Hayward joined Faith Craft, a St Albans-based firm specialising in church furnishings and interiors that had been established the Society of the Faith in 1916. Here he would work on commissions across a variety of media, including stained glass, furniture, metalwork, and mural painting. The experience bought Hayward into contact with many other designers working in the field, including contemporaries such as Terence Randall, Francis Stephens and Gordon Beningfield.

Although Faith Craft closed in 1969, partially retained records held by the Society of Faith indicate some of the windows commissioned from the firm that Hayward designed, sometimes working in collaboration with other artists. These include examples at Paisley Abbey (1954, with Francis Stephens), Christ Church in Streatham (1955), St Mary Magdalene in Flaunden (1955), St Jude's in Blackburn (1959) and St Matthew in Camberwell (1961). Of particular note are three windows Hayward made in 1956 for St Mary's Anglican Cathedral in Johannesburg, South Africa. Hayward was also responsible for more complete fitting out of churches under the auspices of Faith Craft. In 1959 he provided designs for fixtures including the reredos, rood, crucifix, candlesticks and altar rails, as well as stained glass for both St Andrew's Church in Accrington and St Aiden's in Durham.

Importantly for Hayward's own future direction, the networks he forged at Faith Craft exposed him to the ideas of the Liturgical Movement, one of the central tenets of which was the re-evaluation of the functional and theological purpose of church space with the intent of better engaging a congregation in the rituals of worship. For architects such as Laurence King, who would become a close associate of Hayward, this introduced the idea that ecclesiastical design should respond to more than just decorative considerations.

=== Establishing an independent studio ===
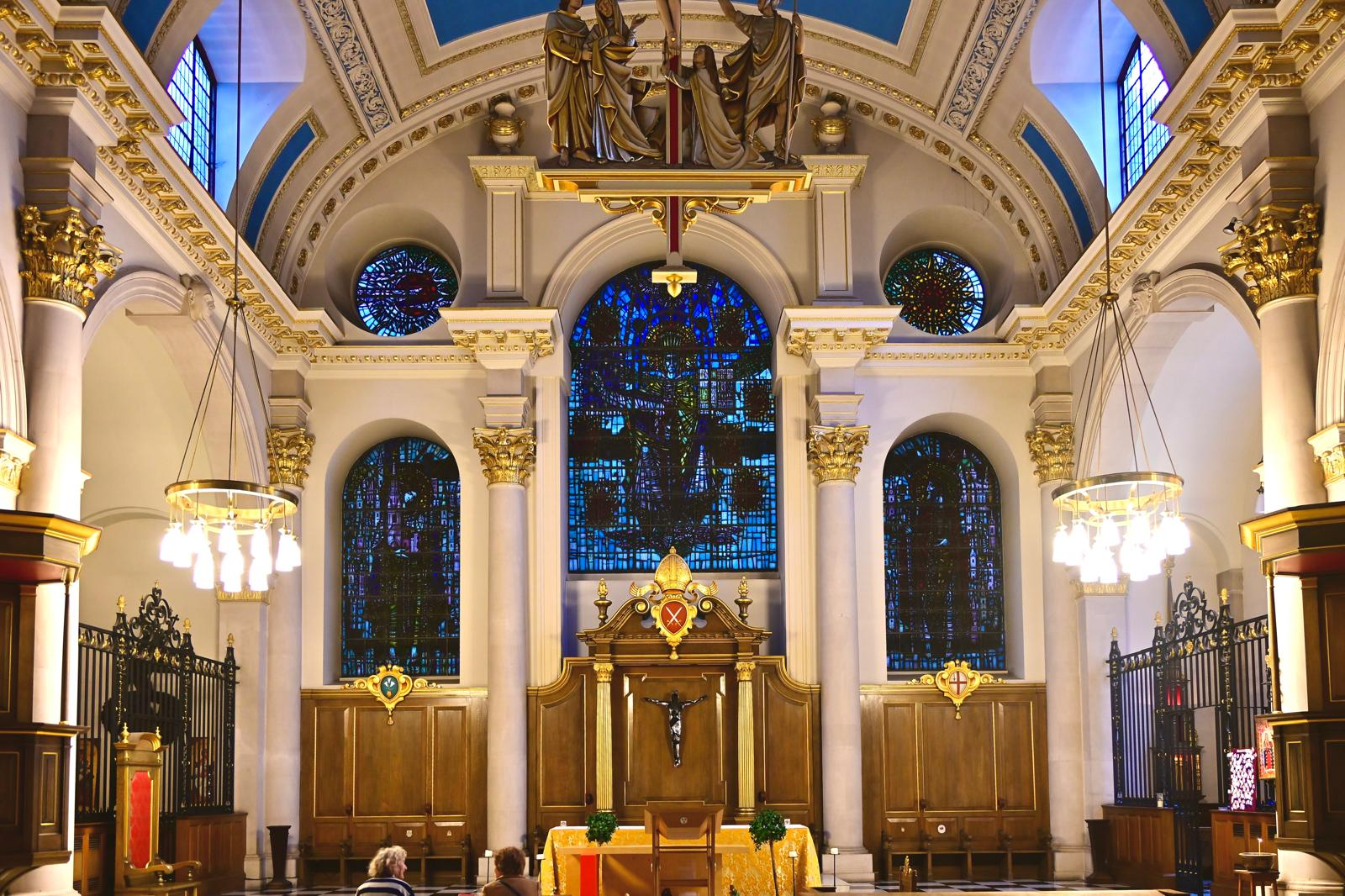
Interior of St-Mary-Le-Bow with glass by Hayward (1963-64

In 1961 Hayward took the decision to established himself as an independent artist, setting up his studio at Bletchingley in Surrey. Nevertheless, his ties to former colleagues at Faith Craft remained strong. Indeed, Hayward's first major independent commission was for a scheme of windows for the rebuilt Christopher Wren church of St Mary-le-Bow in the City of London. The full interior restoration of the church had been awarded to Faith Craft in 1956 and was undertaken by a team of architects and artists led by Laurence King. Taking eight years to complete, it was Faith Craft's largest single commission. In the same year that Hayward established his studio, King asked him to design and manufacture the complete glazing scheme for the church. The ten windows he produced, installed between 1963 and 1964, remain among Hayward's best known works, combining bold palettes of colour and sharp geometries with recognisable figurative iconography. Across the three principal windows installed in the east wall, the image of Christ in Majesty is flanked on either side by the Virgin Mary and St Paul. Mary cradles the church, while behind both her and Paul are 'tapestries' comprising the spires of the City of London's other churches and St Paul's Cathedral. The windows in the west wall reference the governance of the City and the heraldry of the Great Twelve Livery Companies.

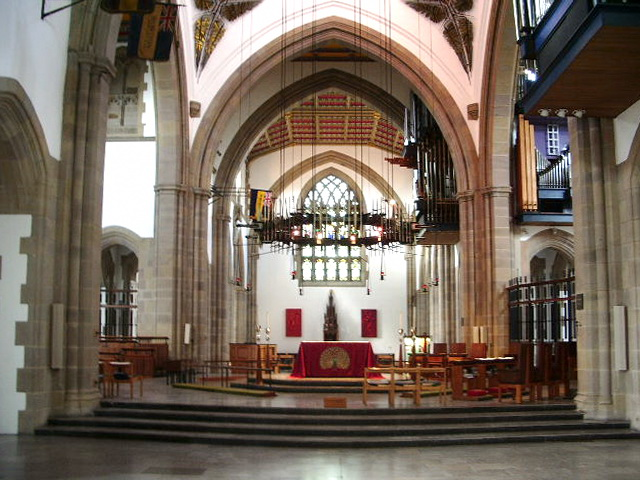
Sanctuary of Blackburn Cathedral, with Hayward's Corona (1961-64)

At the outset, Hayward's independent practice continued to be multidisciplinary and his relationship with King would lead to more commissions. In 1961 King was appointed architect to Blackburn Cathedral, the former parish church of St Mary that became a cathedral with the creation of the new Diocese of Blackburn in 1926. King's task was to convert the building to reflect this elevated status, adapting a project begun in 1938 but quickly abandoned due to the onset of the Second World War. Soon after winning the commission, King appointed Hayward as the cathedral's 'artist in residence' and they would work together on fixtures and fittings into the 1970s. King's scheme included placing the sanctuary beneath a new lantern tower over the crossing. For this space, Hayward designed the glass for the lantern, the four sculptures of winged seraphim in the pendentives, the large sculptural Corona that hangs above the altar, and the stone altar itself. However, due to structural inadequacies, the lantern tower had to be rebuilt in 1998/1999, with new glass commissioned from Linda Walton. In addition, Hayward designed the large fibreglass and aluminum sculpture of Christ the Worker that dominates the inside west wall. It appears to set Jesus within a cotton loom, an apparent allusion to the Lancashire's textile industries. Hayward also designed stained glass windows for the south transept and St Martin's Chapel, a painted reredos for the Jesus Chapel and the cast bronze font cover.

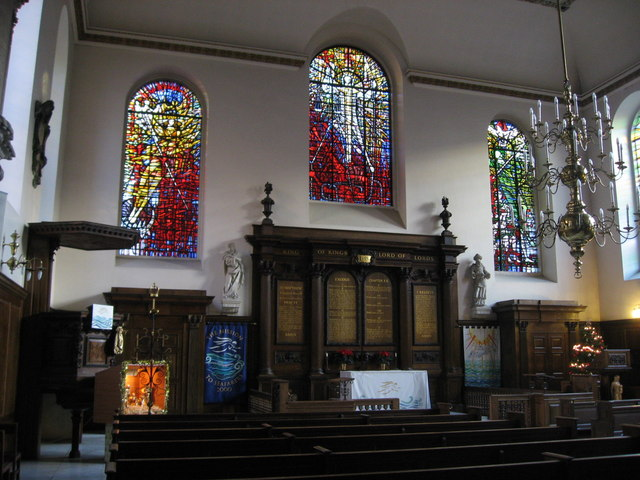
Interior of St Michael Paternoster Royal, with glass by Hayward (1968

The modern semi-abstracted design that Hayward deployed for his windows at St-Mary-le-Bow set a model for his future work in glass. His 1964 window for the chapel of St Peter’s College, Oxford, a memorial to Dr Christopher Chavasse, shows Christ in Majesty, realised in Hayward's now distinctive style. In 1968, five windows by Hayward were installed at St Michael Paternoster Royal, a City of London church a few hundred metres from St-Mary-le-Bow. Here, his equally distinctive windows form a triptych over the altar in the east wall, collectively depicting the War in Heaven as Archangel Michael triumphs over the Devil. The following year, Hayward's Dick Whittington window was installed in the north aisle of the same church.

=== Focus on stained glass ===
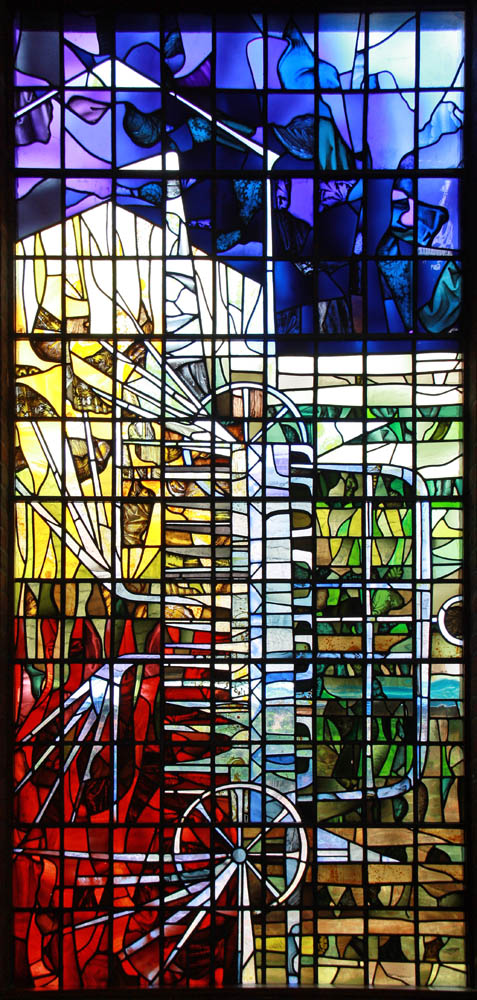
St Matthew, Croydon - one of six glass panels by Hayward (1972)

As the demand for post-war church reconstruction diminished, particularly from the 1970s onward, Hayward's practice increasingly focused on individual stained glass commissions. Most of these would come from private or institutional patrons seeking to reglaze a window in an existing building as a memorial to an individual or in commemoration of an event. While each window was conceived in response to its specific architectural setting, and with iconography tailored to the patron’s requirements, the majority would remain recognisably faithful to Hayward's breakthrough designs for St Mary-le-Bow, evolving over time without ever losing his distinctive modern idiom.

The number and diversity of such commissions mean that examples of Hayward's work from this period can be seen across the UK, though concentrated in the south of England. For St Michael & All Angels in Mitcheldean, Hayward was commissioned to replace a large window blown out during a storm in 1965. His window, dedicated in 1970, spans five lights and once again depicts St Michael defeating the Devil, the archangel holding a flaming sword as Satan lies beneath him, bound in chains. In the same year, his first of two windows for St Wulfram's Church in Grantham was installed, depicting Christ walking on water to rescue the drowning St Peter. In 1974 he completed a second window depicting the Seven Sacraments. All are in his characteristic modern style.

Nevertheless, where the setting demanded it, Hayward was not adverse to refining his style to fit a brief. The church of St Matthew in Croydon, which was rebuilt by the architect David Bush on a new site between 1965 and 1972, is a modern building notable for the simplicity of its design. As part of Bush's scheme, Hayward was commissioned to provide six rectangular panels of stained glass that provide the principal artistic interest in the wall behind the main altar. Installed in 1972, each panel has a semi abstract design representing a parable from the Gospel of Matthew. Hayward carefully integrated shards of glass taken from the windows of the demolished predecessor church.

Between 1976 and 1972 Hayward made four windows for St Mary's Church in Battersea, each depicting a notable individual connected to the parish; Benedict Arnold, William Blake, William Curtis and J. M. W. Turner. Each window includes a medallion portrait of the individual in question, surrounded by attributes, buildings and heraldry with which they are associated. A fine example of Hayward's later work done at his studio in Surrey is the east window of St Leonard's in Streatham, one of a number he created for the church. Completed in 1989 and installed in 1990 it shows Christ in Majesty surrounded by the symbols of the four Evangelists. It evidences the evolution of Hayward's style since the 1960s, while remaining recognisably part of his oeuvre.

=== Relocation to Dorset ===
In 1989 Hayward moved to Dorset with the intention of retirement. However, the appeal of a commission to reglaze the Great West Window of Sherborne Abbey proved to great an opportunity to miss. It would become one of Hayward's largest and most prominent works. The brief was to replace the Victorian glass that had suffered from significant paint loss. Hayward submitted his design to for faculty approval sometime in 1990 or 1991. However, this sparked a five-year delay as debate swirled about the loss of the older glass and the appropriateness of citing Hayward's modern design immediately below the Abbey's famous fan vault cieling. Finally approved in 1995, Hayward spent the next two years making the window, before its installation in 1997, ahead of dedication in 1998. In marked contrast to the abbey’s medieval fabric, the window uses bold colour and dynamic composition to highlight the theme of The Incarnation.

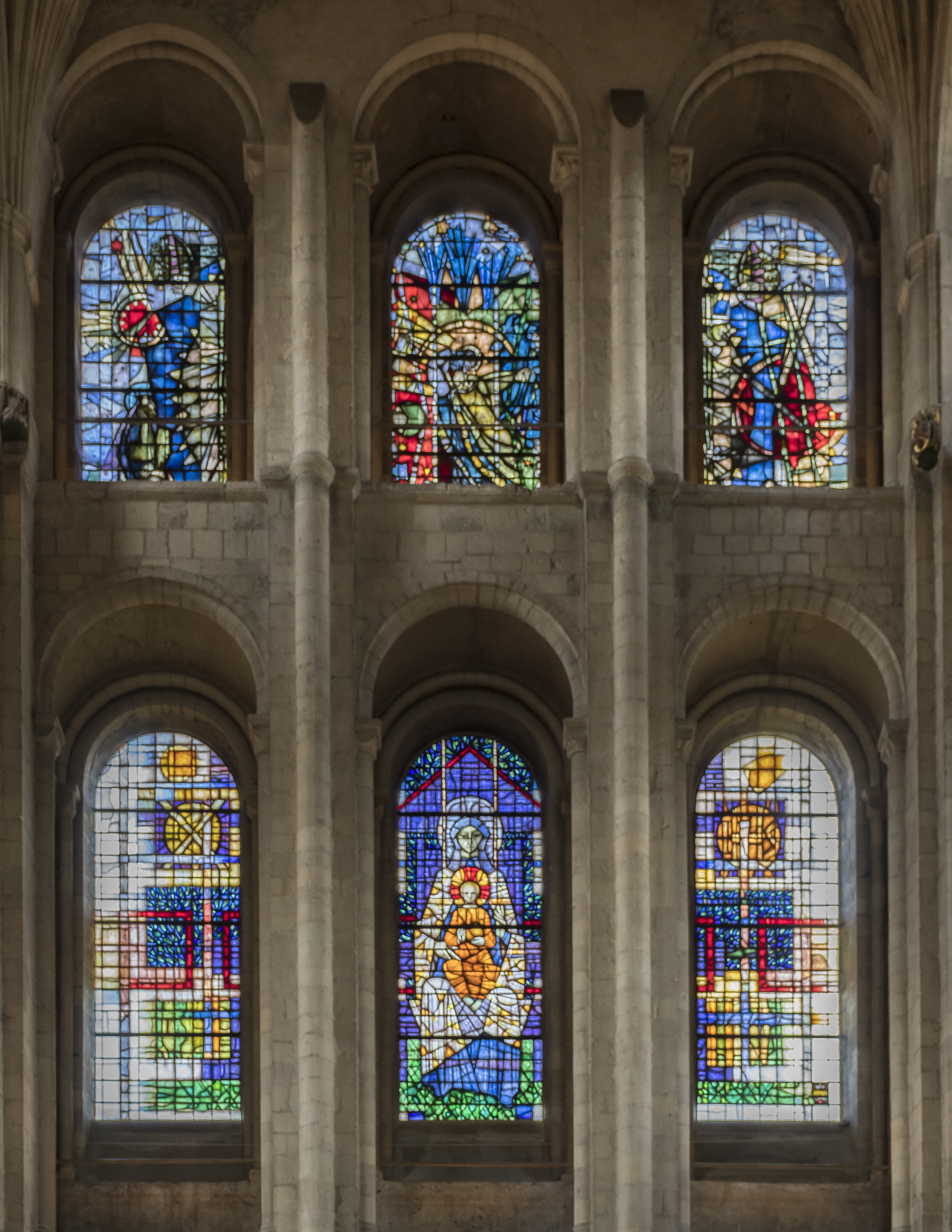
Hayward's three windows for Norwich Cathedral, below those of Keith New

Although Hayward initially intended the Great West Window as Sherborne Abbey to be his final work, he continued to accept further commissions. His triptych of windows for the north transept of Norwich Cathedral, installed in 1999, are interesting for being in direct dialogue with the work of Keith New. New was a contemporary of Hayward, though his three windows at Norwich were originally made in the 1950s for the church of St Stephen, Walbrook. They were removed during a reordering in the 1990s and transferred to Norwich. Hayward's windows occupy the space immediately below those of New, depicting the Virgin and Child and form a cohesive tableau.

Hayward would complete a second commission for Sherborne Abbey, a window to mark the turn of the Millennium. Unveiled in 2001, it commemorates both the arrival of the Benedictines at Sherborne in 998 and the visit, 1,000 years later, of Queen Elizabeth II to unveil the very window Hayward had himself designed and made.

=== Final years ===
Despite long-harboured plans to retire, Hayward continued to work right up until his sudden death at home in Corscombe, Dorset, on 19 May 2007. He was 77 years old. His final window to be completed, a depiction of St Cecilia for St Peter’s Church, Limpsfield, had only been unveiled the previous month.

Hayward's funeral service was held at St Mary's Church in Corscombe where he was a parishioner. A thanksgiving service in his memory was later held at Sherborne Abbey within view of his Great West Window.

== Style and practice ==
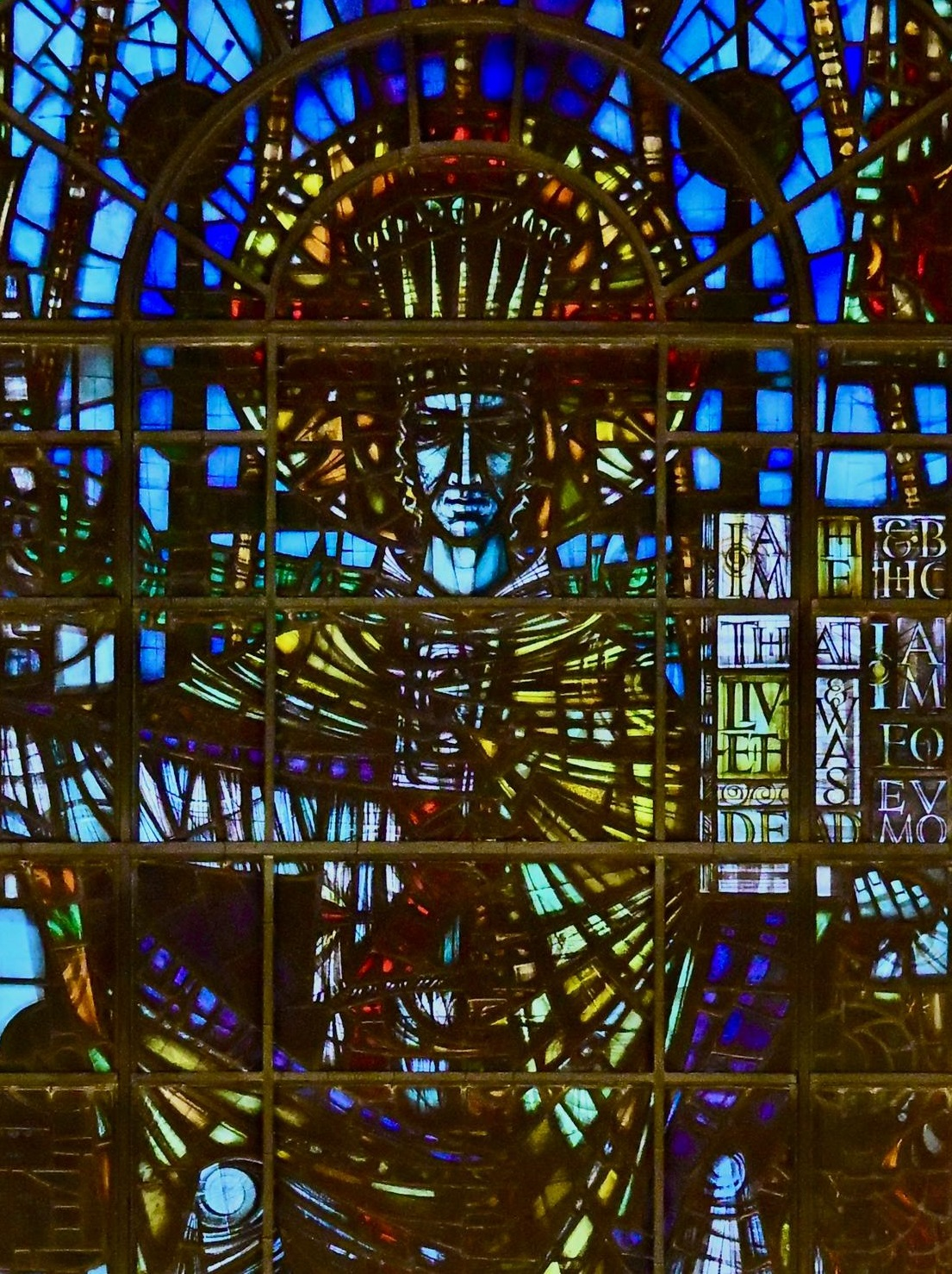
St Mary-le-Bow, Christ in Majesty (detail)

Throughout his career, Hayward remained concerned with the integration of symbolic imagery within architectural space. His windows were typically conceived in response to their specific settings and to the iconographic requirements of patrons. Nevertheless, they remained recognisably consistent with the idiom he developed in his early major commissions, notably at St Mary-le-Bow, reflecting the enduring influences of early Renaissance painting as well as Byzantine art.

Hayward's practice was always to undertake all aspects of stained glass production himself, from design through to painting and fabrication. This was an approach he began while working at the studios of Faith Craft, and continued at his studios in Surrey and Dorset. This required a high level of technical proficiency as well as artistic flair and he made extensive use of materials and processes such as flashed glass, acid etching and silver stain. Nevertheless, as it was for contemporaries with similar working practices, this encouraged a view of Hayward as more artisan than artist. It was a view promulgated by John Piper - arguably the best known of Britain's post-war stained glass designers - who engaged Patrick Reyntiens to realise his designs in glass. In his influential 1968 essay "Stained Glass: Art or Anti-Art?", Piper argued that the very processes of making required compromises that resulted in the "craftsman taking over from the artist".

Nevertheless, Hayward's distinctive style found enduring favour with both private and institutional patrons who appreciated the legible iconography that Hayward combined with modern sensibilities of colour, geometric structure and angular form. This became a particular hallmark of the British school of stained glass as it evolved from mid-century modernism and the Festival of Britain style and places Hayward among contemporaries such as Harry Stammers, Lawrence Lee, Leonard Evetts and W. T. Carter Shapland.

== Selected works in stained glass ==
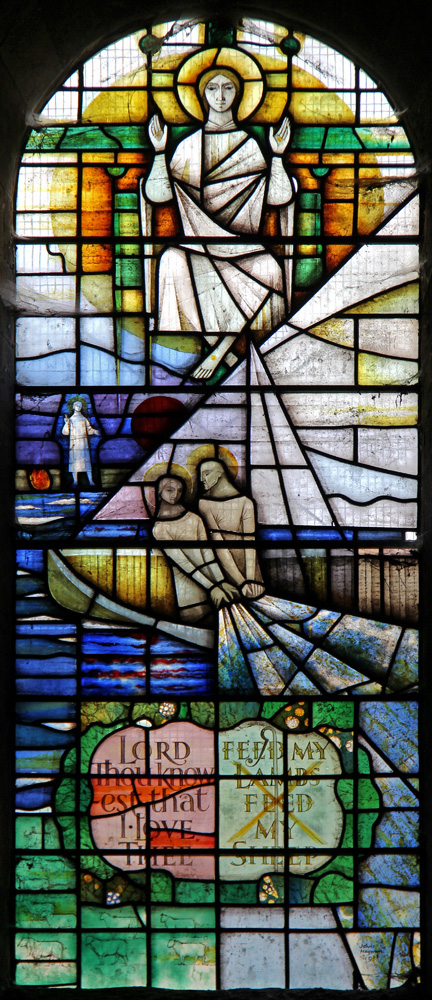
One of 10 windows by Hayward for Dunstable Priory

- St Peter's Church, Black Notley
- East chancel - Christ in Majesty (1952, with Francis Stephens)
- St Mary's Church, Monken Hadley
  - East chancel - Life of the Virgin (1952, with Francis Stephens)
- Paisley Abbey
  - Choir - WW2 memorial window, Crucifixion (1954, with Francis Stephens)
- St Peter and St Paul's Church, Harlington
  - North and south aisles - five windows, Scenes from the New Testament (1954, with Francis Stephens)
- St Mary's Church, Hayes
  - North aisle - Christ in Majesty (1954, with Francis Stephens)
- Christ Church, Streatham
  - South aisle - St Michael defeating the Devil (1955)
  - North aisle - Crucifixion, accompanied by three painted wall sculptures (1961)
  - South aisle - Cross with the Tree of Life (1981)
- St James's Church, Aston
  - South chancel - Risen Christ with St Joseph (1955)
- St Mary's Anglican Cathedral, Johannesburg, South Africa
  - Six lights in nave, six lights in east ambulatory, three lights in apse (1956)
- St Leonard's Church, Sandridge
  - West nave - St Michael defeating the Devil (1957)
- Chapel of the House of St Barnabas, Soho (now the Macedonian Orthodox Church in London)
  - 20 windows depicting the Stations of the Cross and various saints (1957-58)
- St Mary Magdalene's Church, Flaunden
  - East window - The Risen Christ (1958)
- St Jude's Church, Blackburn
  - Lady Chapel - Virgin and Child (1959)
- St Michael & All Angels Church, London Fields
  - West screen - 12 apostles (1961)
- St Nicholas's Church, Pluckley
  - North nave - Nativity (1961)
- St Matthew's Church, Camberwell
  - East window - Ascension (1961)
- St Andrew's Church, Willesden
  - Eleven windows in nave aisles - Scenes from the Life of Christ (1963)
- Church of St Mary-le-Bow, City of London
  - Ten windows, including Christ in Majesty, the Virgin Mary and St Paul in east wall (1963-1964)
- Chapel of St Peter's College, Oxford
  - East window - Christ in Majesty (1964)
- Holy Cross Church, Stuntney
  - Baptism of Christ (1964)
- St Paul's Church, Shadwell
  - East chancel - Transfiguration with Moses and Elijah (1964)
- St James's Church, Merton
  - South nave - Coats of Arms (1964)
  - West Chapel - Seven windows each depicting one of the seven sacraments (1965)
- St James's Church, New Malden
  - South porch - Suffer little children come unto me (1964)
  - Lady Chapel - Madonna and Child (1965)
- Church of St Mary & All Saints, Little Walsingham
  - East window - Virgin and Child with saints (1964)
- Chapel of the Guild of St Michael and the Holy Souls, Little Walsingham
  - 32 glass panels at line of octagonal roof - abstract (1965)
- All Saints' Church, Chingford
  - South chapel - Annunciation (1965)
- All Saints Church, Benhilton
  - South aisle - Christ in Majesty (1965)
  - South aisle, west window - Madonna and Child (1965)
- St Paul's Church, Chipperfield
  - West window - The Risen Christ (1966)
- St Mary's Church, Chilton Foliat
  - North nave - St Hubert hunting (1966)
- St Mark's Church, Regent's Park
  - South aisle - Life of St Mark (1966)
  - South aisle - Creation (c.1966-70)
- Blackburn Cathedral
  - South transept - Tree of Life with Crucifix, made with fragments of glass from removed 19th century nave windows (1967)
  - St Martin's Chapel - Abstract (1970)
- Church of St Michael Paternoster Royal, City of London
  - Five windows in east wall and first bays to north and south - War in Heaven (1968)
  - South nave - Dick Whittington (1968)
- Church of St Mary & St Bartholomew, Hampton in Arden
  - South aisle - Christ Victorious (1968)
- Worksop Priory
  - East sanctuary - Virgin and Child (1968)
- St Michael & All Angels Church, Mitcheldean
  - East window - St Michael defeating the Devil (1970)
- St Wulfram's Church, Grantham
  - North aisle - Christ Walking on Water (1970)
  - North aisle - Seven Sacraments (1973)
  - North aisle - Nativity (1979, using reset glass by William Wailes dated 1857)
- Church of St Olave Hart Street, City of London
  - South aisle - armorial window (1970)
- St Mary's Church, Old Basing
  - South aisle - Christ with Dove (1970)
  - South aisle - two roundels (2003)
- All Saints' Church, Nettleham
  - East window - Christ in a Lincolnshire landscape (1971)
- Priory Church of St Peter, Dunstable
  - Two windows in apsidal chapels - Henry I and benefactors (1972)
  - Two windows in South apsidal chapel - Annunciation and Nativity (1984)
  - Six windows in nave aisles - biblical stories (1989)
- St Matthew's Church, Croydon
  - Six glass panels - abstract design on theme of Gospel of Matthew, incorporating fragments of older glass (1972)
- St Mary the Virgin's Church, Sheering
  - West nave - St Nicholas (1974)
- St Michael and All Angels, Hackthorn
  - Nave - Coats of arms, Hackthorn Hall (1975)
- St Mary's Church, Battersea
  - South aisle - Benedict Arnold window (1976)
  - North aisle - William Blake window (1979)
  - North aisle - J. M. W. Turner window (1979)
  - South aisle - William Curtis window (1982)
- St Luke's Church, Shepherd's Bush
  - East chancel - Crucifixion, made from fragments of glass from old windows (1977)
- St Mary and the Holy Rood Church, Donington
  - North aisle - Joseph Banks, Matthew Filders & George Bass (1980)
  - South aisle - Virgin cradling the church with St Hugh & St Swithun (1981)
- St Andrew's Church, Billingborough
  - South aisle - Christ healing the sick woman (1980)
- St Leonard's Church, Streatham
  - West window - abstract design incorporating fragments of older glass (1980)
  - North east chapel - History of Streatham and St Leonard's Church (1980)
  - Narthex - Streatham Grammar School badge (1980)
  - Lady Chapel - Life of the Virgin (1982)
  - East window - Risen Christ with symbols of the Evangelists (1990)
- All Saints Church, Boxley
  - South aisle - Virgin and Child (1982)
- St Richard's Church, Haywards Heath
  - South transept - Virgin and Child (1984)
  - North transept - St Richard (1987)
- St Peter and St Paul's Church, Edgefield
  - South aisle - Canon Marcon window (1984)
  - North aisle - Christ the Fisherman (2000)
- All Saints Church, Botley
  - South nave - Seven sacraments (1984)
- St Saviour's Church, Little Venice
  - North nave - The Seven Sacraments (1985)
- St Peter's Church, Hever
  - North chapel - Five saints (1986)
- Christ Church, Swindon
  - Lady Chapel - Annunciation (1987)
- St Peter and St Paul's Church, Checkendon
  - North nave - St John, St Luke and St Cecilia (1987)
- St Martin's Church, Brasted
  - Two windows in south chapel - St Martin and Shield of St Martin (1991-1992)
- All Saints Church, Walsoken
  - South aisle - St Peter, St Dorothea, St Paul (1993)
- St Peter and St Paul's Church, King's Somborne
  - West nave - St Michael defeating the Devil, memorial to Sir Thomas Sopwith (1996)
- Sherborne Abbey
  - Great West Window - The Incarnation (1997)
  - South aisle - Millennium window (2001)
- Norwich Cathedral
  - Three windows in north transept - Virgin and Child (1999)
- Holy Trinity Church, Guildford
  - North nave, Crucifixion with Dove (1999)
- St Peter's Church, Limpsfield
  - North aisle, St Cecilia (2007)

== Selected works in other media ==
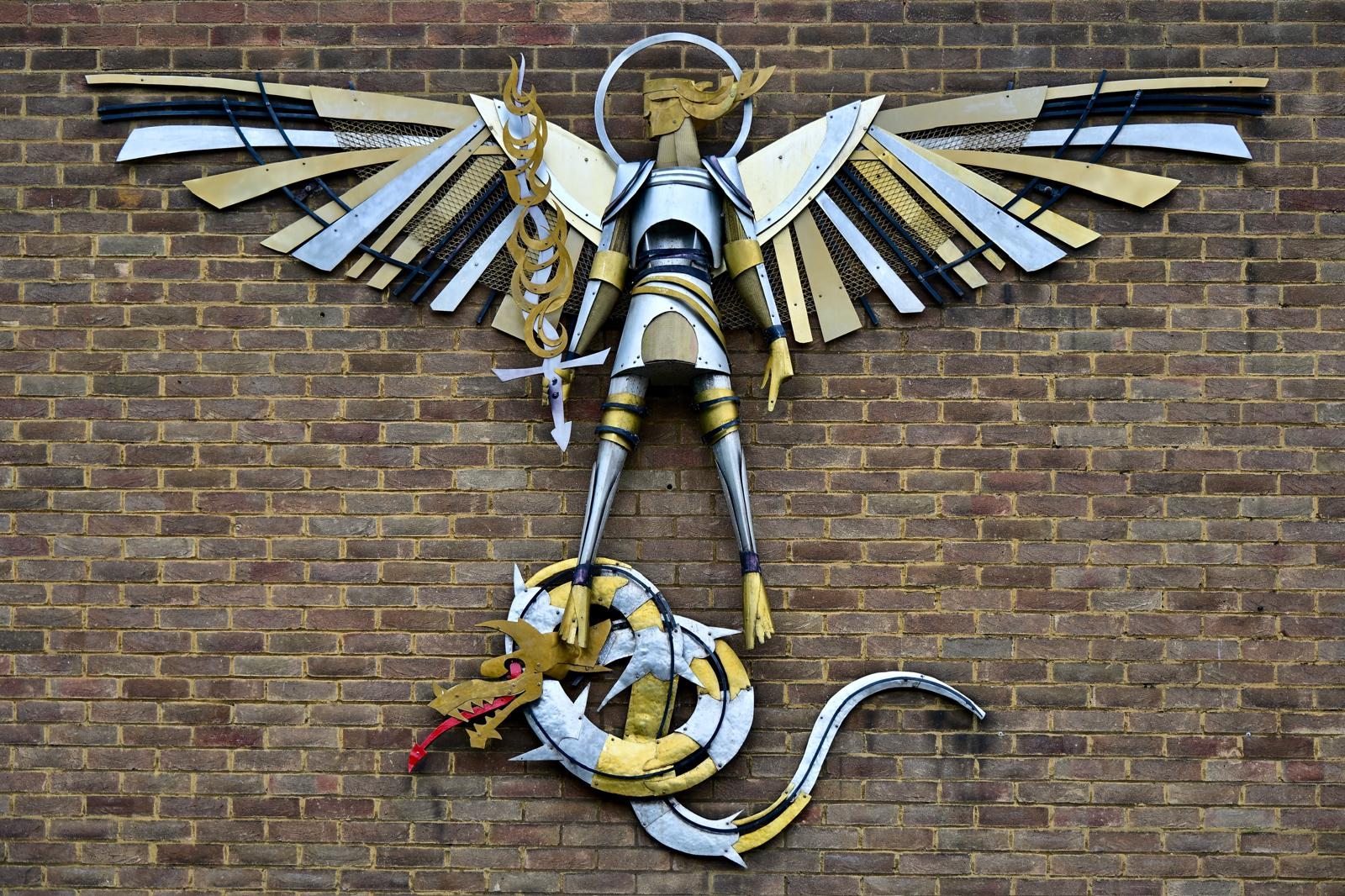
Entrance sculpture, St Michael and All Angels, London Fields (1961-62)

- St Andrew's Church, Accrington
  - Various fixtures and fittings (1959)
- St Aiden's Church, Durham
  - Various fixtures and fittings (1959)
- St Mary's Church, South Ruislip
  - Virgin and Child sculpture (c.1959)
- St Michael & All Angels Church, London Fields
  - Baptistry mural - Baptism of Christ (1961)
  - Six wall murals - Adam and Eve, the Empty Tomb, Garden of Gethsemane, Jacob's Ladder; Annunication; Nativity (1961-1962)
  - External sculpture of St Michael defeating the Devil (1962)
  - Hanging crucifix (1962)
  - Two pendentive murals - Angels of the Apocalypse (1962)
- Blackburn Cathedral
  - Christ the worker sculpture (1962)
  - Painted reredos in Jesus Chapel (1962)
  - Sanctuary corona (c.1965)
  - Altar table (c.1965)
  - Font cover (c.1965)
- Chapel of the Guild of St Michael and the Holy Souls, Little Walsingham
  - Bronze sculpture on exterior wall - St Michael defeating the Devil (1965)

== Gallery ==
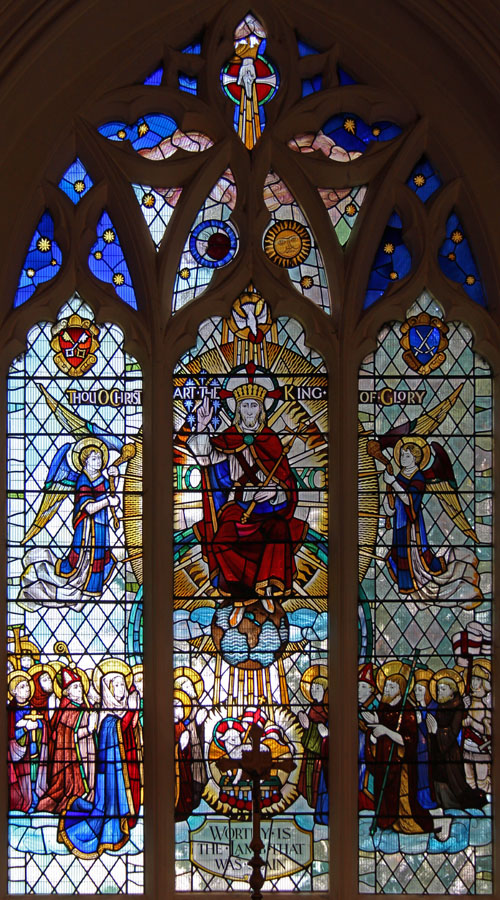
St Peter, Black Notley

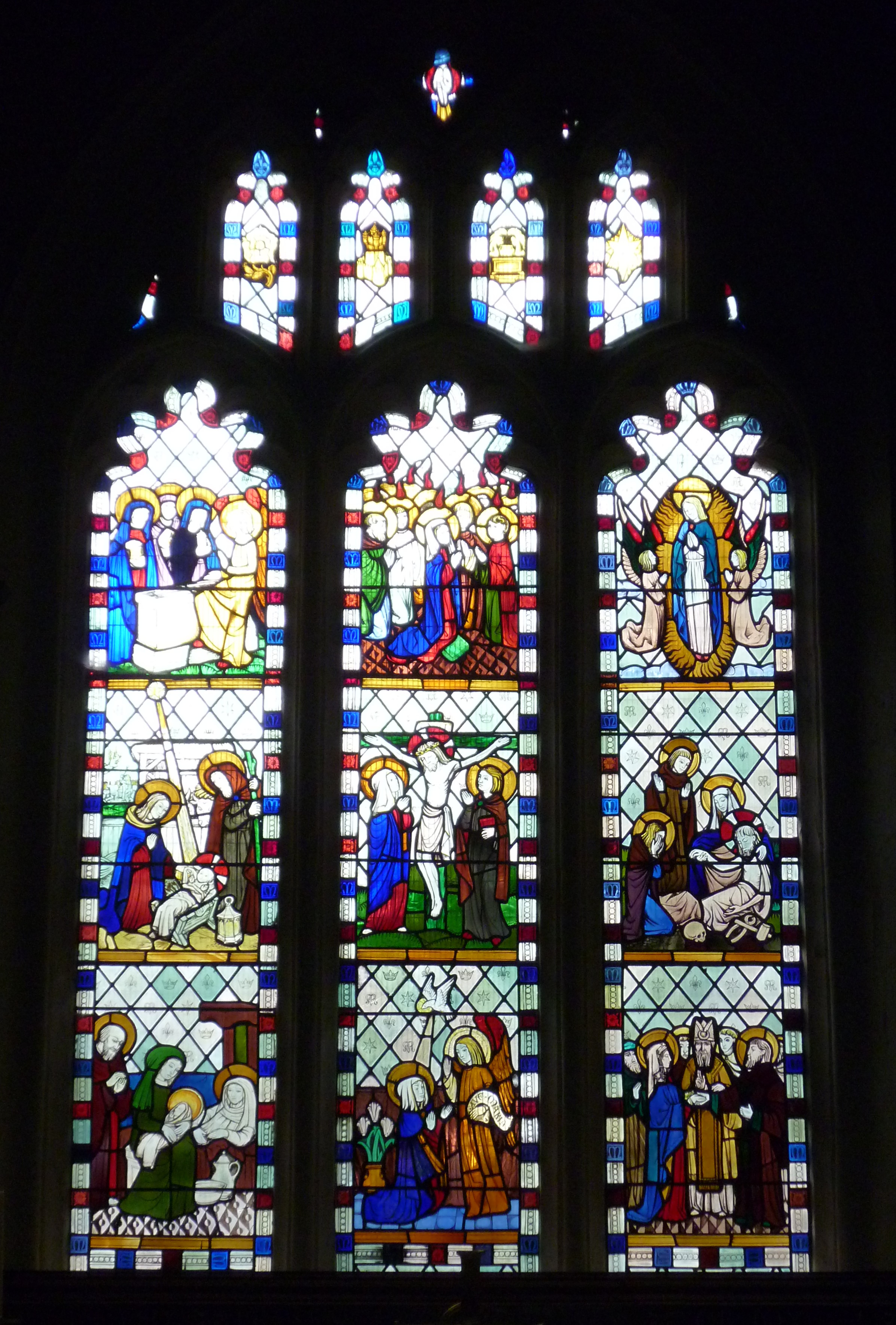
St Mary, Monken Hadley

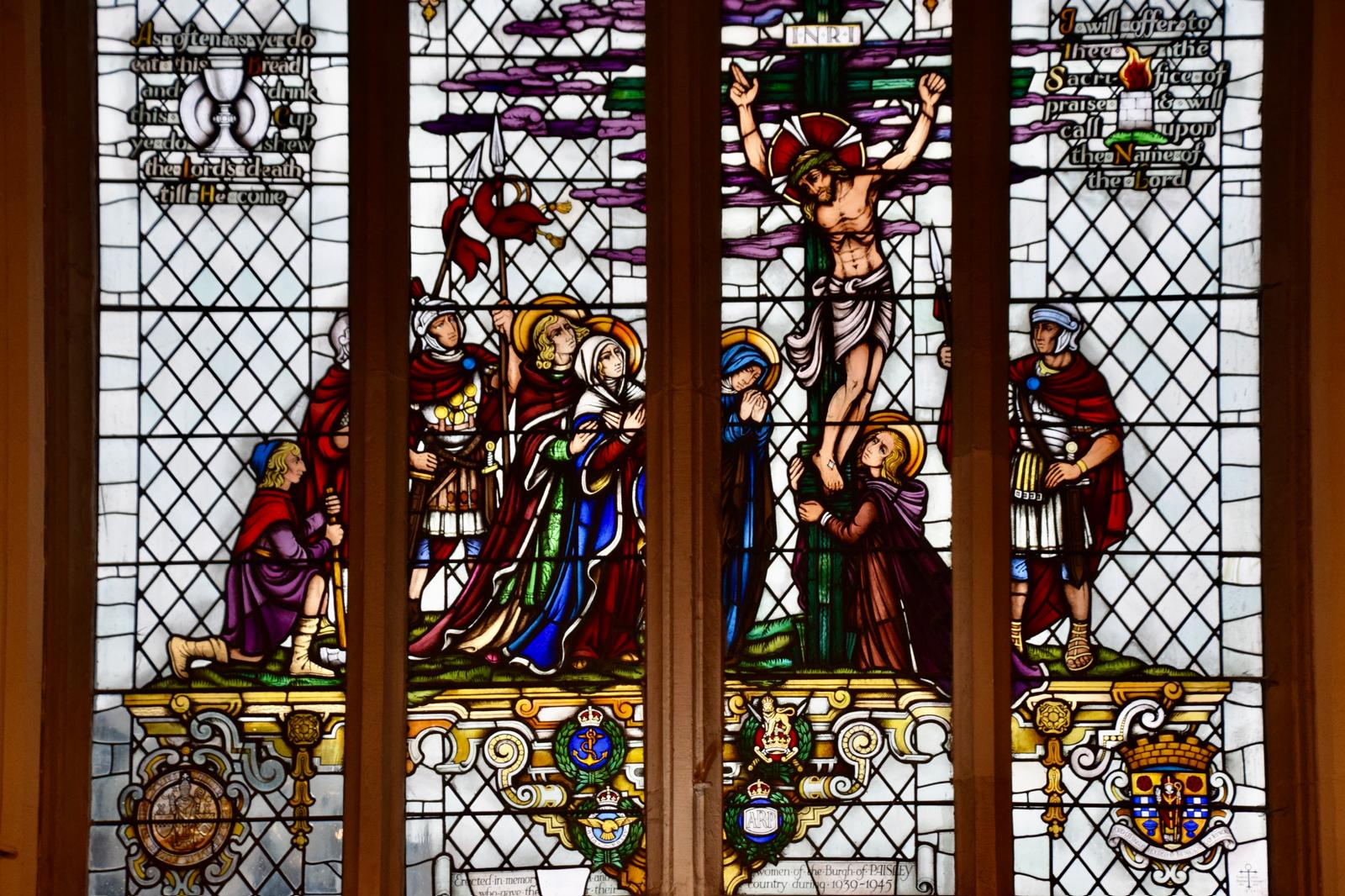
Paisley Abbey (detail)

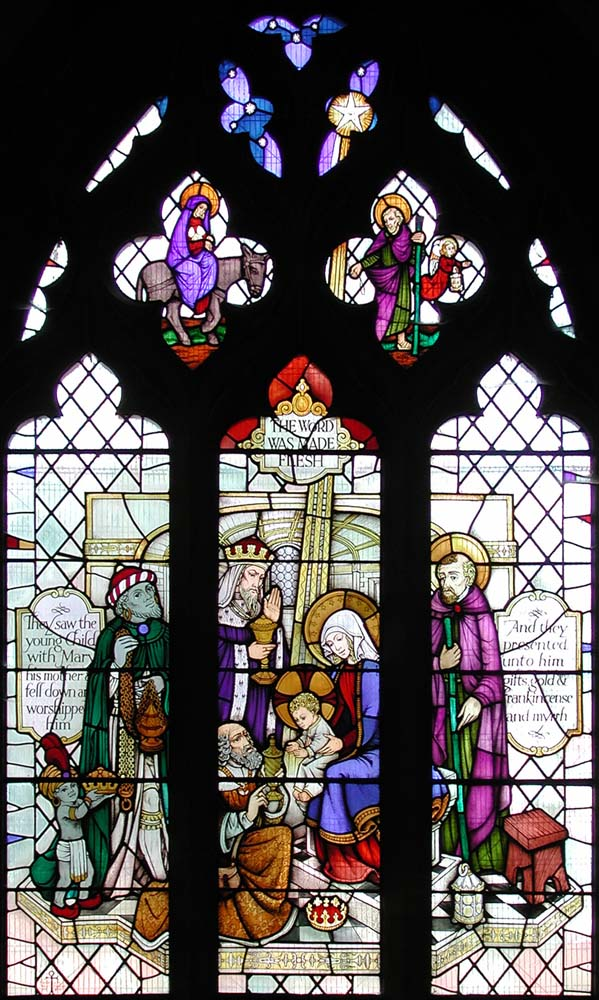
St Peter & St Paul, Harlington

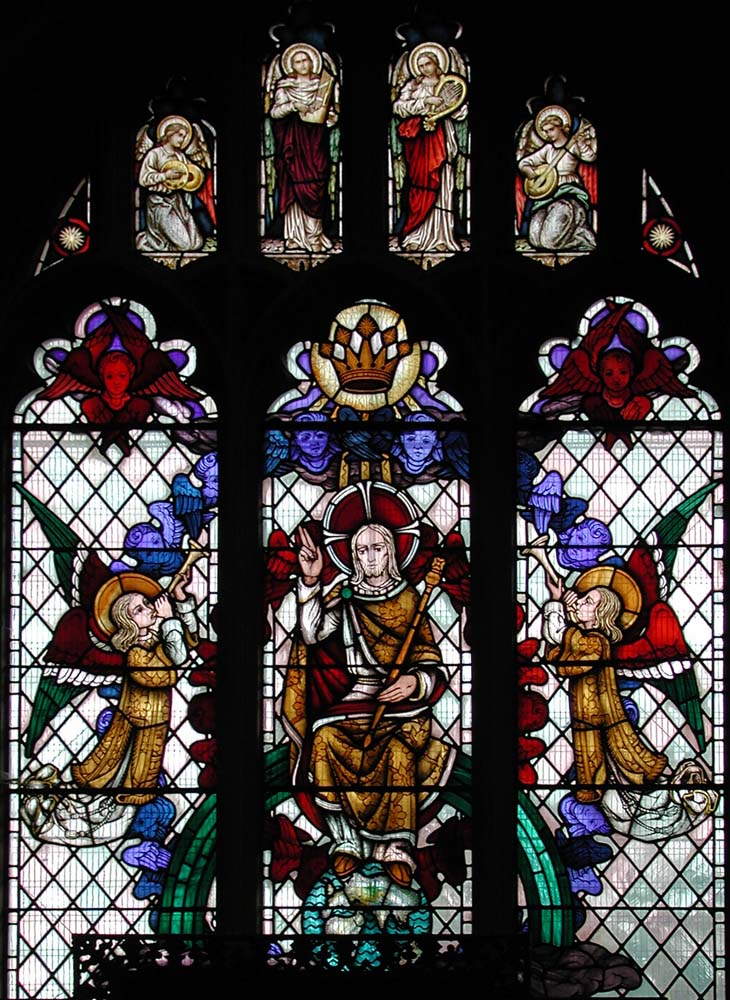
St Mary, Hayes

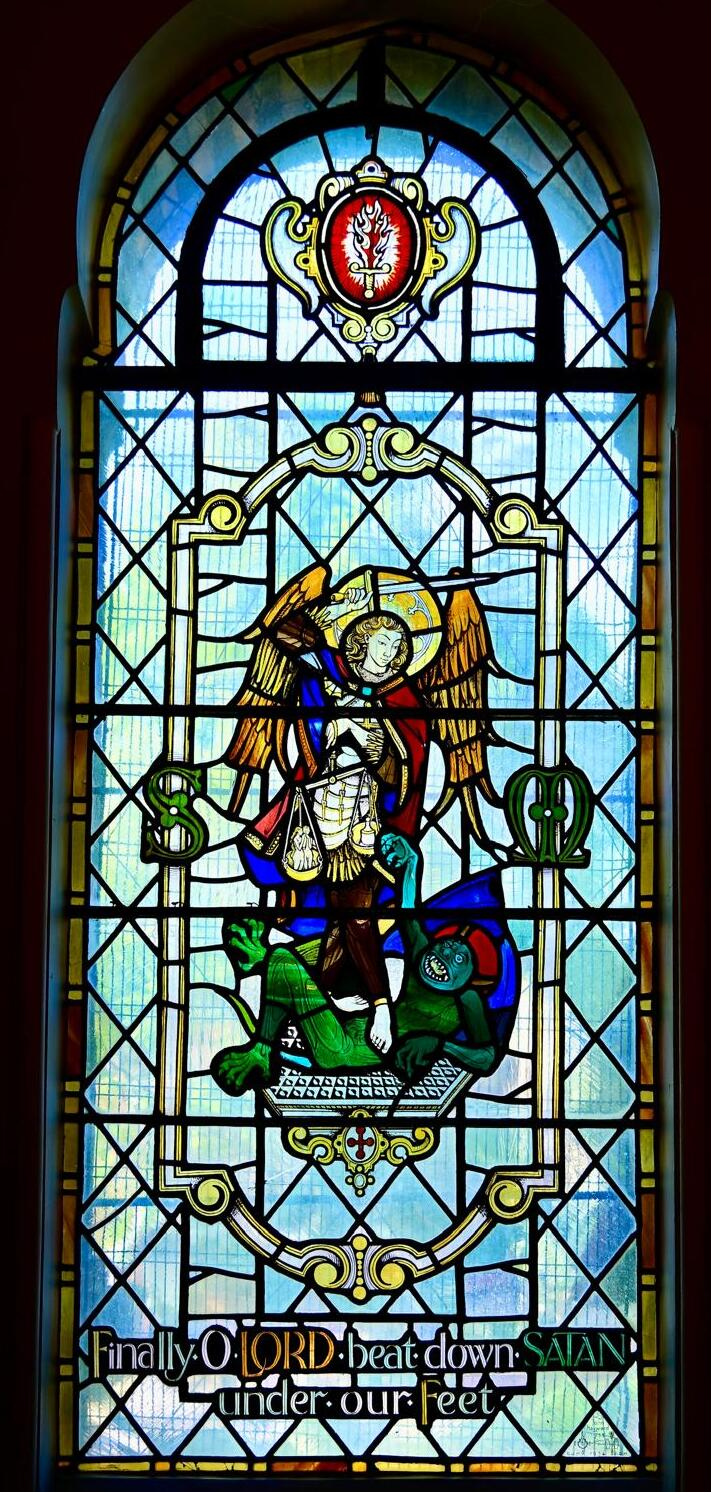
Christ Church, Streatham

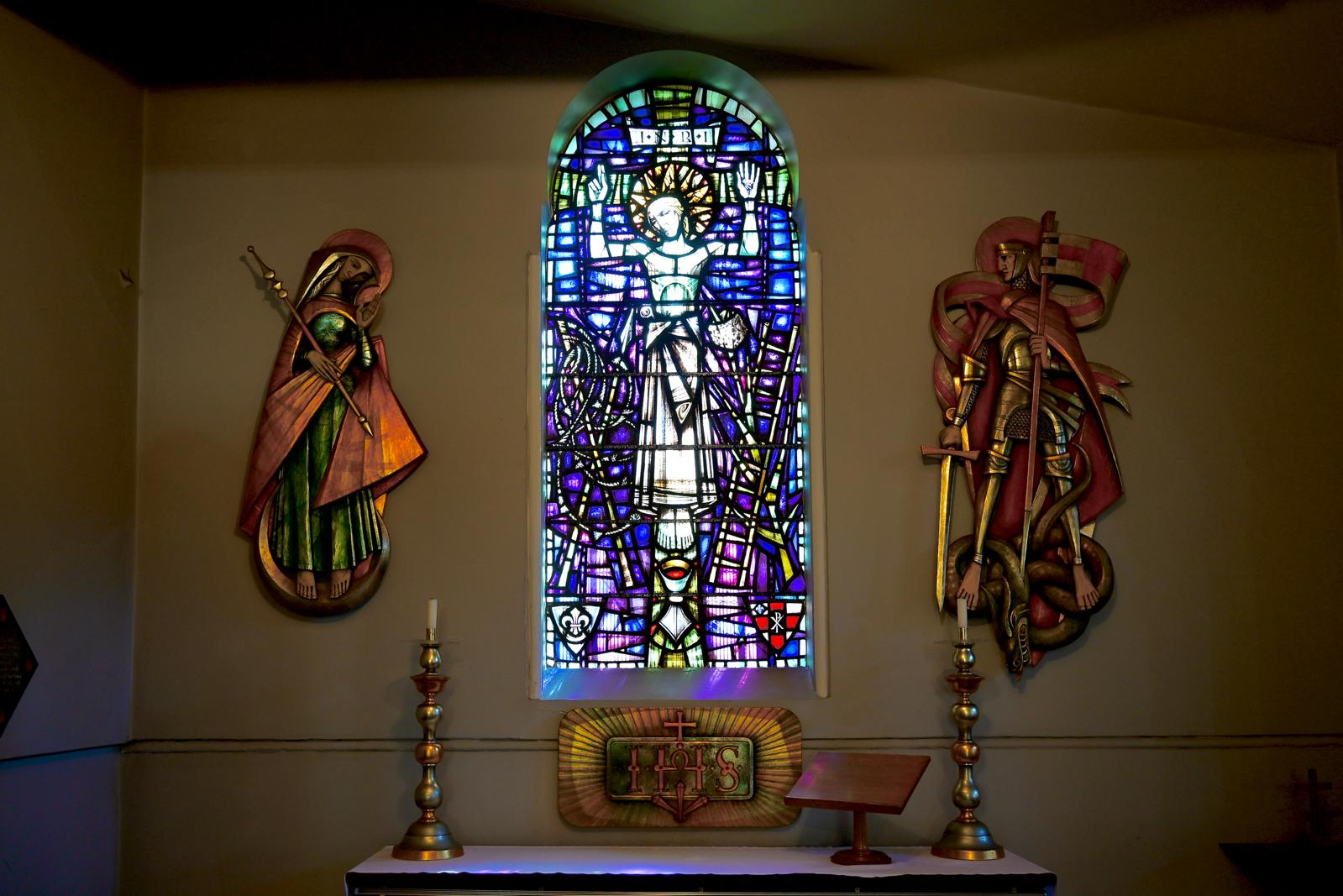
Christ Church, Streatham

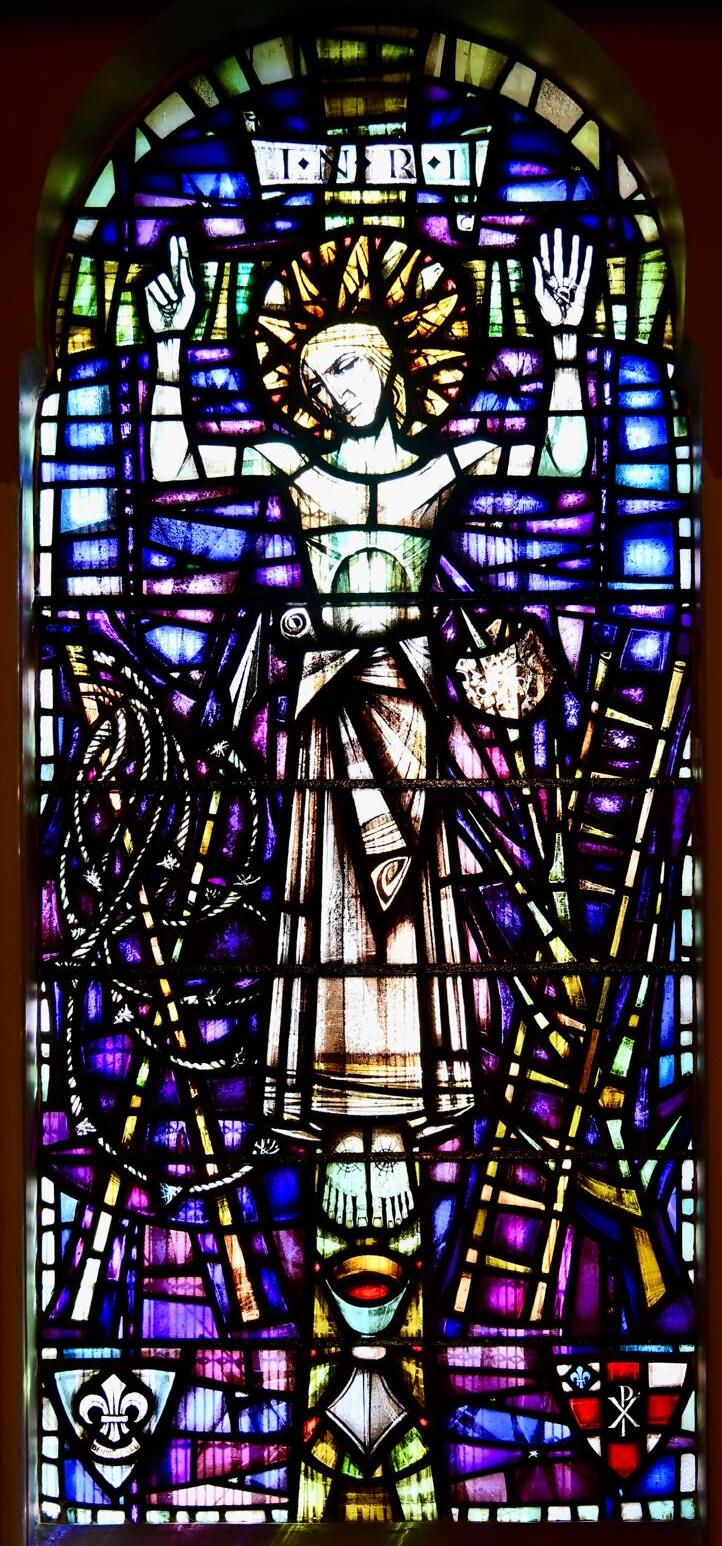
Christ Church, Streatham

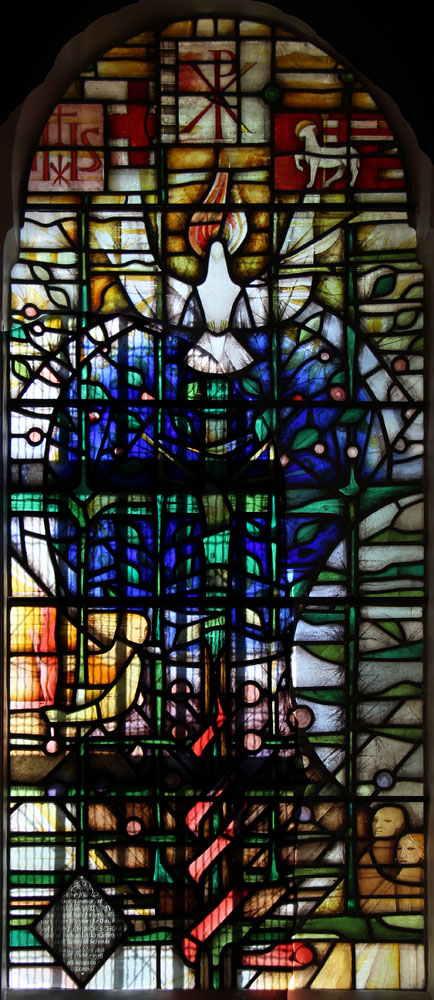
Christ Church, Streatham

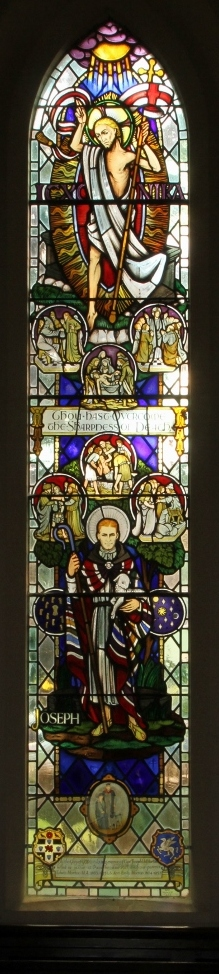
St James, Aston

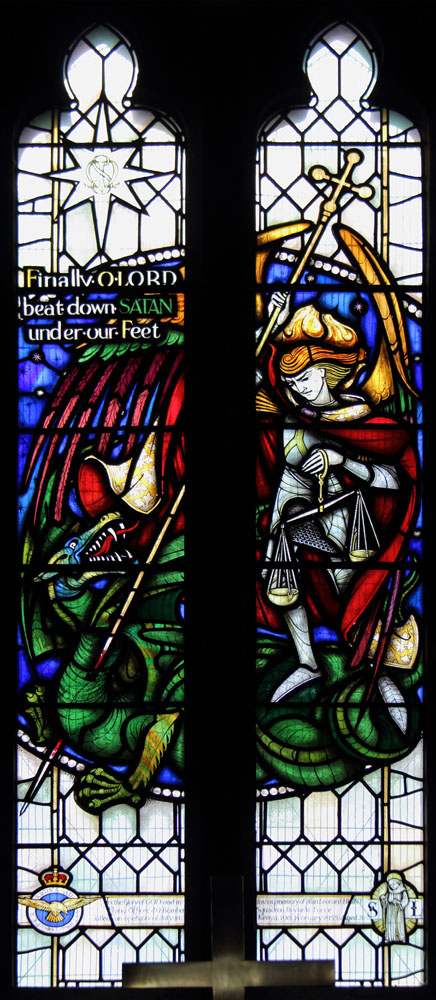
St Leonard, Sandridge

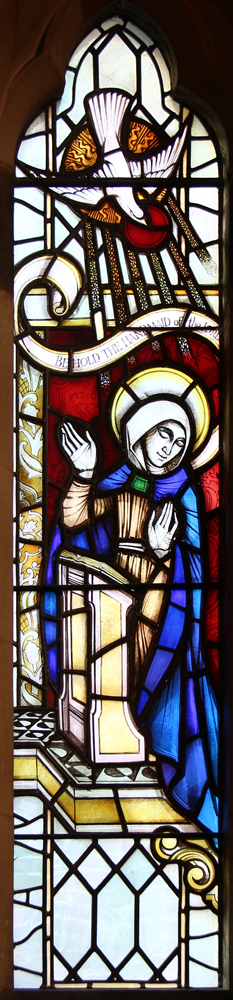
Chapel of the House of St Barnabas, Soho

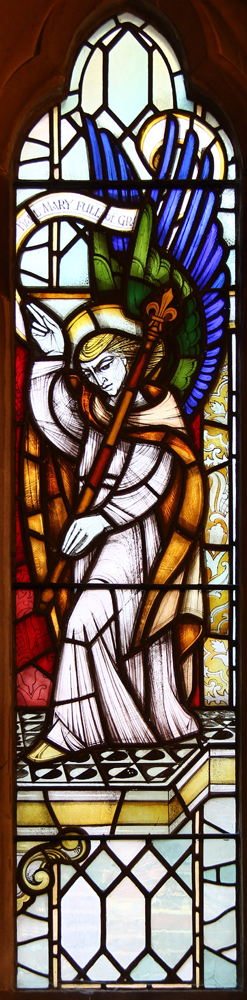
Chapel of the House of St Barnabas, Soho

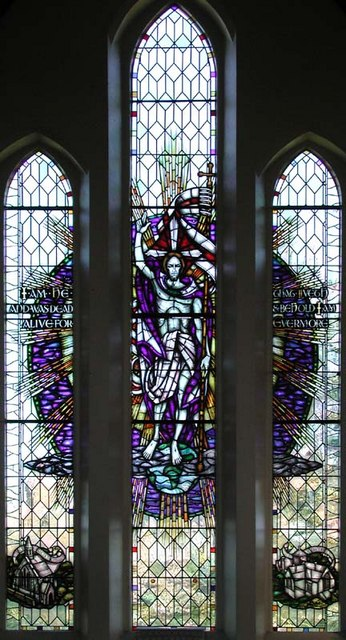
St Mary Magdalene, Flaunden

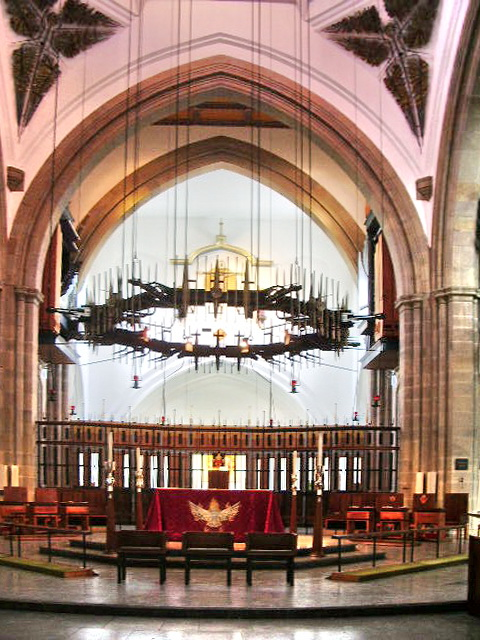
Blackburn Cathedral, Sanctuary Corona

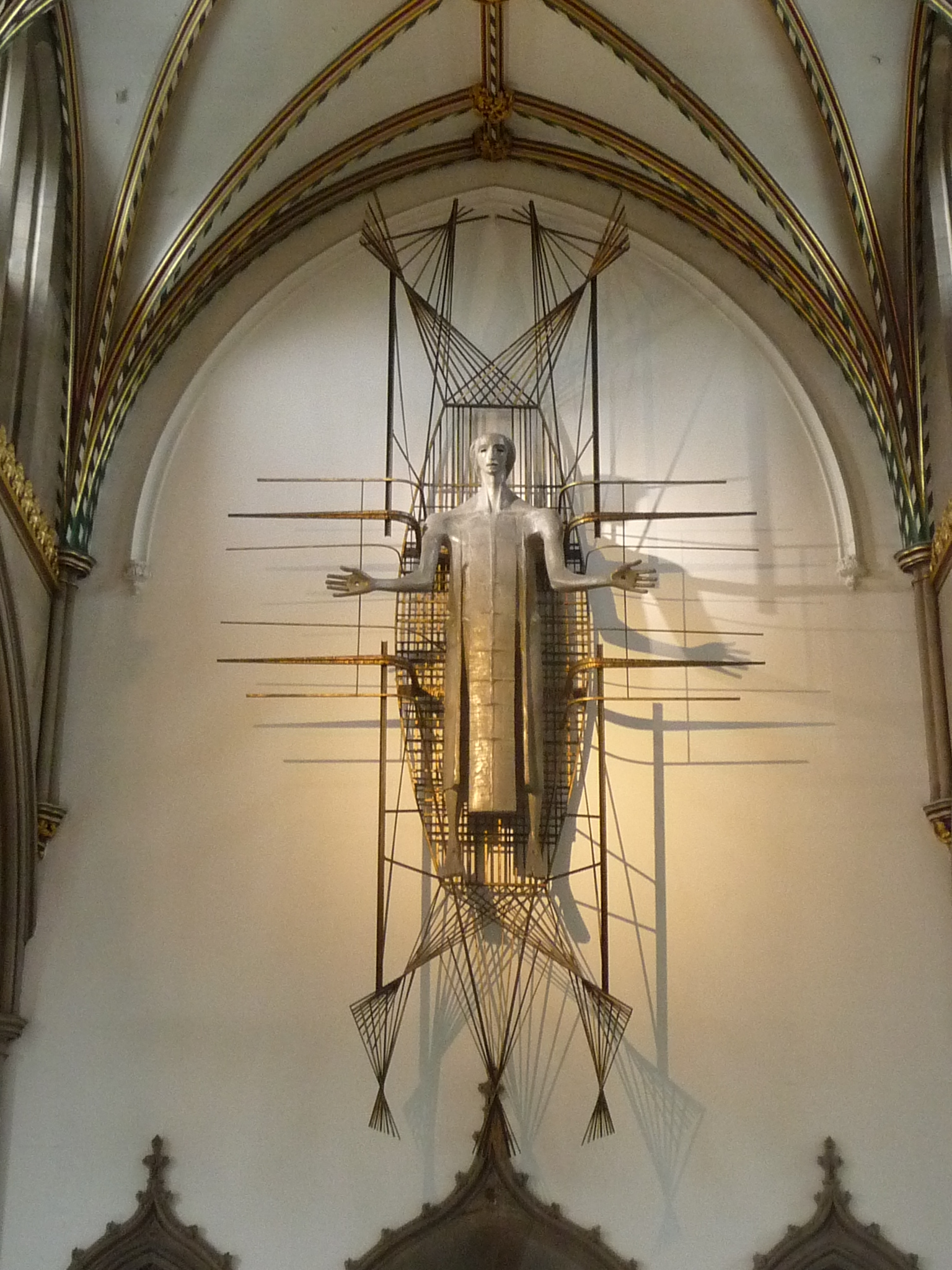
Blackburn Cathedral, Christ the Worker sculpture

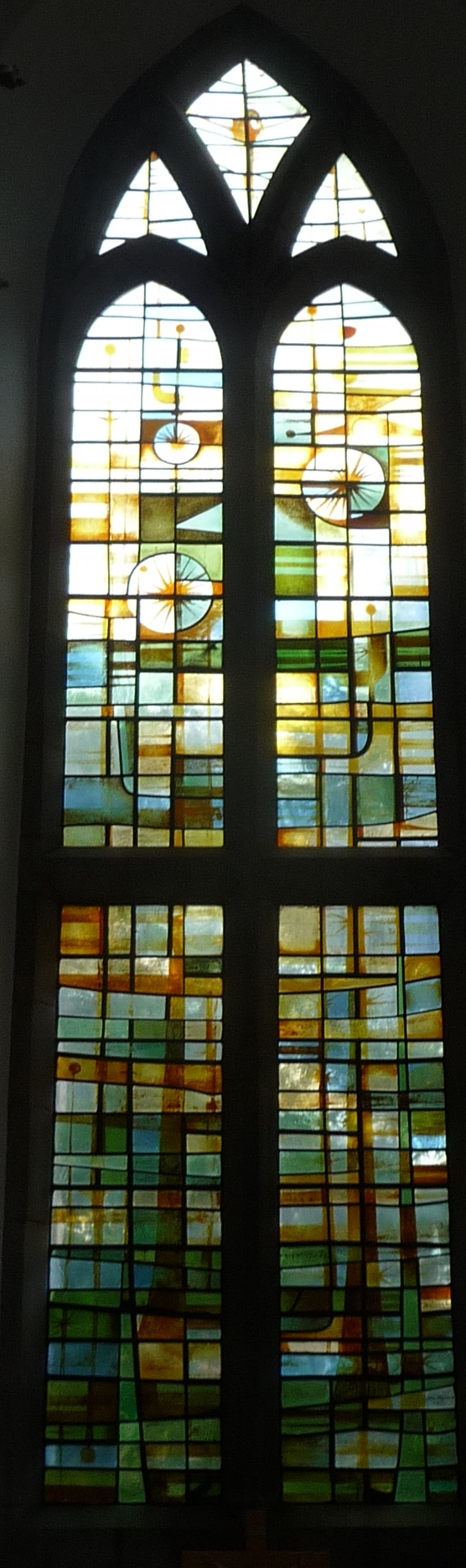
Blackburn Cathedral, St Martin's Chapel window

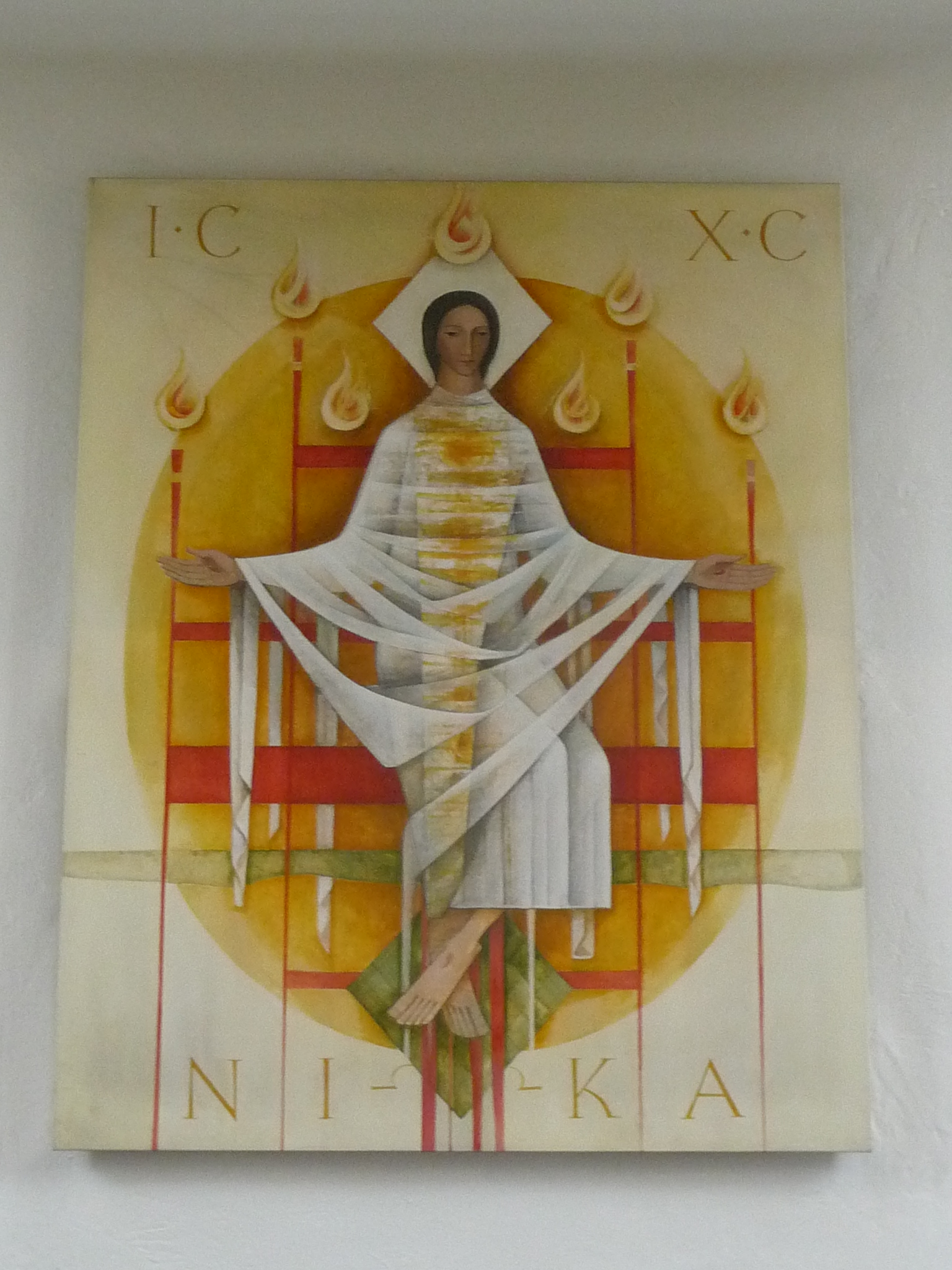
Blackburn Cathedral, Jesus Chapel, painted reredos

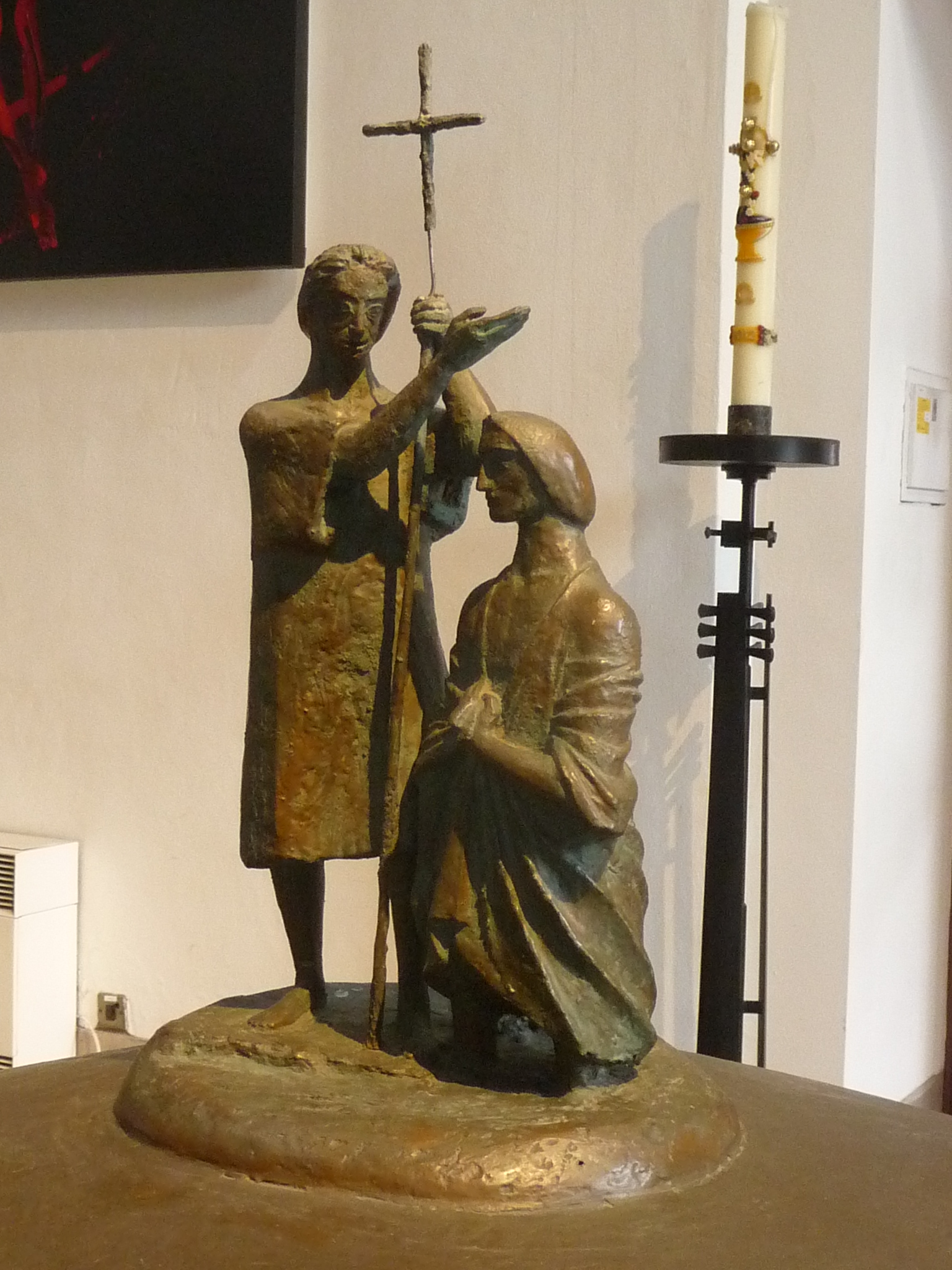
Blackburn Cathedral, font cover

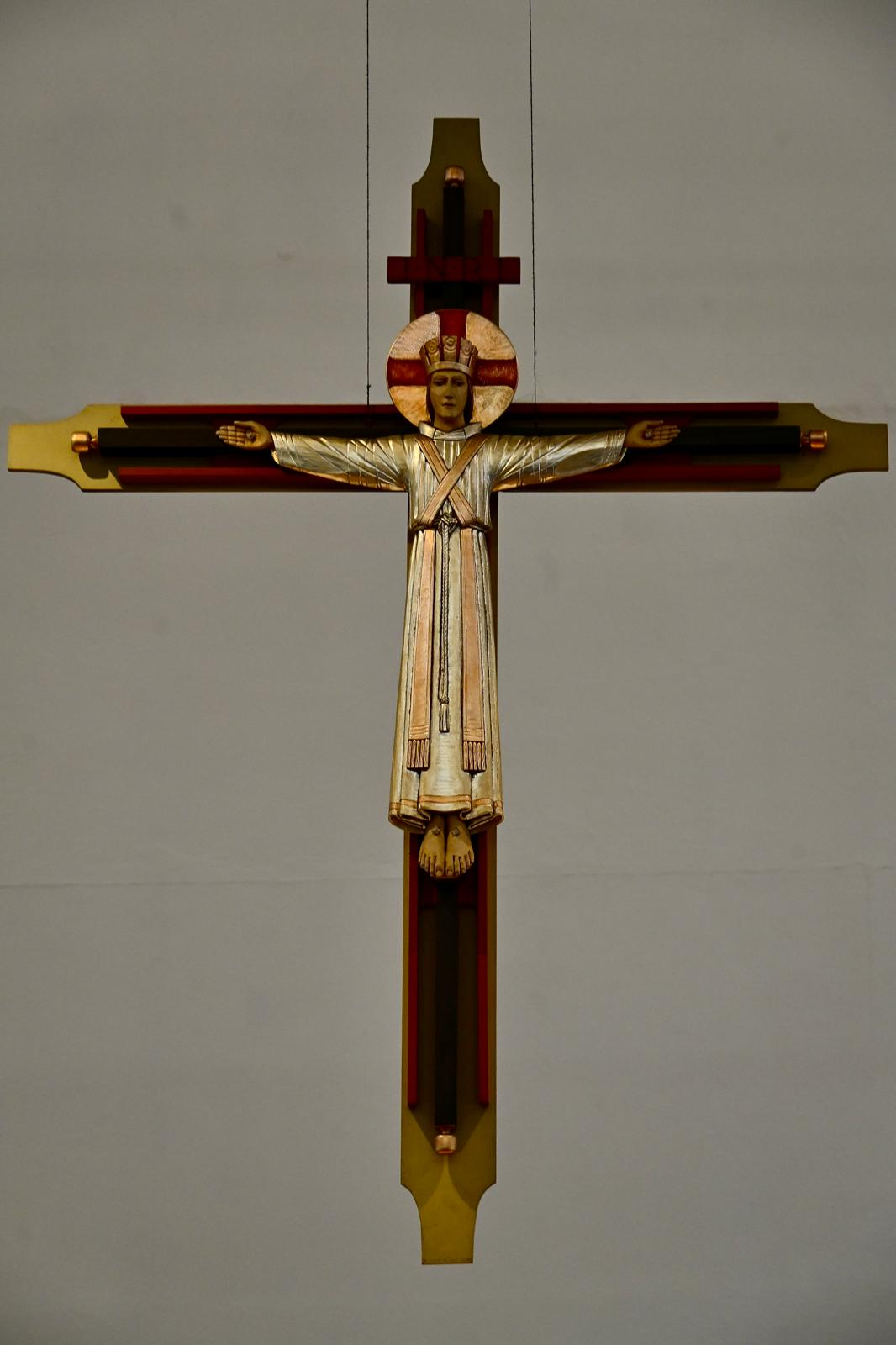
St Michael and All Angels, London Fields - Crucifix

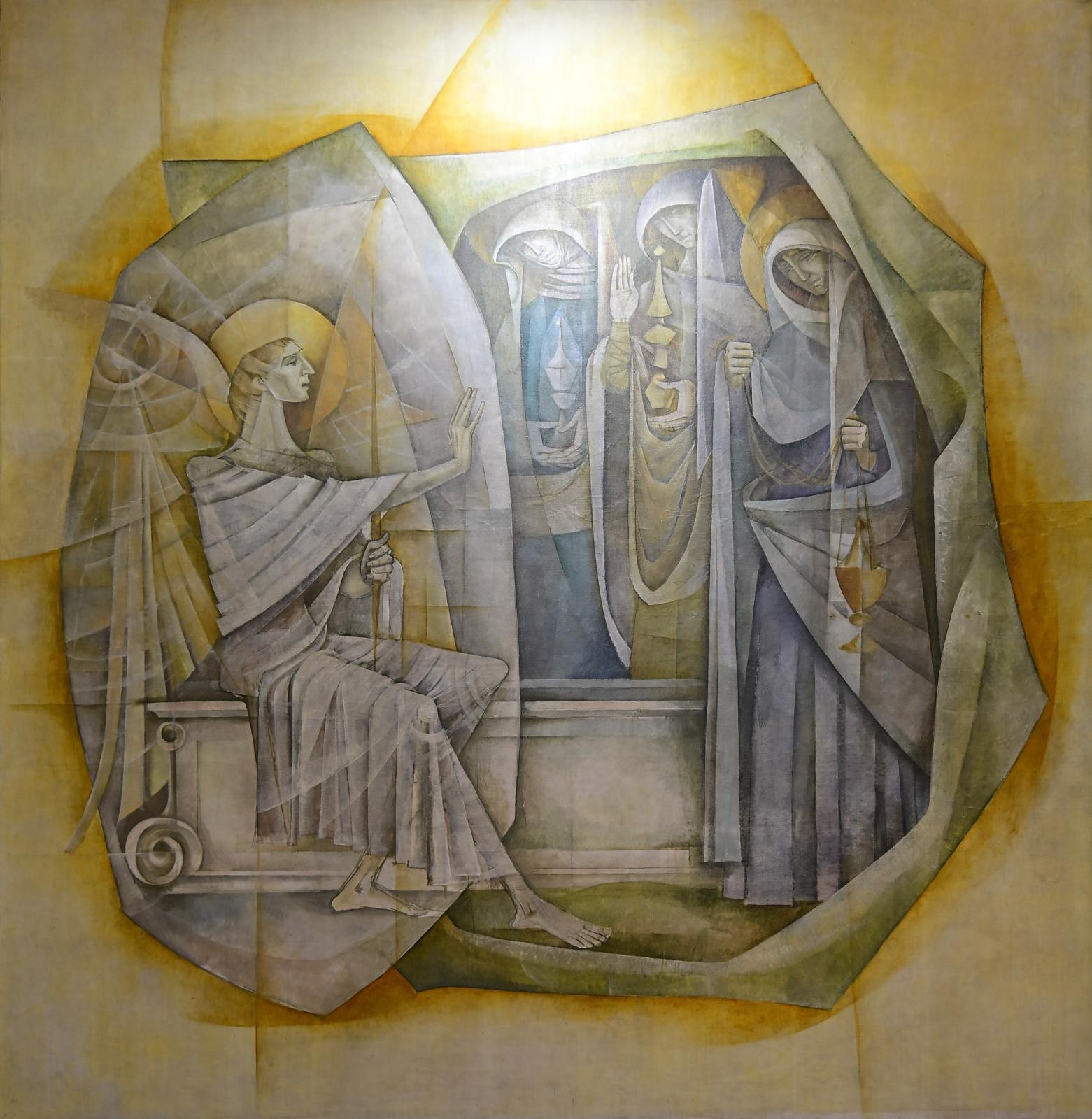
St Michael and All Angels, London Fields - The Empty Tomb

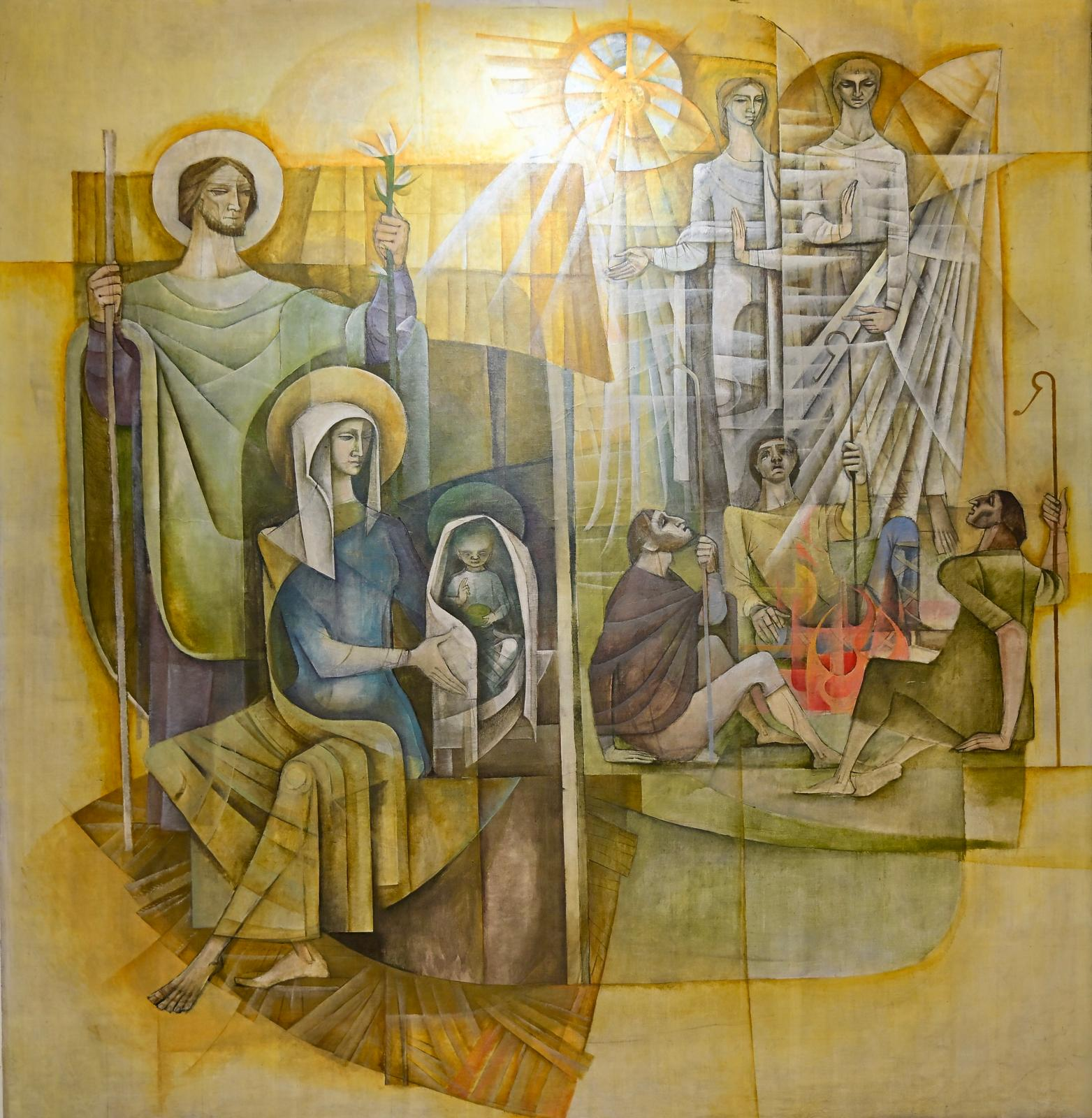
St Michael and All Angels, London Fields - The Nativity

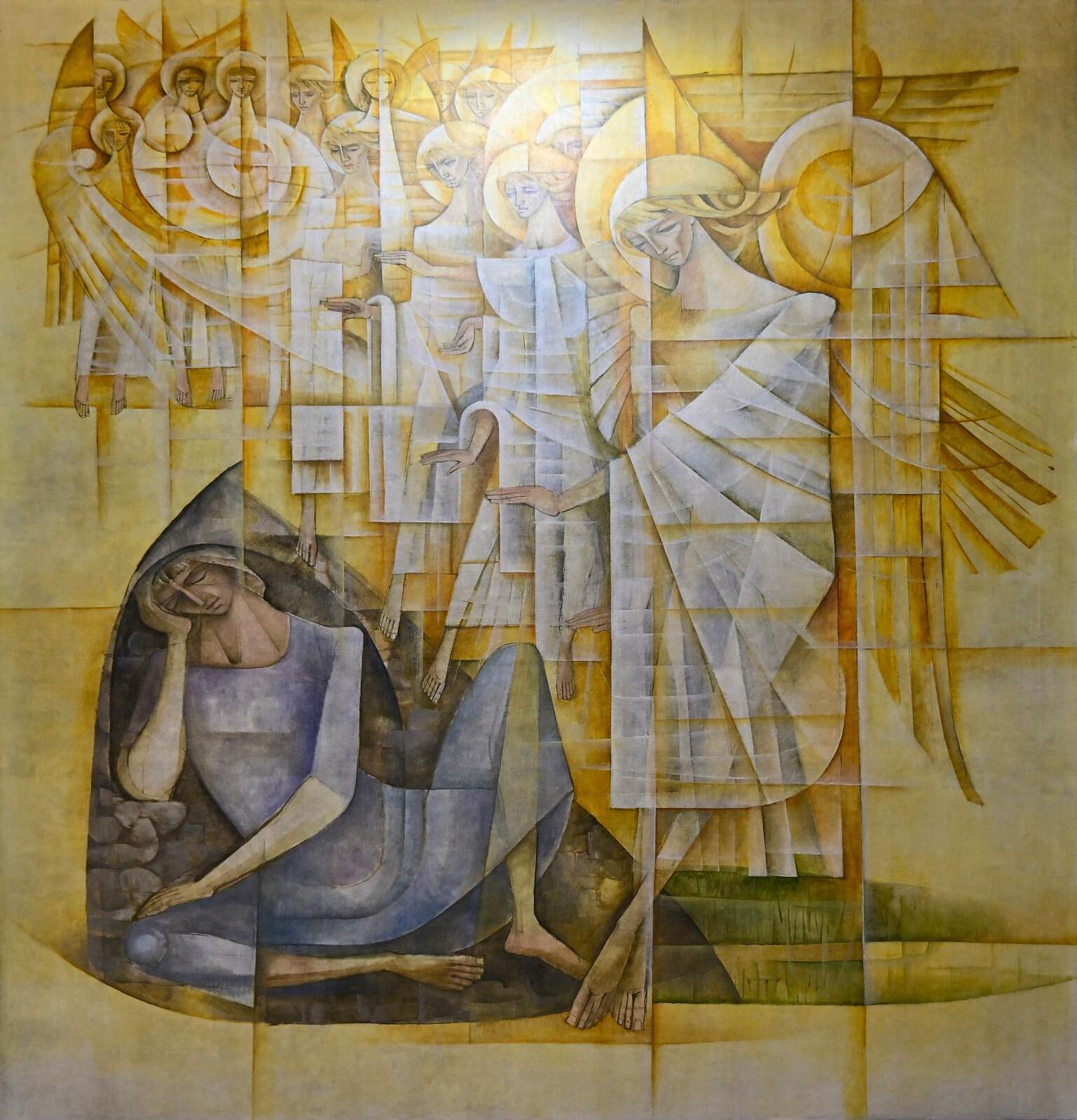
St Michael and All Angels, London Fields - Jacob's Ladder

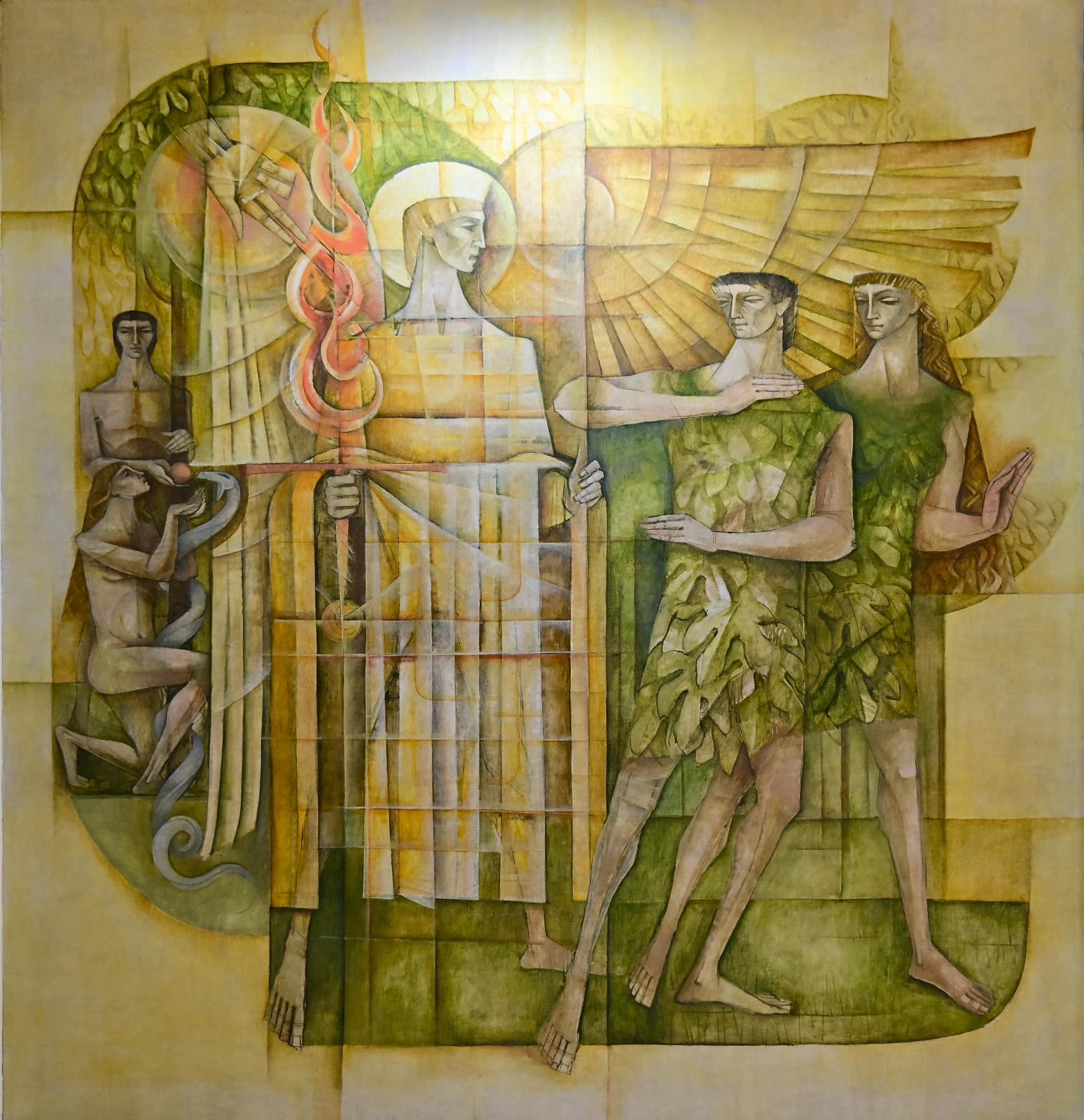
St Michael and All Angels, London Fields - Expulsion from the Garden of Eden

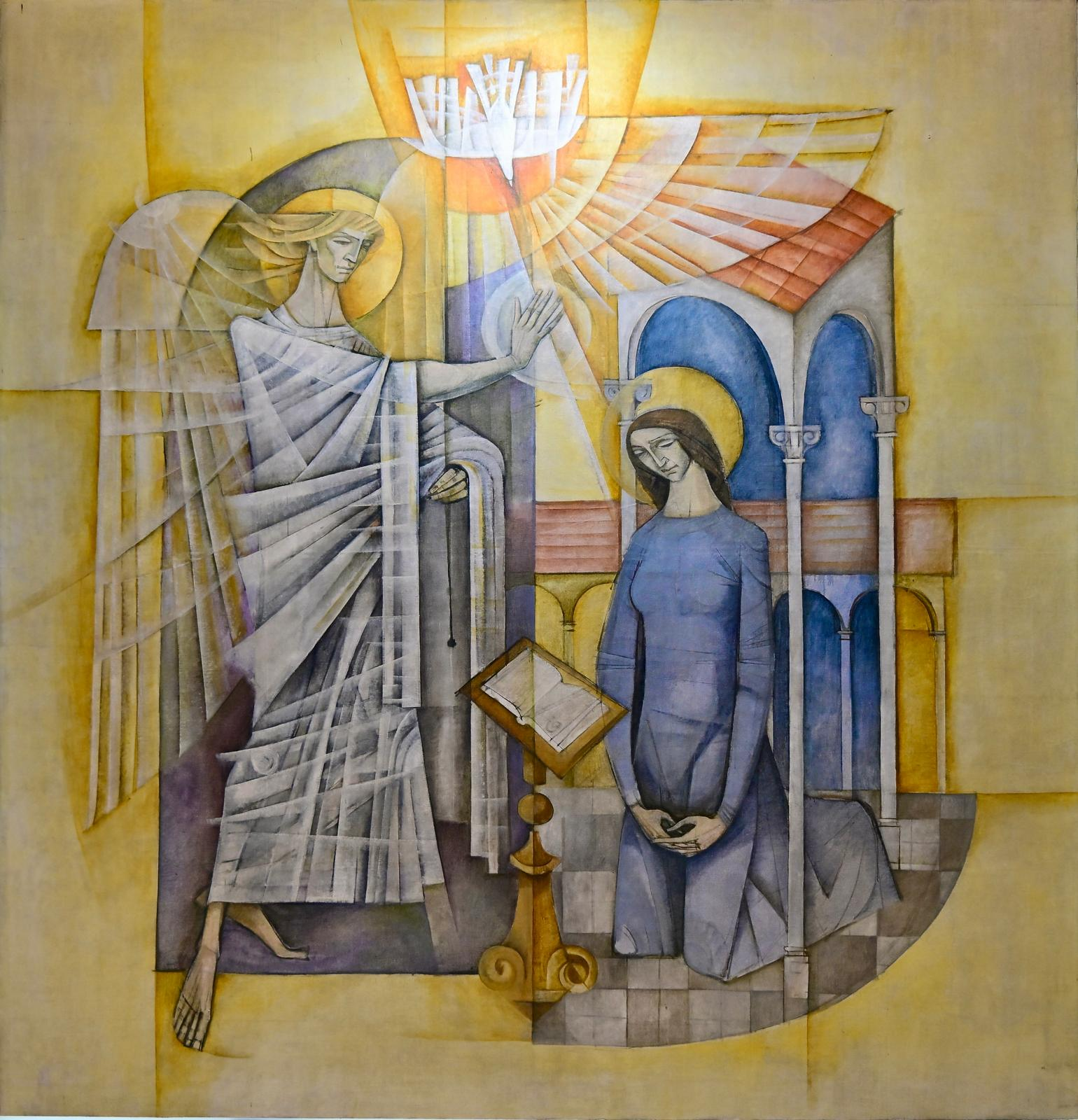
St Michael and All Angels, London Fields - The Annunciation

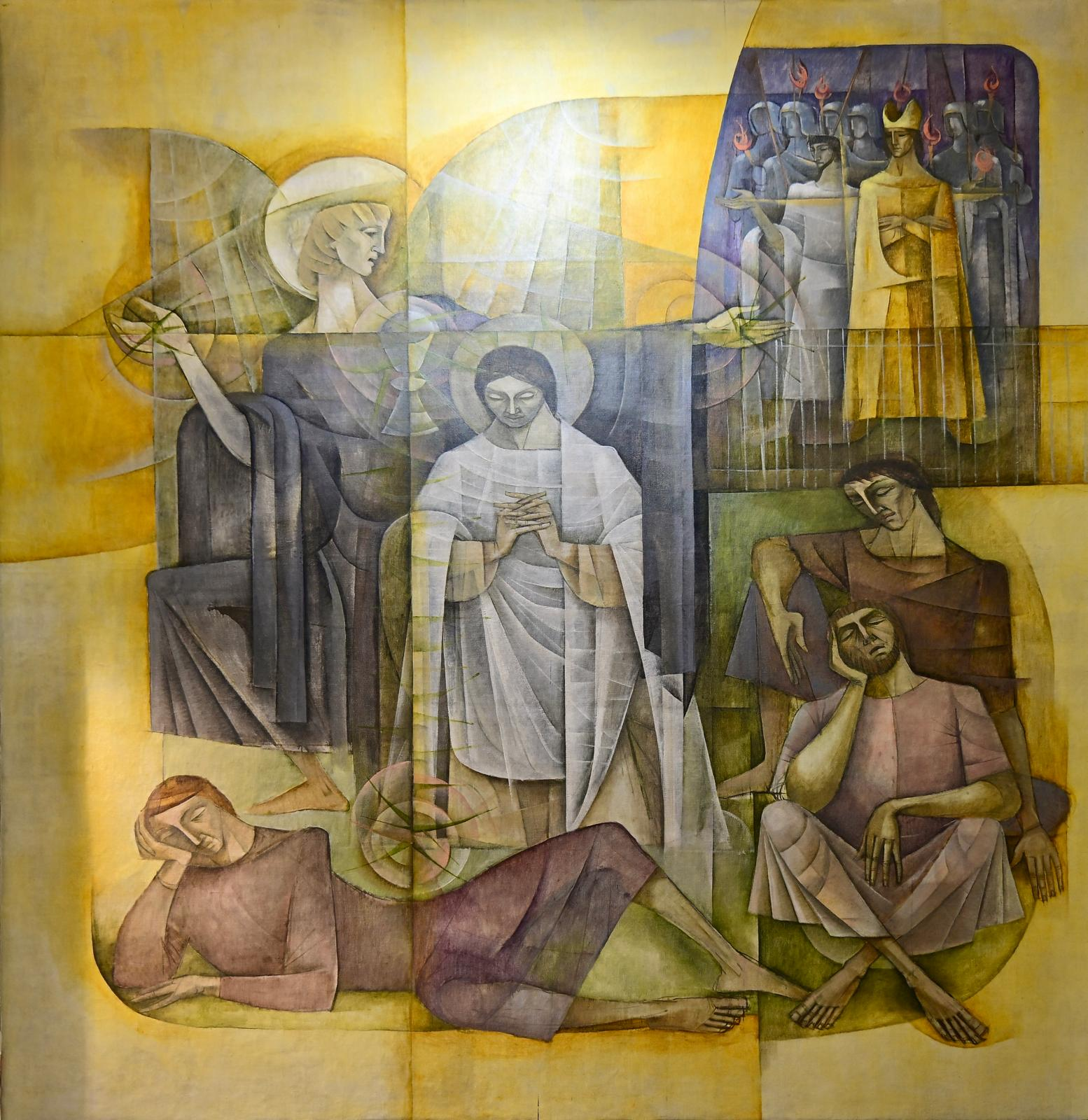
St Michael and All Angels, London Fields - The Agony in the Garden

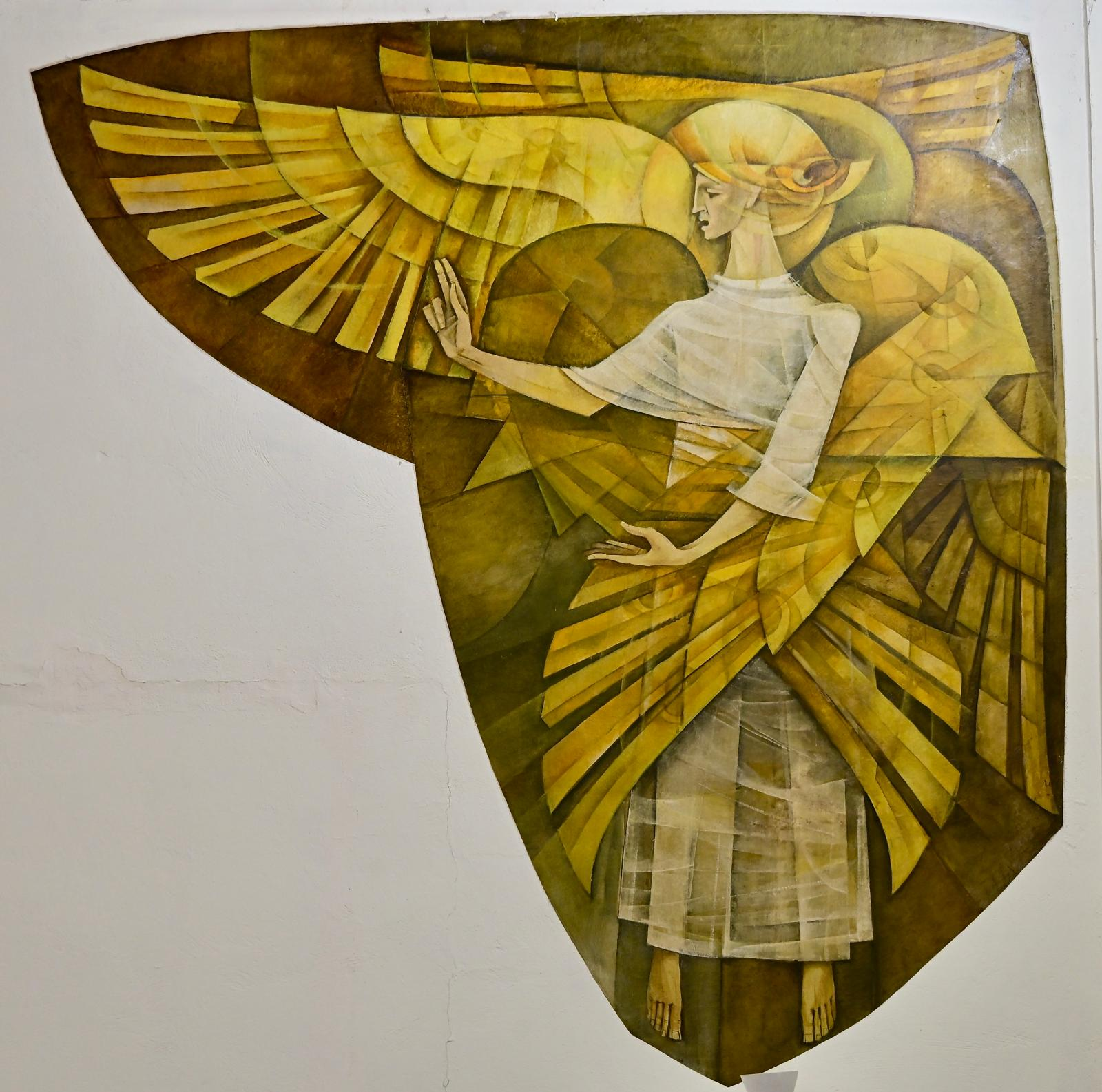
Angel St Michael and All Angels, London Fields - mural (north)

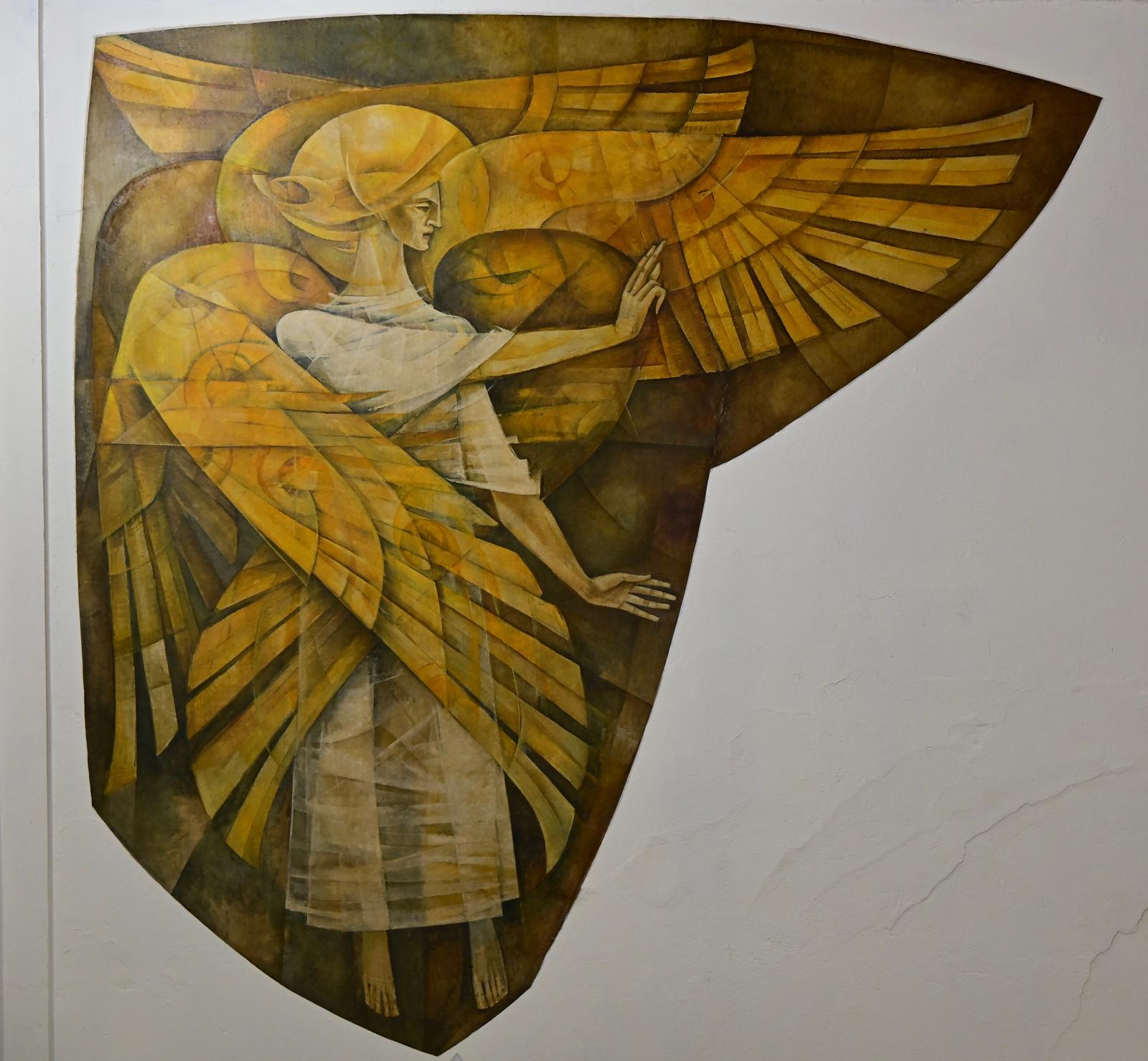
St Michael and All Angels, London Fields - Angel mural (south)

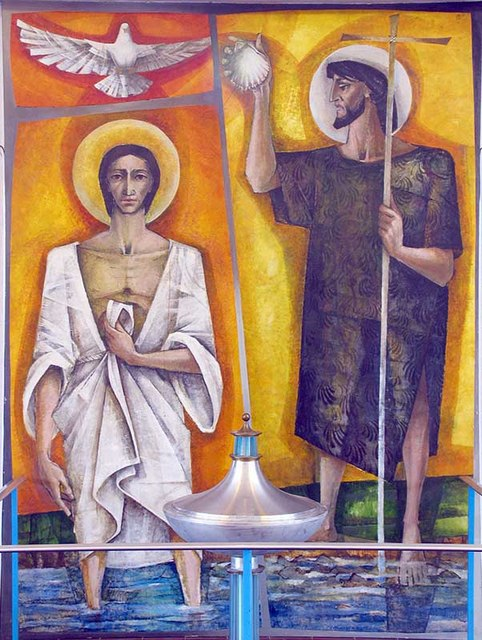
St Michael and All Angels, London Fields - Baptism mural

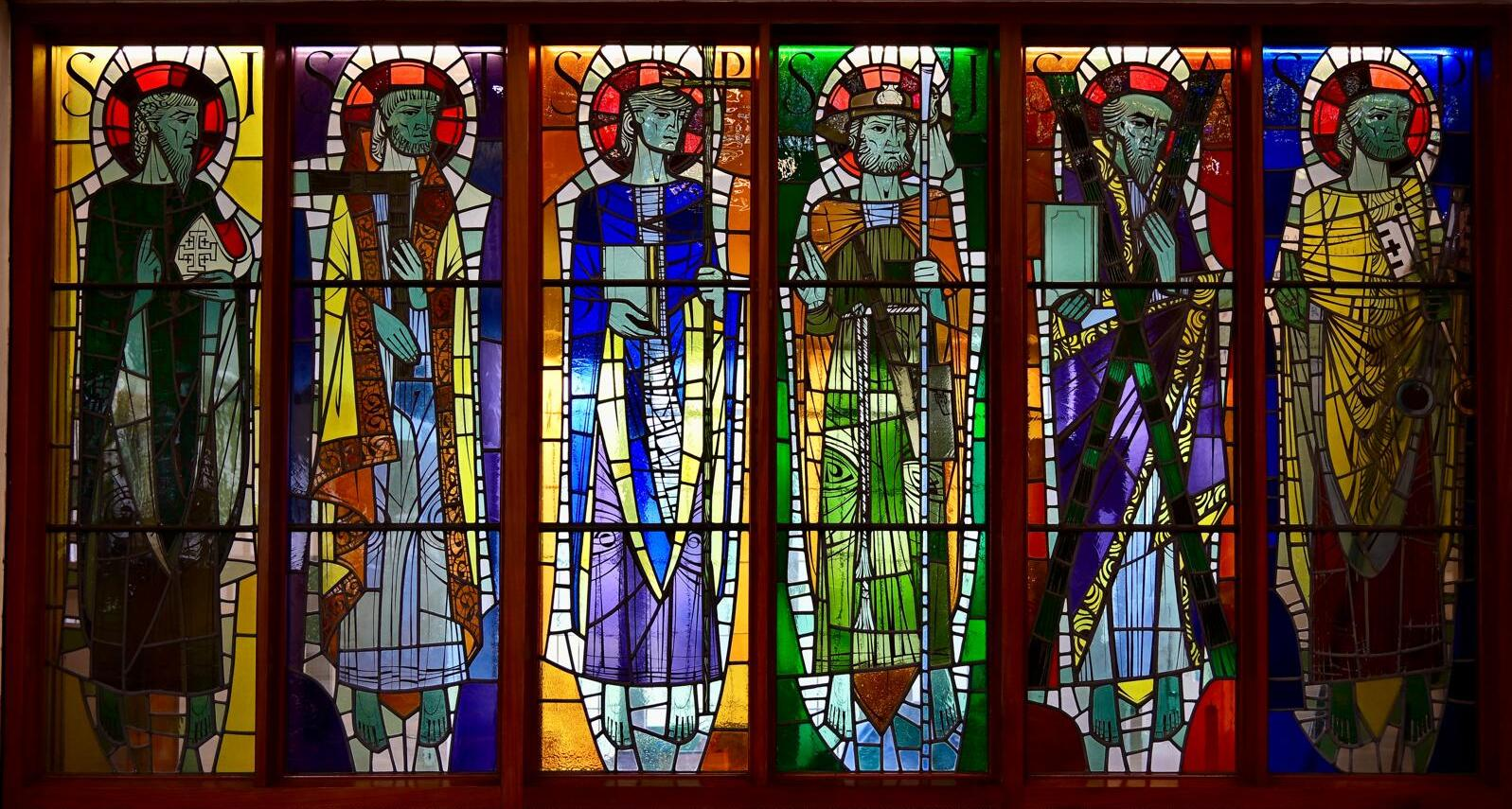
St Michael and All Angels, London Fields - Apostles screen (north)

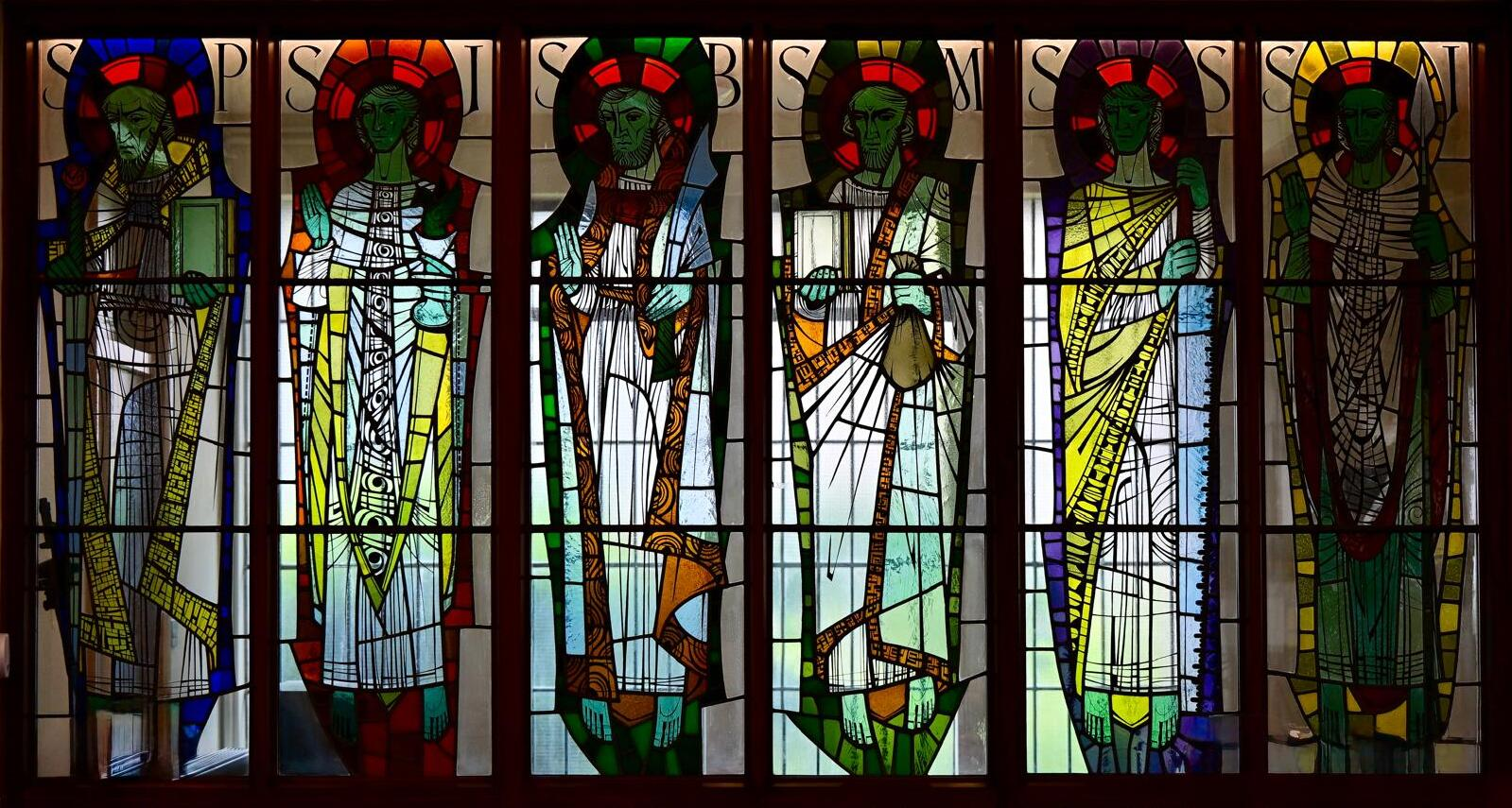
St Michael and All Angels, London Fields - Apostles screen (south)

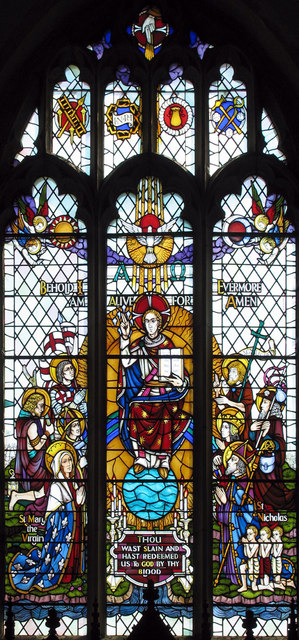
St Nicholas, Pluckley

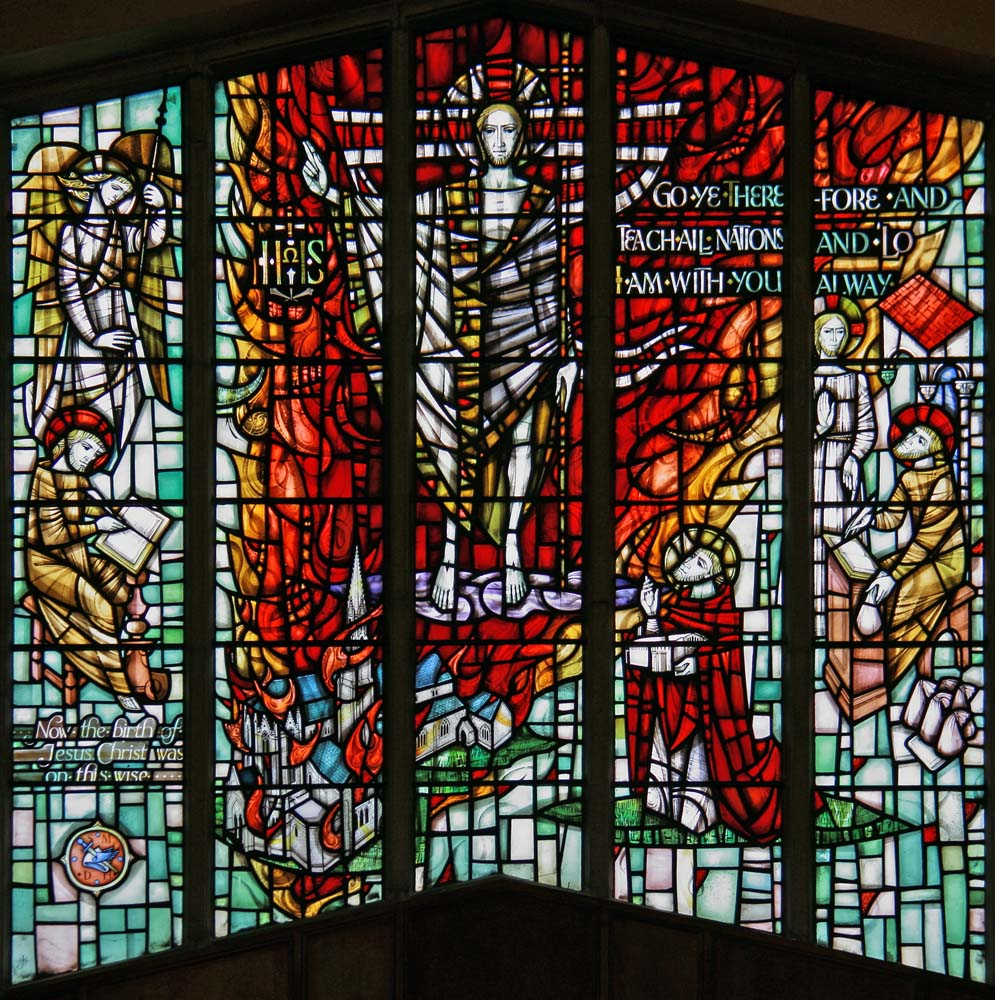
St Matthew, Camberwell

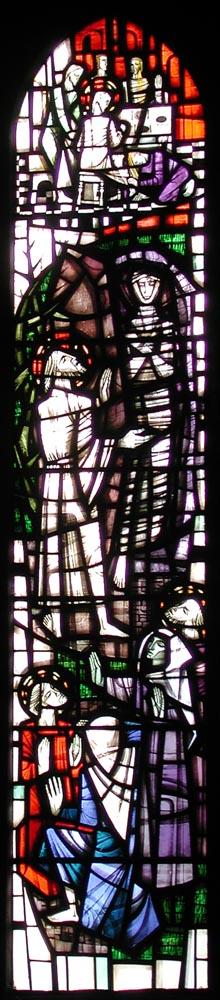
St Andrew, Willesden

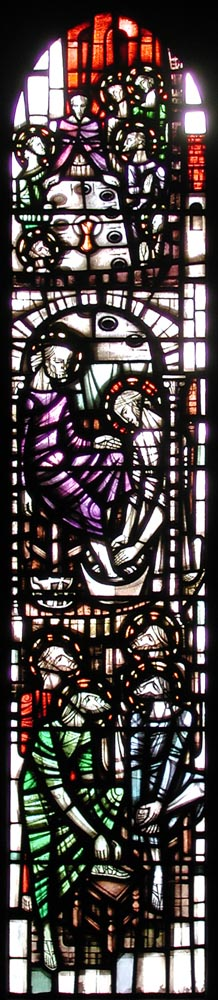
St Andrew, Willesden

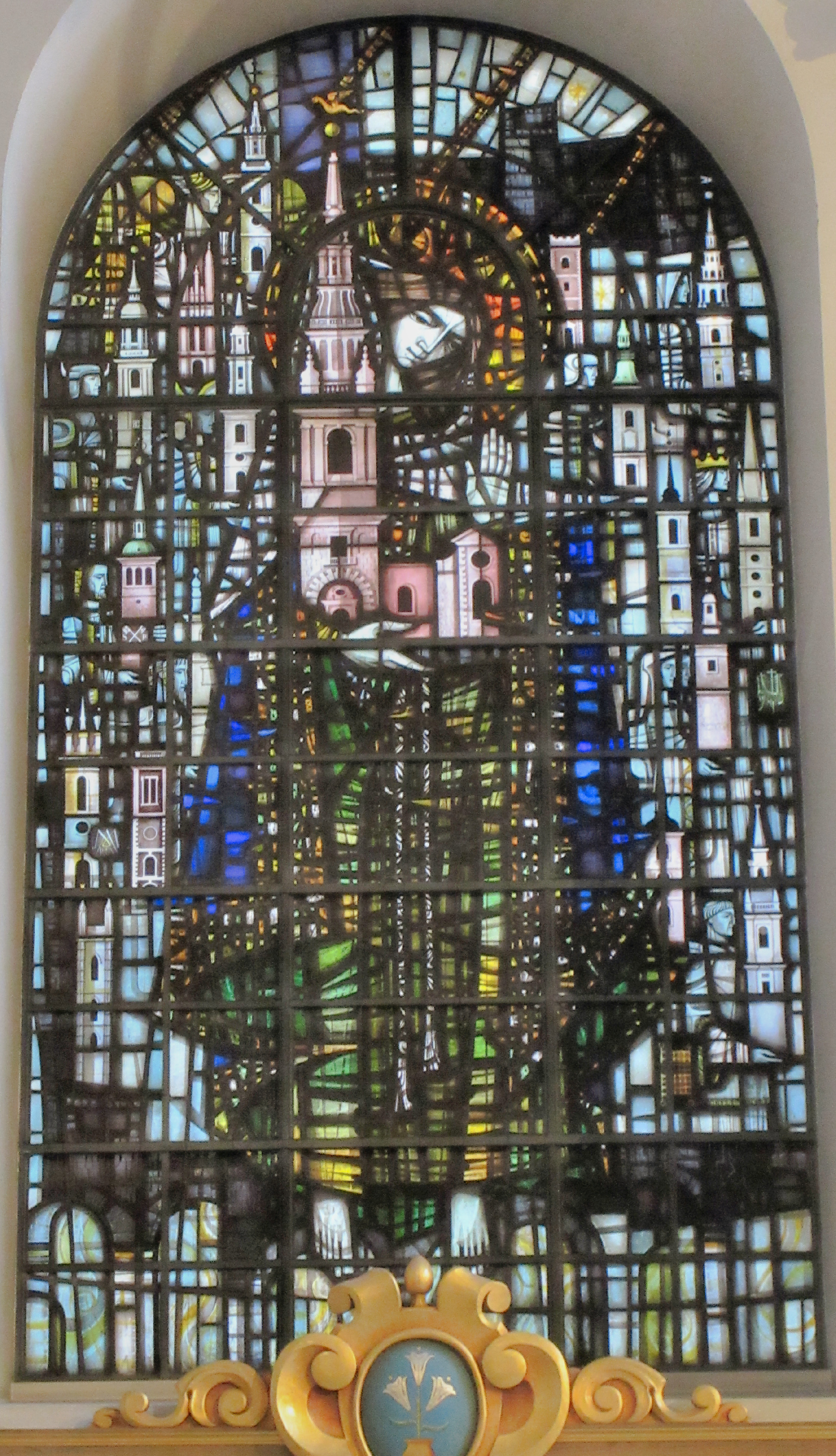
St Mary-le-Bow, City of London

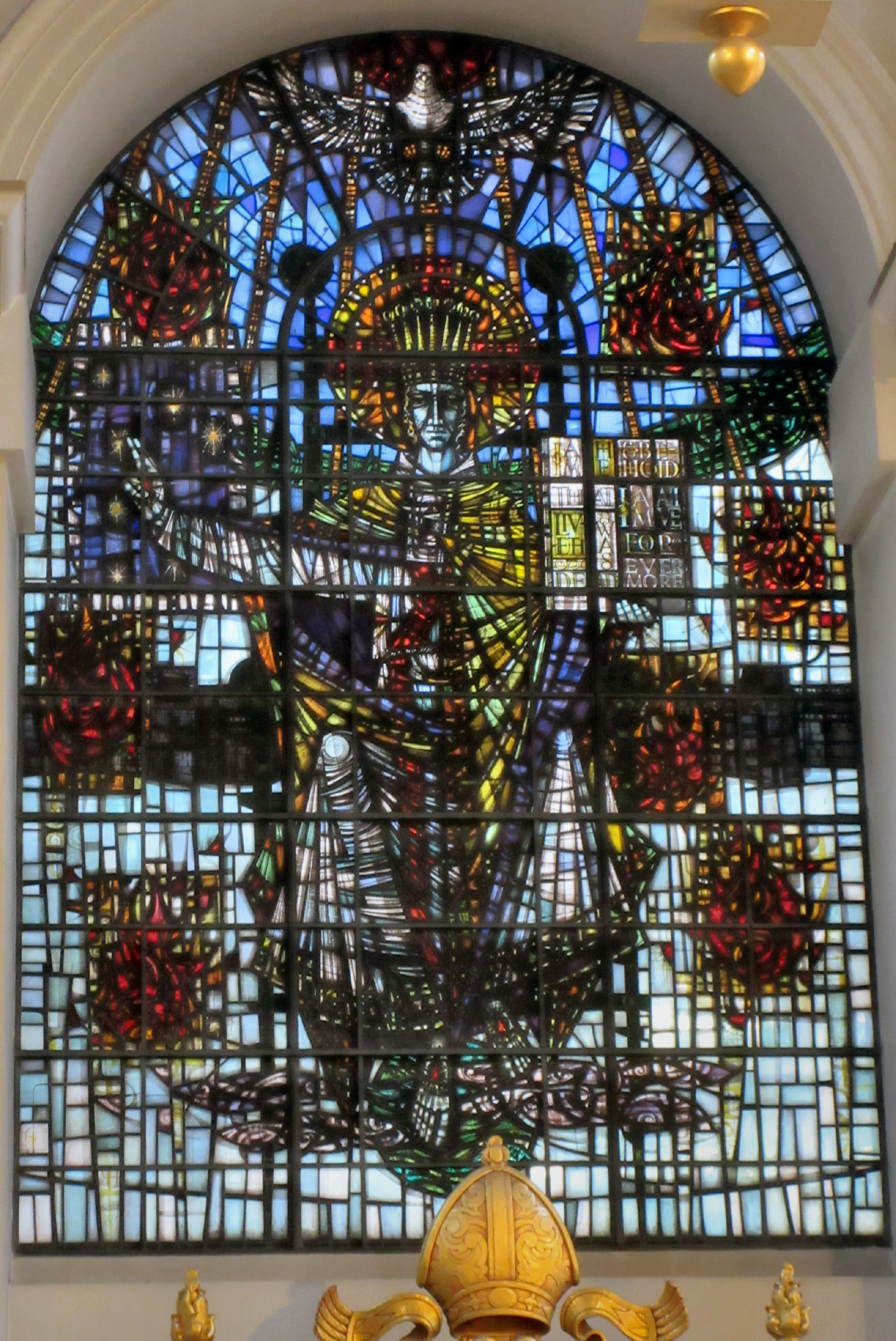
St Mary-le-Bow, City of London

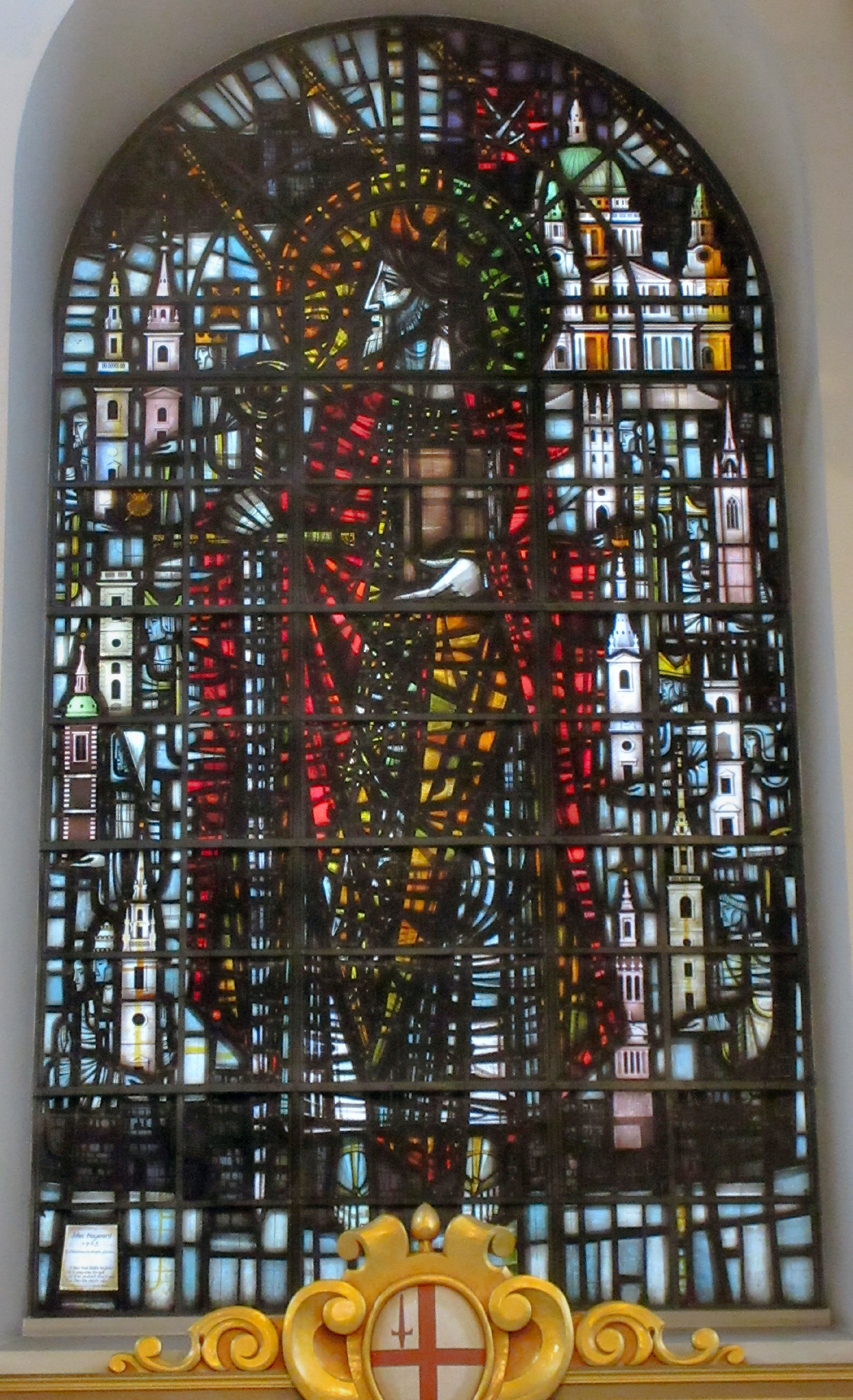
St Mary-le-Bow, City of London

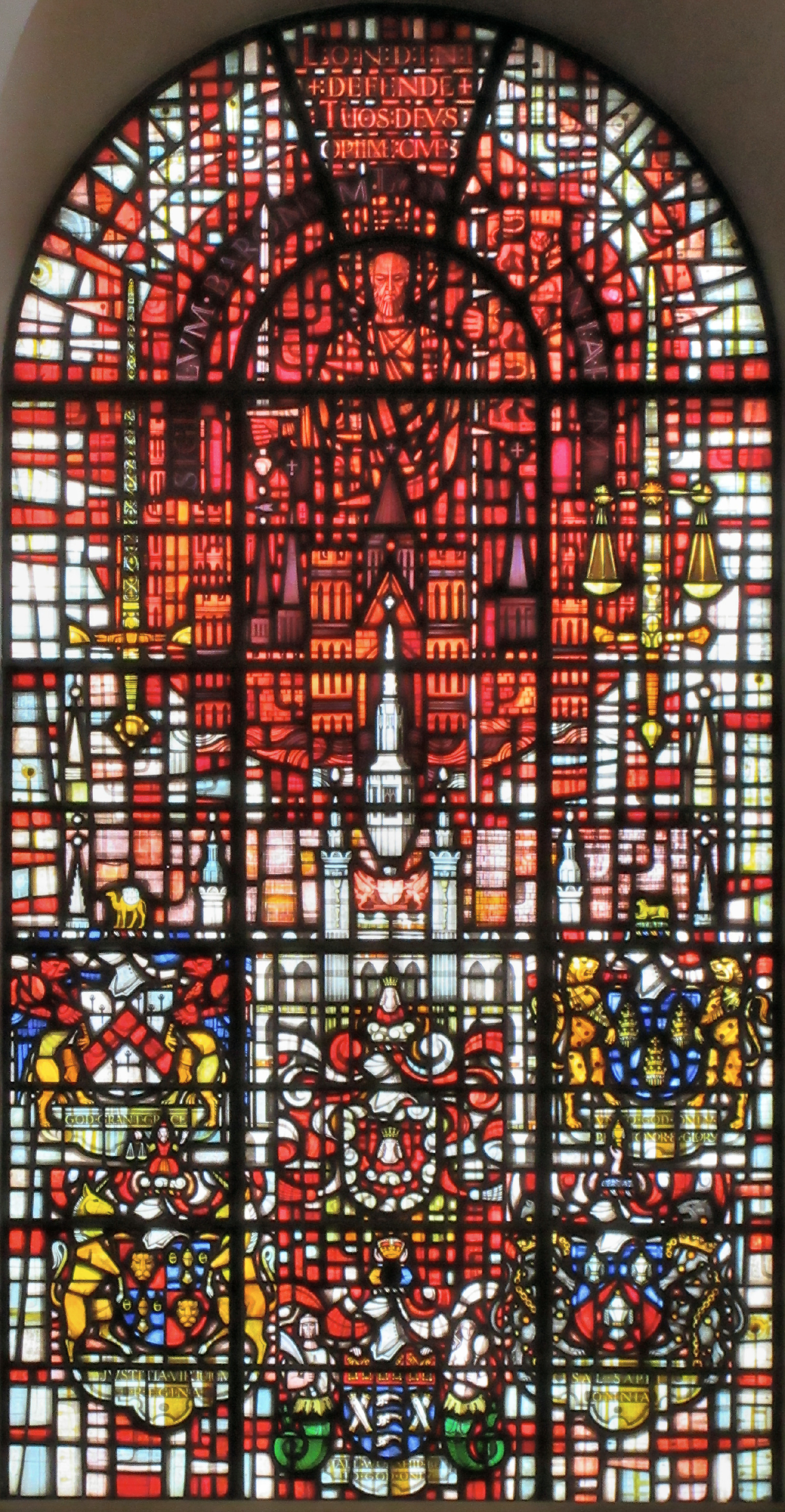
St Mary-le-Bow, City of London

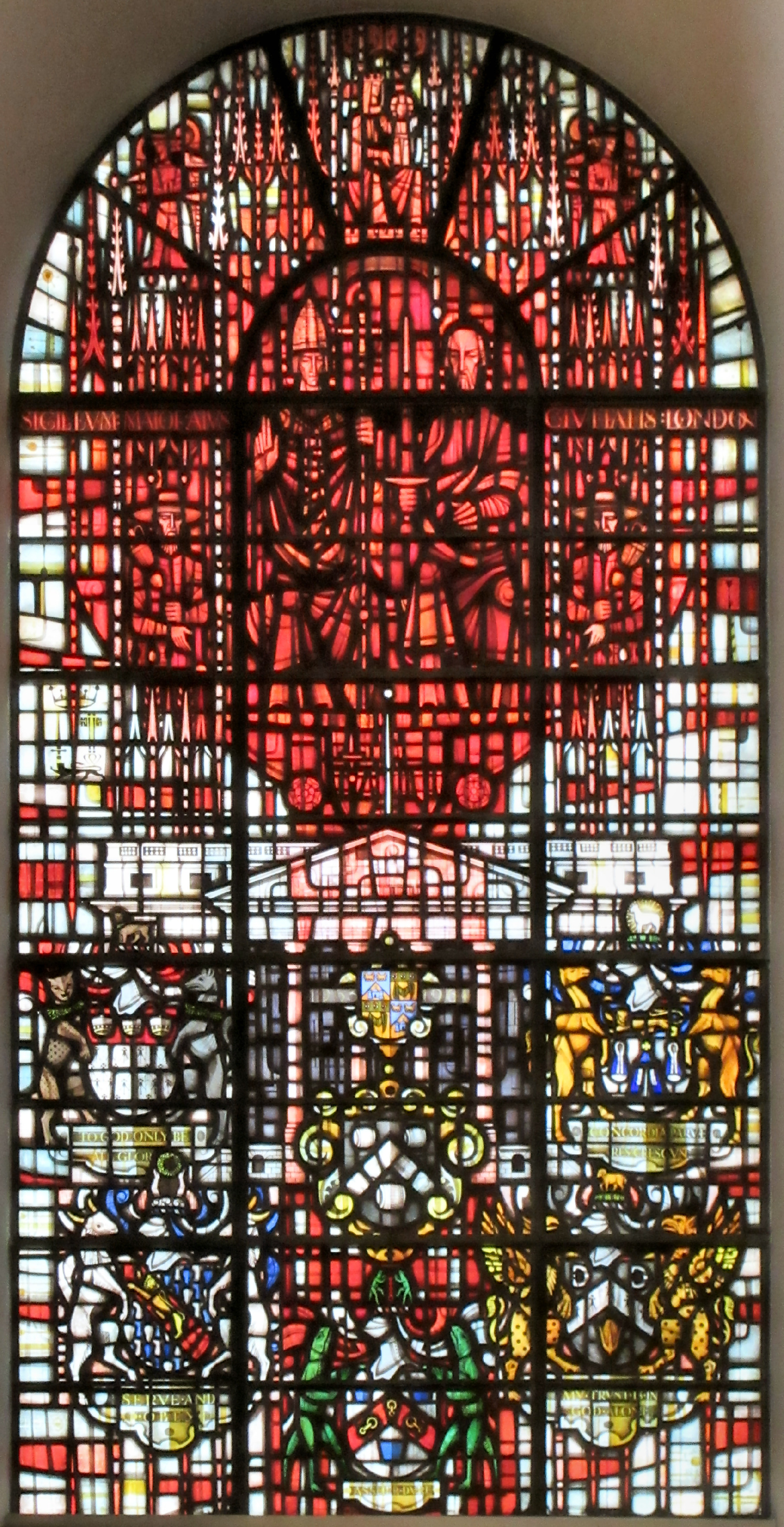
St Mary-le-Bow, City of London

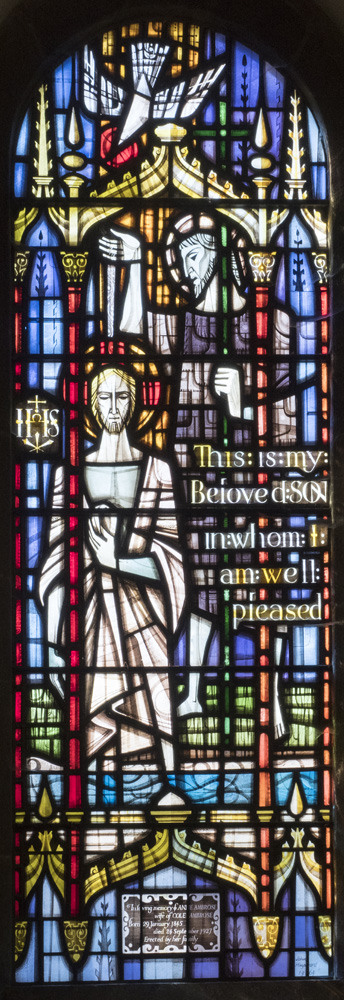
Holy Cross, Stuntney

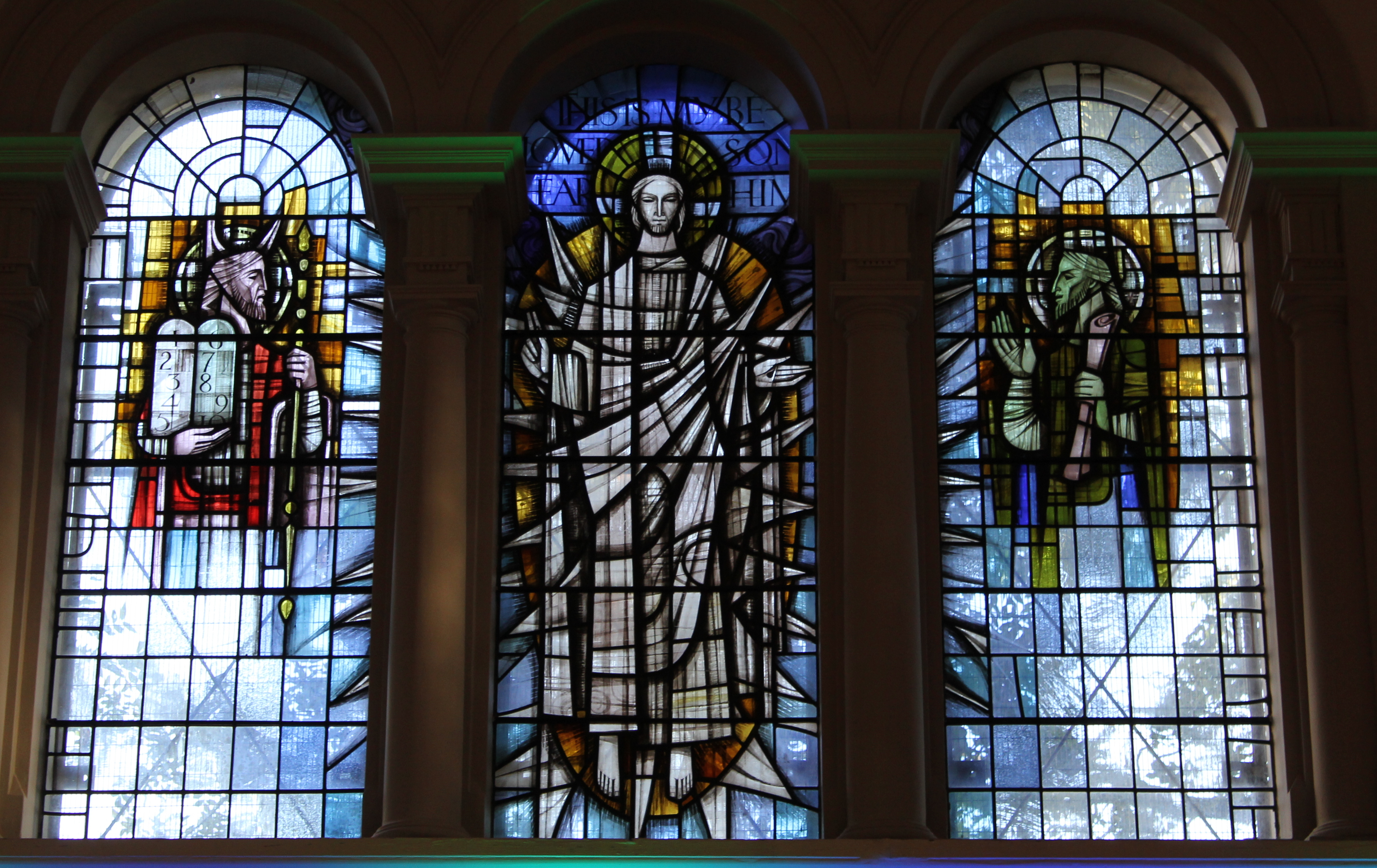
St Paul's Church, Shadwell

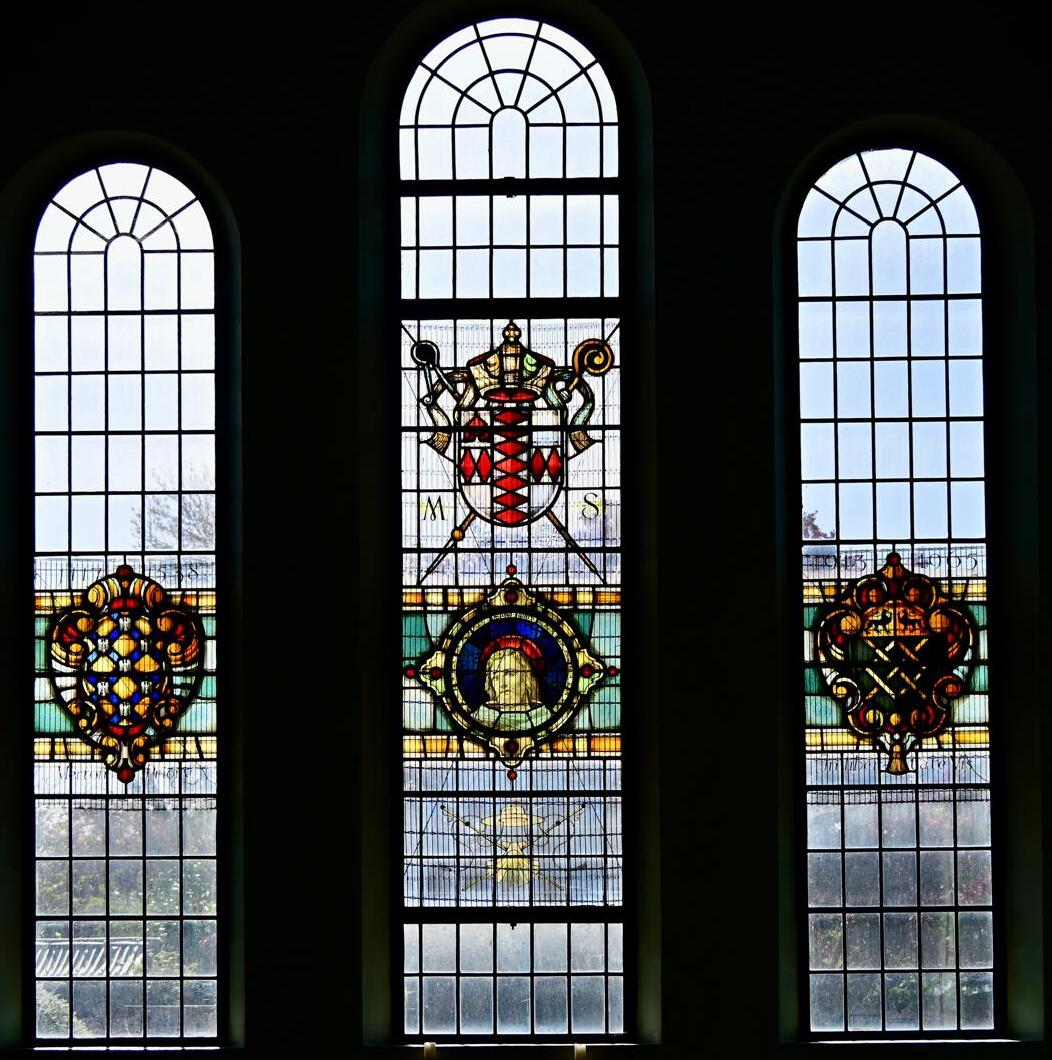
St James, Merton

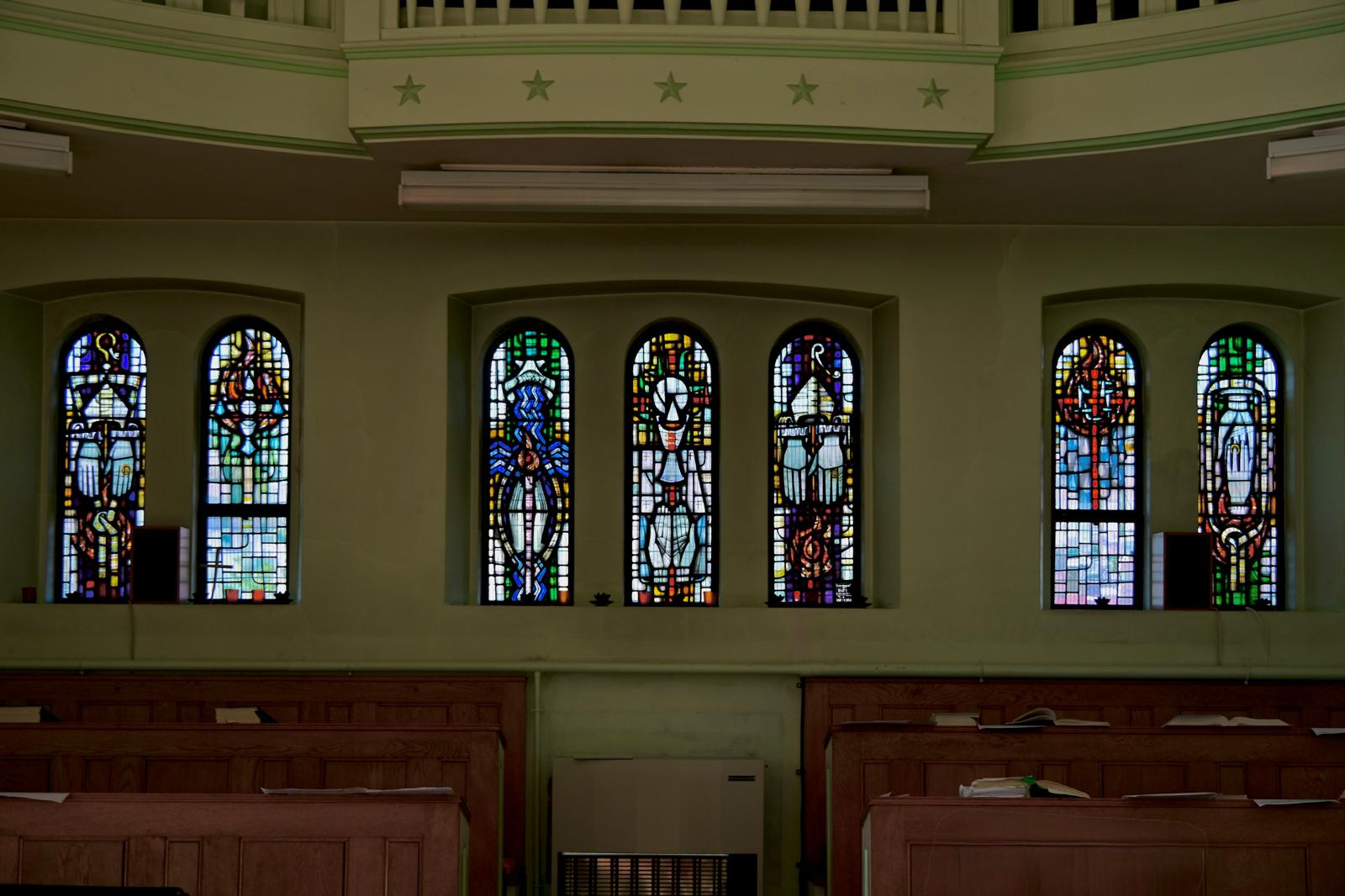
St James Merton

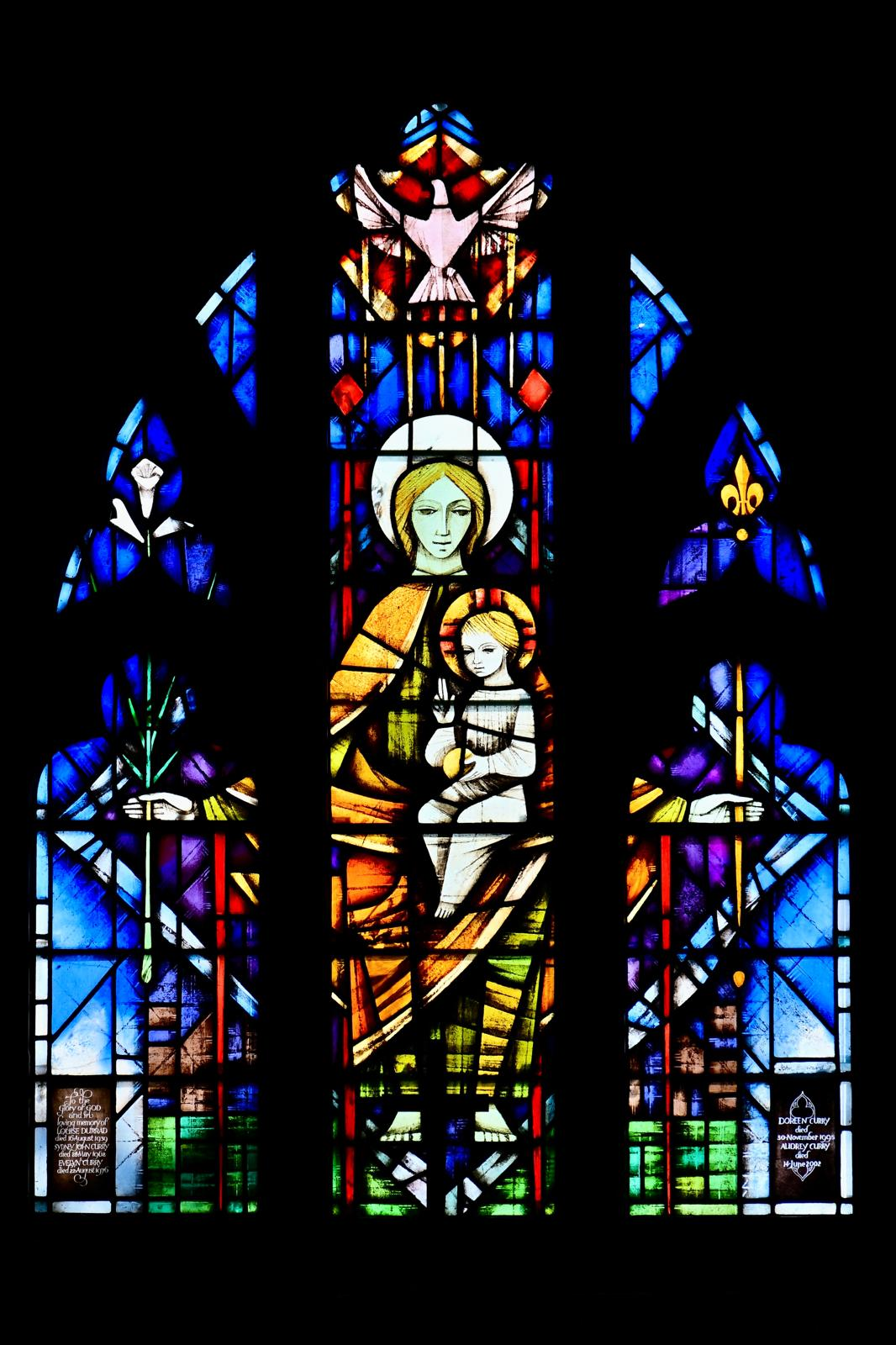
St James, New Malden

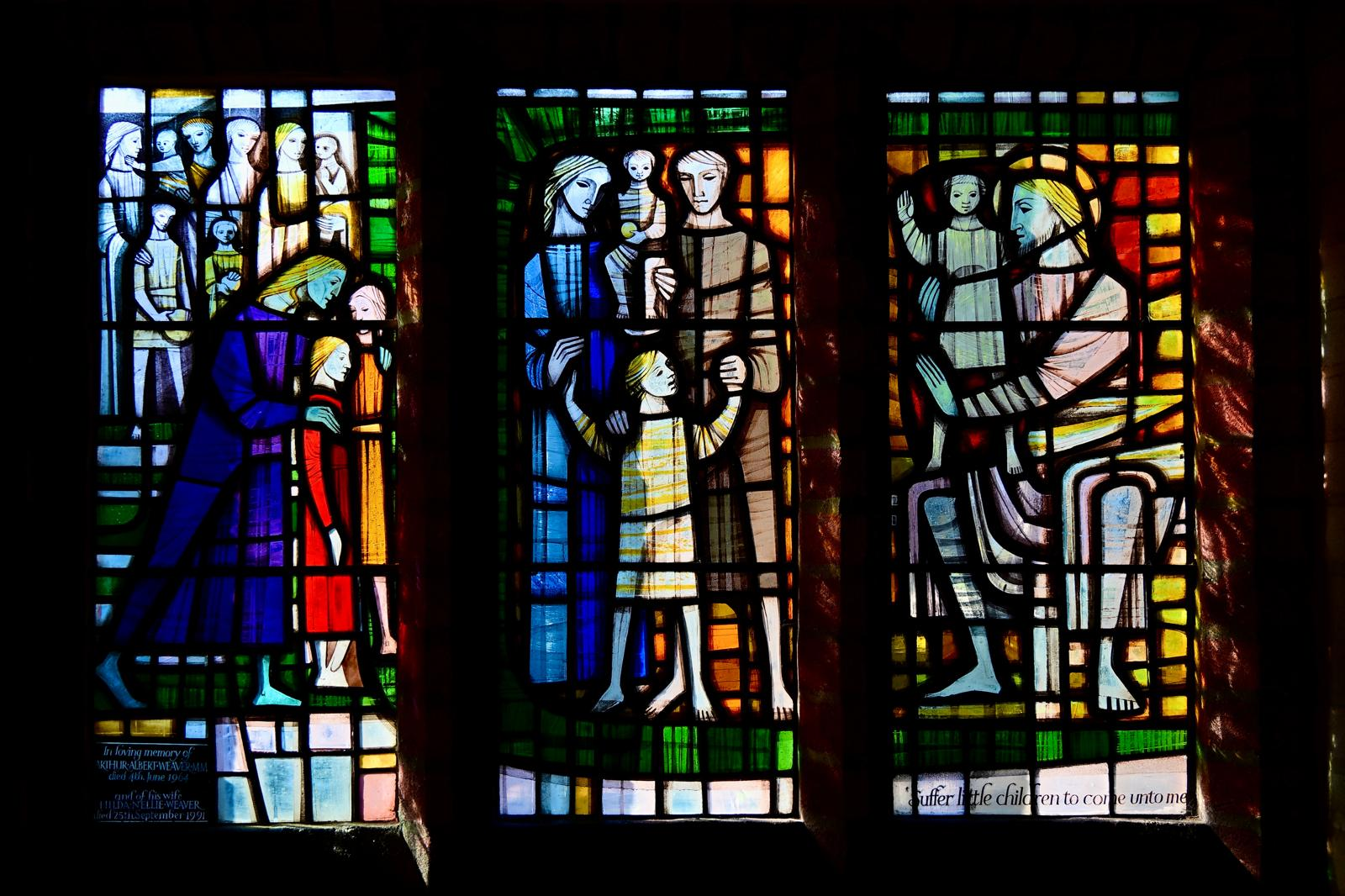
St James, New Malden

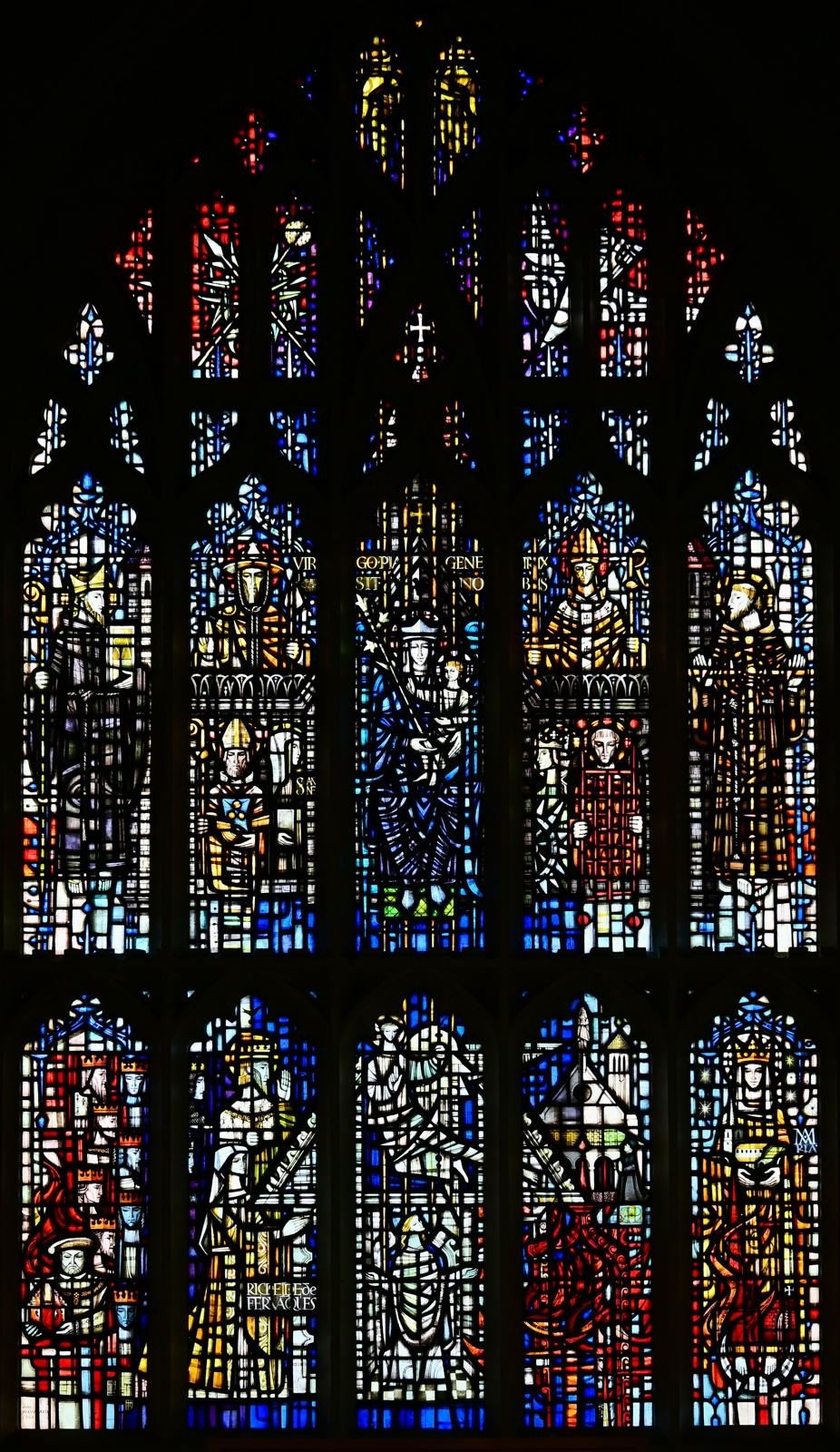
St Mary and All Saints, Little Walsingham

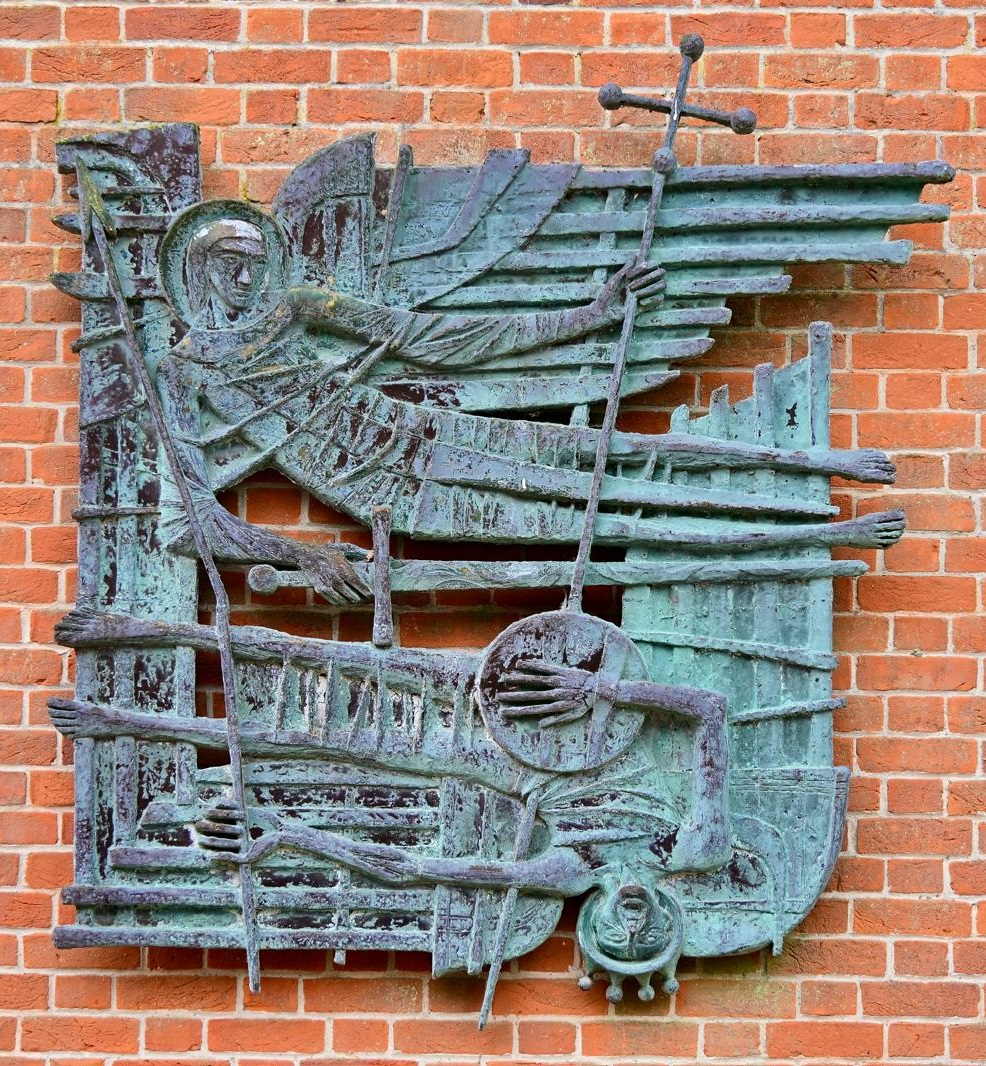
Chapel of the Guild of St Michael and the Holy Souls, Little Walsingham

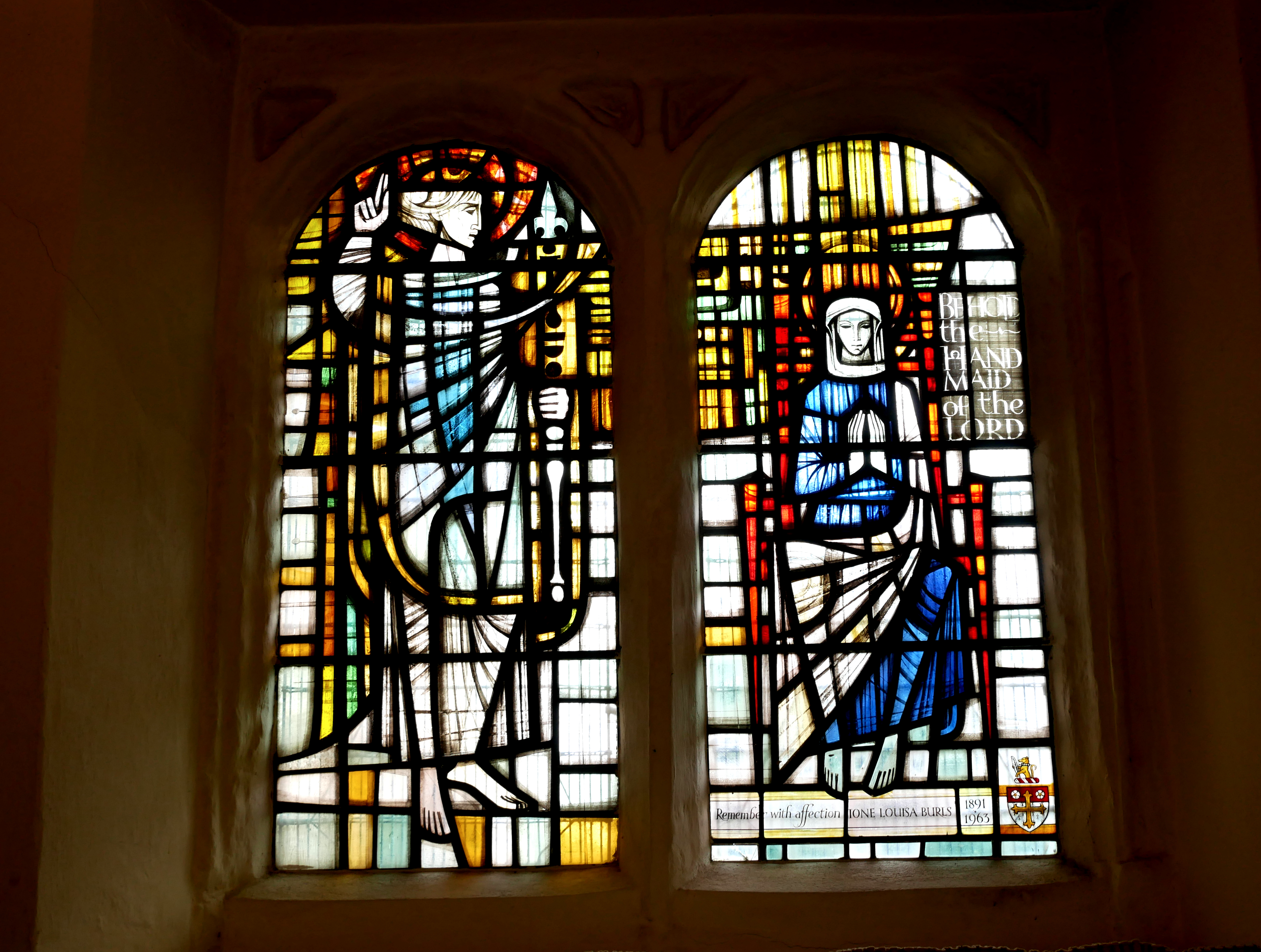
All Saints, Chingford

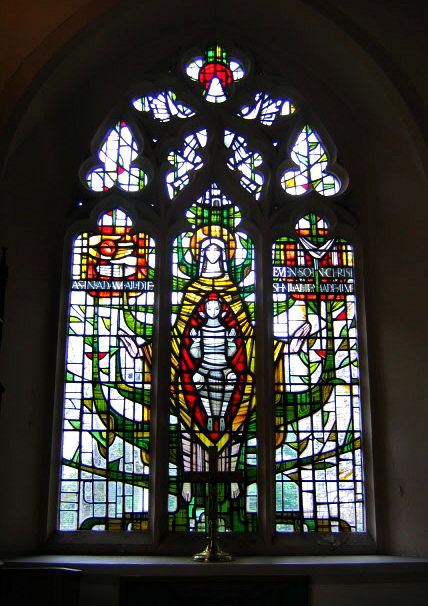
All Saints, Benhilton

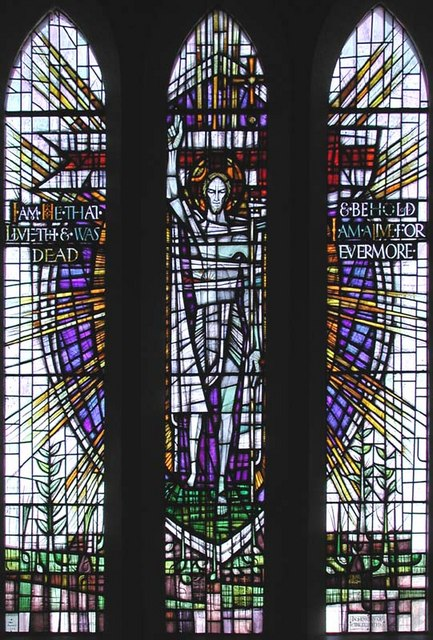
St Paul's, Chipperfield

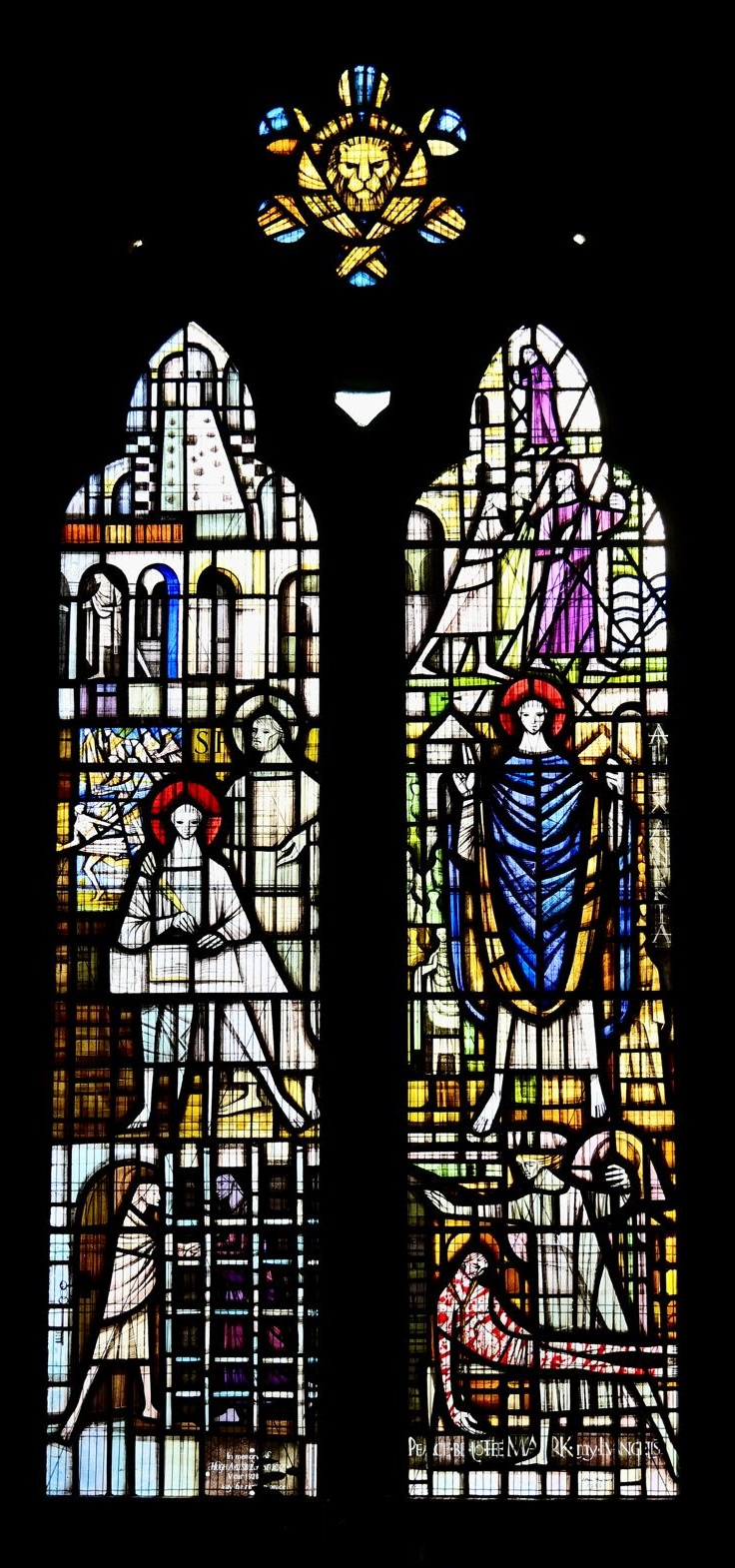
St Mark, Regent's Park

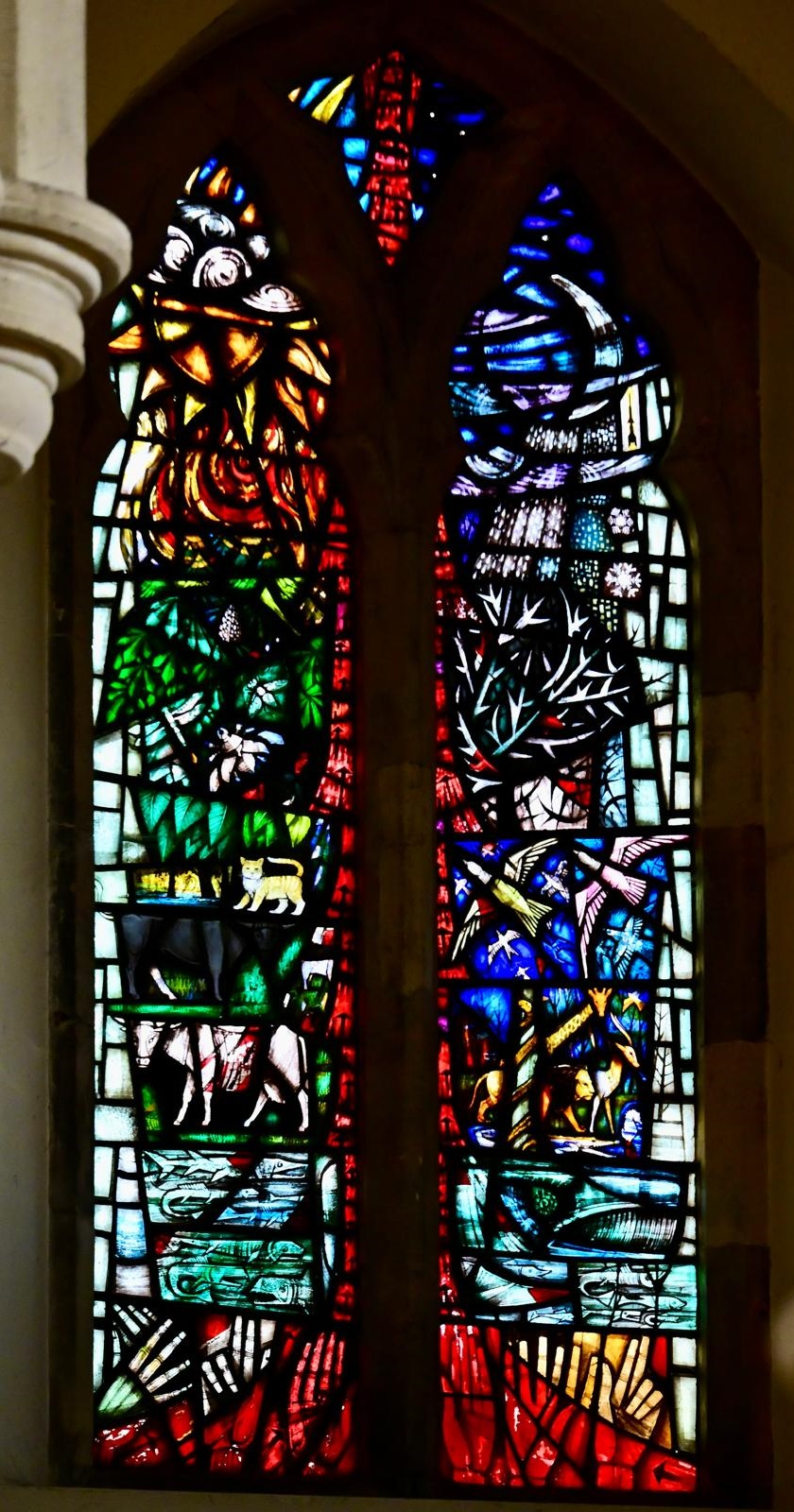
St Mark, Regent's Park

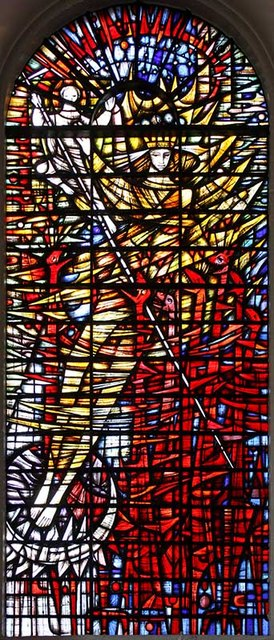
St Michael Paternoster Royal, City of London

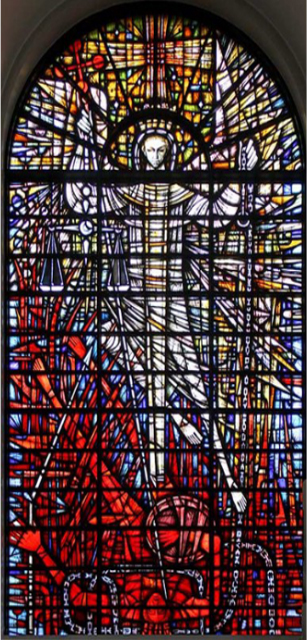
St Michael Paternoster Royal, City of London

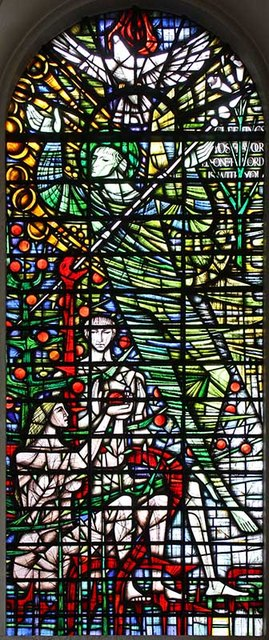
St Michael Paternoster Royal, City of London

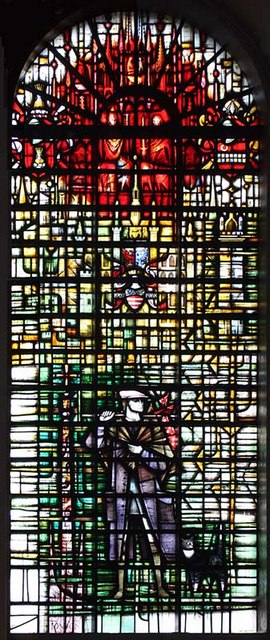
St Michael Paternoster Royal, City of London

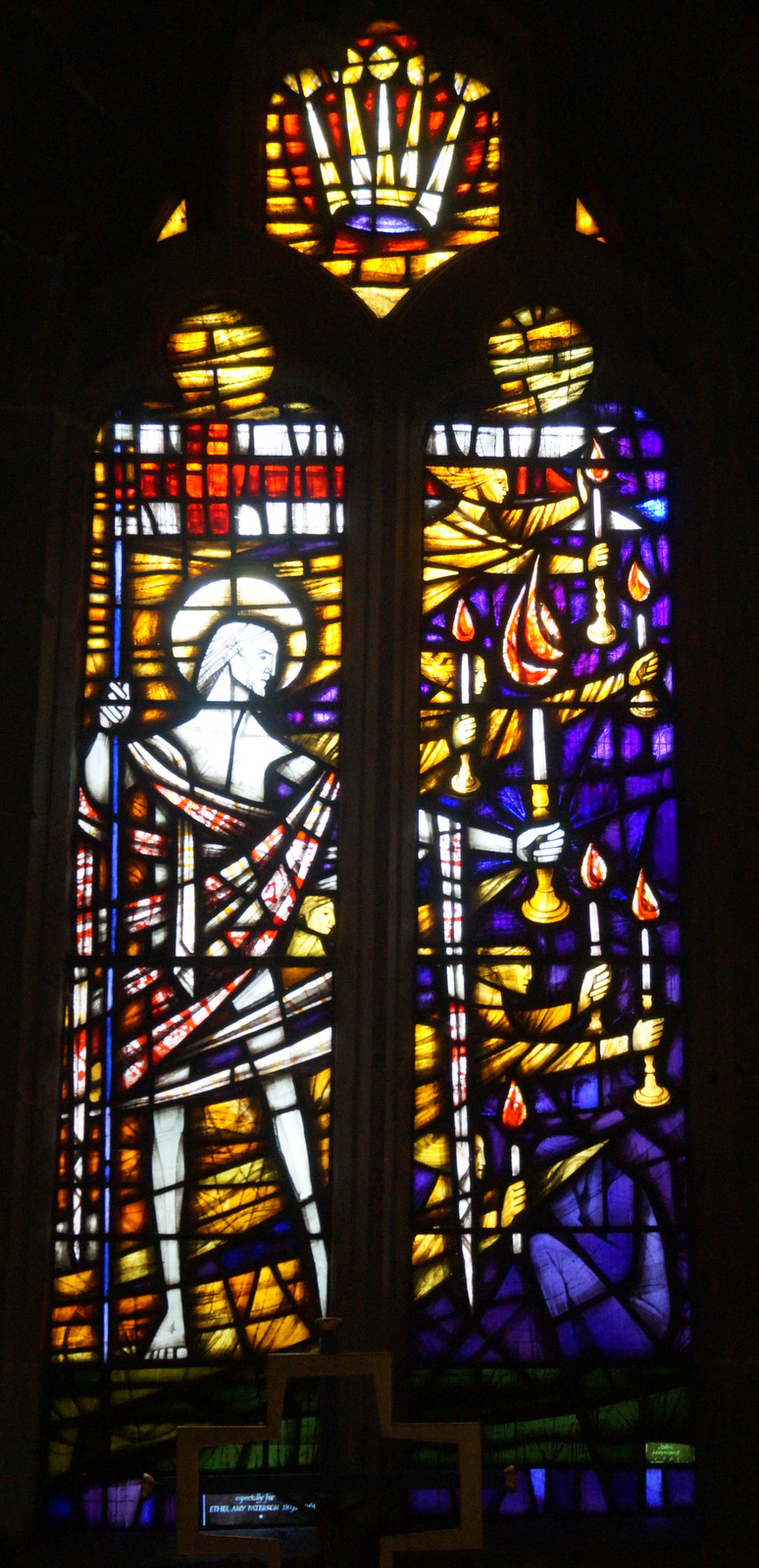
St Mary, Hampton in Arden

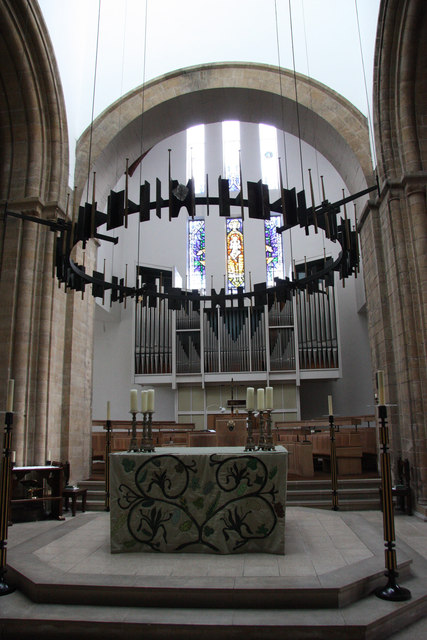
Worksop Priory

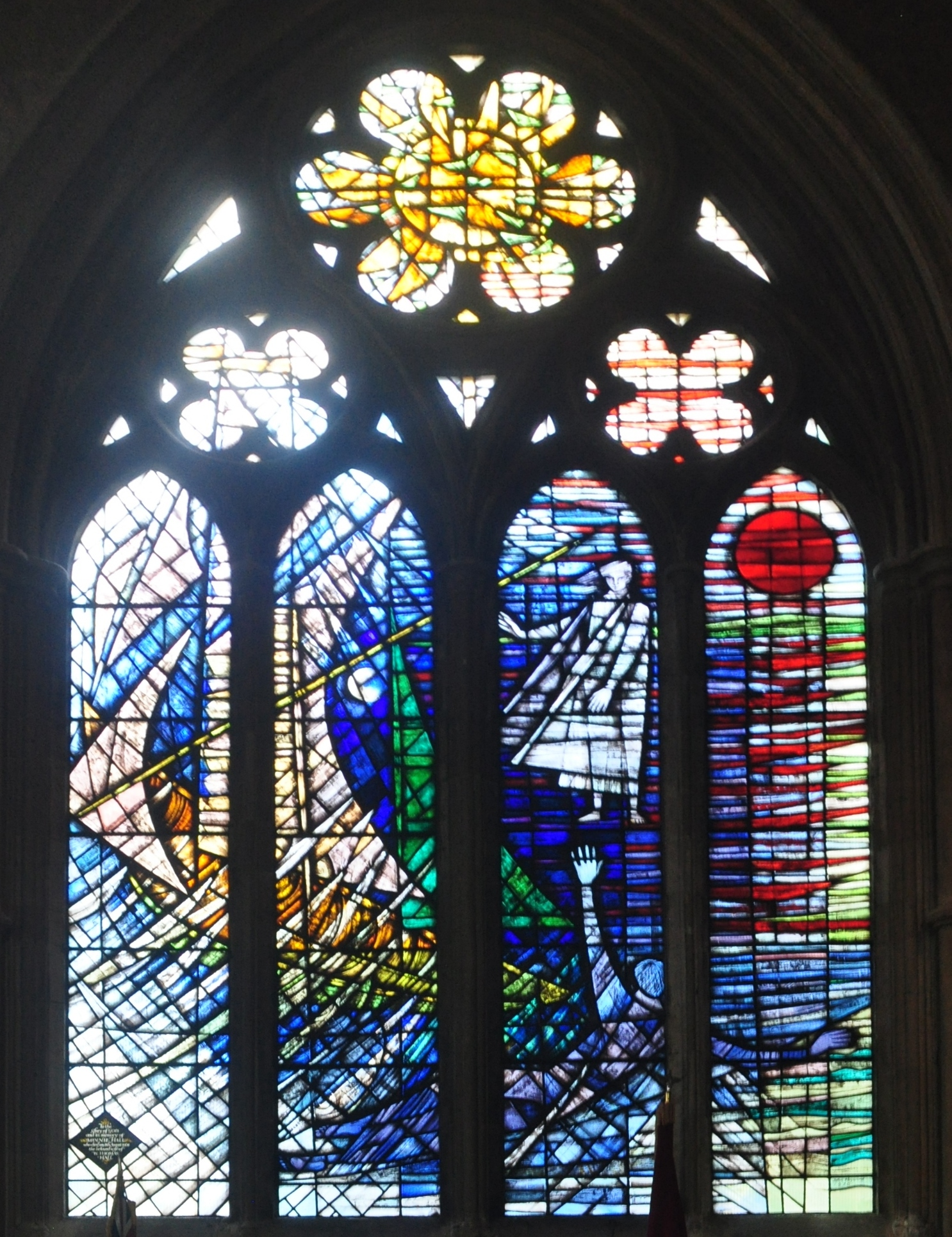
St Wulfram, Grantham

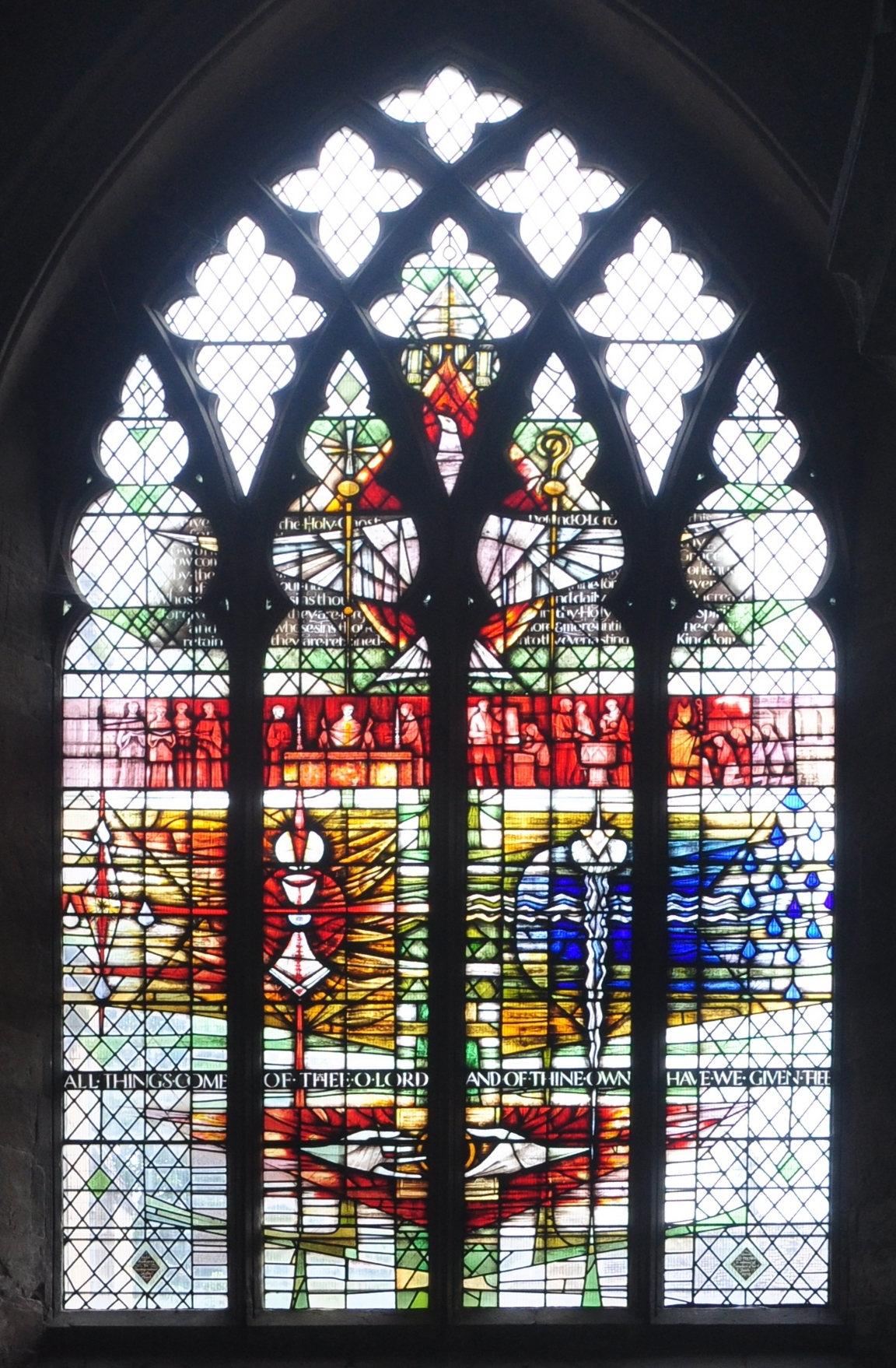
St Wulfram, Grantham

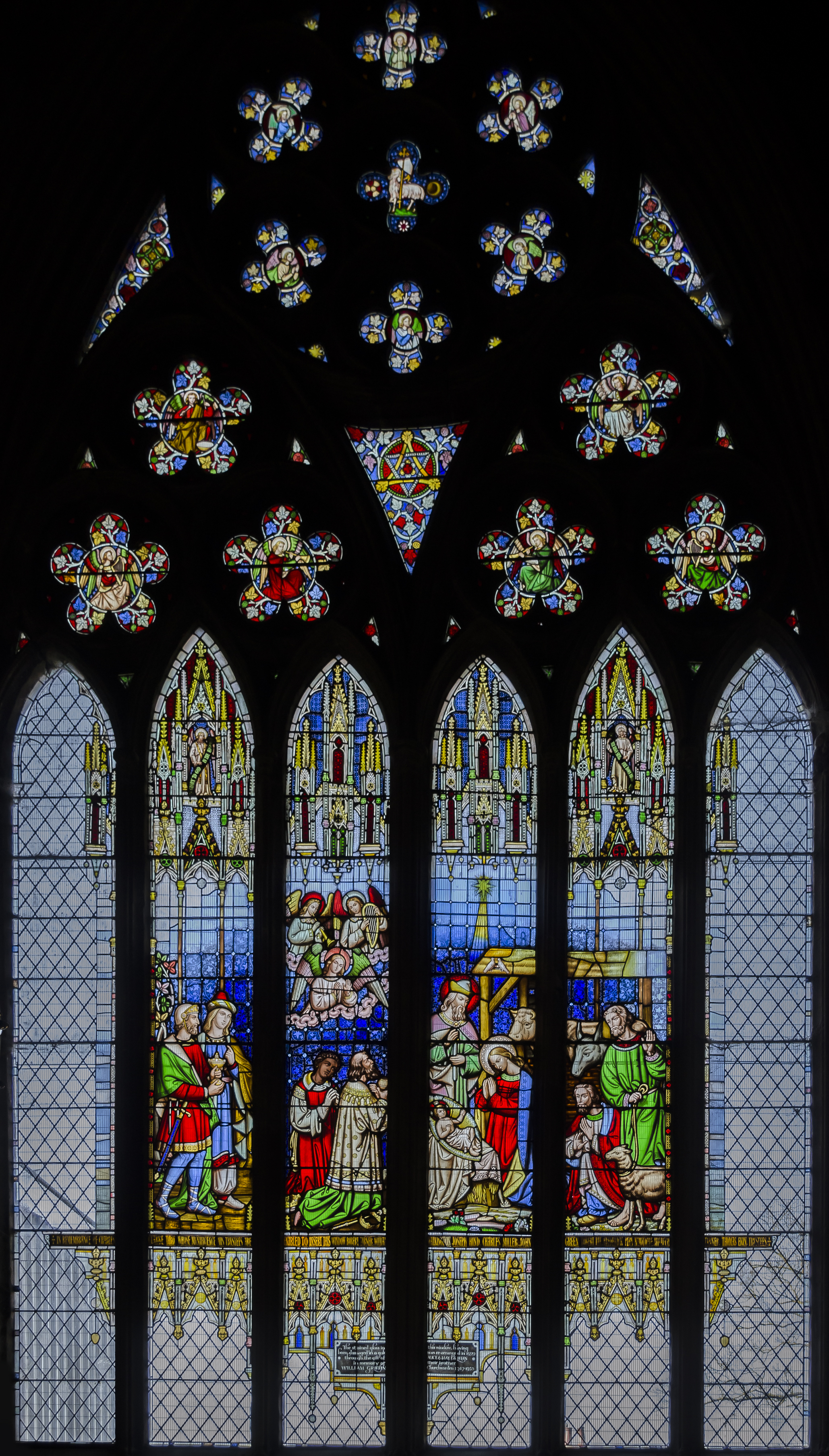
St Wulfram, Grantham

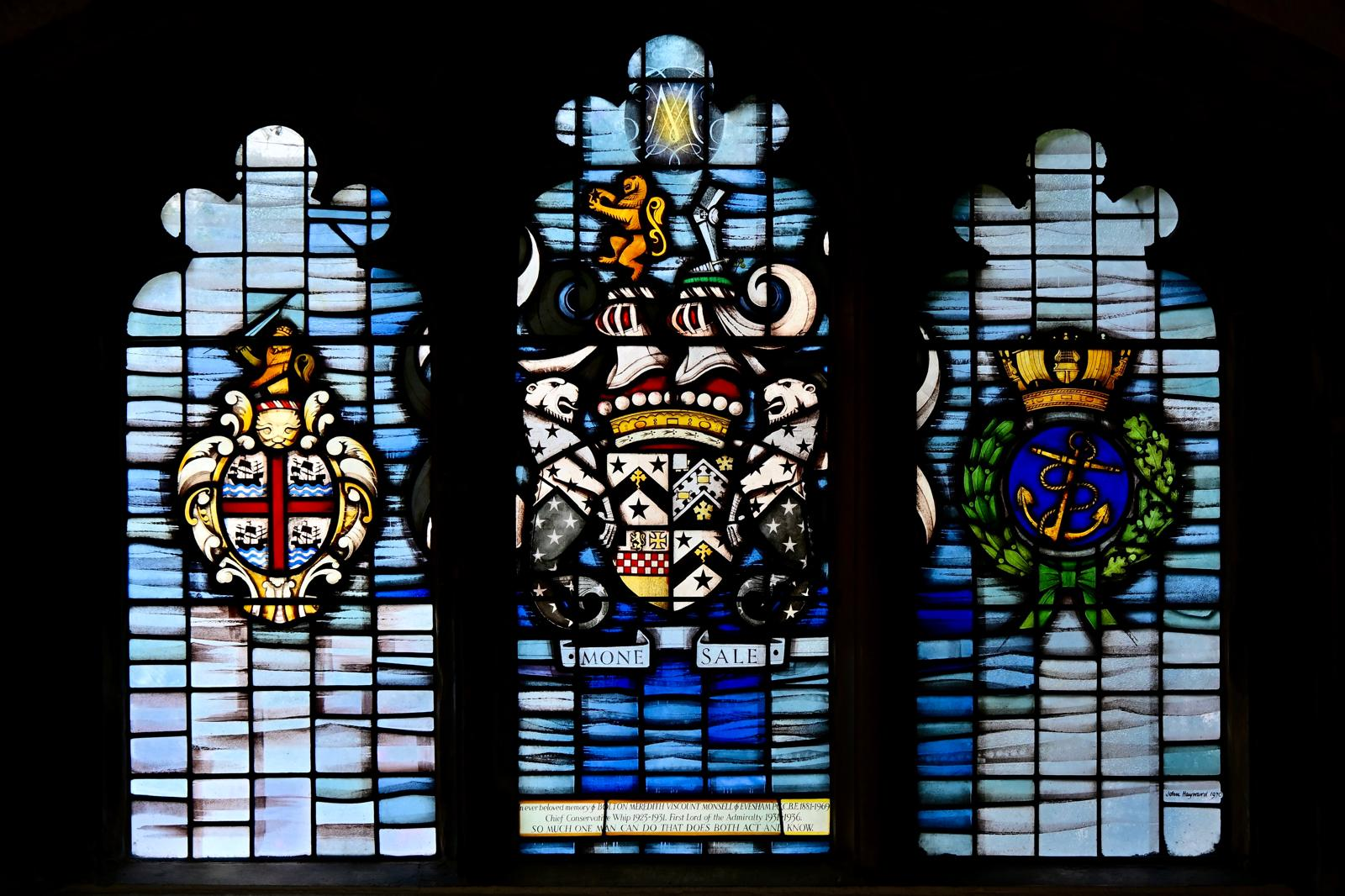
St Olave Hart Street, City of London

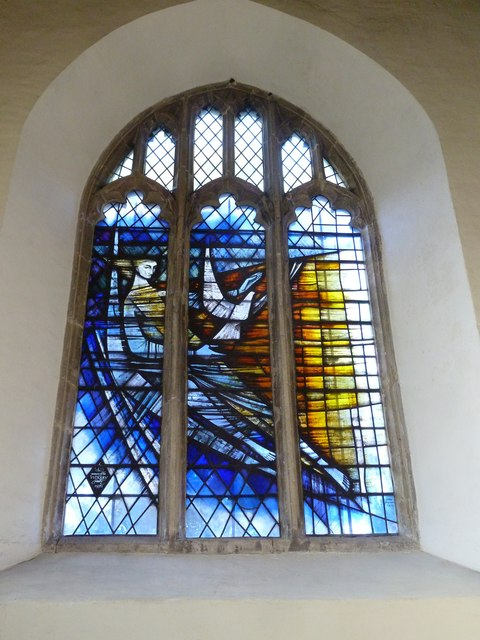
St Mary, Old Basing

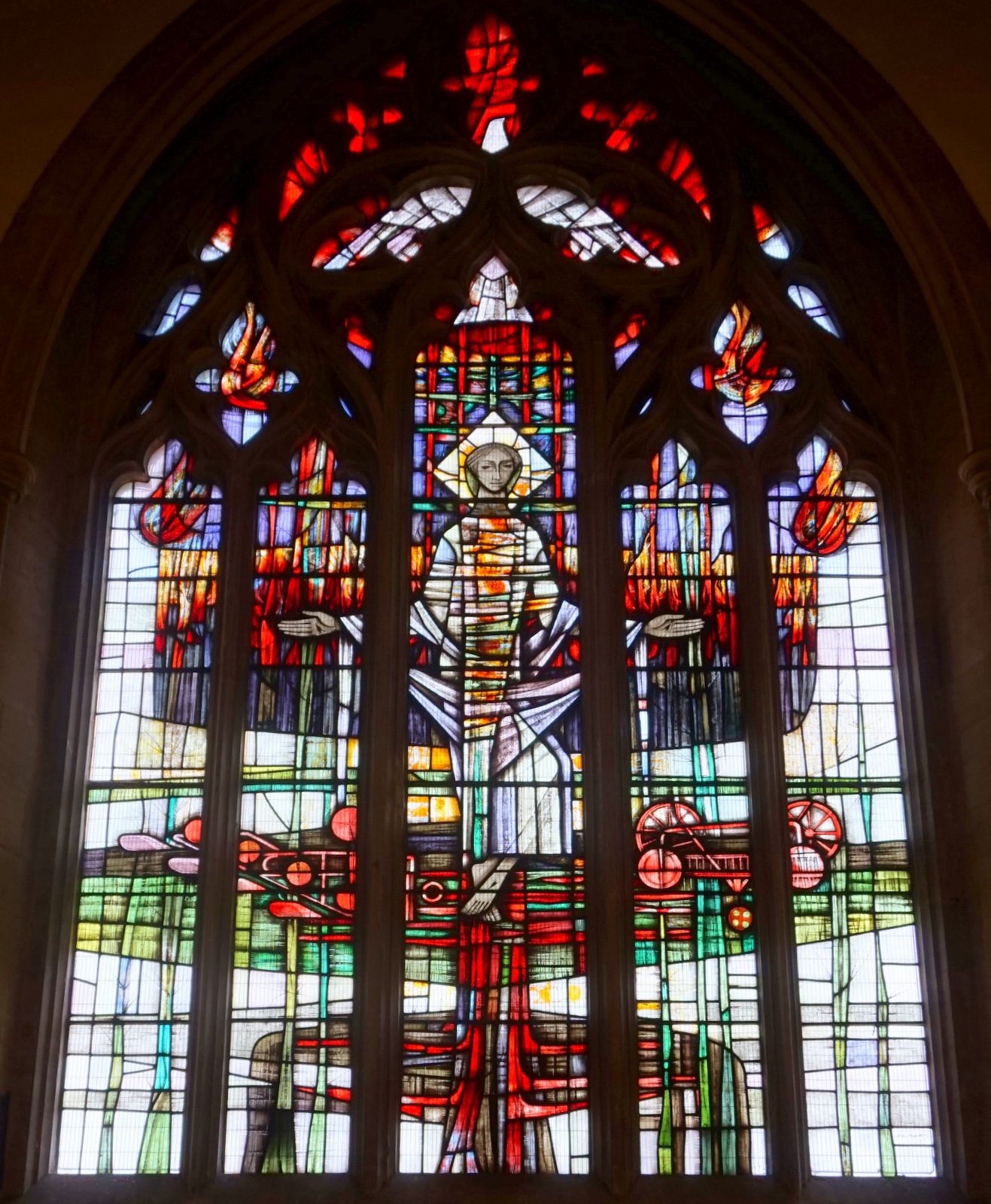
All Saints, Nettleham

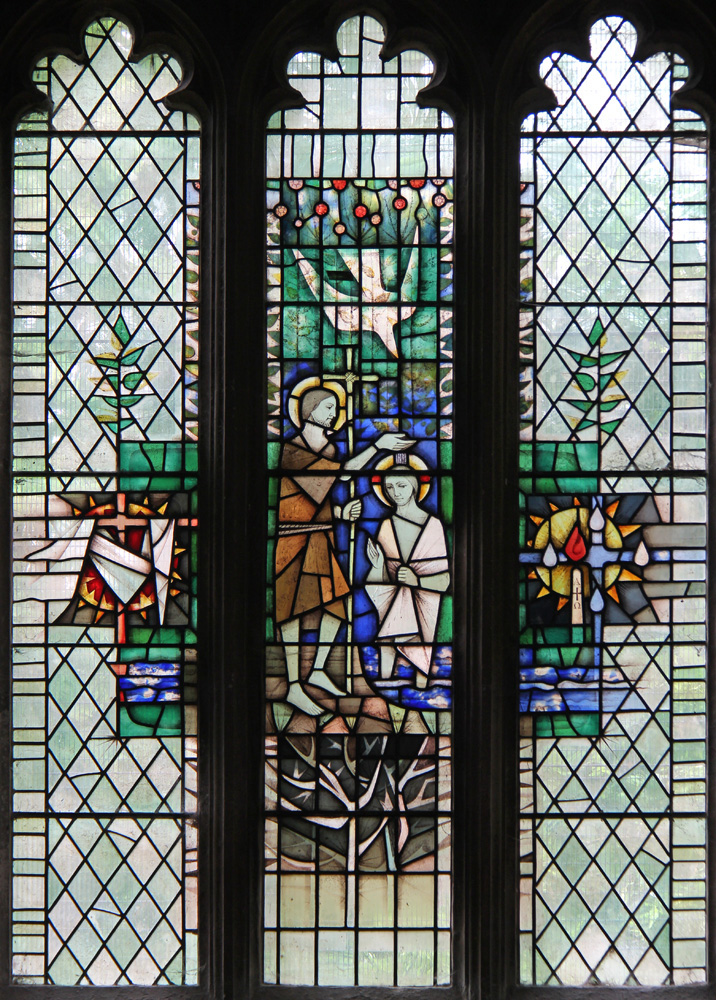
Dunstable Priory

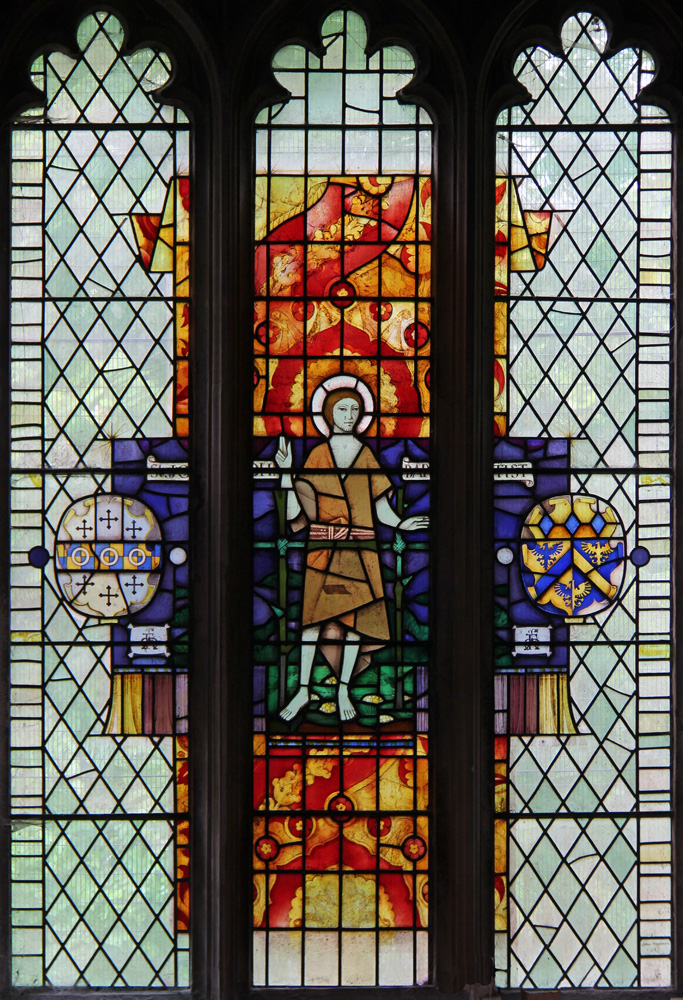
Dunstable Priory

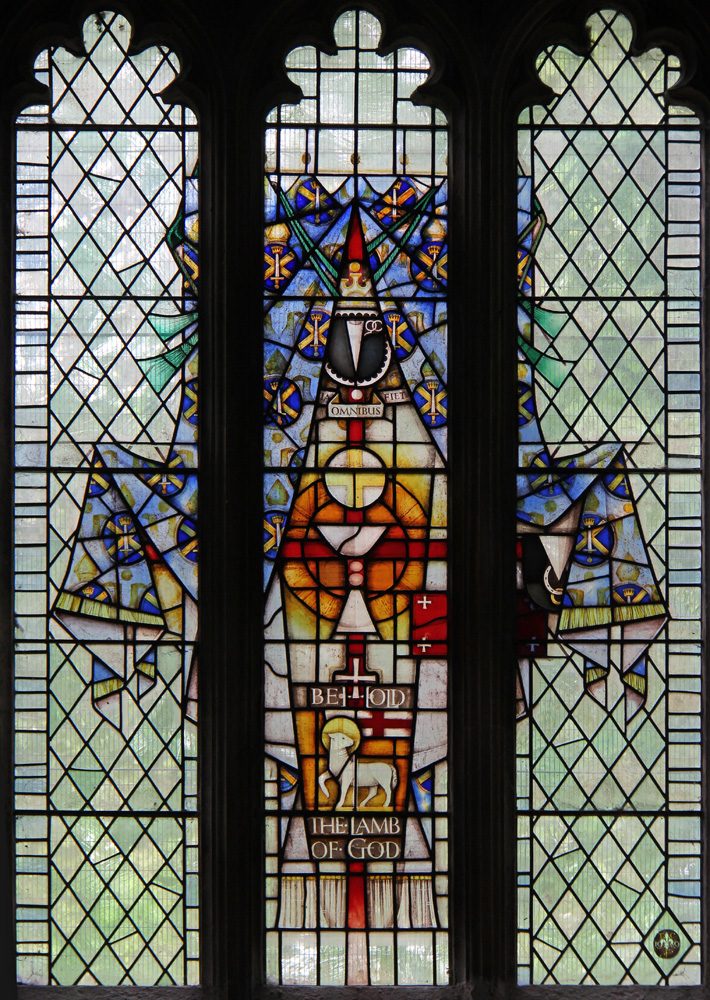
Dunstable Priory

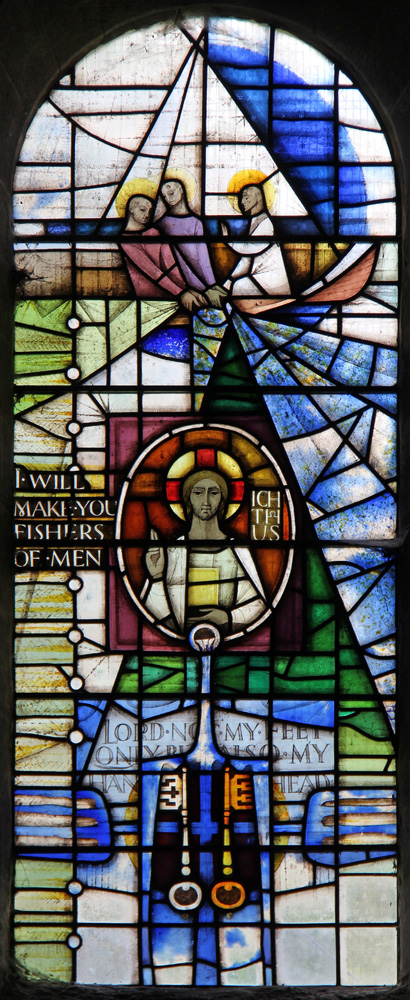
Dunstable Priory

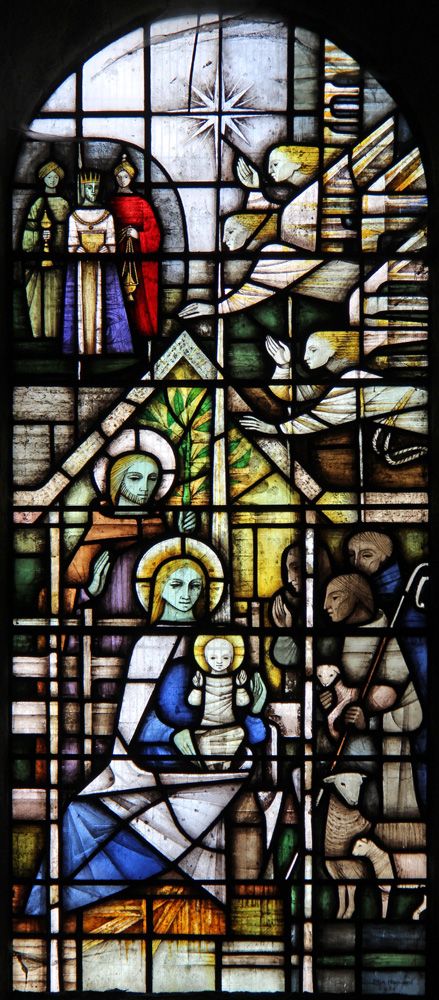
Dunstable Priory

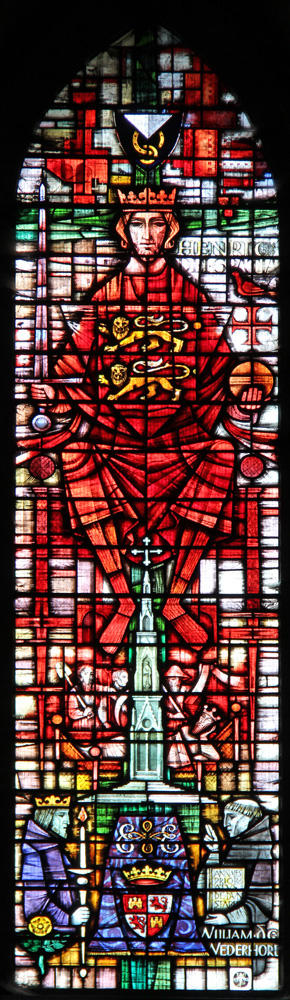
Dunstable Priory

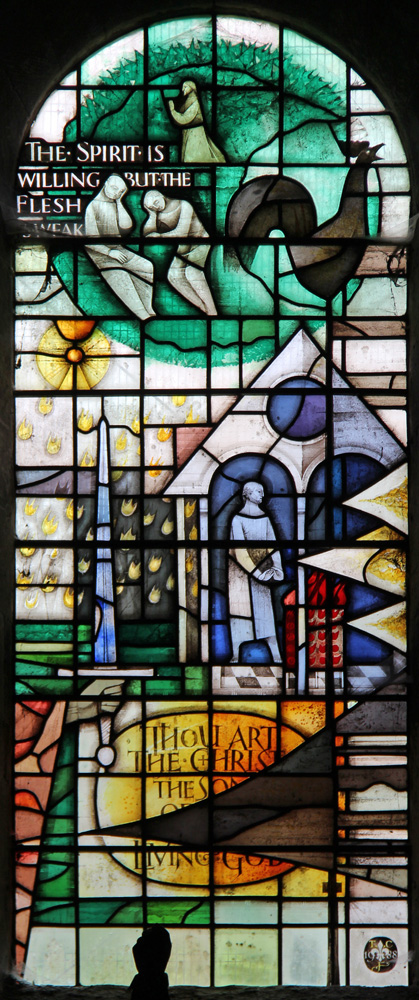
Dunstable Priory

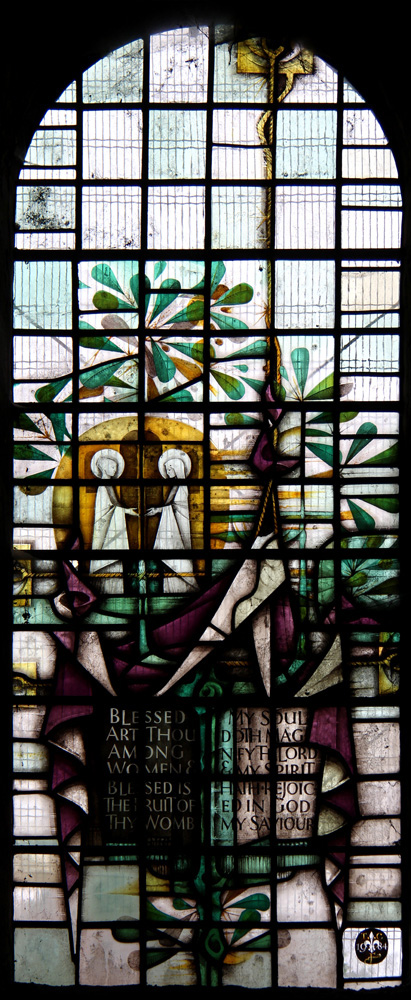
Dunstable Priory

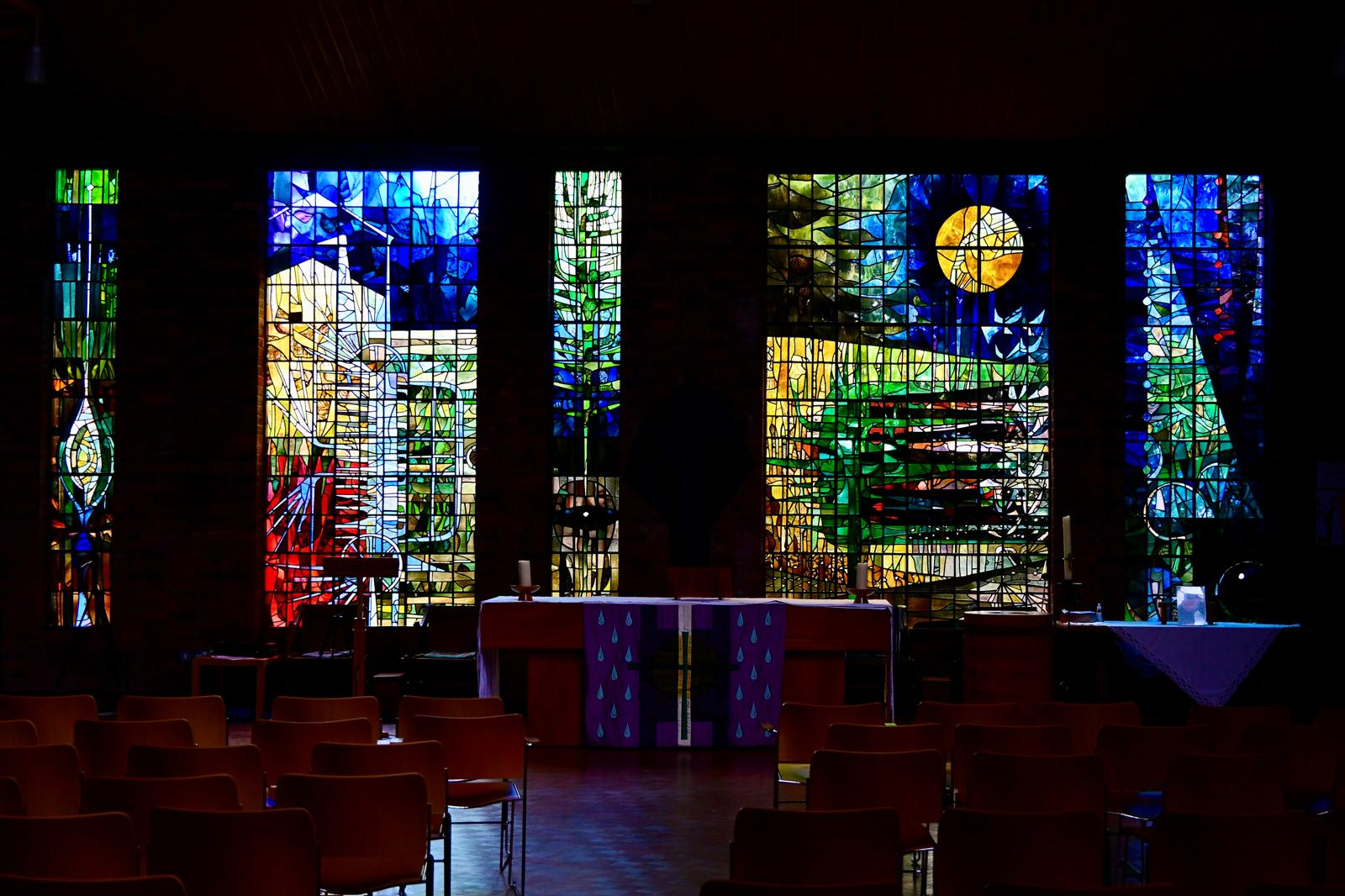
St Matthew, Croydon

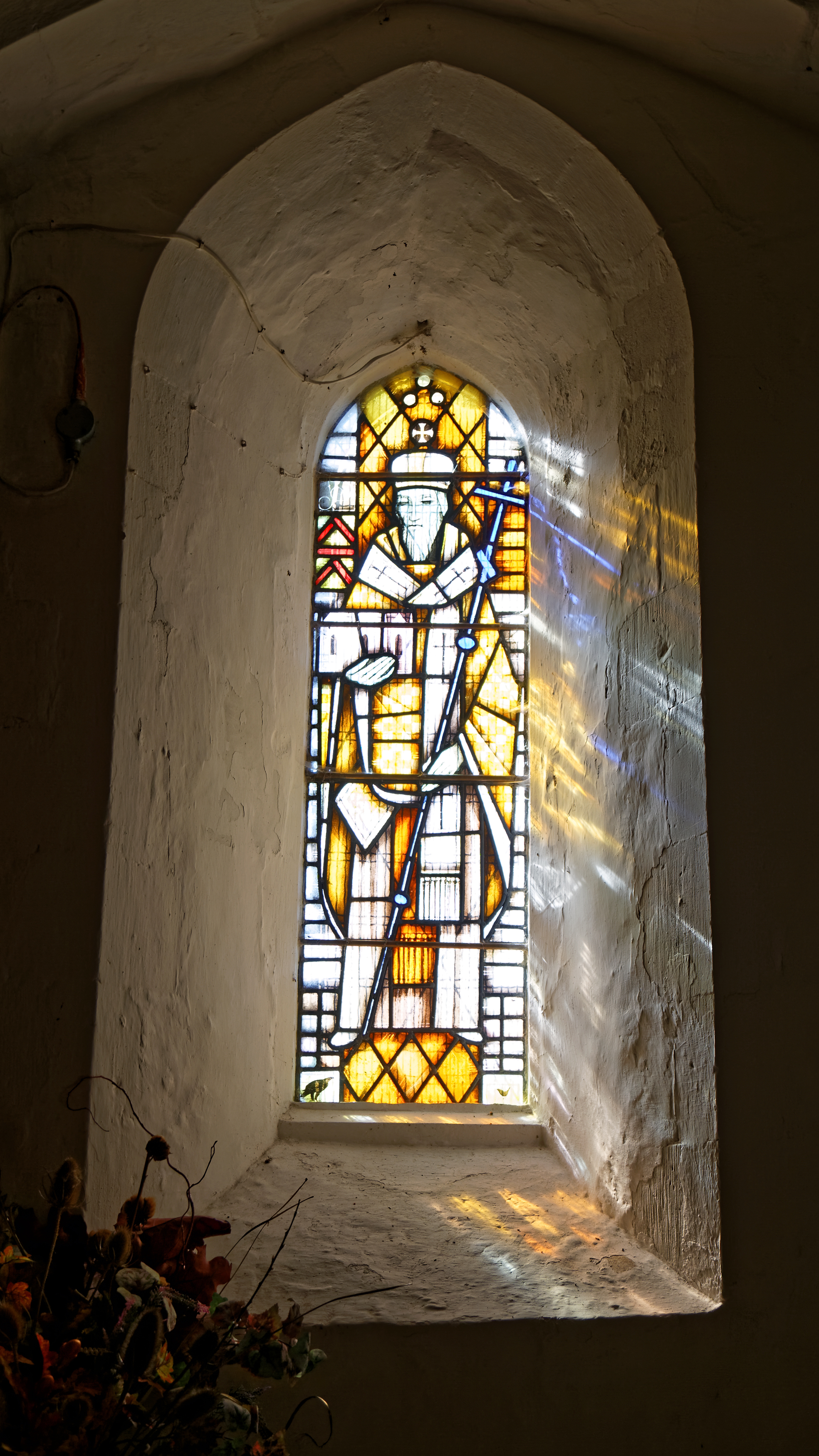
St Mary the Virgin, Sheering

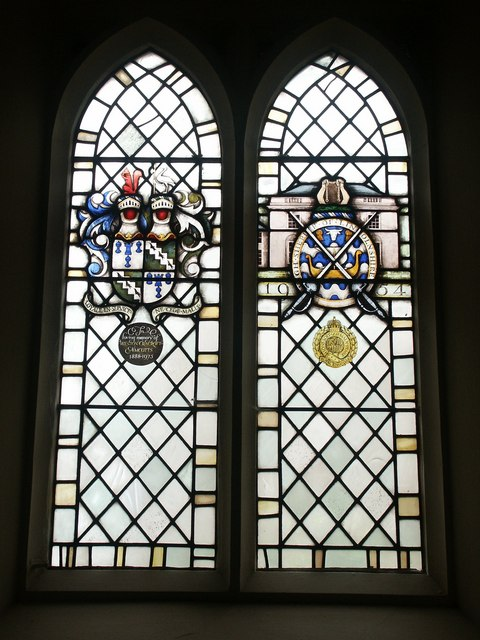
St Michael and All Angels, Hackthorn

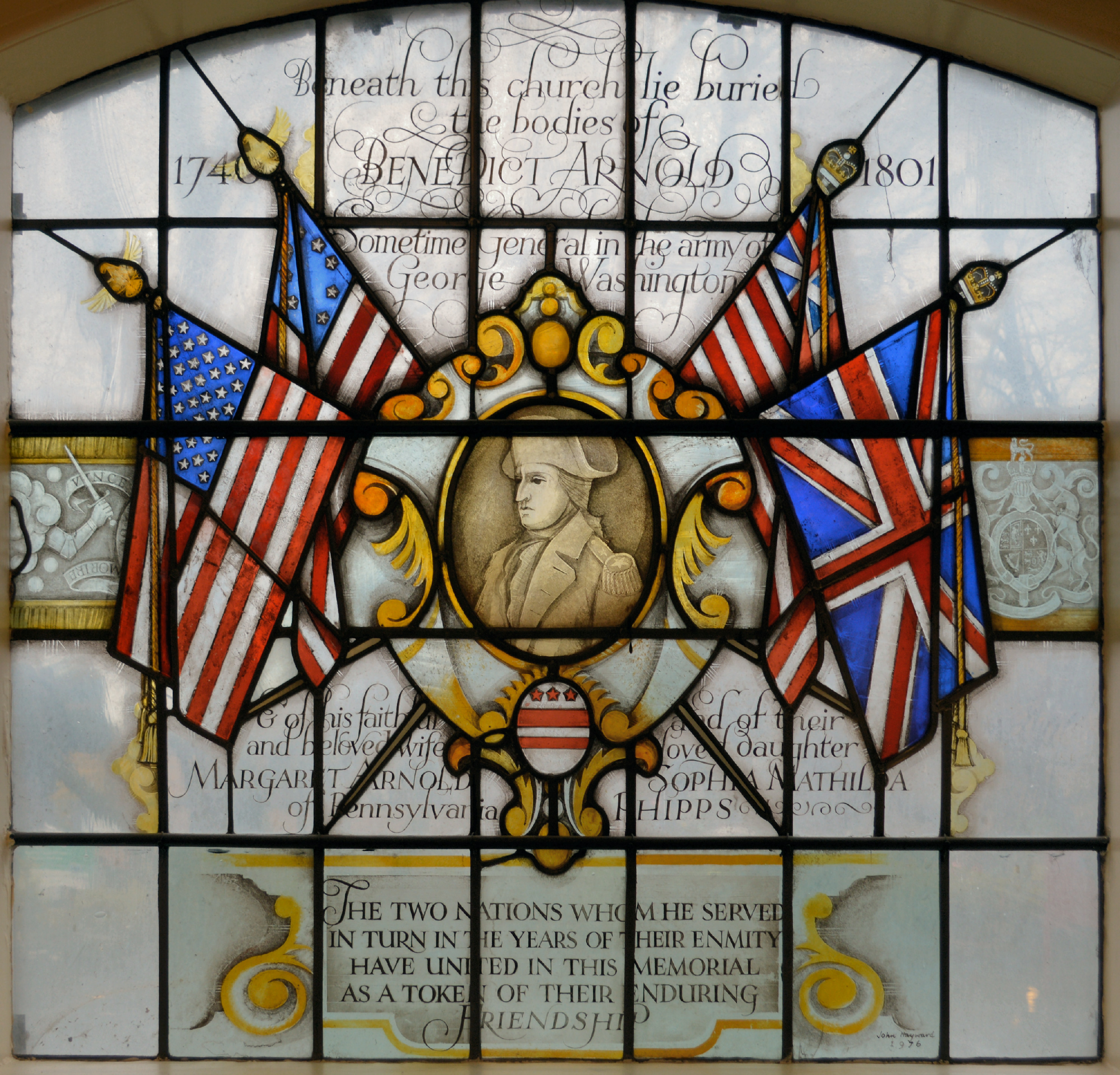
St Mary, Battersea

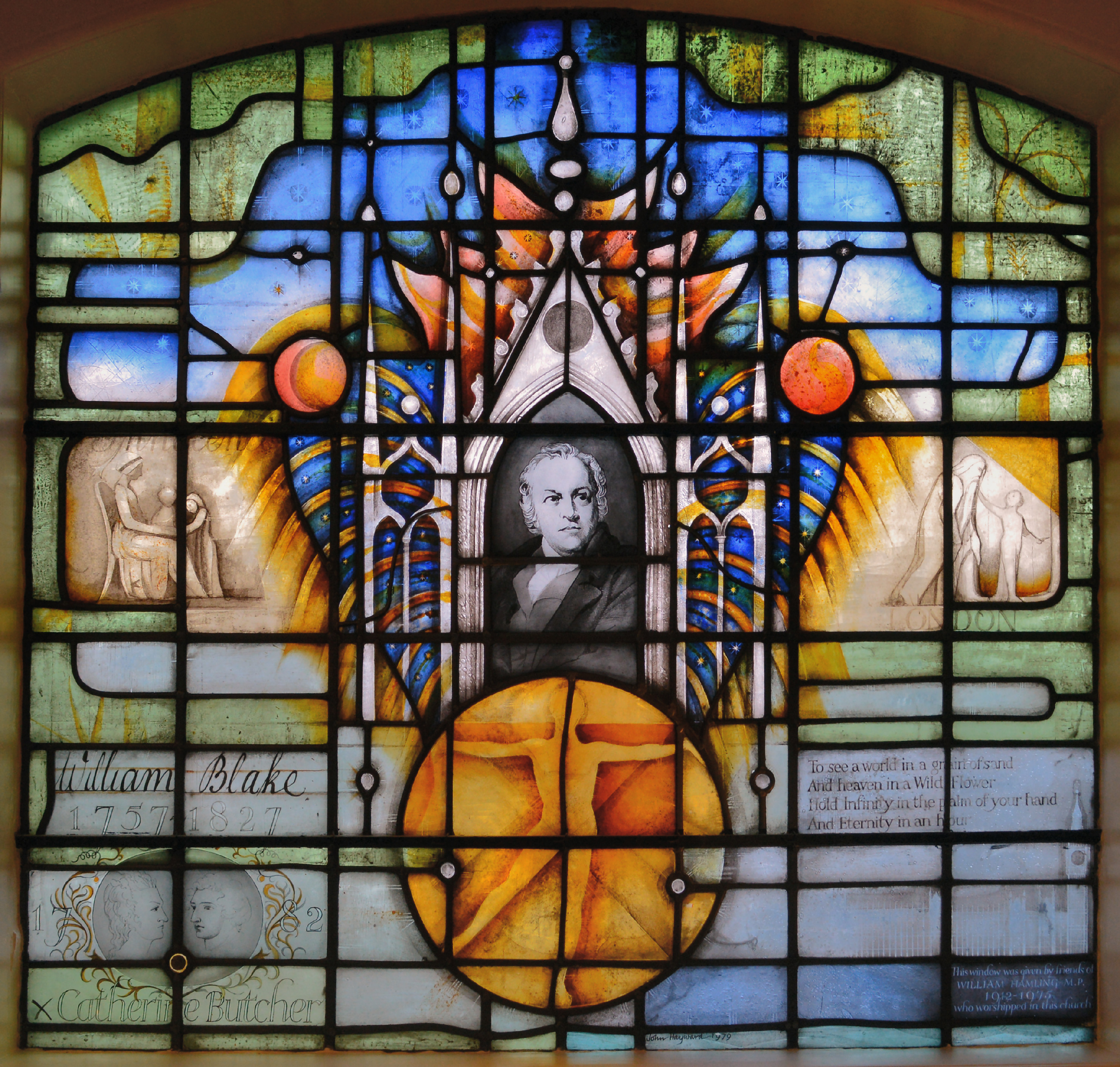
St Mary, Battersea

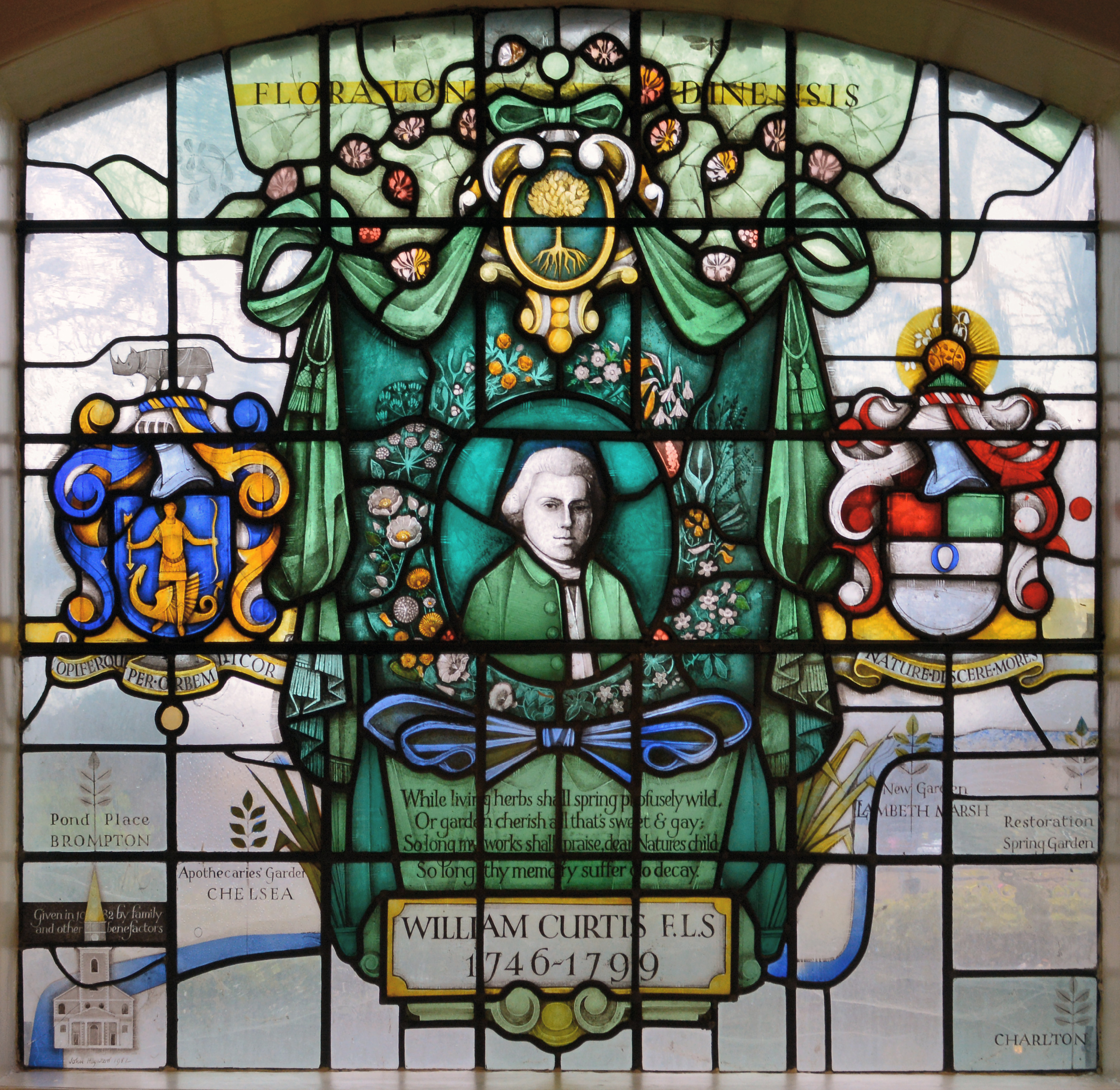
St Mary, Battersea

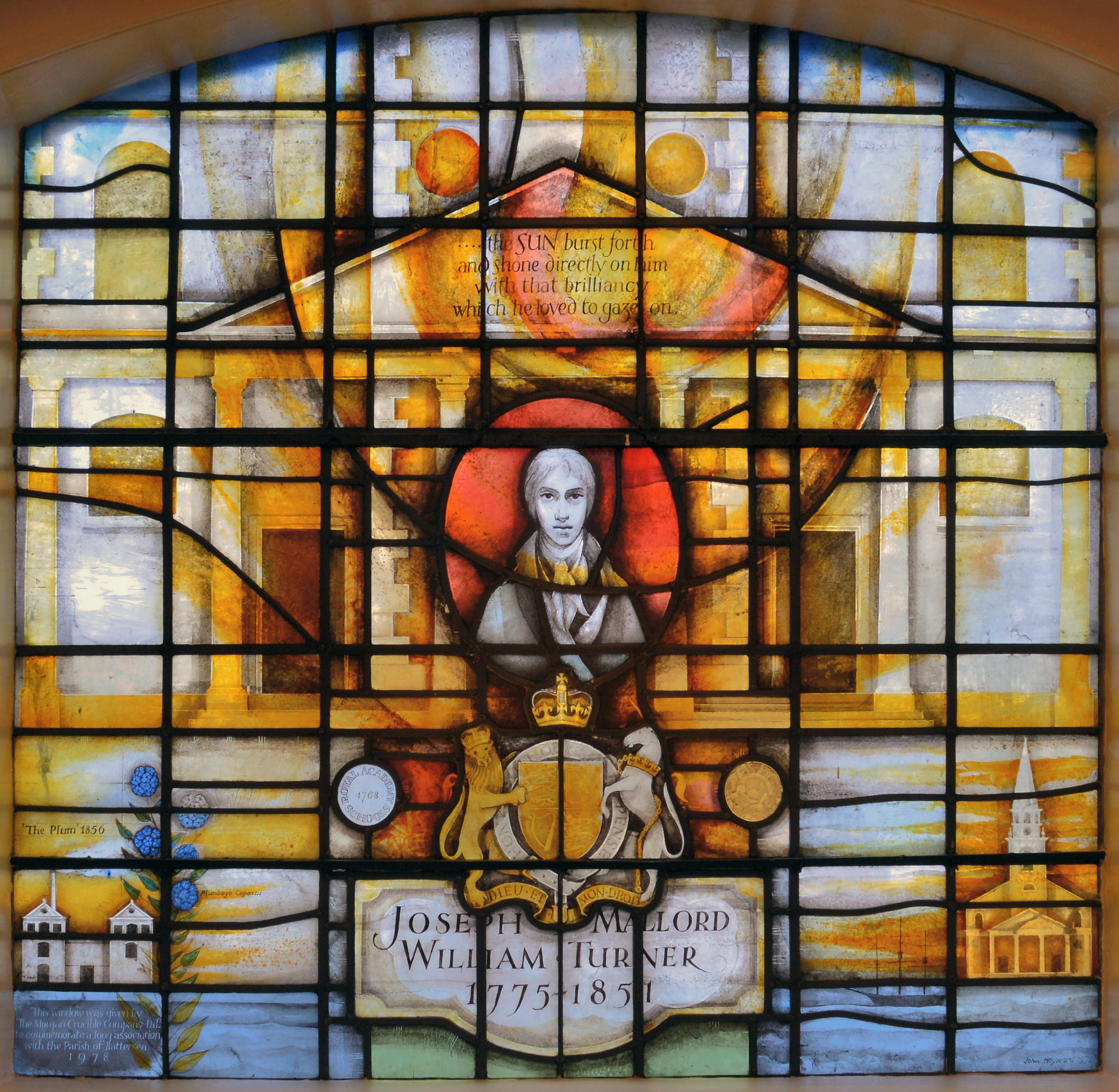
St Mary, Battersea

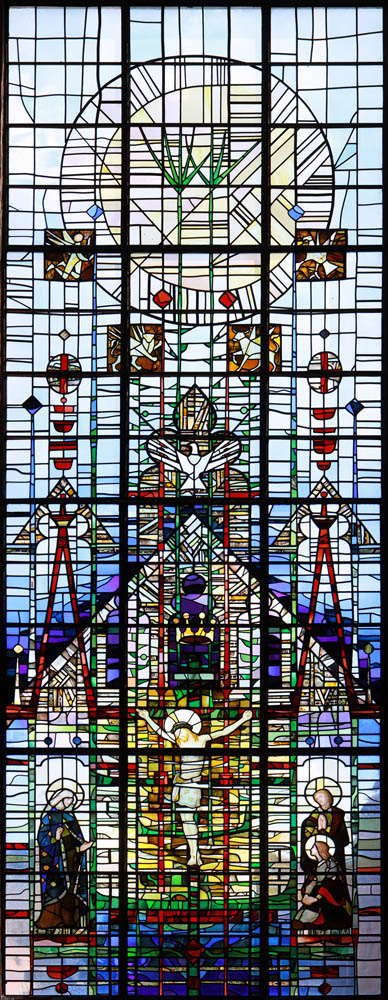
St Luke, Shepherd's Bush

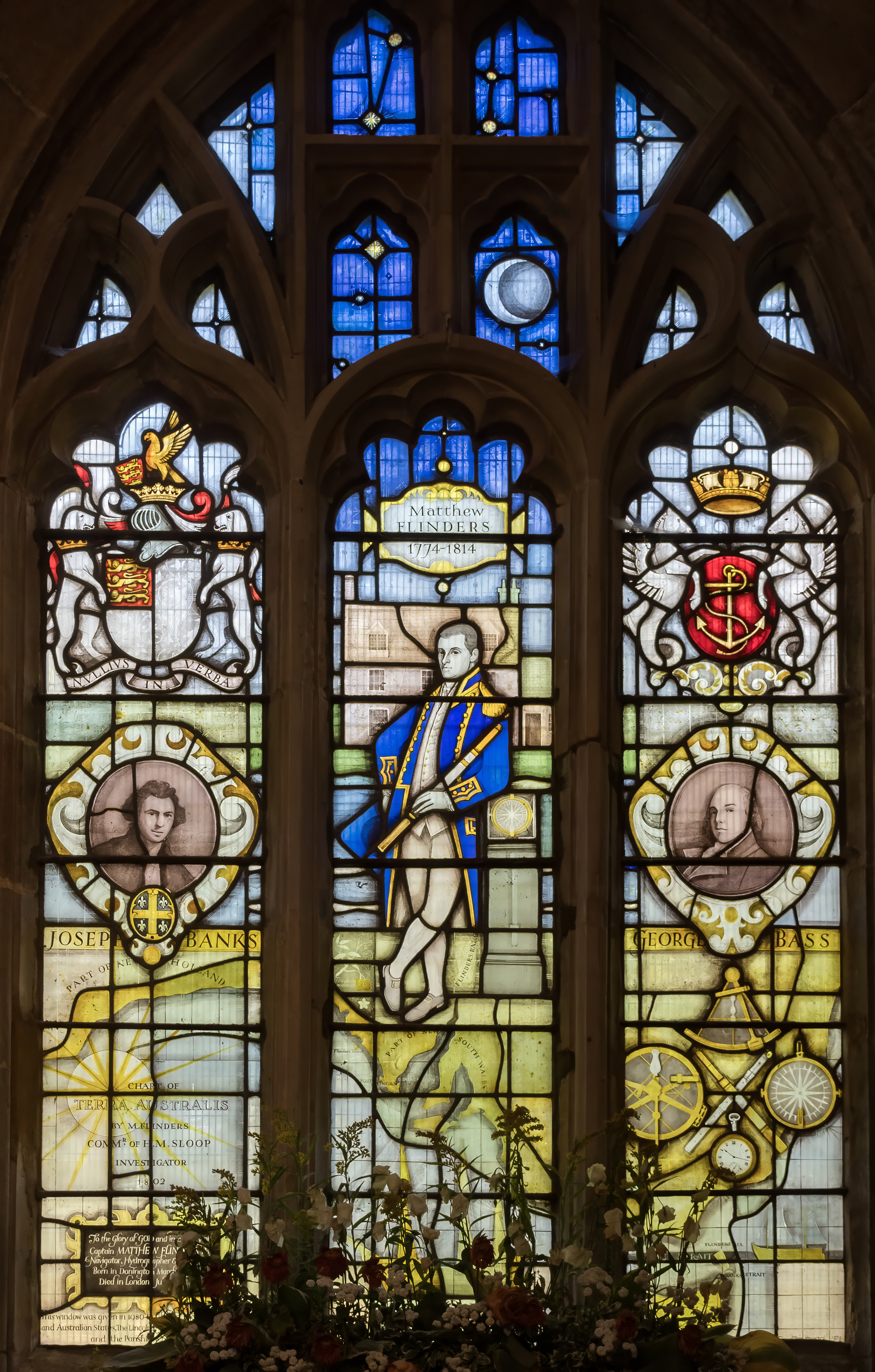
St Mary and the Holy Rood, Donington

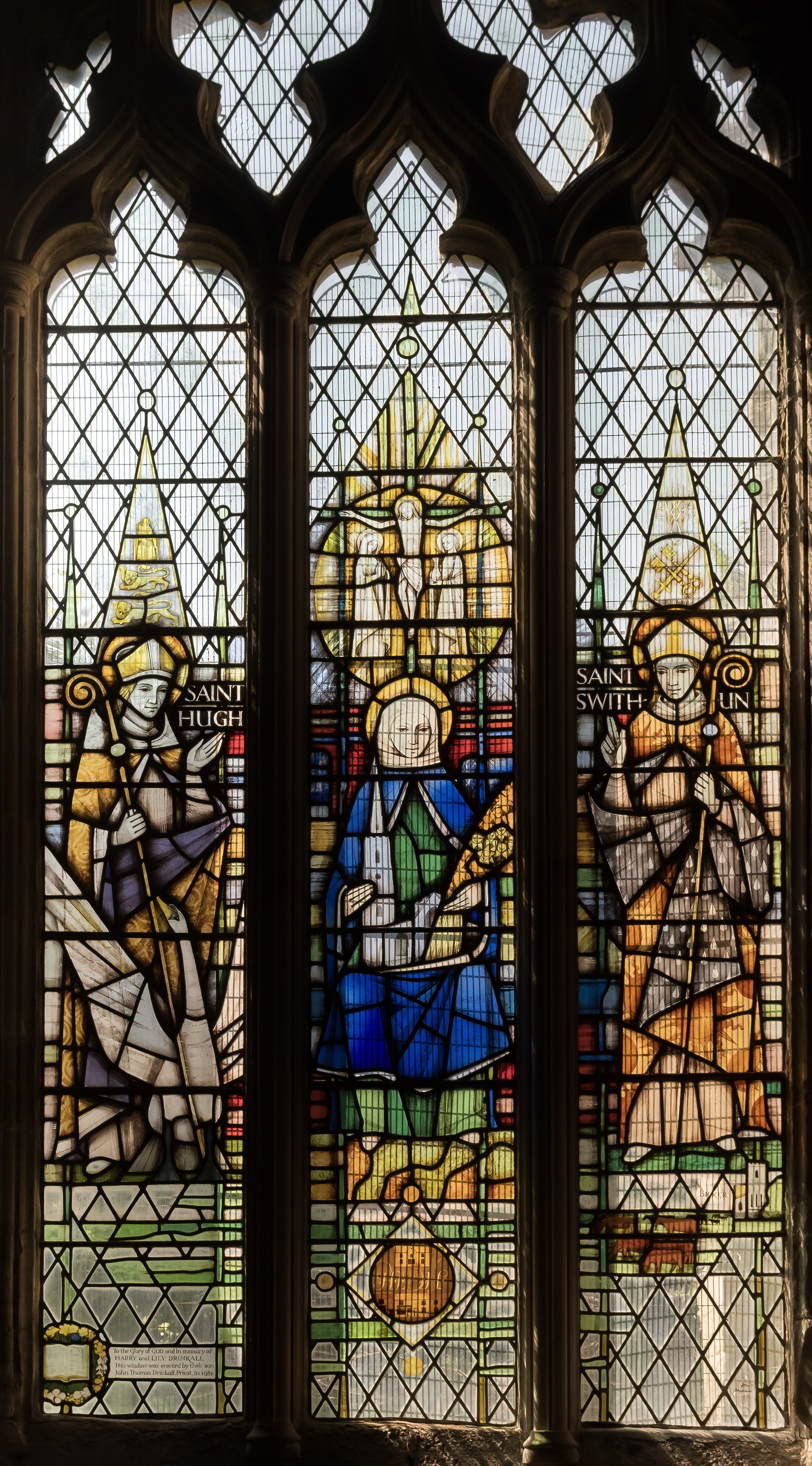
St Mary and the Holy Rood, Donington

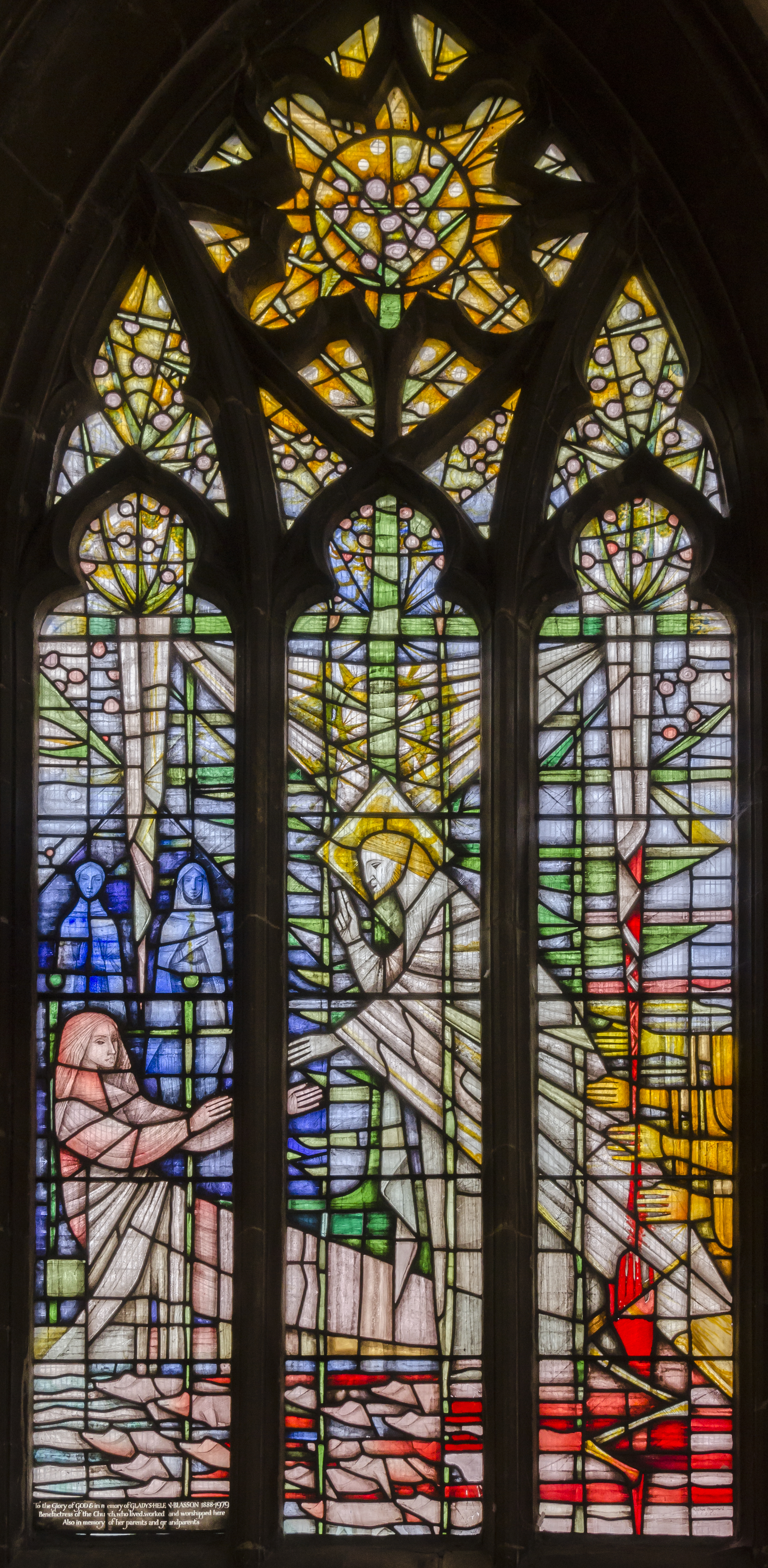
St Andrew, Billingborough

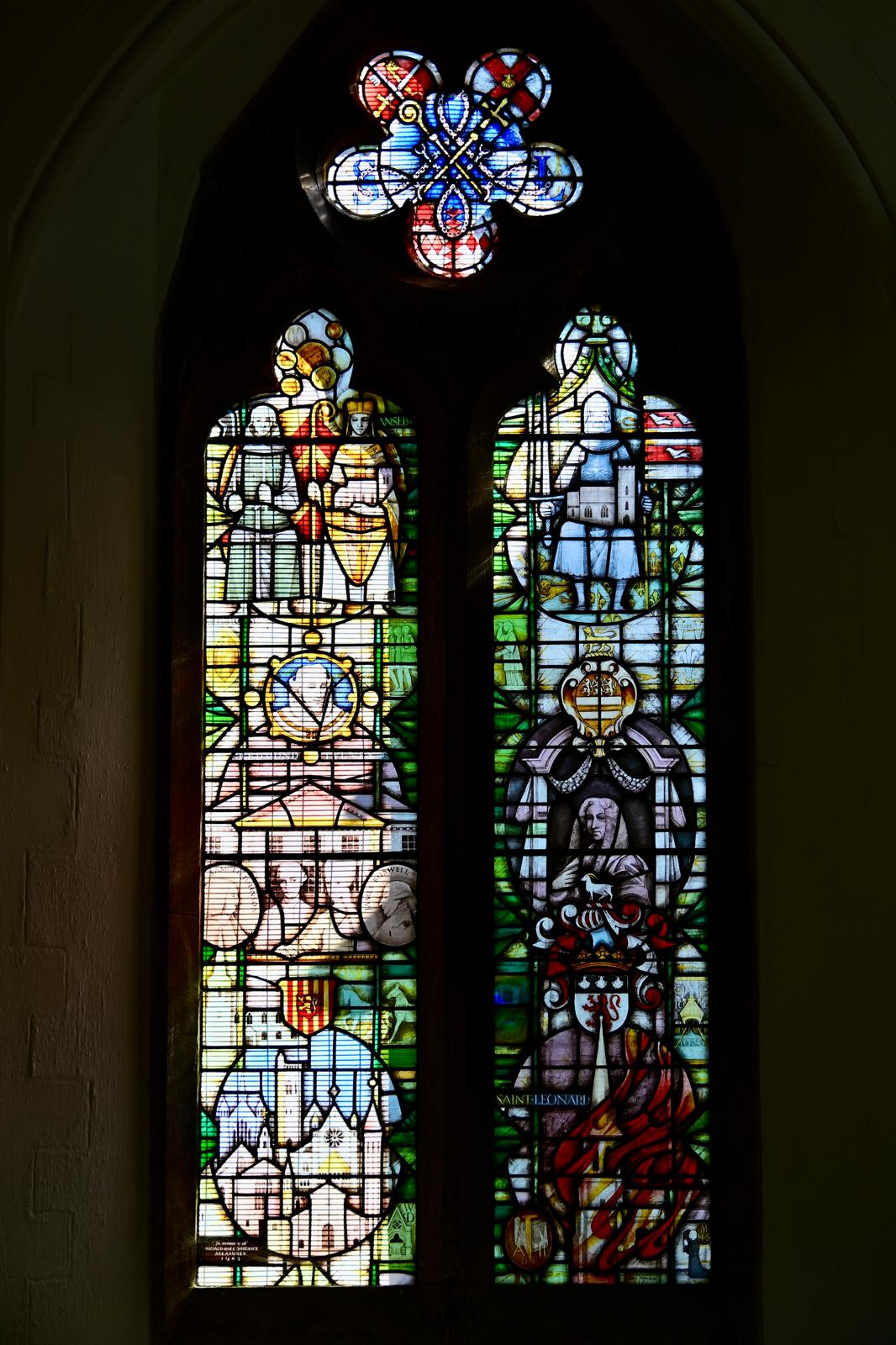
St Leonard, Streatham, north east chapel

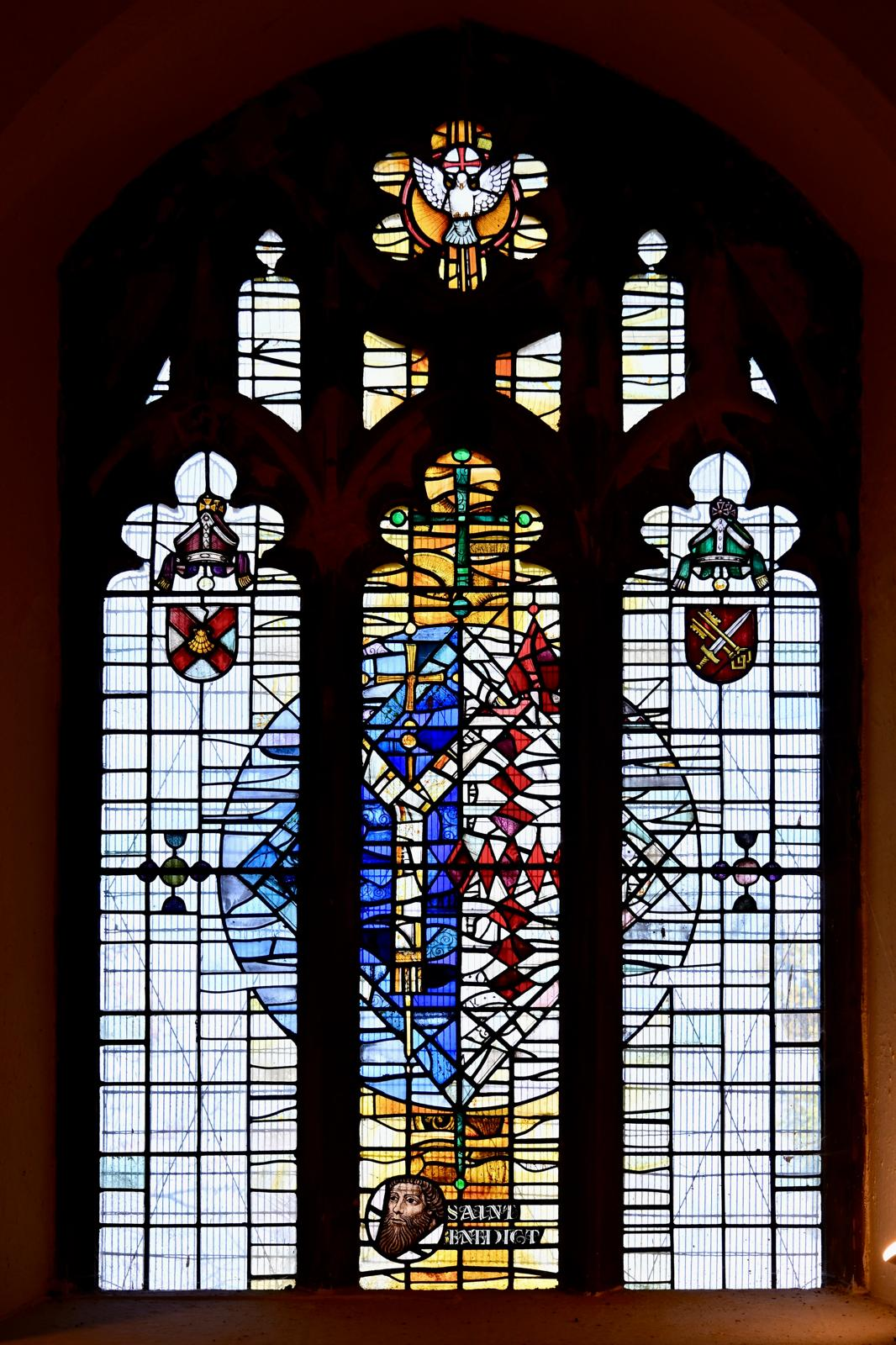
St Leonard, Streatham, west tower

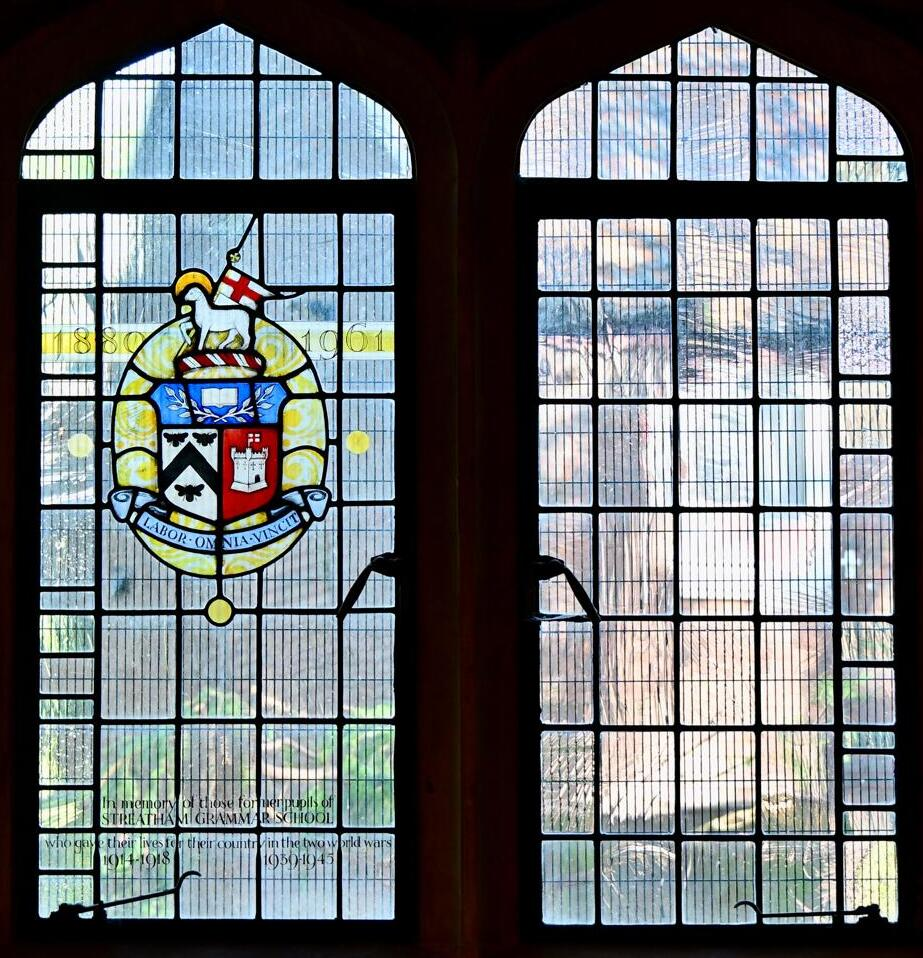
St Leonard, Streatham, narthex

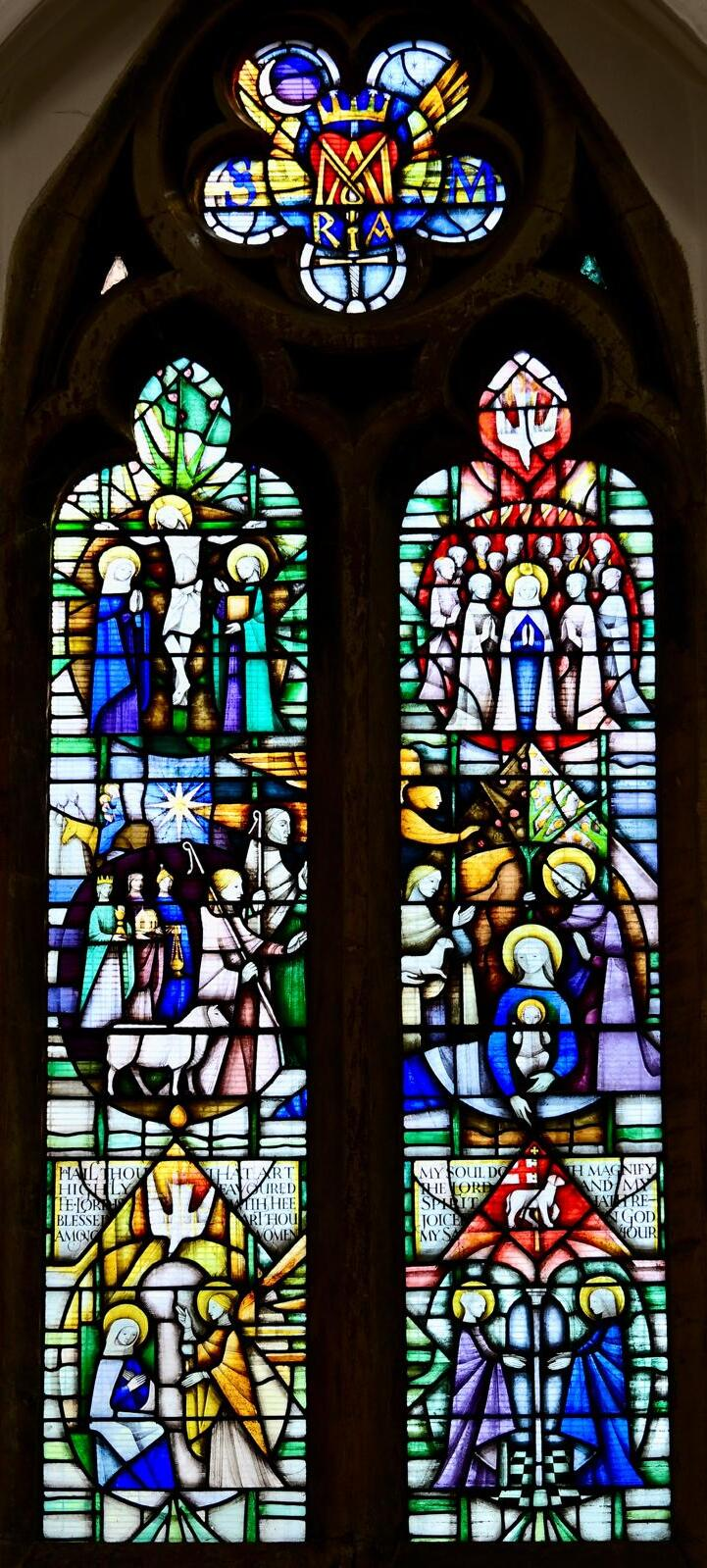
St Leonard, Streatham, Lady Chapel

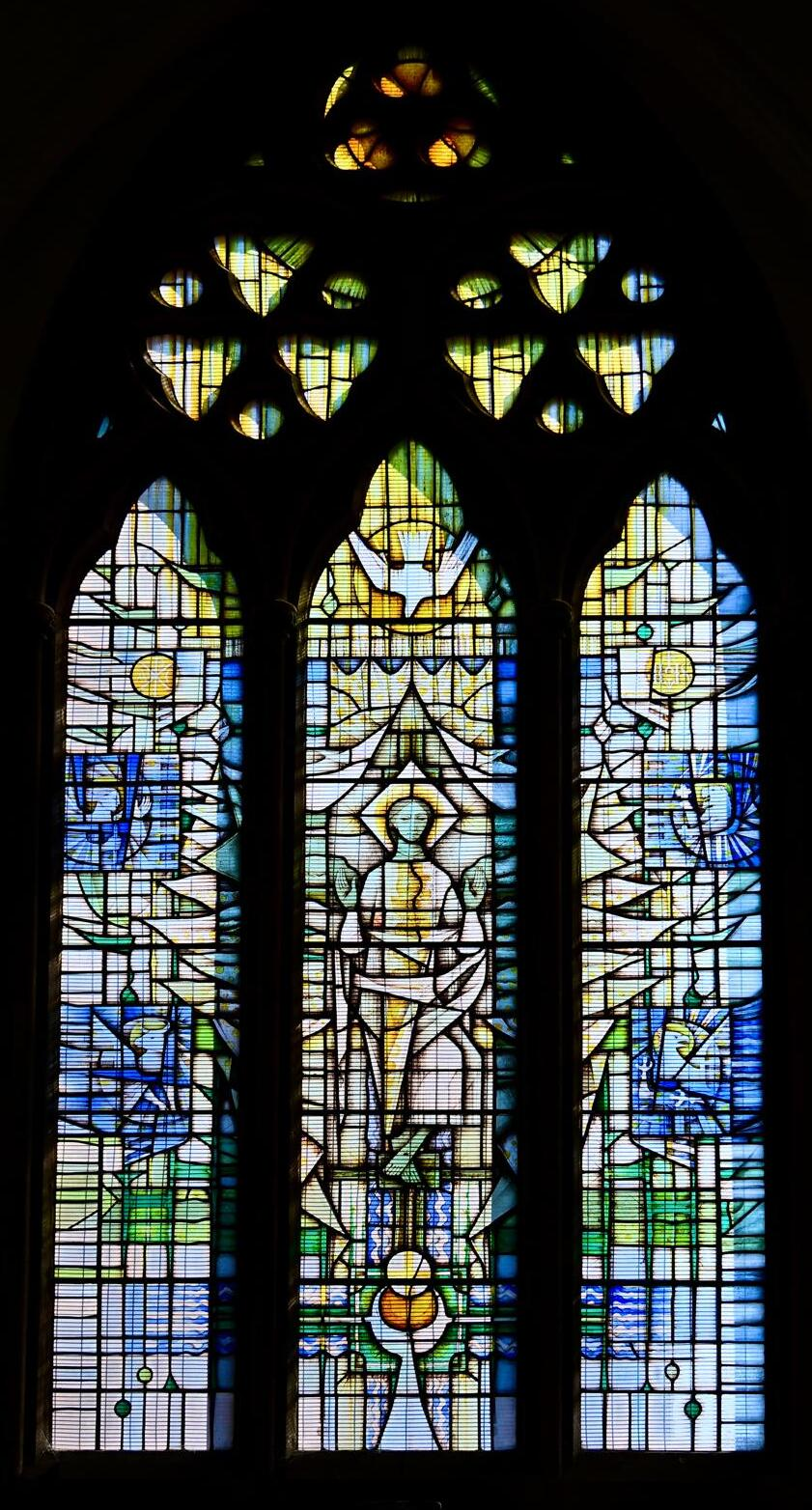
St Leonard, Streatham, east chancel

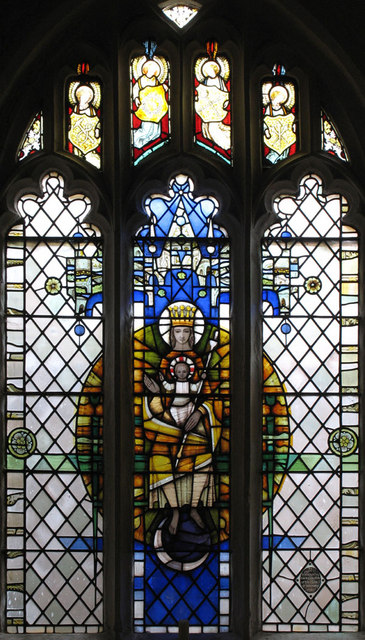
All Saints, Boxley

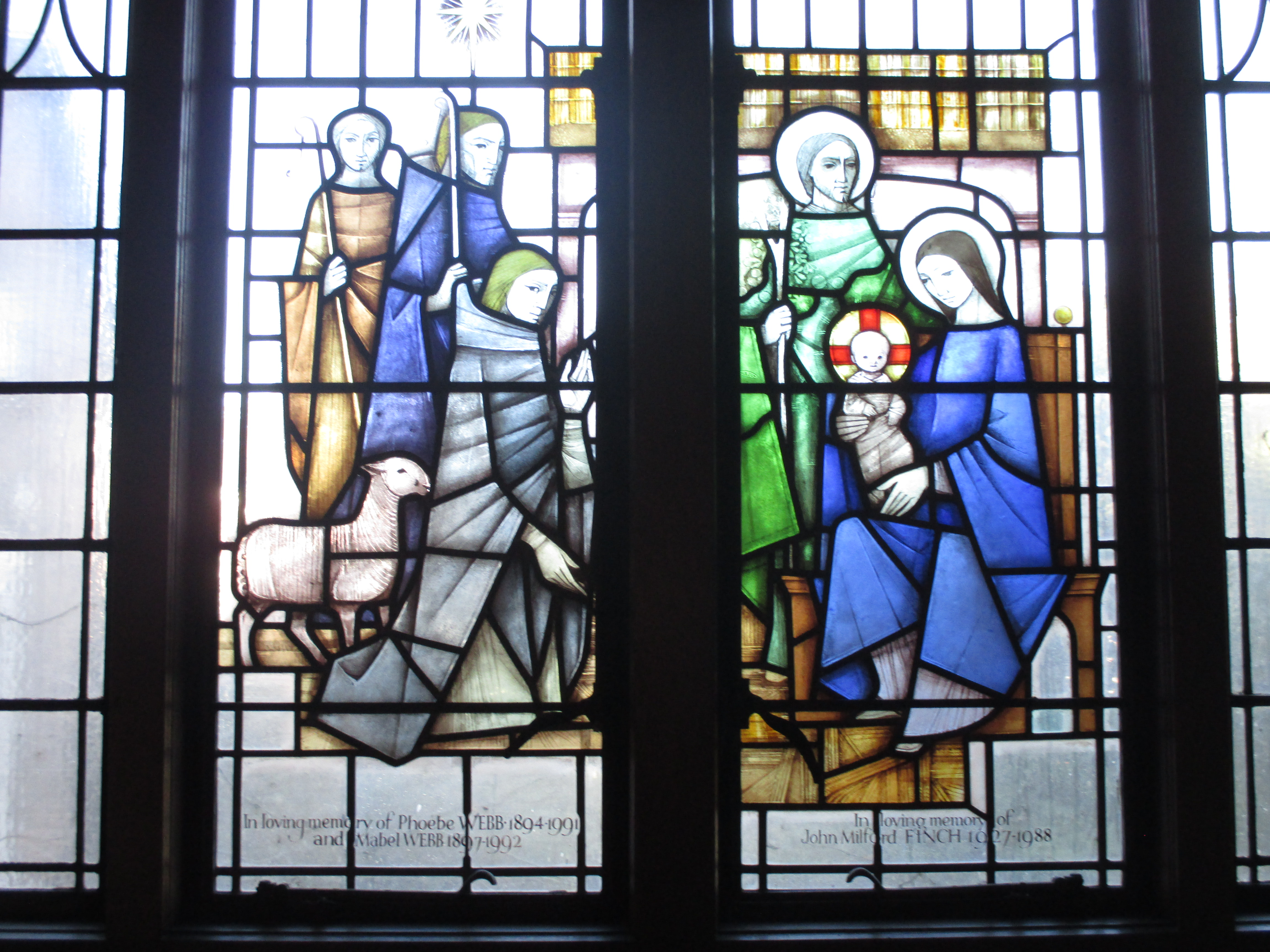
St Richard, Haywards Heath

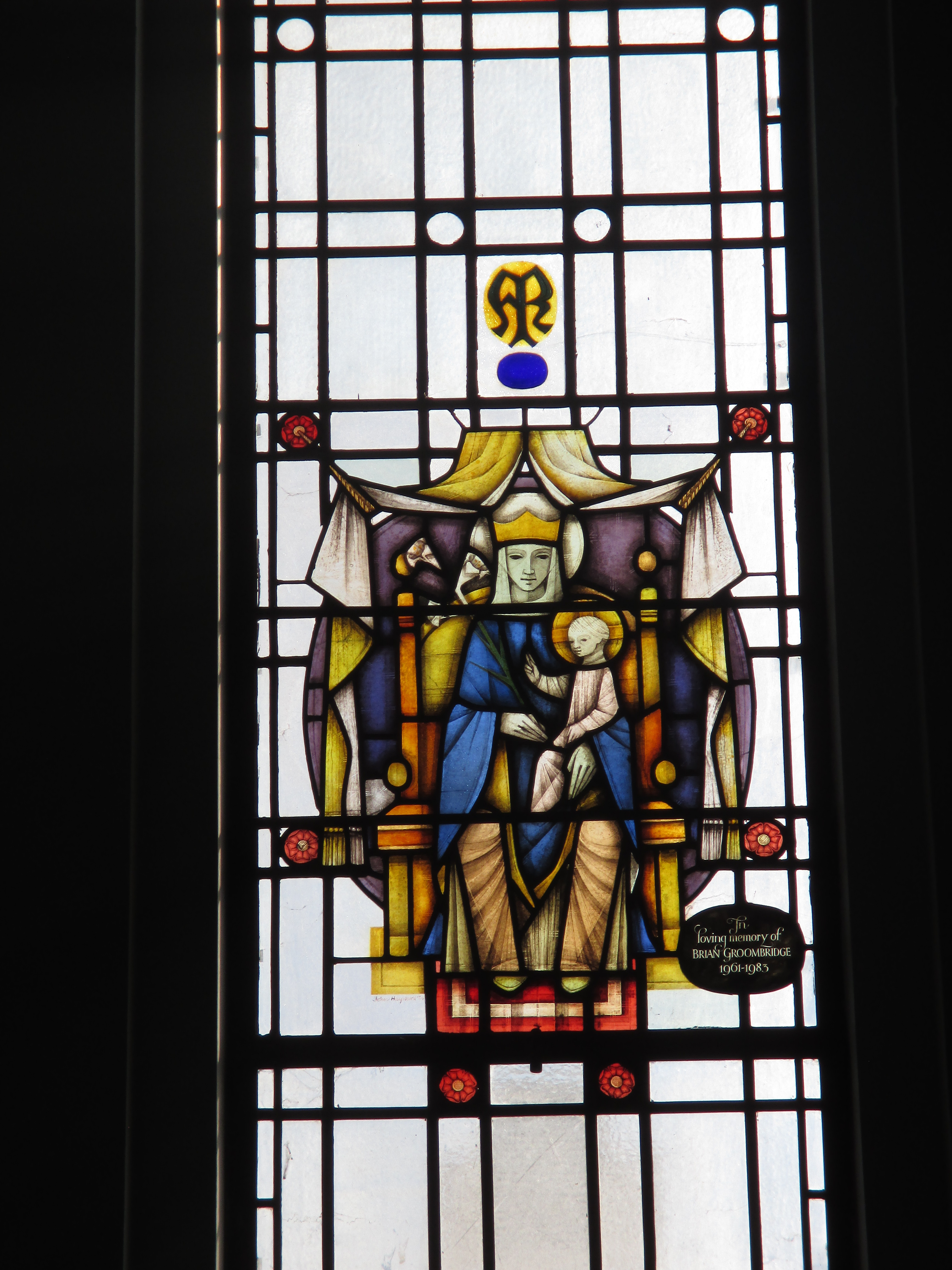
St Richard, Haywards Heath

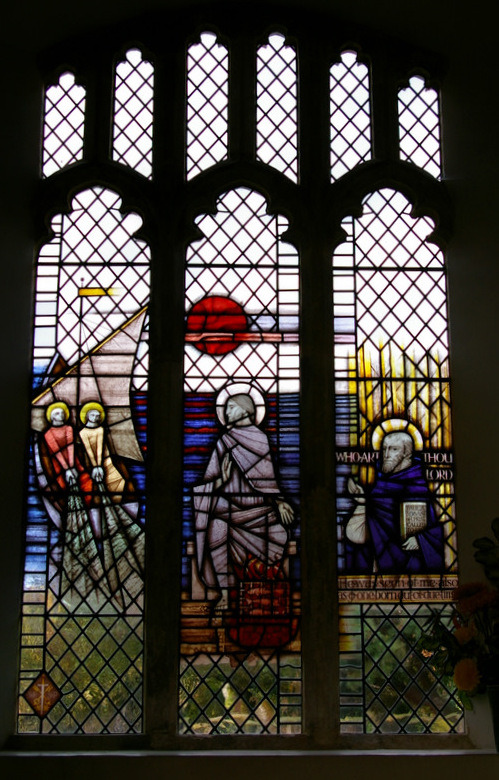
St Peter & St Paul, Edgefield

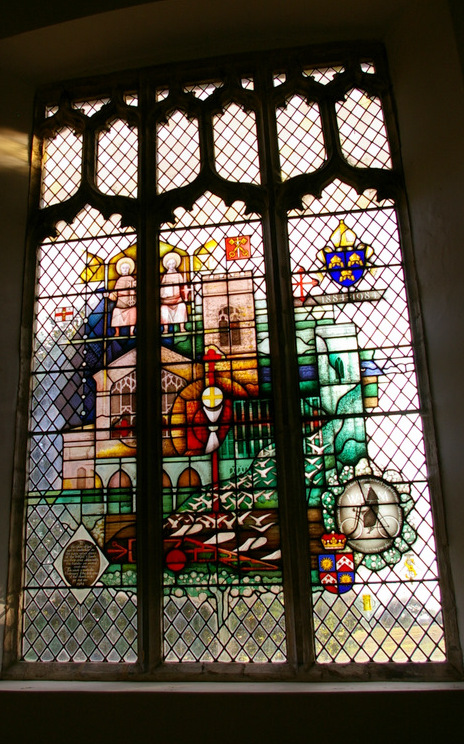
St Peter & St Paul, Edgefield

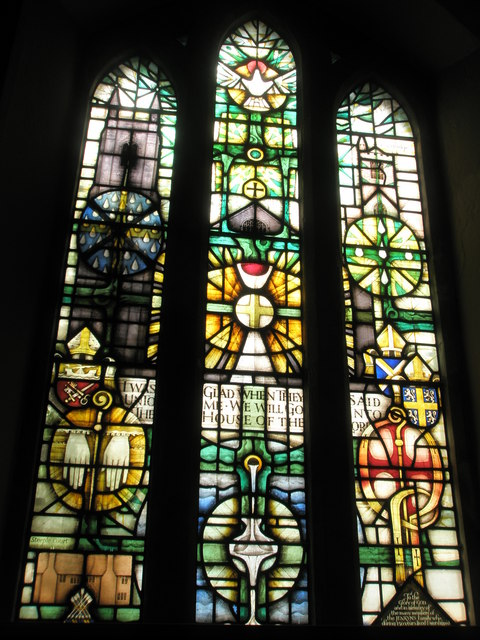
All Saints, Botley

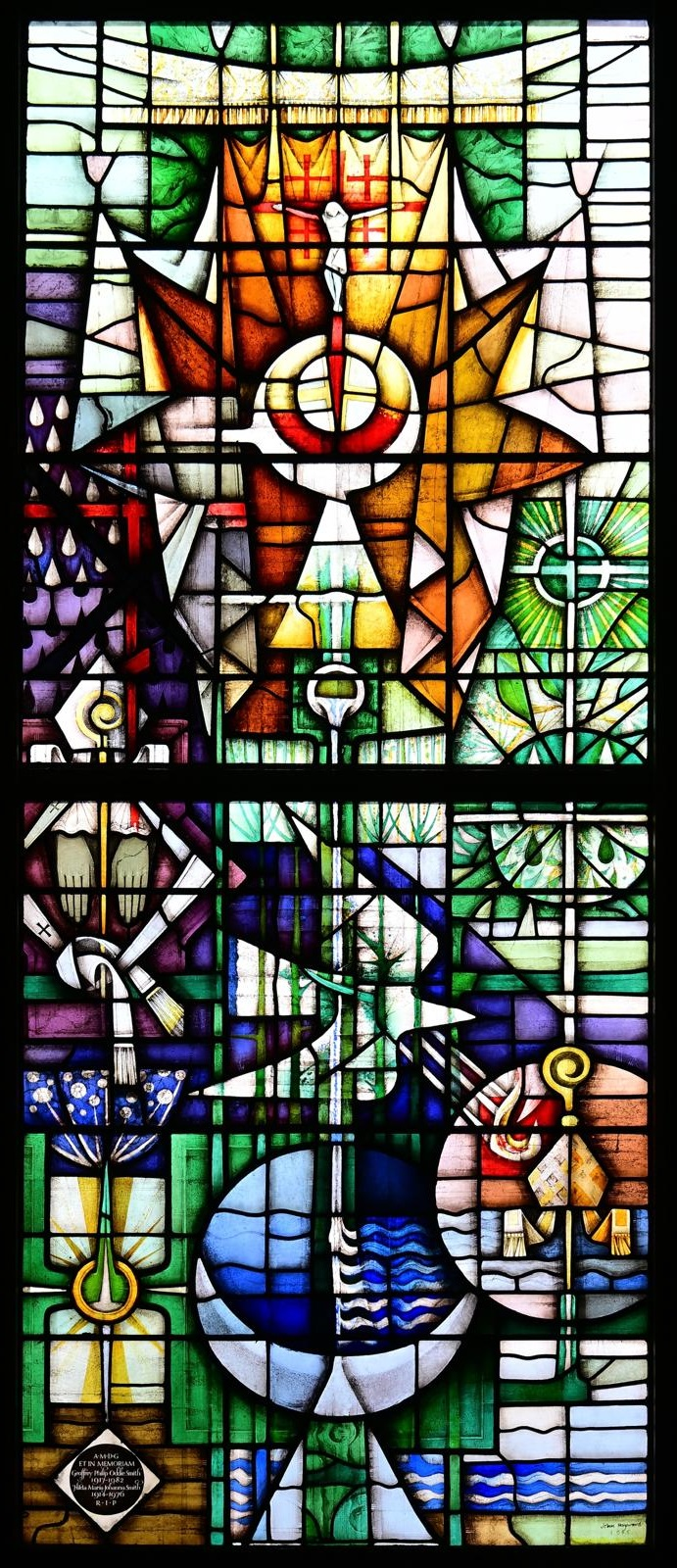
St Saviour, Little Venice

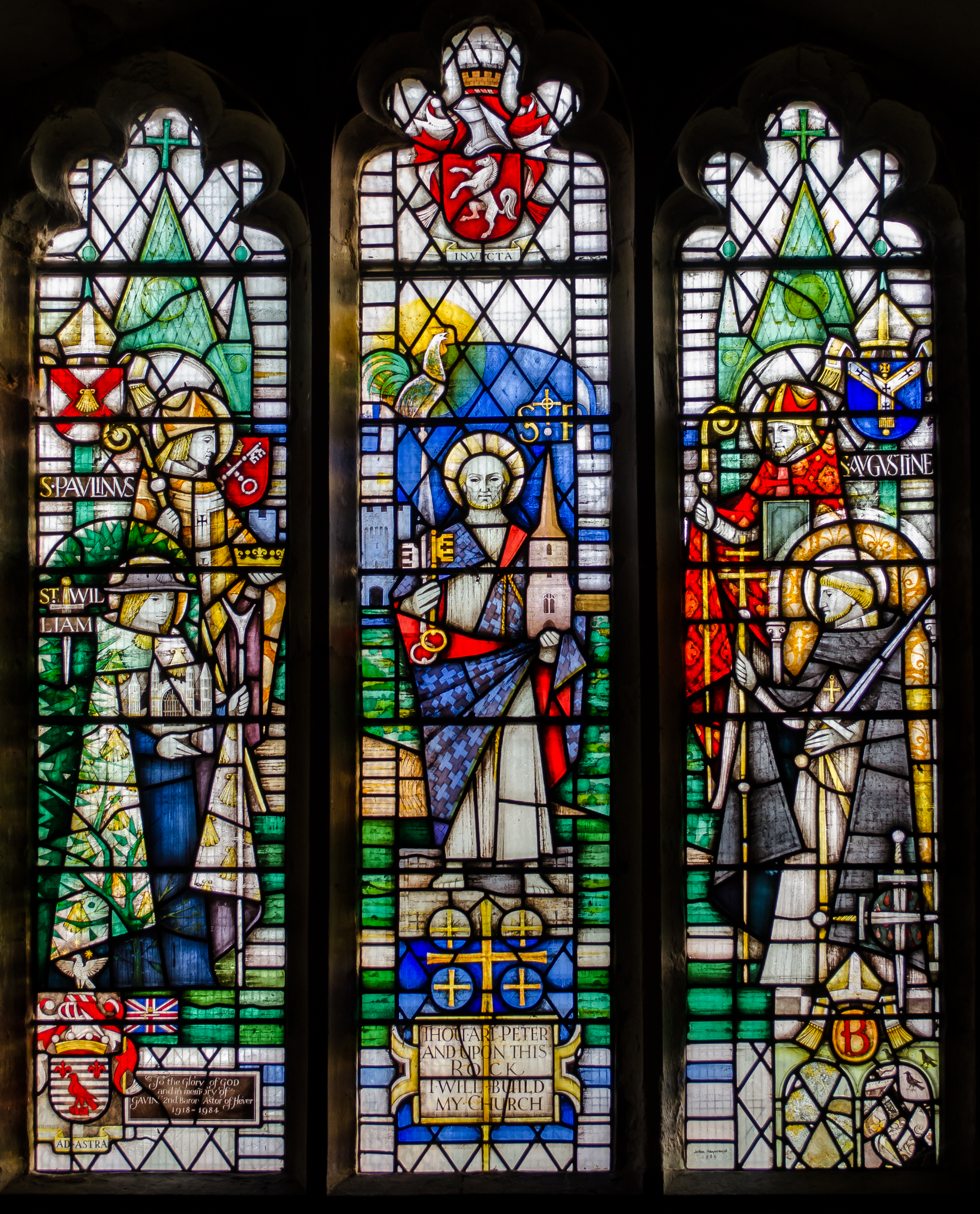
St Peter, Hever

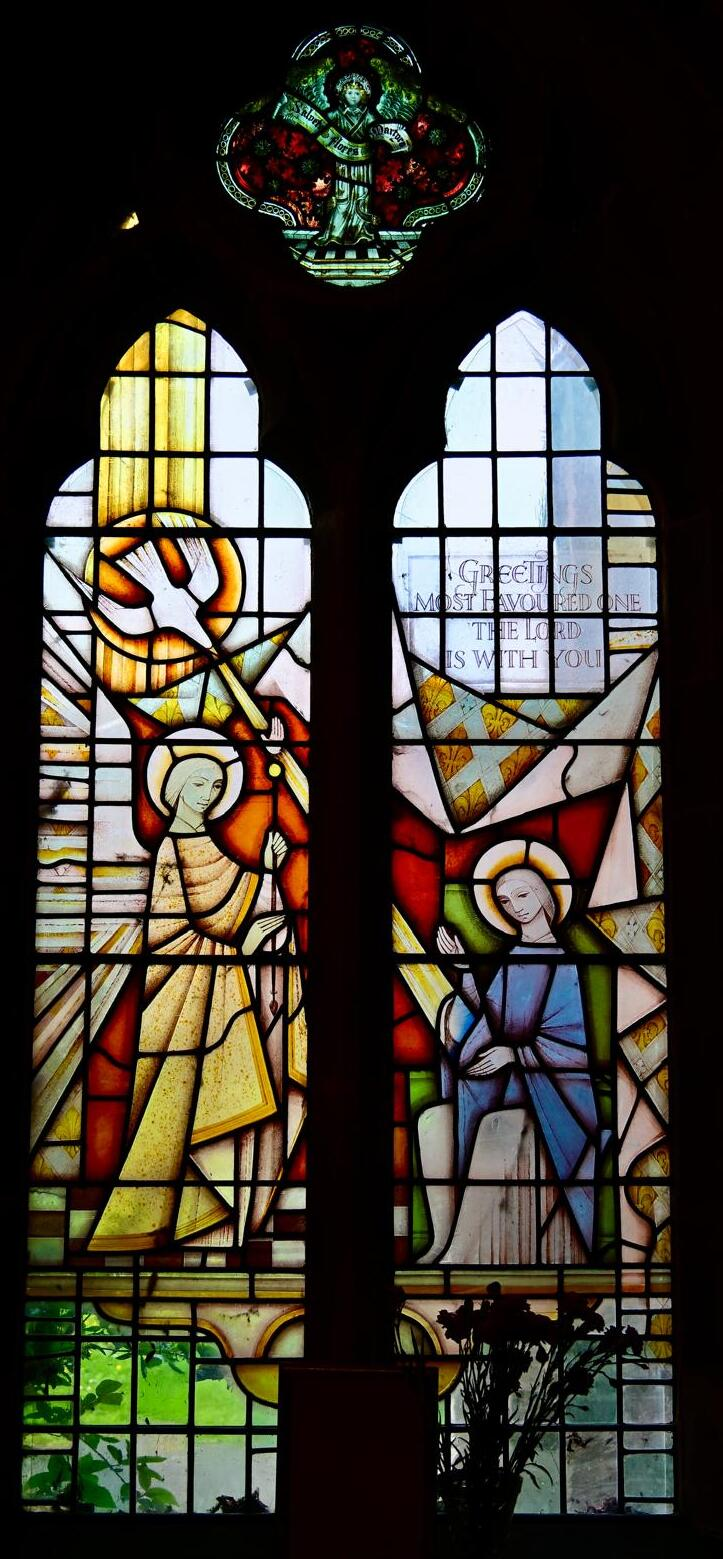
Christ Church, Swindon

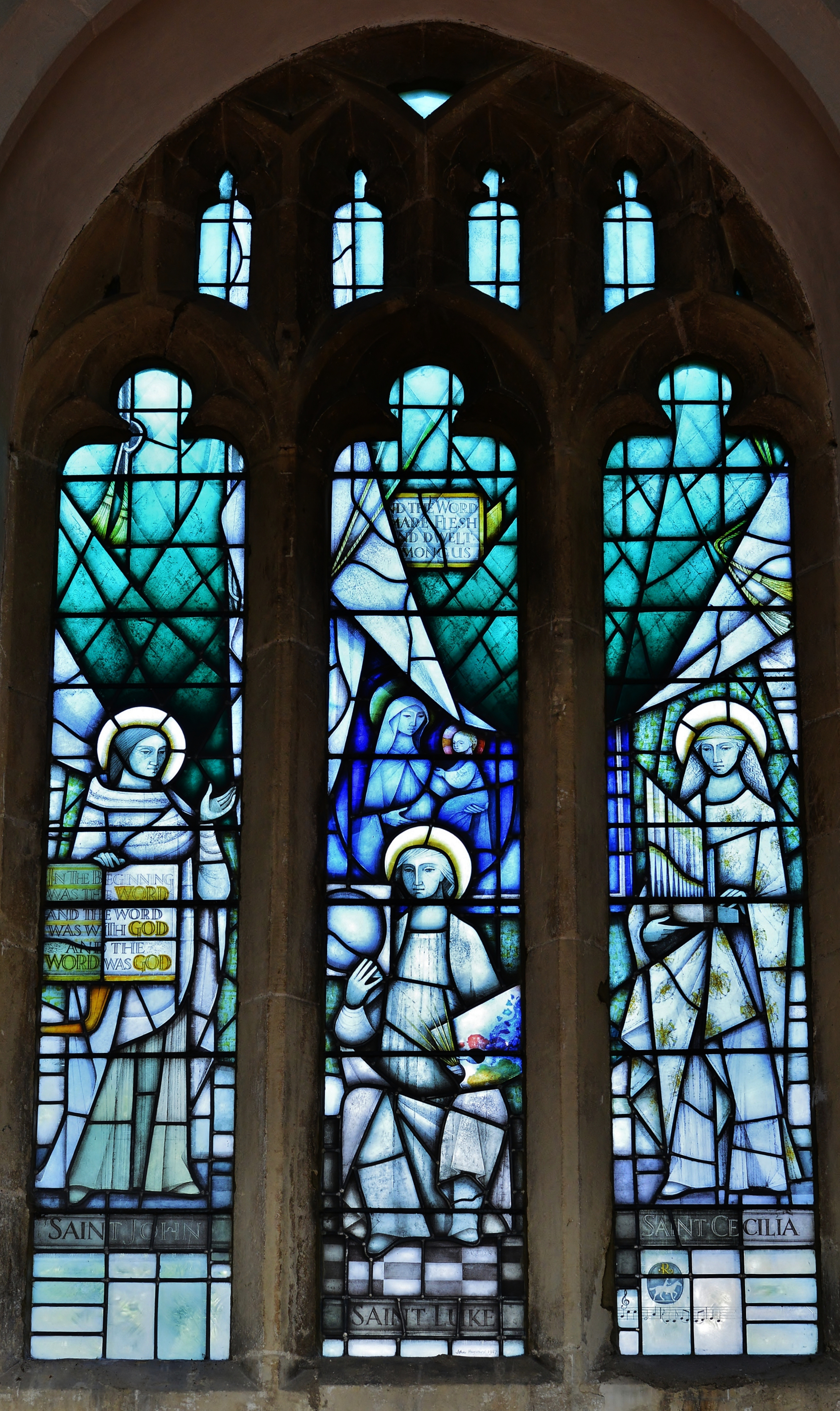
St Peter and St Paul, Checkendon

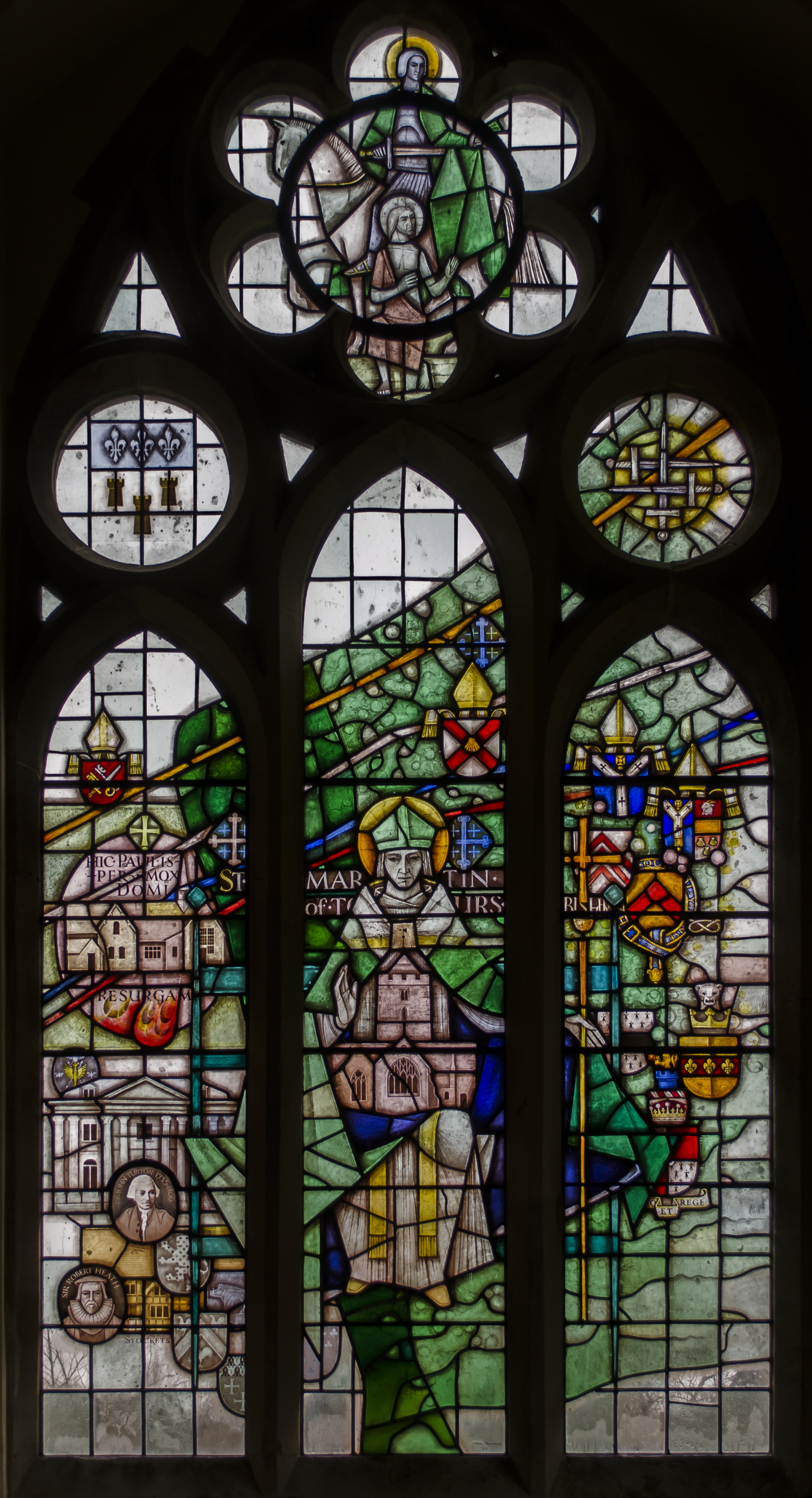
St Martin, Brasted

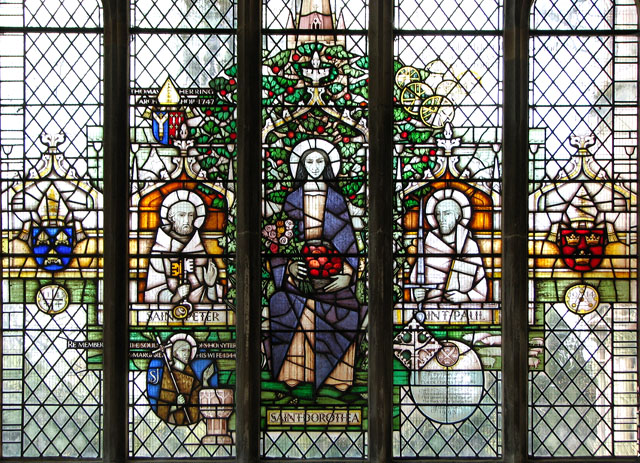
All Saints, Walsoken

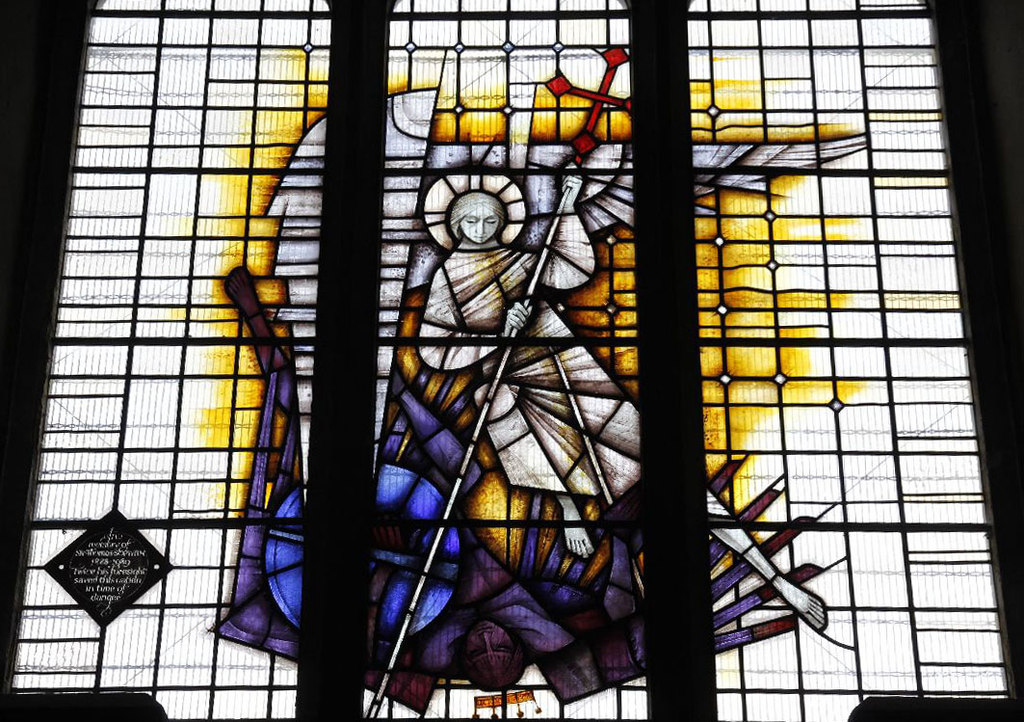
St Peter and St Paul, King's Somborne

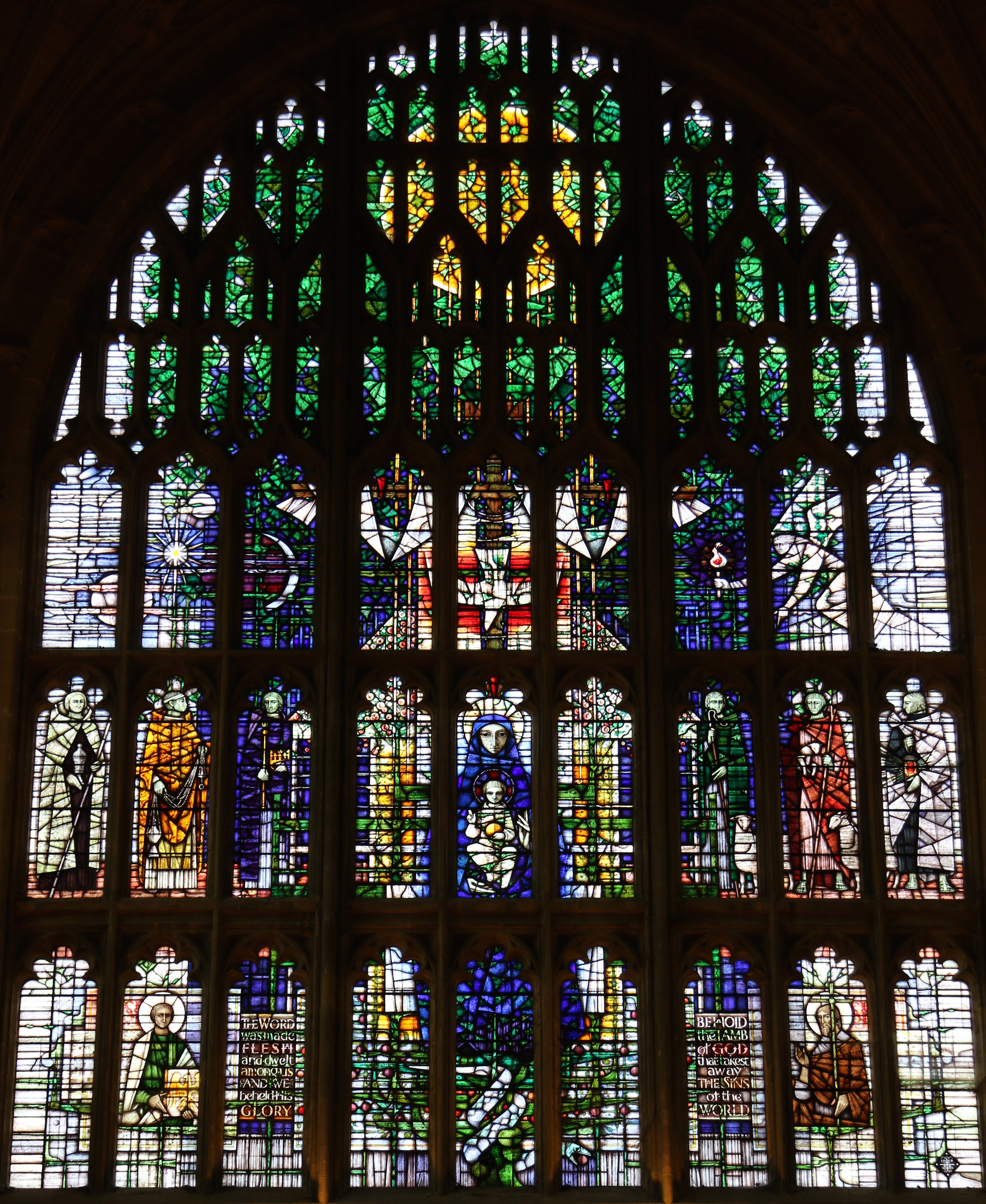
Sherborne Abbey

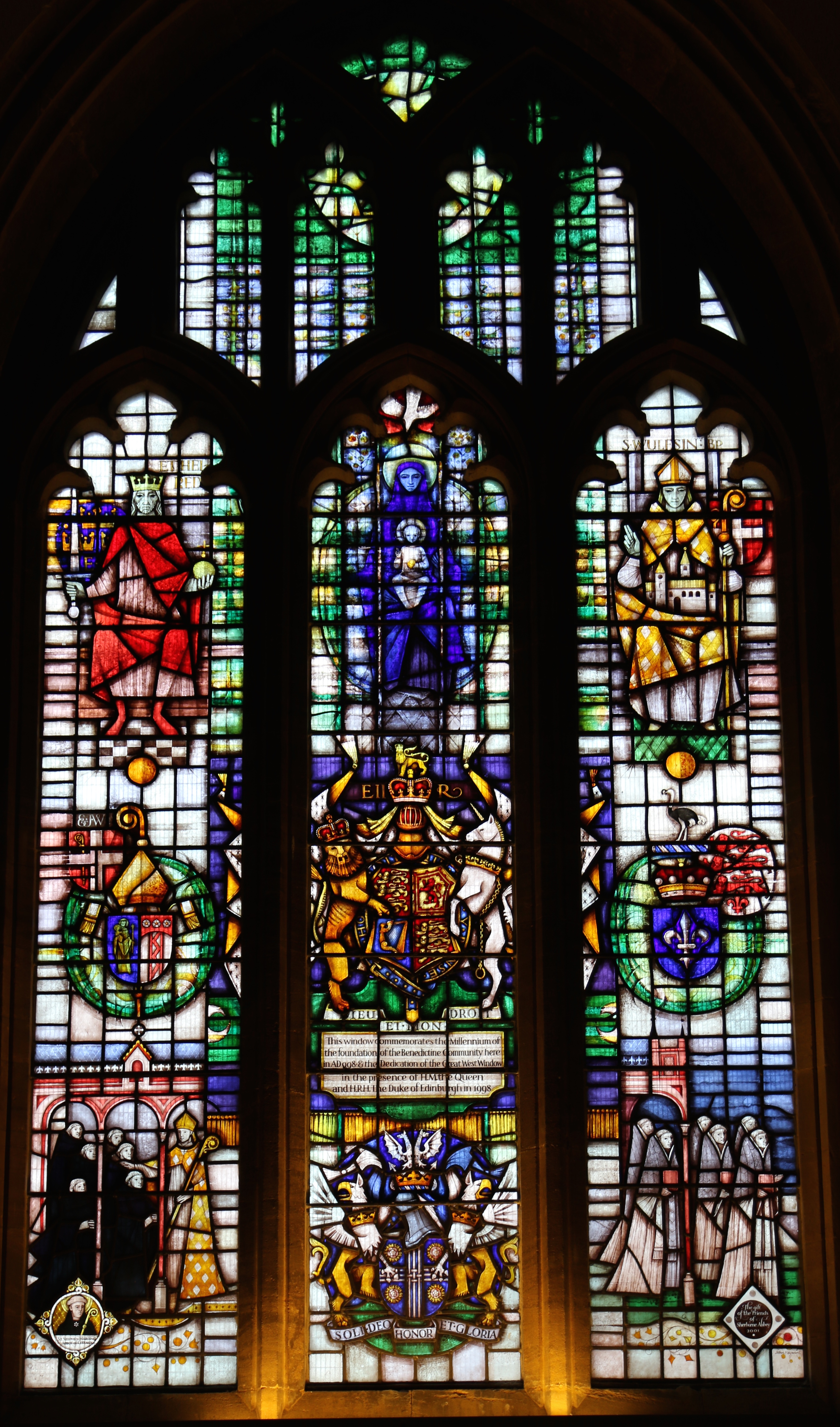
Sherborne Abbey

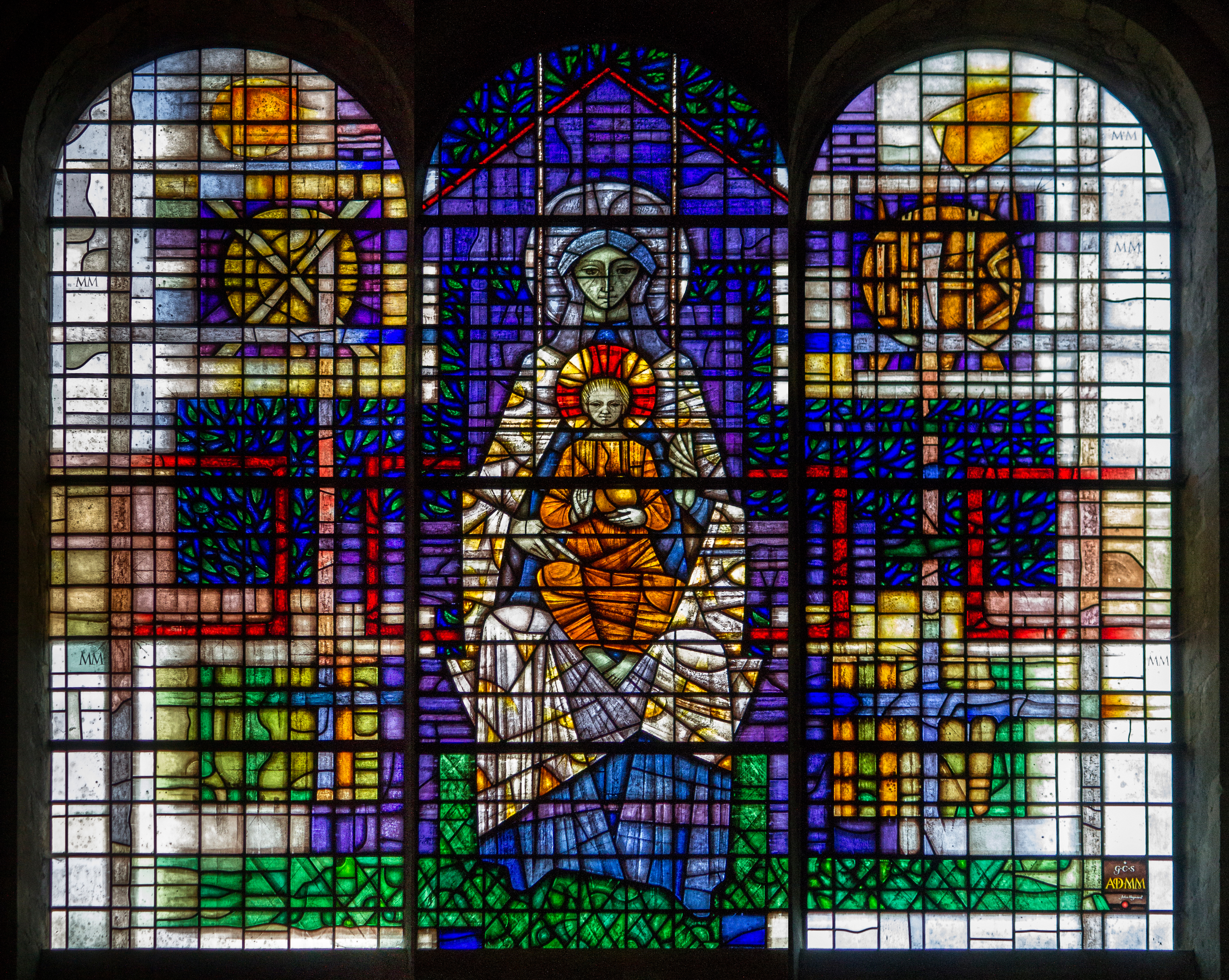
Norwich Cathedral (Composite)

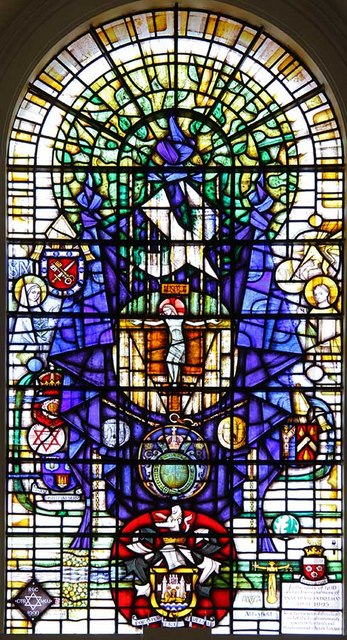
Holy Trinity, Guildford

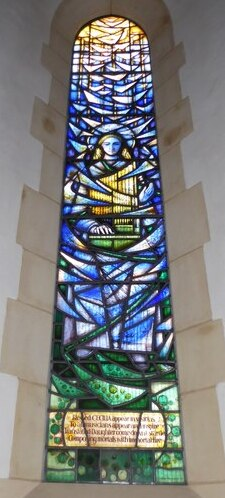
St Peter, Limpsfield
