= Avondale Square Estate =

Housing estate in Bermondsey, London, England

Avondale Square Estate is a housing estate in Bermondsey, South East London adjacent to the Old Kent road. It was constructed between 1958 and 1962 and is the largest of City of London's housing estates. The area the estate occupied belonged to the City since 1251, and was originally known as Twelve Acres.

At the centre of the square is St Philip's Church, Avondale Square, rebuilt in 1963 to a design by Nugent Cachemaille-Day following wartime bomb damage. Adjacent to the church is a sculpture, Woman and dog, by Anthony Weller.
