= Listed buildings in Manchester-M19 =

Manchester is a city in Northwest England. The M19 postcode area is to the south of the city centre, and contains the areas of Burnage, and Levenshulme. The postcode area contains five listed buildings that are recorded in the National Heritage List for England. Of these, one is listed at Grade II*, the middle grade of the three grades, and the others are at Grade II, the lowest grade. The areas are mainly residential, and all the five listed buildings are churches.

== Key ==
Grade	Criteria
II*	Particularly important buildings of more than special interest
II	Buildings of national importance and special interest

== Buildings ==
Name and location	Photograph	Date	Notes	Grade
St Peter's Church, Levenshulme; 53.44584°N 2.19087°W		1860	The church was designed by Alfred G. Fisher in Early English style, and was enlarged in 1872 and in 1896. It is in yellow sandstone with a slate roof, and consists of a nave with a clerestory, a north aisle, a north porch, a chancel with a north vestry, and a southwest steeple. The steeple has a tower with buttresses, a clock face under a V-shaped crocketed hood mould, and a broach spire with ornamental bands, and a weathervane.	II
St Margaret's Church and lych gate 53.43096°N 2.20184°W		1874–75	The church was designed by Paley and Austin in Decorated style, and initially consisted of a three-bay nave, a chancel and a south aisle. The north aisle was added in 1911, and the west bay, the baptistry and the south porch were added in 1925–26, all by the successors in the same architectural practice. The church is built in sandstone and has a tiled roof. The lych gate was built as a memorial to the First World War, and has sandstone walls, a timber frame, and a tiled roof with decorative bargeboards.	II
St Andrew's Church, Levenshulme; 53.43683°N 2.18552°W		1907–08	The church, designed by R. B. Preston in free Perpendicular style, is now redundant. It is built in speckled whitened and red brick, with dressings of red brick and red terracotta, and has a green slate roof. The church consists of a nave and a chancel in one unit, with north and south aisles, a canted apse at the west end and a small north tower with an embattled parapet and a pyramidal roof.	II
St Mark's Church, Levenshulme; 53.44570°N 2.17976°W		1908	The church was designed by C. T. Taylor in Arts and Crafts style with Art Nouveau features. It is in red brick with dressings in matt white terracotta, and a red tiled roof. The church consists of a nave, north and south aisles under separate roofs, a canted west baptistry, a chancel with a north organ house and a south chapel both continued from the aisles, and a southwest tower. The tower has three stages, diagonal buttresses, a west doorway, a clock face, and battlements.	II
St Nicholas' Church, Burnage; 53.41987°N 2.21453°W		1931–32	The church was designed by Welch, Cachemaille-Day and Lander in Modernist style, and the west bay, also by Cachemaille-Day was added in 1964. The church is built in buff brick, It consists of a nave and a chancel with an apse and a clerestory in one unit, a south aisle, a north transept, a southeast vestry and porch, and a south tower. The tower is square with a south apse. The sides of the church are divided into bays by plain piers, and there are raised bands on the clerestory and the tower. Most of the windows are rectangular and tall.	II*
