= Church of St Michael and All Angels, London Fields =

Anglican church in London, England

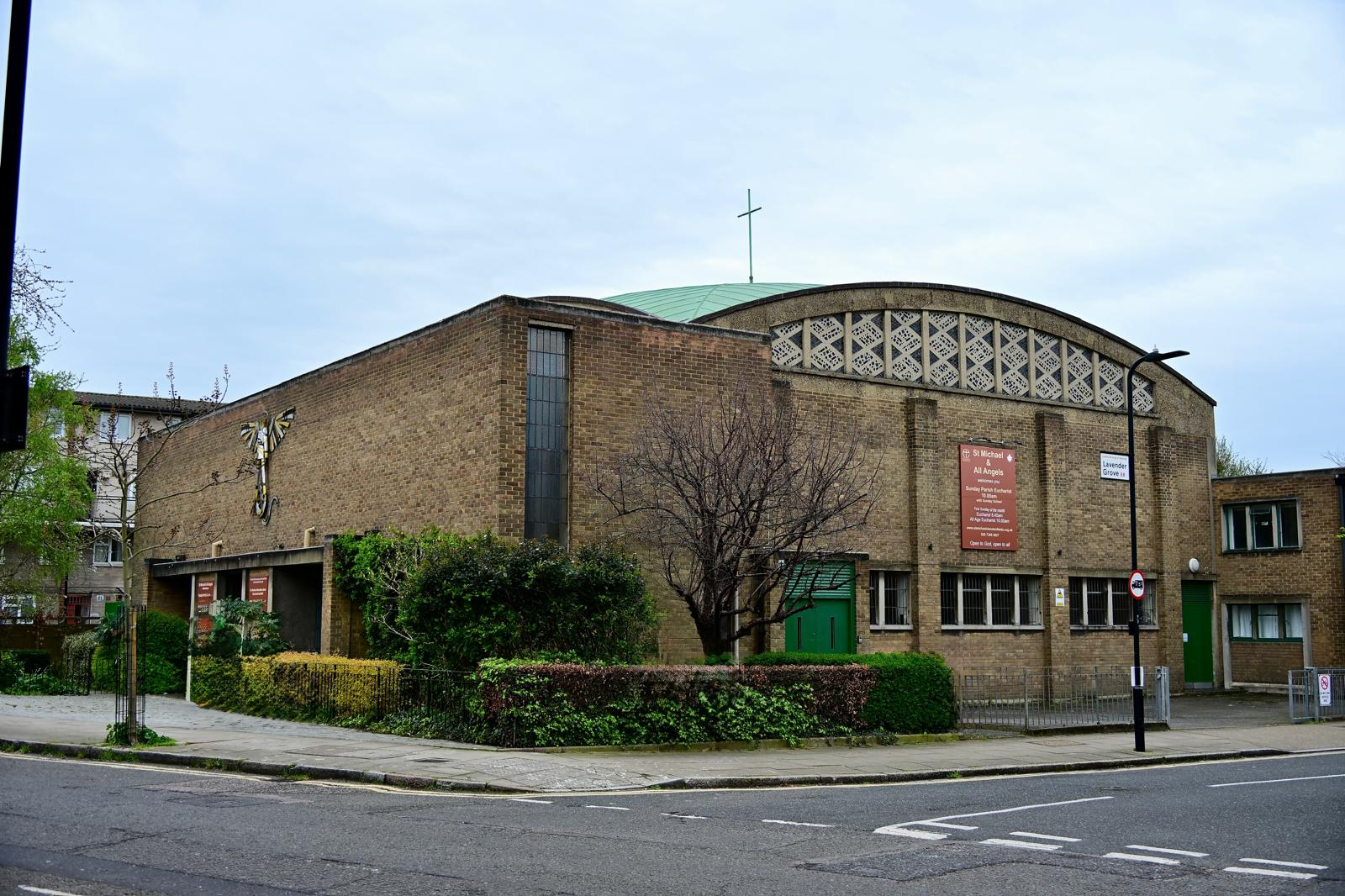
- Church of St Michael and All Angels, London Fields
- 51.5407788°N 0.0638819°W
- Location: London Fields, London
- Country: England
- Denomination: Anglican

History
- Status: Parish church

Architecture
- Functional status: Active
- Heritage designation: Grade II listed
- Designated: 2006
- Architect: Nugent Francis Cachemaille-Day
- Style: Modern
- Years built: 1959 - 1961

Administration
- Diocese: Diocese of London

The Church of St Michael and All Angels is a Church of England parish church in London Fields in the London Borough of Hackney. Built between 1959 and 1961 to the designs of Nugent Francis Cachemaille-Day, it replaced a Victorian predecessor destroyed by enemy action during the Second World War. The church is a notable example of post-war ecclesiastical architecture in England, particularly for its integral artistic programme by John Hayward. It has been Grade II listed on the National Heritage List for England since 2006.

== History ==
=== Victorian church ===
The parish of St Michael and All Angels was created in the mid-19th century as London's north eastern suburbs experienced rapid urbanisation. It was formed from parts of the parishes of St John of Jerusalem and St Jude, Bethnal Green, with a district assigned in 1865.

The first church, completed in 1864, did not occupy the present site just to the west of the green space that gives its name to the area of London Fields. It instead stood on Lamb Lane, around 400m to the east of the current church. It was designed by the Gothic Revival architect Edward Charles Hakewill in an Early English Gothic style. Constructed of ragstone with stone dressings, it comprised a chancel and aisled nave, with a south-west tower added later. The building could seat approximately 1,000 people, reflecting the needs of a rapidly growing population in the area.

The Victorian church served the Parish until 5 February 1945, when it was partially destroyed by a German V-2 rocket that detonated just to the south of the building, reducing it to a partially standing ruin. Following the church's destruction, services were temporarily held in the vicarage in Lamb Lane and later in a mission hall in Wilman Grove. Sometime after the war, the ruined building was declared structurally unsound and the site were cleared and repurposed.

=== 20th-century church ===
The present complex, including the main worship space and adjacent church hall, was built on a new site on the west side of London Fields between 1959 and 1961. Designed by the prolific church architect Nugent Francis Cachemaille-Day, its form and decoration reflect the ecclesiastical developments in architecture that arose out of the Liturgical Movement. Planned for a congregation of around 430, the design emphasises their active participation in worship and proximity to the altar and celebrant.

The new building cost £42,000 to realise and was officially opened on 11 February 1961 by the Bishop of London, the Rt. Rev. H. C. Montgomery Campbell. The artistic programme undertaken by John Hayward was installed between 1961 and 1962. This was financed partly from church building funds and partly by the Edwin Austin Abbey Memorial Trust Fund, which included a £3,000 donation that covered the cost of Hayward's six murals installed on the north and south walls. The murals were dedicated on 28 September 1962 by the Bishop of Stepney, the Rt. Rev. Francis Lunt.

In 1971 the parish was united with that of St Paul, Haggerston, following which the Victorian church of St Paul was closed and demolished. Since then, the formal title of the parish has been the 'united benefice of St Michael & All Angels London Fields with St. Paul's Haggerston.

On 24 March 2006 the church was granted Grade II listed status on the National Heritage List for England. It is described in its official list entry as a bold and distinctive church that represents a comprehensively thoughtful and high-quality design of the post-war period.

Conservation work on all nine murals by Hayward was completed by the Wall Paintings Workshop in 2010.

== Architecture, fixtures and fittings ==
=== Exterior ===
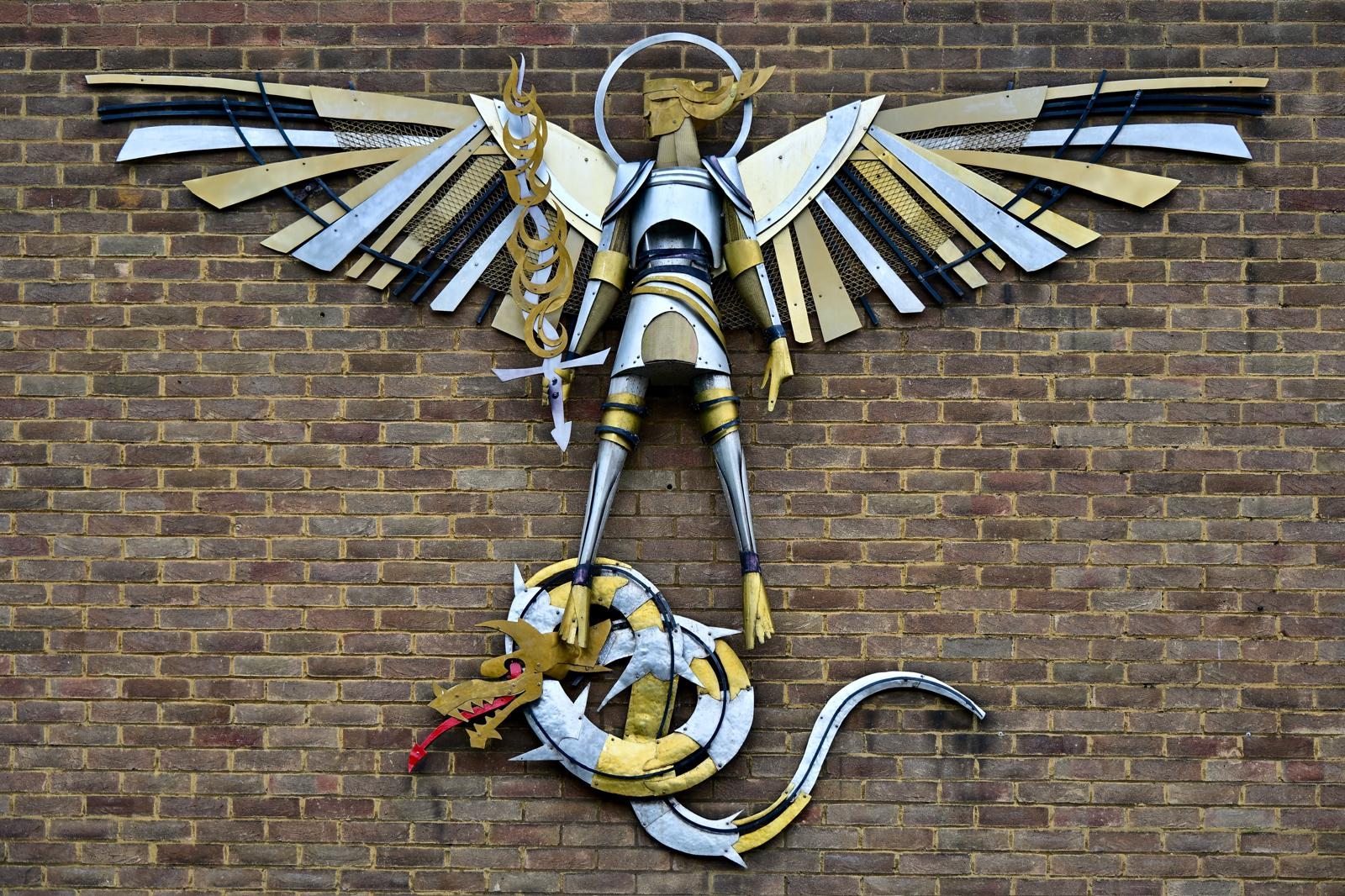
Sculpture above entrance by John Hayward (1961–62)

The church of St Michael and All Angels is built on a square plan, with a narthex positioned to the east and a church hall to the west. Its primary construction material is red engineering brick, with a reinforced concrete dome that forms the roof. The exterior is functional and restrained, consciously lacking the imposing grandeur of the Gothic revival churches favoured by preceding generations. It has no tower nor belfry and, as a result, is not prominent above the rooflines of its surrounding buildings. The main entrance is from the east, meaning that the liturgical orientation of the church is reversed, with the congregation facing west towards the altar.

The design of the church was driven by both liturgical and economic considerations. Cachemaille-Day was a proponent of the stripped-down aesthetics of modernism in architecture and had been an early experimenter with the principles of church planning that were recommended by the Liturgical Movement after the Second World War. These were concerned with congregational participation and proximity to the altar, which the quadrangular space is designed to encourage. Cachemaille-Day was also well versed in experimenting with materials such as concrete and steel in order to achieve cost savings, necessary in a climate of post-war economic exhaustion that necessitated a more general architectural trend towards functional form.

The exterior is enlivened by a wall-mounted steel and copper sculpture positioned above the main entrance. It portrays a winged St Michael — flaming sword in hand — triumphant over the Devil, who take the form of a dragon-headed serpent coiled beneath the Archangel's feet. It is the first of a series of artworks by Hayward encountered by the visitor, part of his integrated artistic programme for the church that was installed between 1961 and 1962 and continues on the inside. It forms a fundamental part of Cachemaille-Day's overall scheme.

=== Interior ===
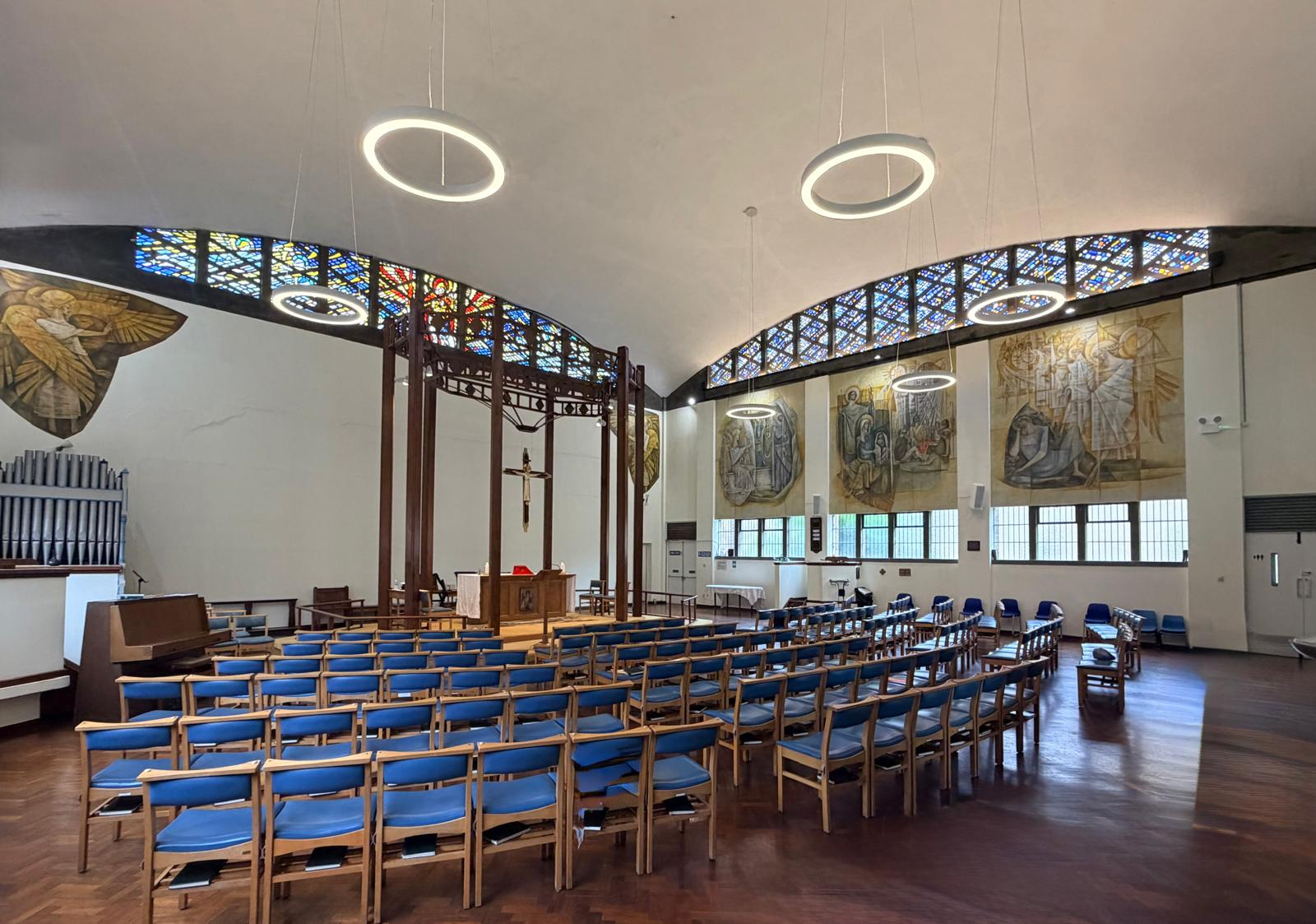
St Michael and All Angels, interior view

Entry into St Michael and All Angels is via a lobby that, with a side chapel to the south and vestry to the north, effectively forms a narthex preceding the main space. Above the lobby is recessed gallery. Otherwise, the space is defined by its open and flexible square plan. The walls and shallow dome are painted white and lit by four spans of coloured clerestory glazing, one to each side immediately below the curved roofline and an additional row of three low clear glazed windows to north and south. Flexible seating is normally organised in a semi-circular arrangement around the freestanding altar positioned in front of the west wall.

Cachemaille-Day was responsible for several key decorative elements of the interior that define its aesthetic character. The predominantly abstract patterns of the clerestory glazing are executed in dalle de verre, a technique in which thick pieces of coloured glass are set in thick concrete frame, an early British example of a practice more commonly seen in France. Behind the altar the glass becomes figurative, where an image of St Michael forms a visual focal point. The altar itself, also designed by Cachemaille-Day, is positioned on a slightly raised elongated octagon, which is covered by a tall open-framed baldachin made from hardwood. From it hangs a carved polychrome Crucifix, the work of Hayward. An Orthodox icon is attached to the altar frontal.

Hayward's extensive collection of works for the church are most evident in the six large square-format murals positioned on the north and south walls, three to each side. Designed specifically for their locations, they individually depict the biblical scenes of Adam and Eve being cast out of the Garden of Eden, Jacob's Ladder, the Annunciation to Mary, the Nativity and Annunciation to the Shepherds, the Agony in the Garden, and the Empty Tomb. The presence of angels creating a thematic link between each mural and the church's dedication. They were made using the marouflage technique, which involved each mural being painted in Hayward's studio before being adhered directly to the walls of the church. The modern stylised figures and muted palette of blues, greens, and golds are characteristic of the stained glass for which Hayward would become best known. When installed, they were described as the largest set of modern murals anywhere in the world.

Made using the same technique are Hayward's two broadly triangular murals of angels positioned in each corner of the west wall, effectively framing the alter when viewed from the entrance. The original plan had been to depict the four angels of the Apocalypse, but the scheme was not fully realised.

The final mural — though the first that Hayward completed — is positioned at ground level between the entrance doors and immediately behind Cachemaille-Day's steel baptismal font. It differs in technique and style from the others, painted on canvas treated with aluminium foil. It shows the Baptism of Jesus, with John the Baptist holding a cross-shaped stave and scallop shell, and a dove representing the Holy Spirit above Jesus' head.

Either side of the entrance doors are twelve stained glass panels, six to each side, also part of Hayward's complete artistic scheme for the interior. Each panel shows one of the twelve apostles of Christ. They form two glass screens that separate the side chapel and vestry from the main worship space and are realised in part-coloured, part-clear glass with silver stain detailing.

== Gallery ==
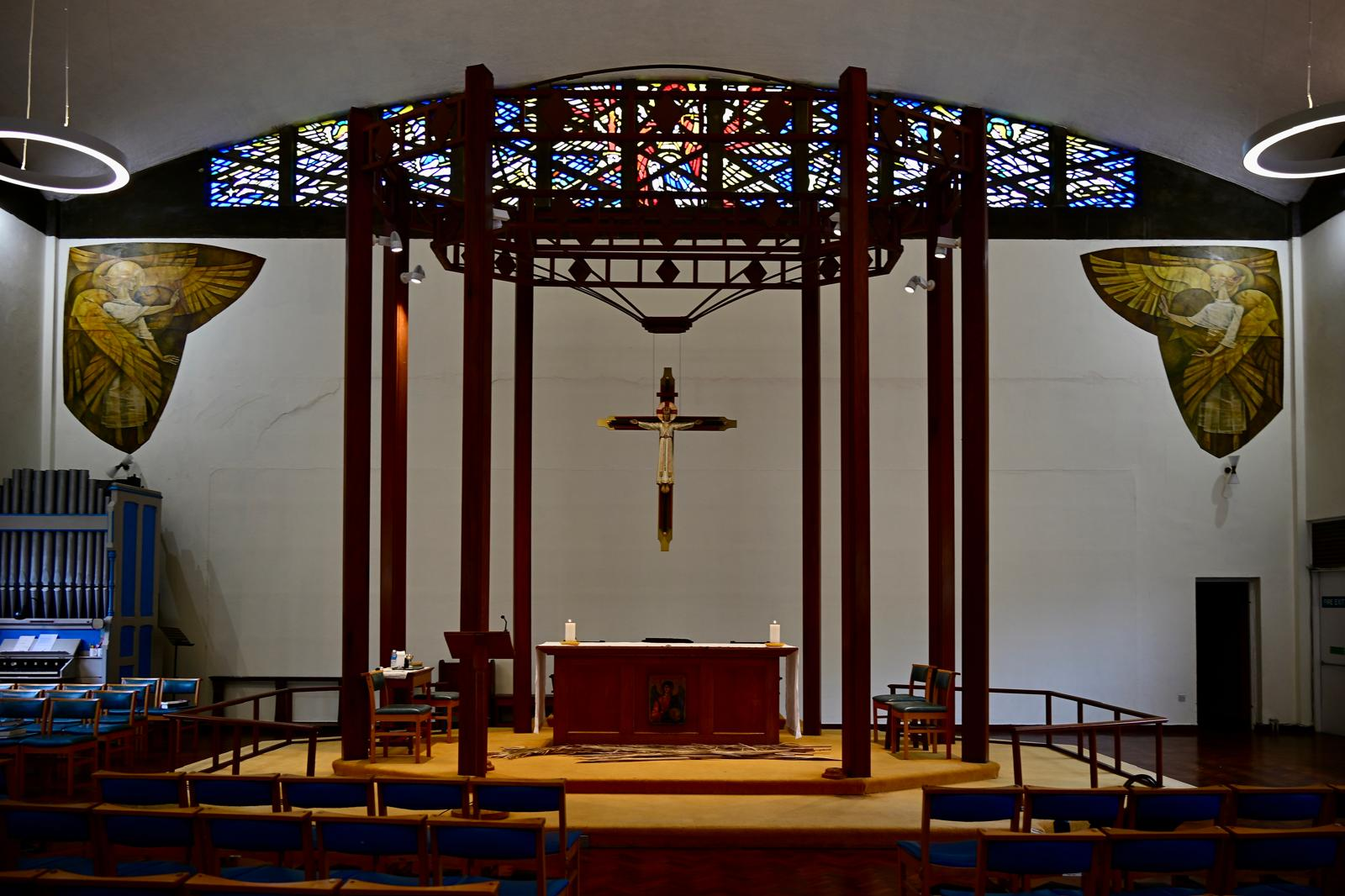
High altar

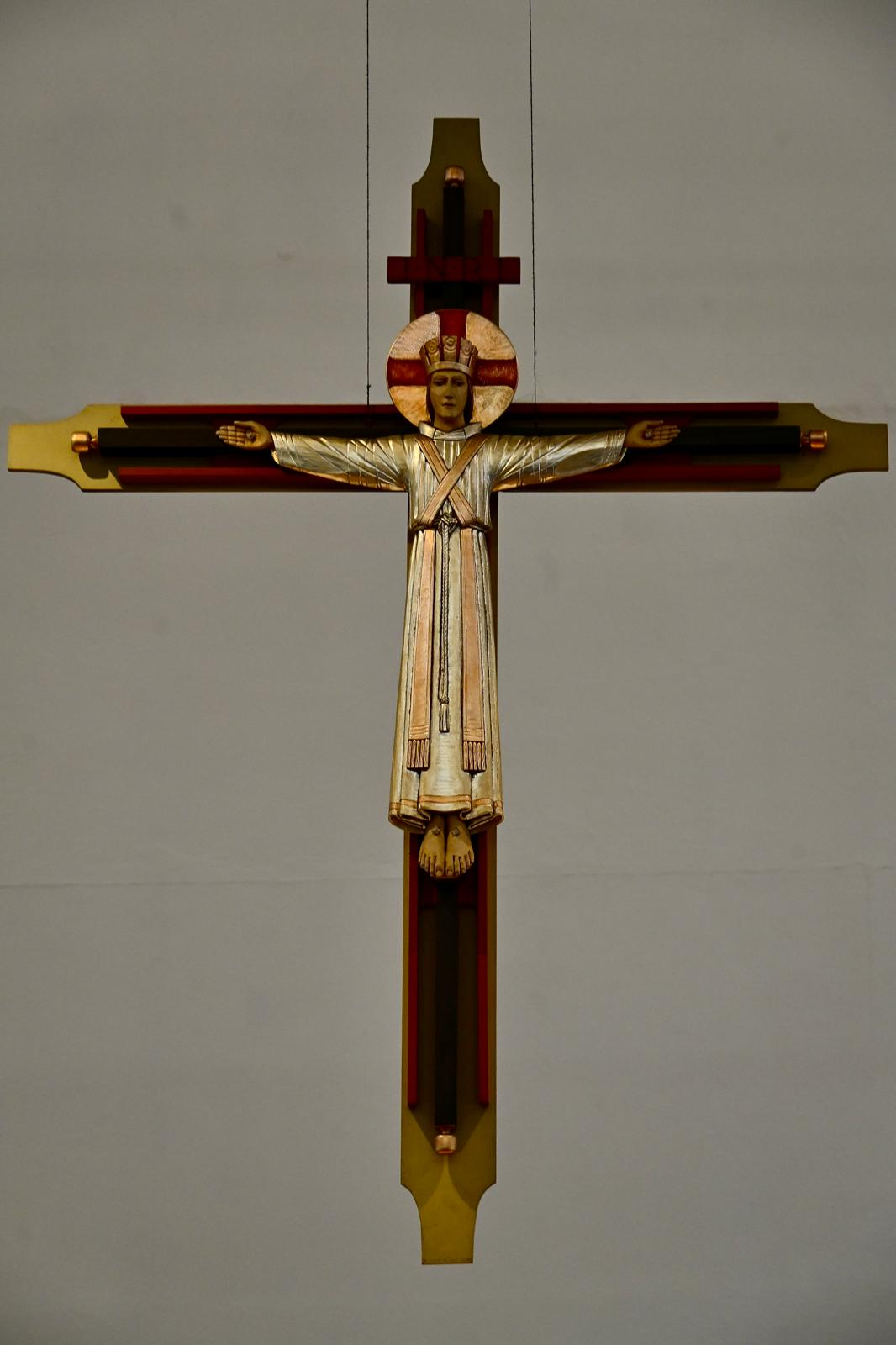
Crucifix

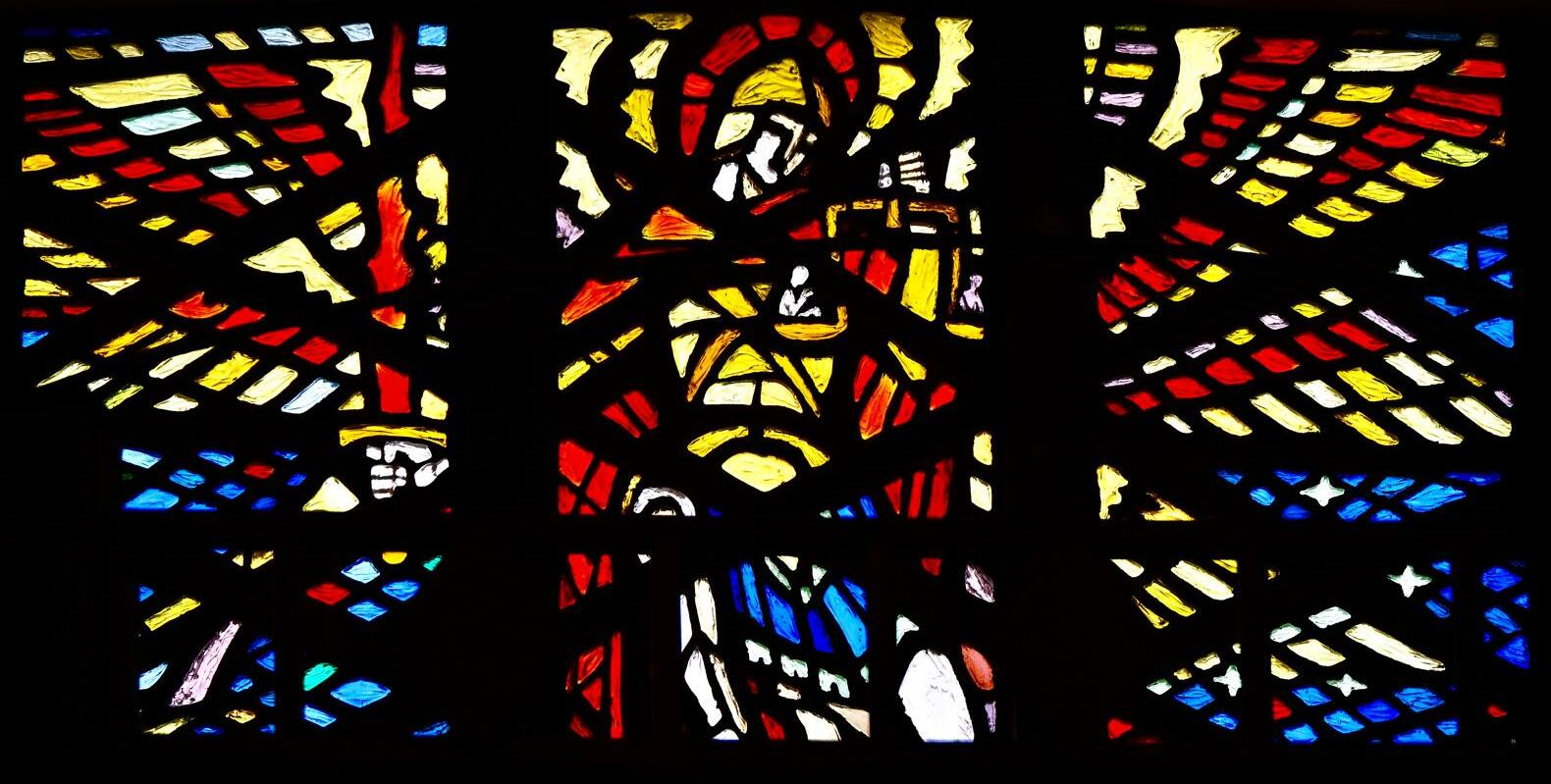
Clerestory glass (west wall)

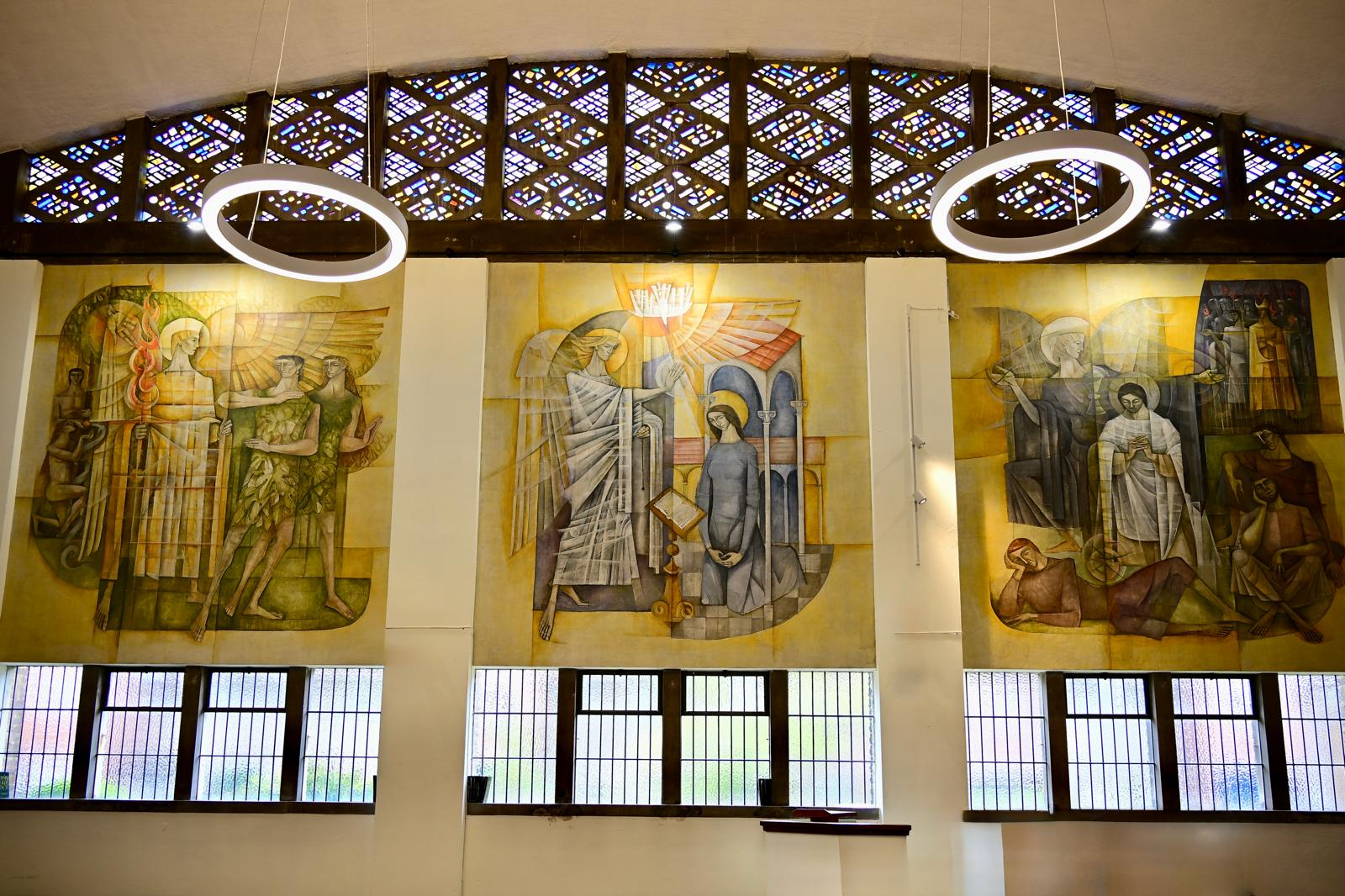
North wall murals

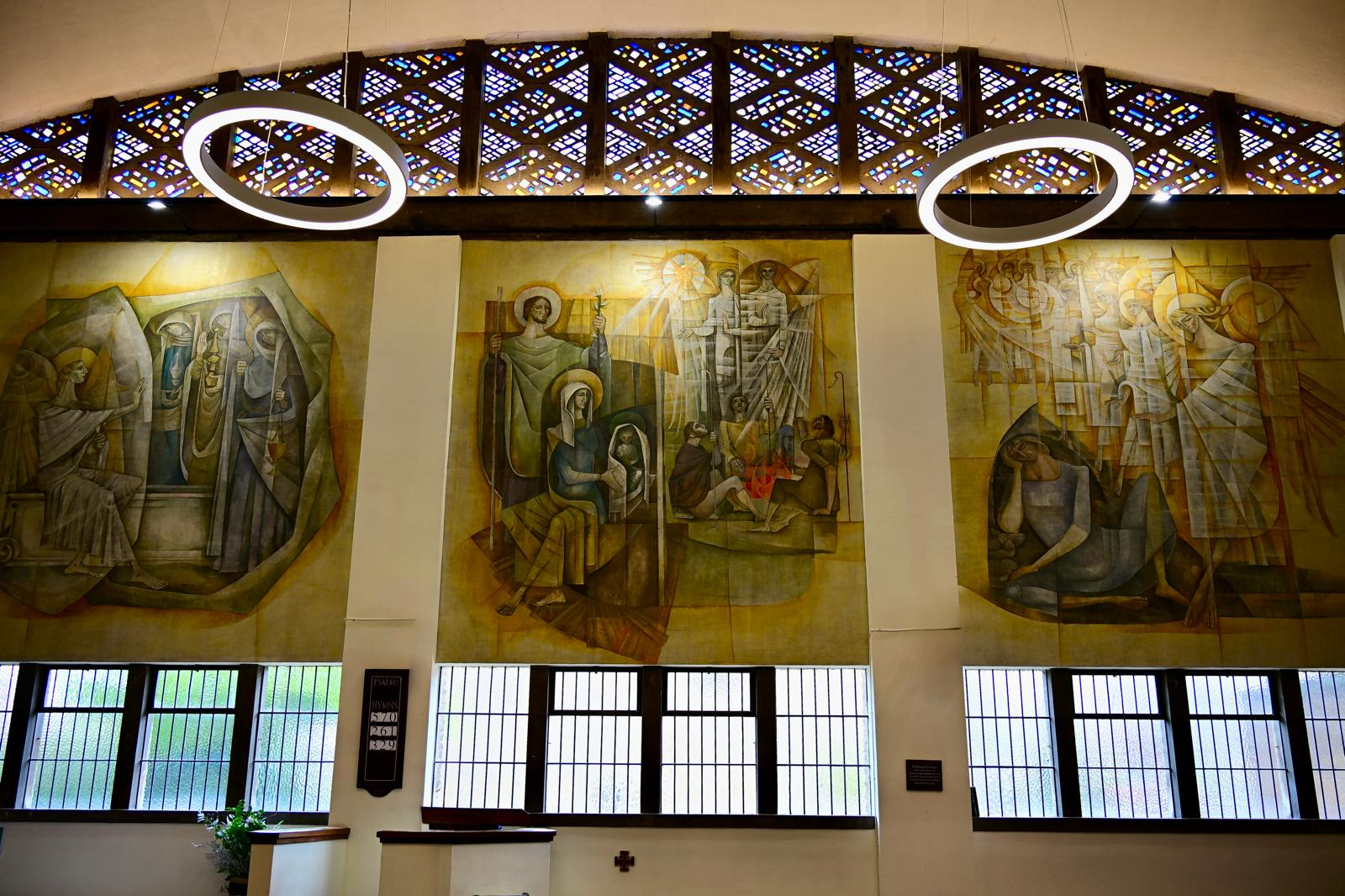
South wall murals

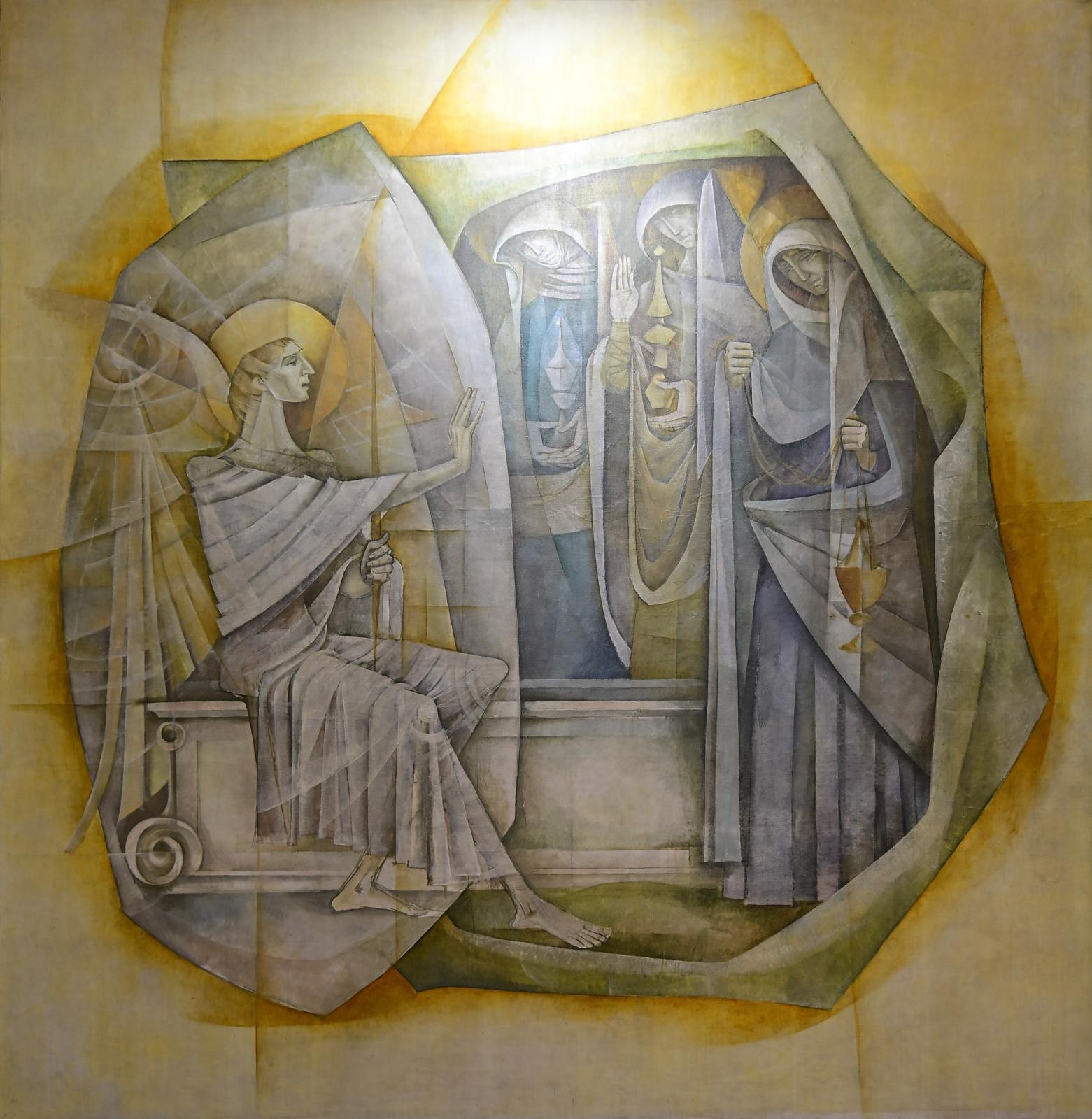
The Empty Tomb (north wall, west)

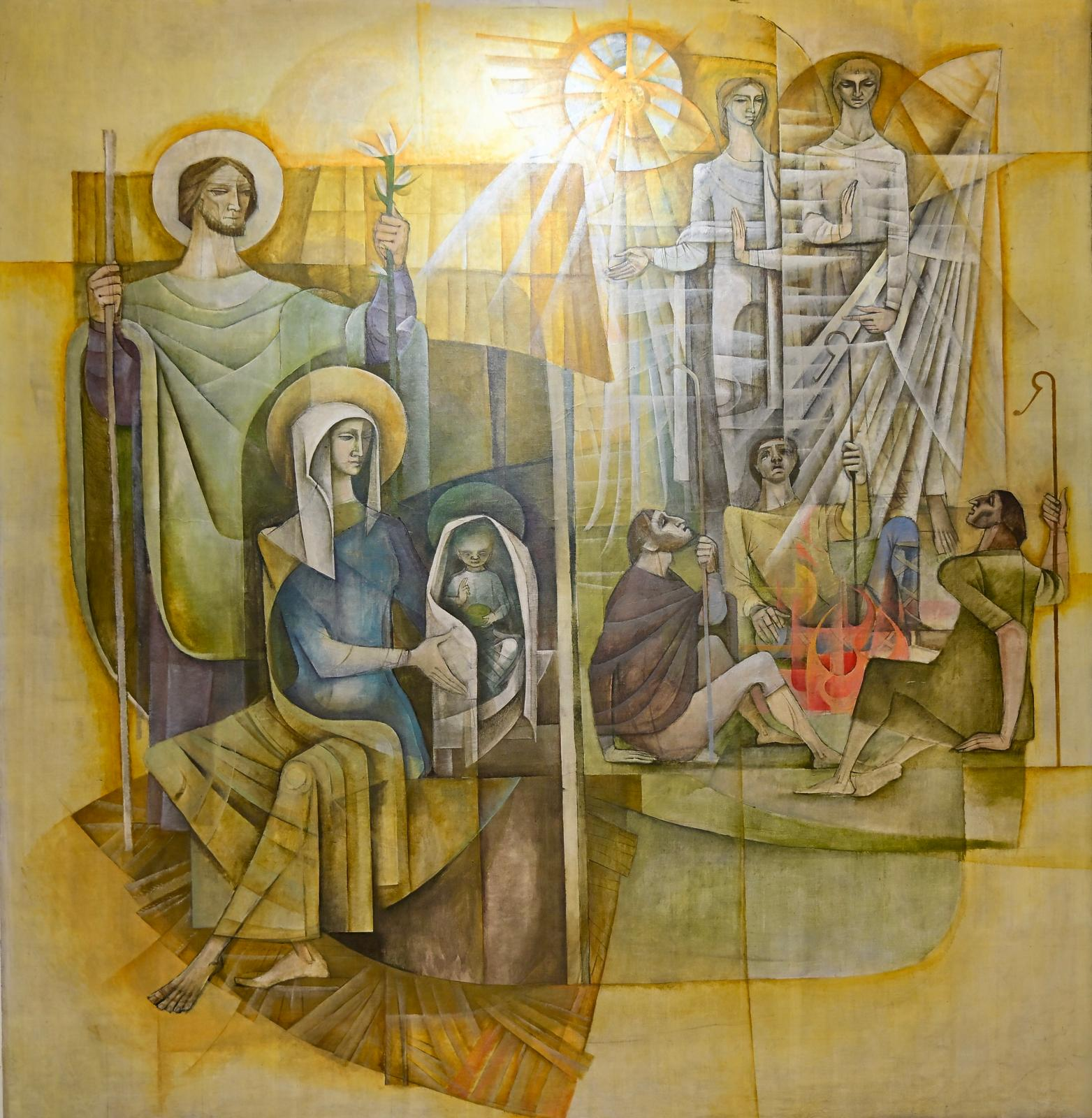
The Nativity (north wall, centre)

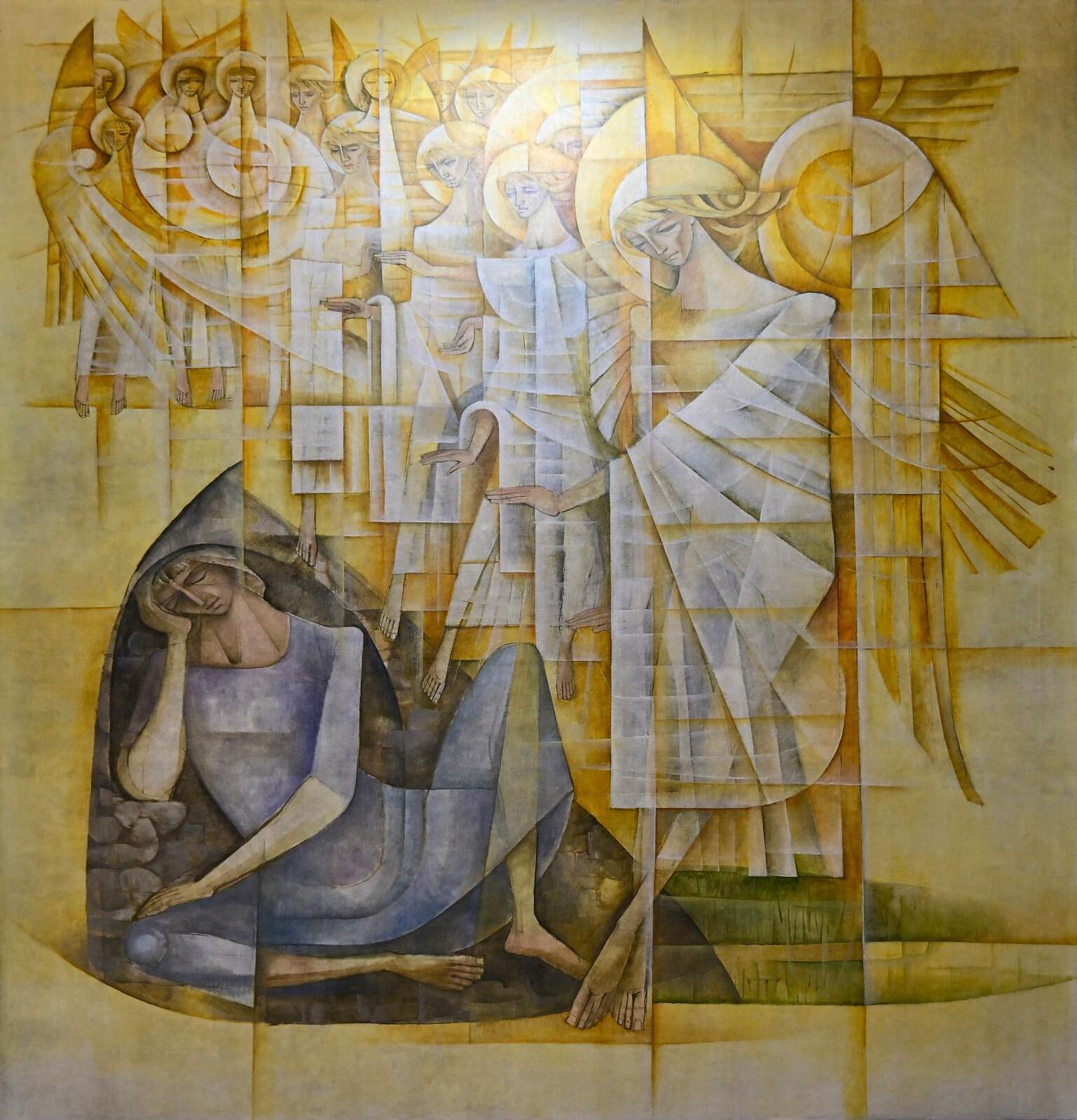
Jacob's Ladder (north wall, east)

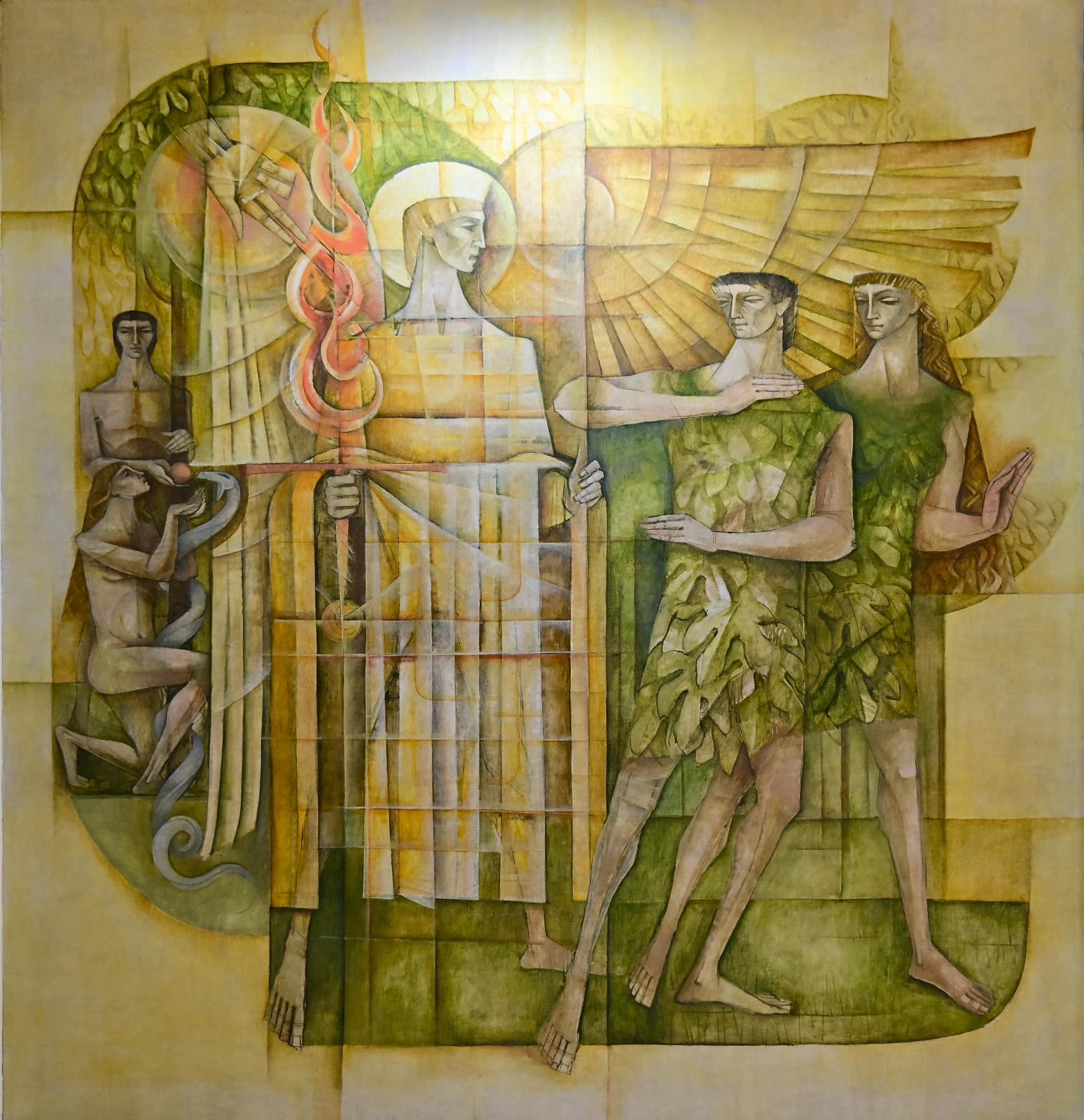
Expulsion from the Garden of Eden (south wall, east)

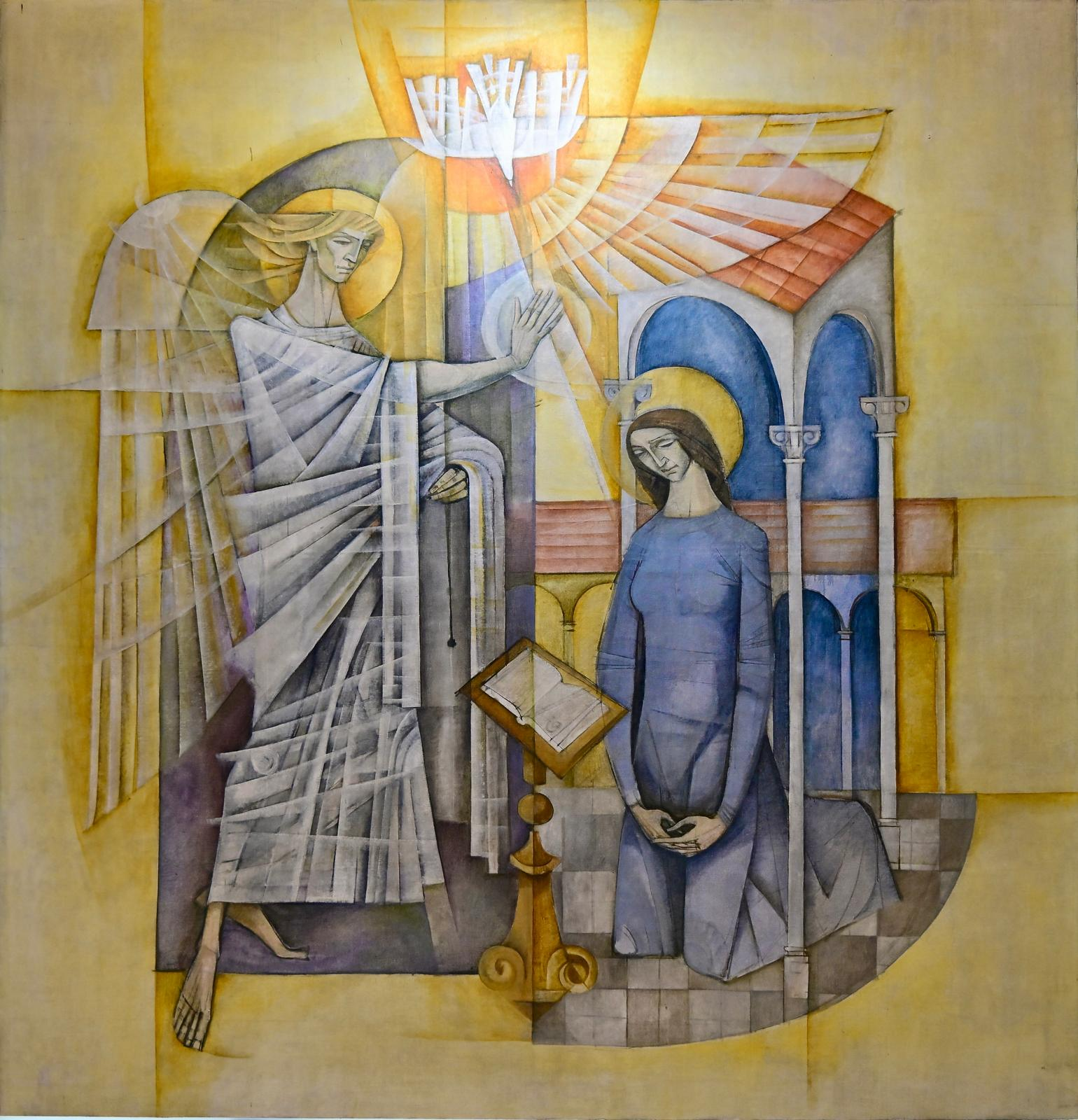
The Annunciation (south wall, centre)

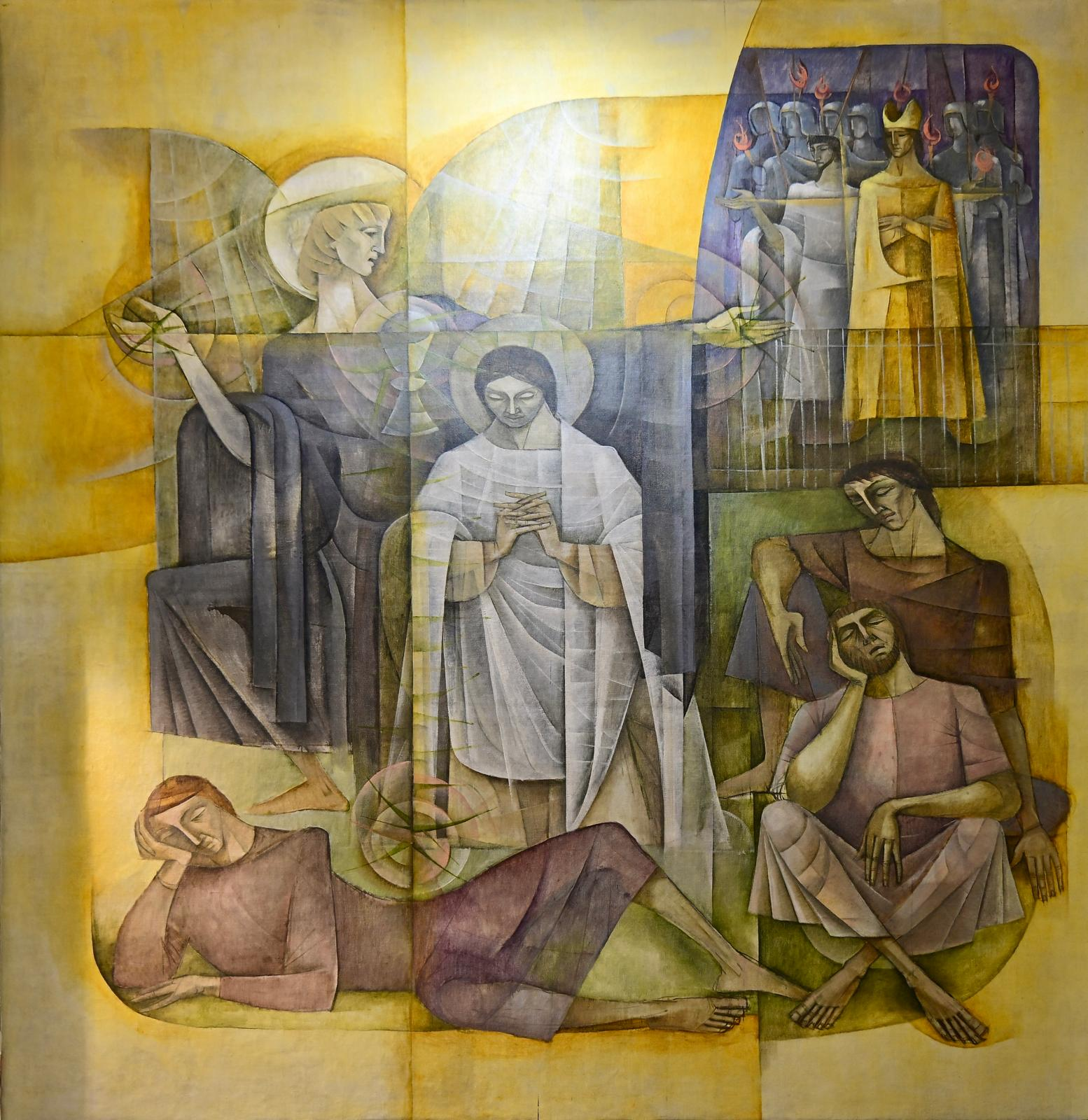
The Agony in the Garden (south wall, west)

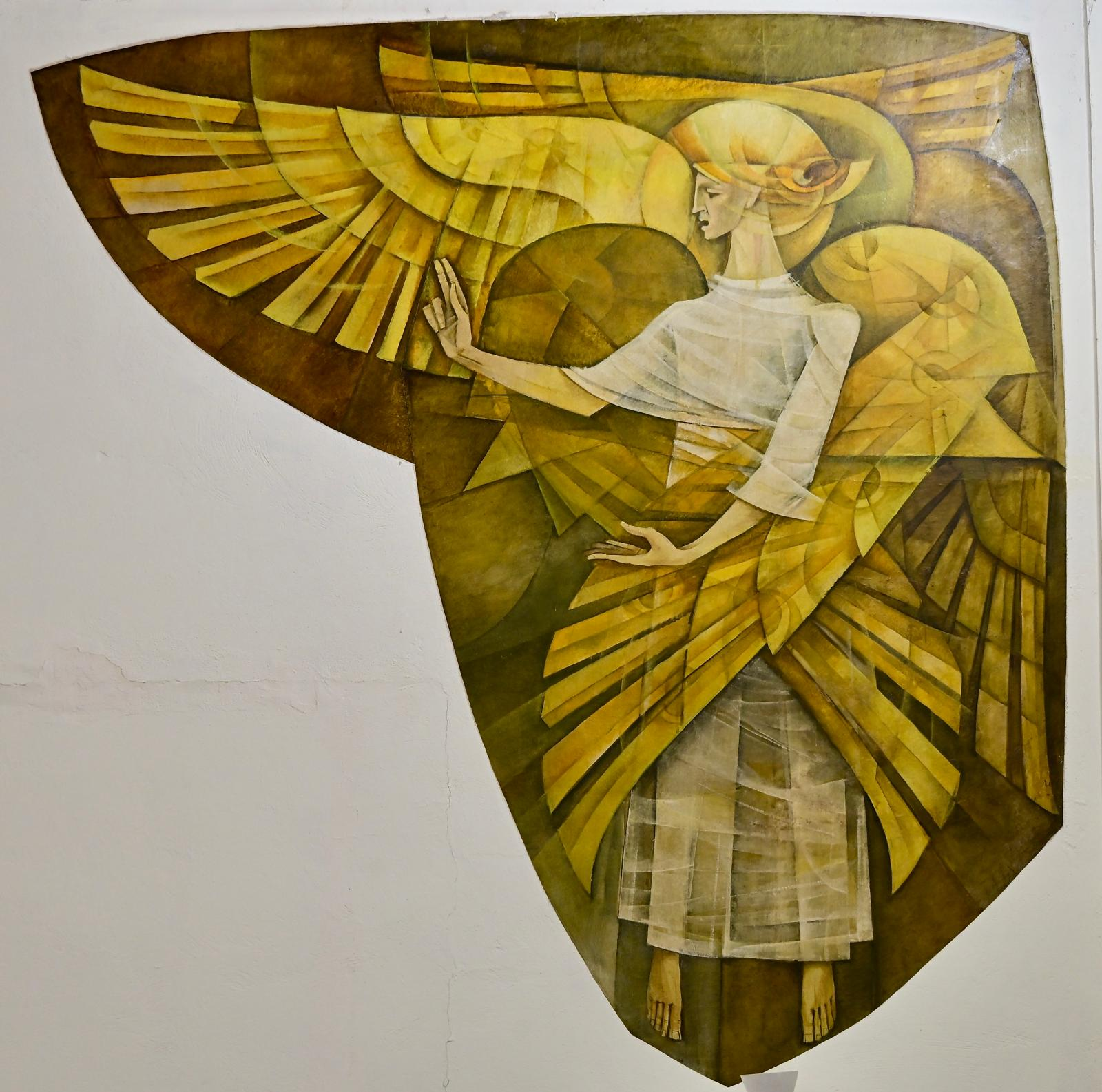
Angel mural (north)

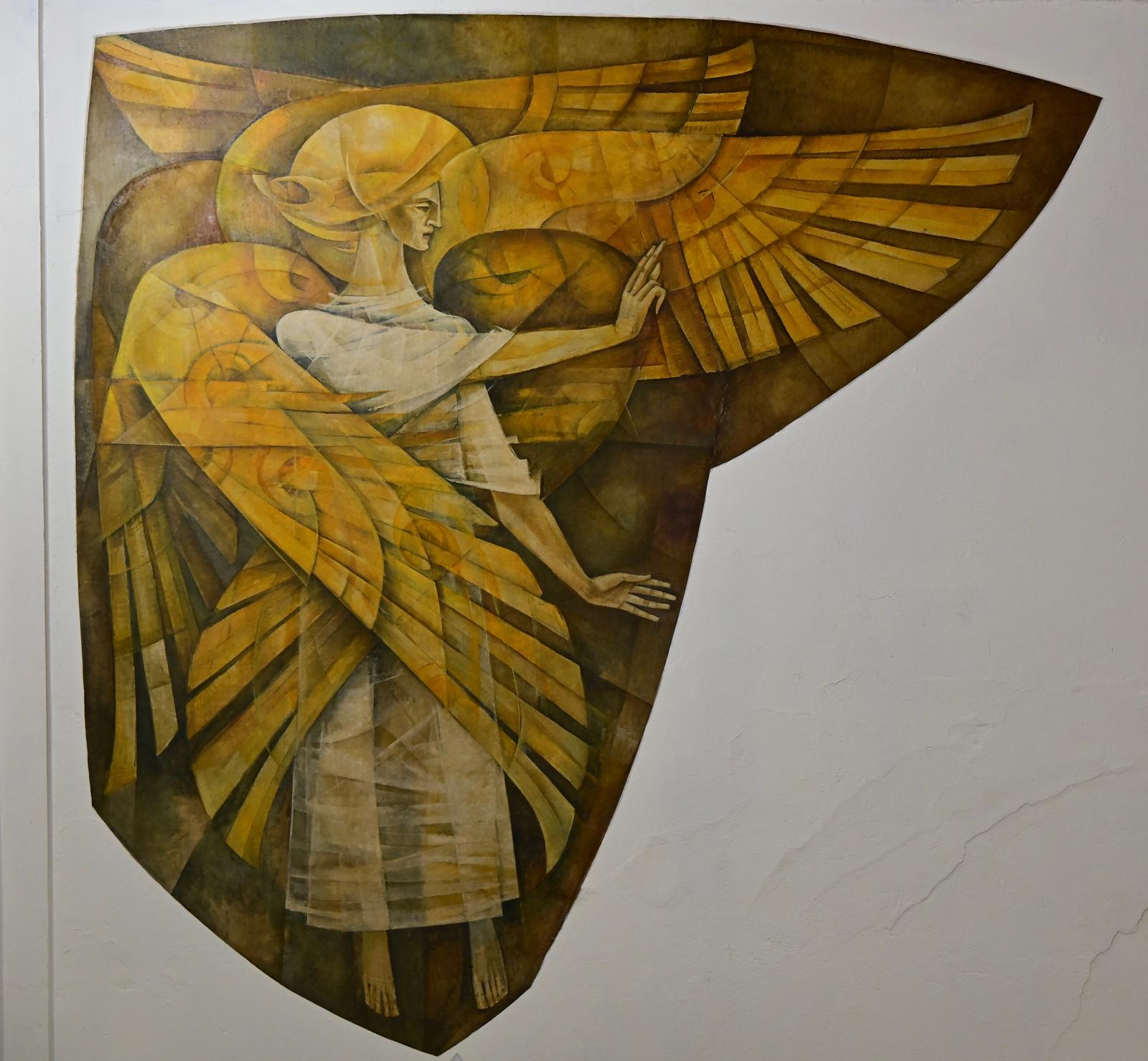
Angel mural (south)

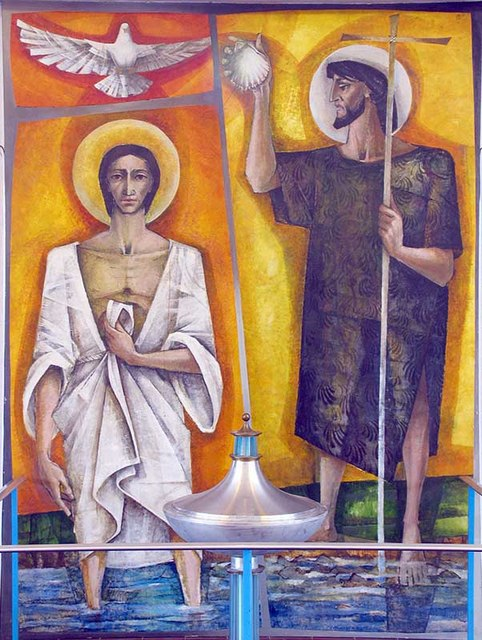
Baptism mural

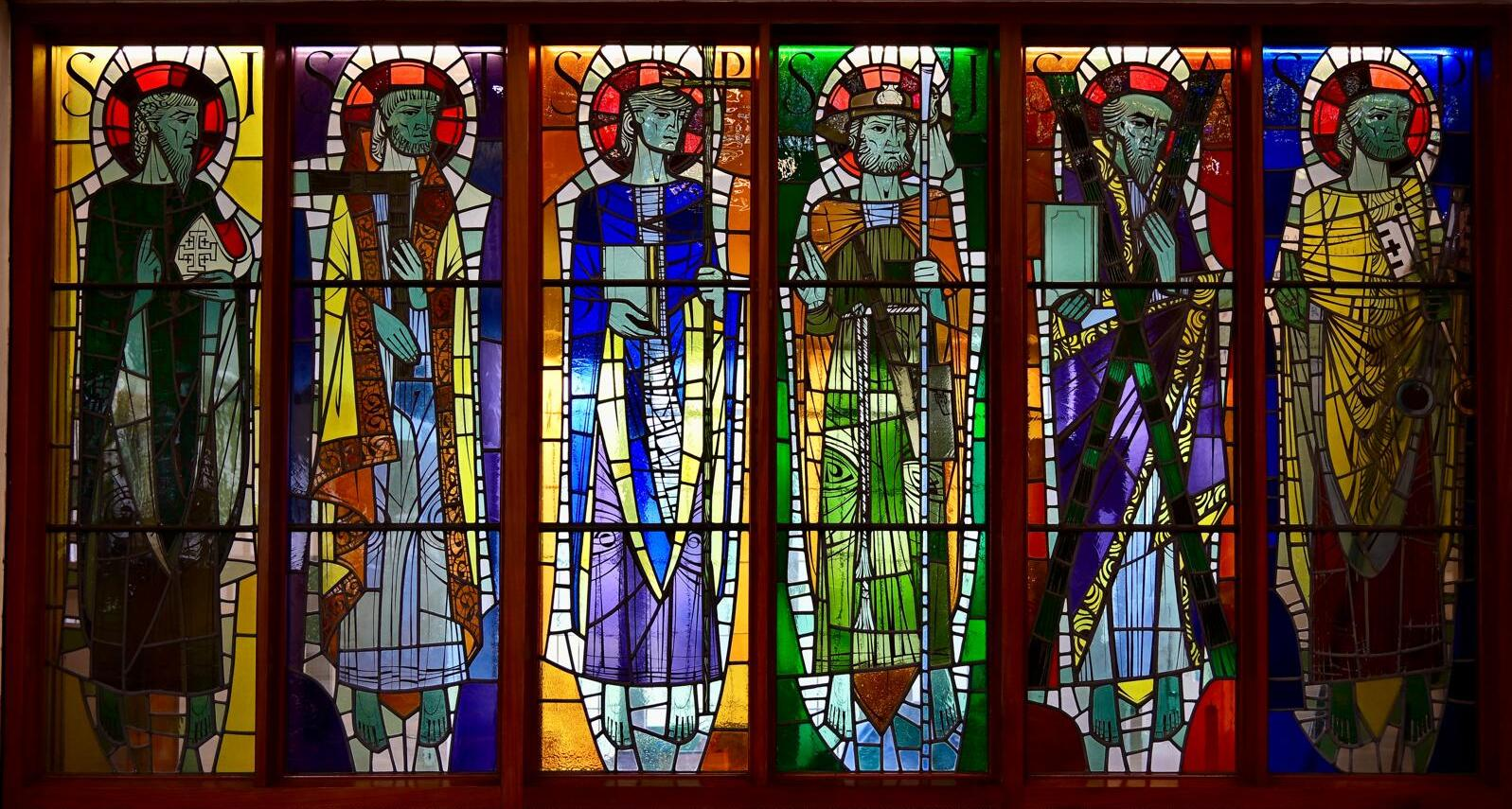
Apostles screen (north)

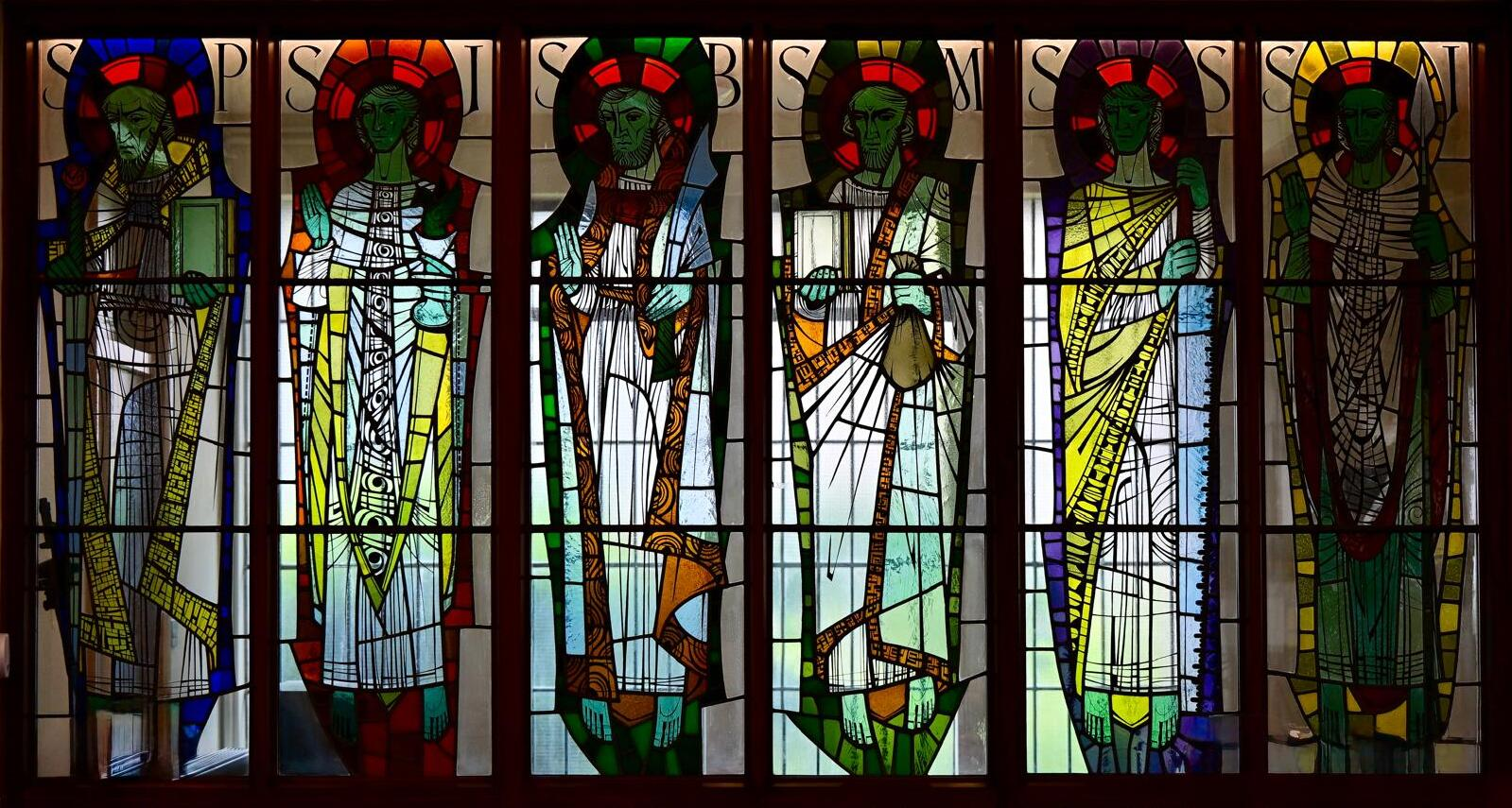
Apostles screen (south)
