= St Margaret's Church, Burnage =

Coordinates: 53.4309°N 2.2018°W

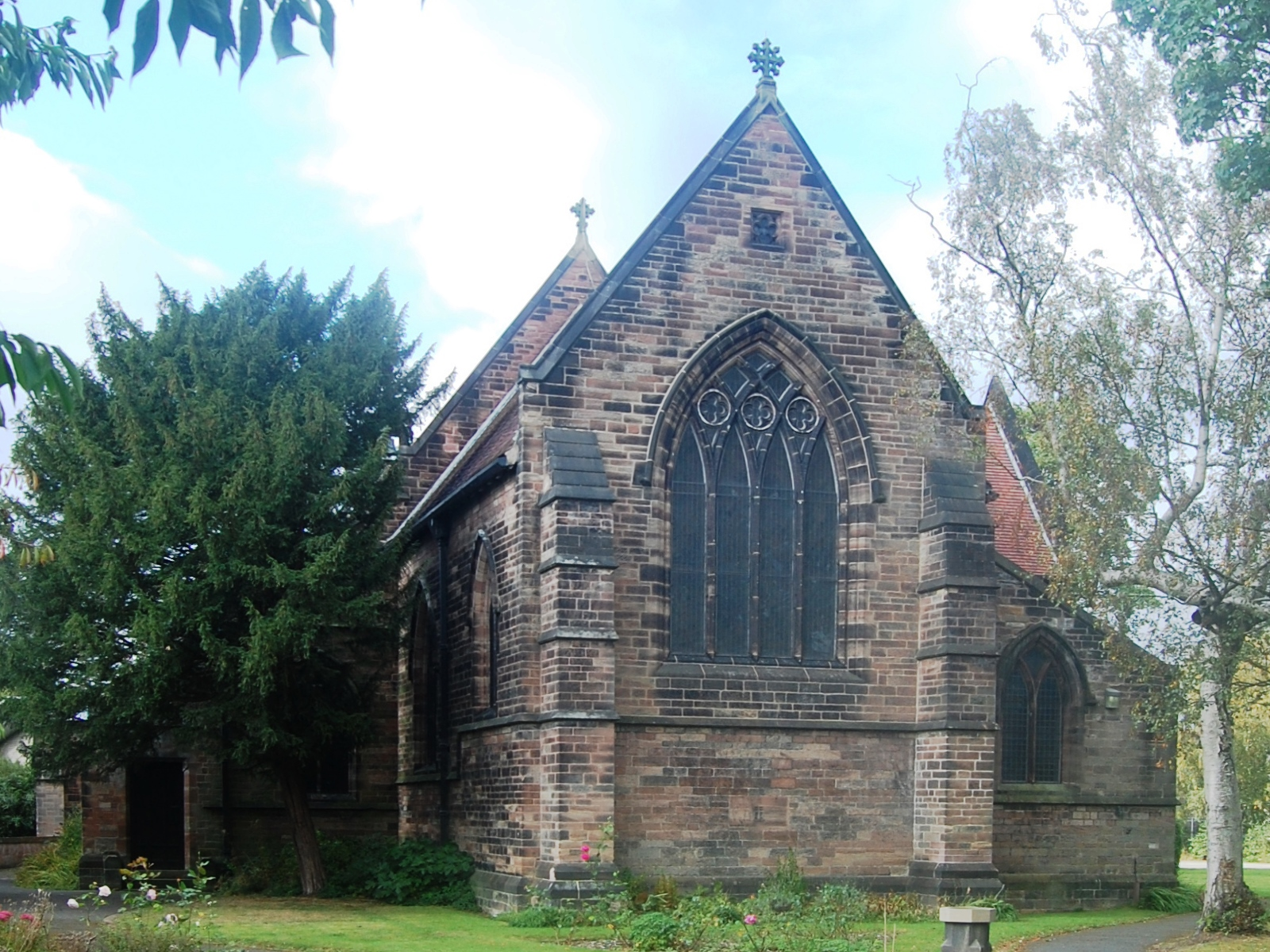
- The church in September 2021

- Location in Greater Manchester
- OS grid reference: SJ 867 927
- Location: Burnage, Manchester
- Country: England
- Denomination: Anglican
- Churchmanship: Conservative Evangelical
- Website: St Margaret, Burnage

History
- Status: Parish church
- Consecrated: 15 March 1875

Architecture
- Functional status: Active
- Heritage designation: Grade II
- Designated: 9 February 2012
- Architect: Paley and Austin
- Architectural type: Church
- Groundbreaking: 1874
- Completed: 1926

Specifications
- Materials: Sandstone

Administration
- Province: York
- Diocese: Manchester
- Archdeaconry: Manchester
- Deanery: Manchester North & East
- Parish: St Margaret, Burnage

Clergy
- Rector: Revd Matthew Calladine

St Margaret's Church is in Burnage Lane, Burnage, a neighbourhood of Manchester, England. It is an active Anglican parish church in the deanery of Heaton, the archdeaconry of Manchester, and the diocese of Manchester. It is recorded in the National Heritage List for England as a Grade II listed building, having been designated on 9 February 2012.

== History ==
The church was built in 1874–75 and designed by the Lancaster partnership of Paley and Austin. It was consecrated on 15 March 1875 by the Bishop of Manchester. It initially consisted of a three-bay nave, a chancel and a south aisle, providing seating for about 200 people. The site for the church was given by Lord Egerton of Tatton Park. In 1881–82 the same architects added the bellcote, followed by the clergy vestry, a reredos and the organ screen in 1885. In 1901 the successors in the practice, Austin and Paley added the north aisle at a cost of £3,000 (equivalent to £320,000 as of 2025). Further work was carried out on the west end of the church by the same practice in 1925–26, and a baptistry, and two porches were added. In 1998 the oak pulpit and choir stalls were removed, and the pews were replaced by chairs.

== Architecture ==
St Margaret's is constructed in sandstone. Its plan consists of a three-bay nave, north and south aisles, a south porch, a baptistery, and a chancel. The architectural style is Decorated. In the Buildings of England series, the authors describe the interior as "well-proportioned", and with a "single-framed roof". The reredos dates from 1885. The memorials to the World Wars have been designed to match the reredos; the inscriptions are on small tiles, separated by gold mosaic. The stained glass includes a window in the south aisle dated 1894 depicting Faith, Hope and Charity. In the south wall of the chancel is a window dating from about 1920 by Walter J. Pearce, and in the east of the south aisle is a window from about 1950 by T. F. Wilford. Also dating from 1950 is a window in the baptistery depicting Scouts, Guides, Cubs and Brownies. The two-manual organ was built by George Sixsmith and Son in 1973. It replaced an earlier three-manual organ.

== See also ==
- Listed buildings in Manchester-M19
- List of ecclesiastical works by Paley and Austin
