= St Edmund, Chingford =

Coordinates: 51.615238°N 0.016184°W

St Edmund's Church, Chingford
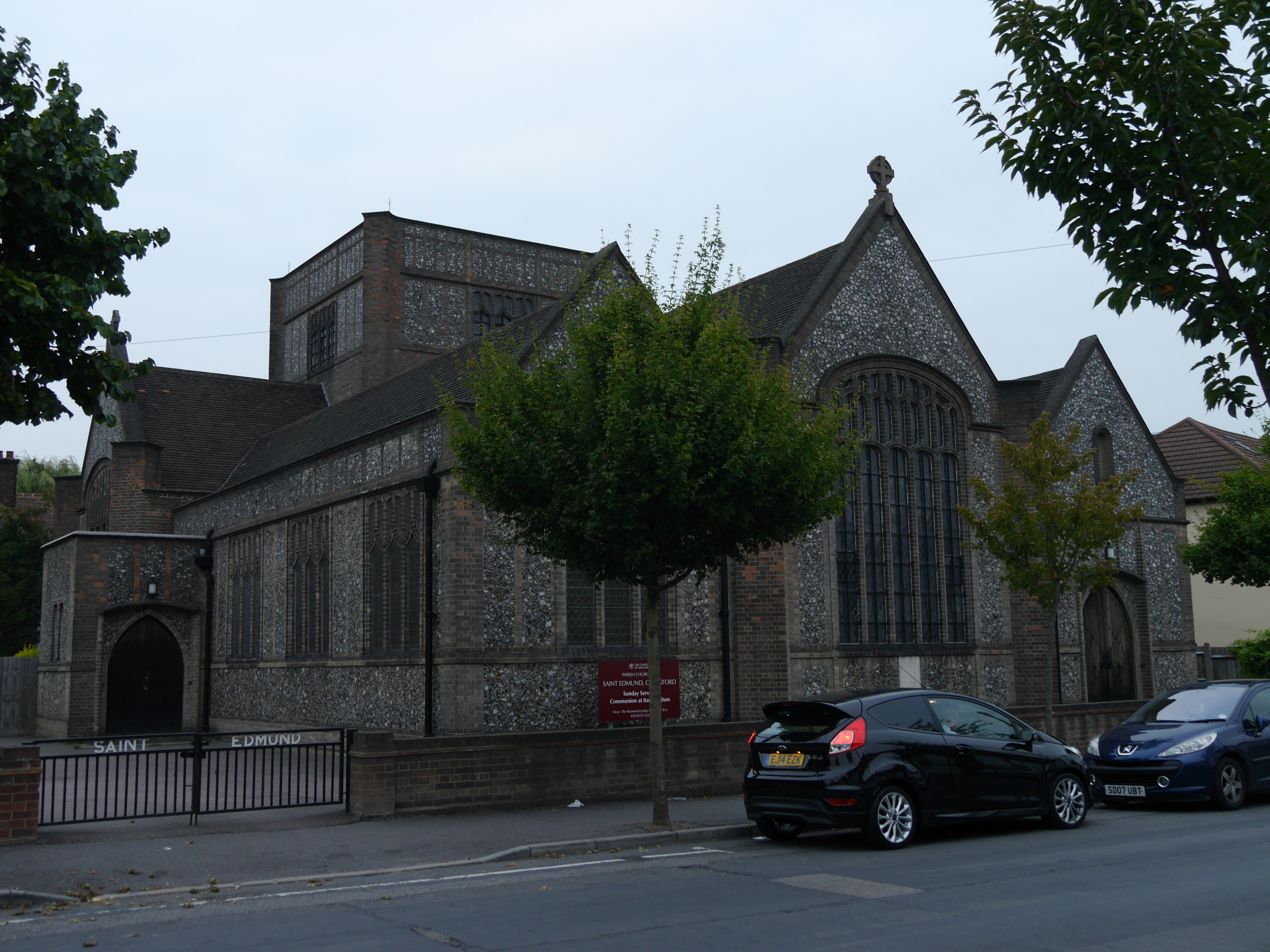
- View of the western end of St Edmund's Church
- St Edmund's Church, Chingford
- Location: Larkswood Road Chingford, London, E4 9DS
- Country: England
- Denomination: Church of England
- Website: https://stedmund.org.uk/

History
- Status: Active
- Dedication: Edmund the Martyr
- Dedicated: 1909 (original building)

Architecture
- Functional status: Parish church
- Heritage designation: Grade II listed
- Designated: 24 February 1987
- Architect: Nugent Cachemaille-Day
- Style: Simplified Perpendicular Gothic
- Years built: 1938 (present building)

Administration
- Diocese: Chelmsford
- Archdeaconry: West Ham

The Church of St Edmund, Chingford, is a Grade II listed Church of England parish church at Larkswood Road, Chingford, in Greater London.

== History ==
St Edmund's Church was originally consecrated in January 1909 by the Bishop of St Albans as a chapel of ease for the parish church of St Peter and St Paul, Chingford, in a building now known as the Ryan Hall in Chingford Mount Road. A church hall was built in 1927.

The present church was built in 1938; the architect was Nugent Cachemaille-Day, who was a leading British exponent of Expressionist architecture. It has a nave of four bays, with two wide aisles, transepts and a short chancel. A low square tower is over the crossing. The style is described as "simplified perpendicular Gothic". The exterior is clad in knapped flint, reflecting the vernacular Essex tradition. A separate ecclesiastical parish was formed for St Edmund's in 1939. It became a Grade II listed building in 1987.

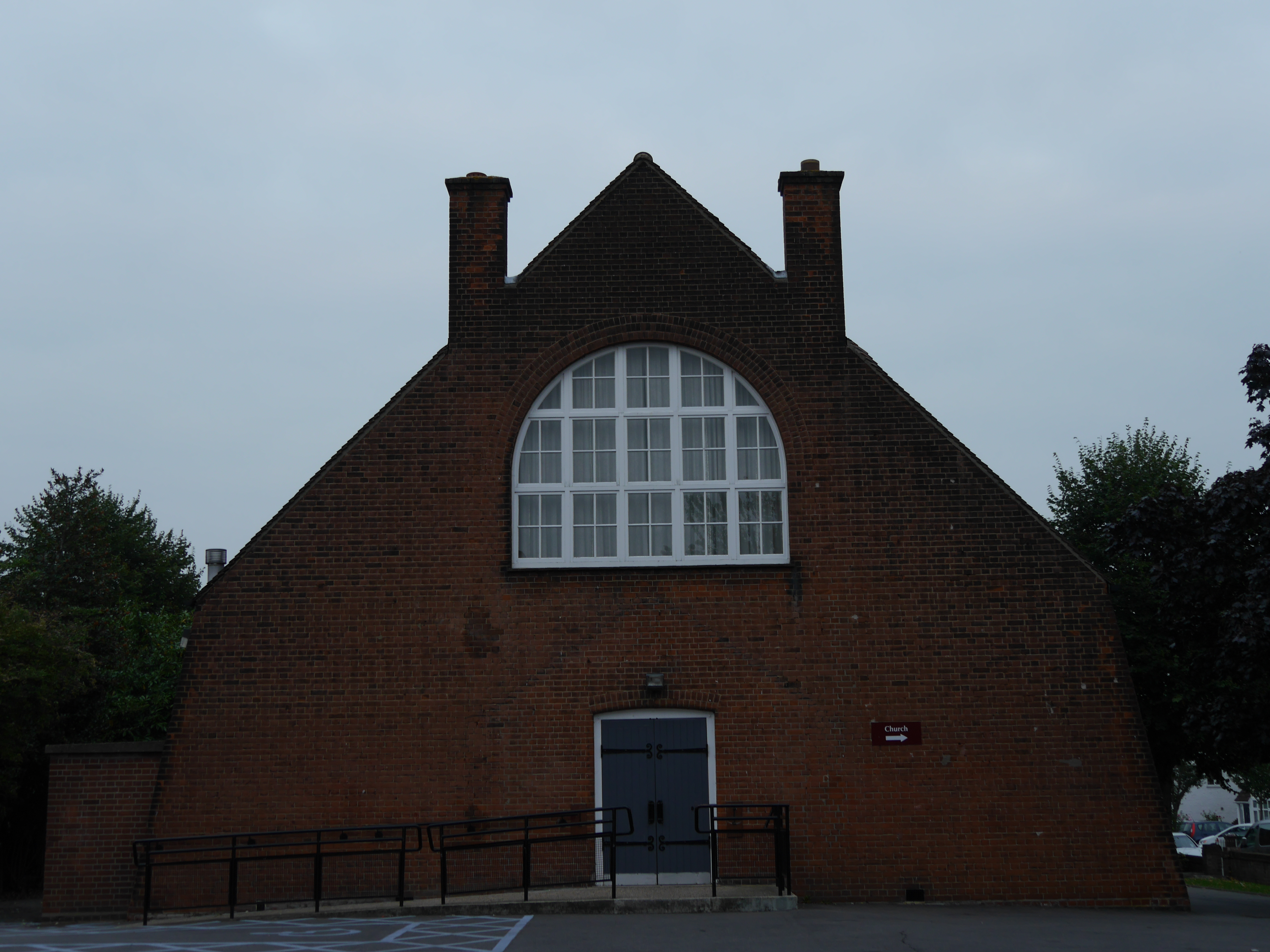
The original St Edmund's church building of 1909 in Chingford Mount Road, now known as Ryan Hall.
