= St Philip's Church, Avondale Square =

Parish church in London

Coordinates: 51.4866°N 0.0694°W

- Church of St Philip and St Mark, Camberwell
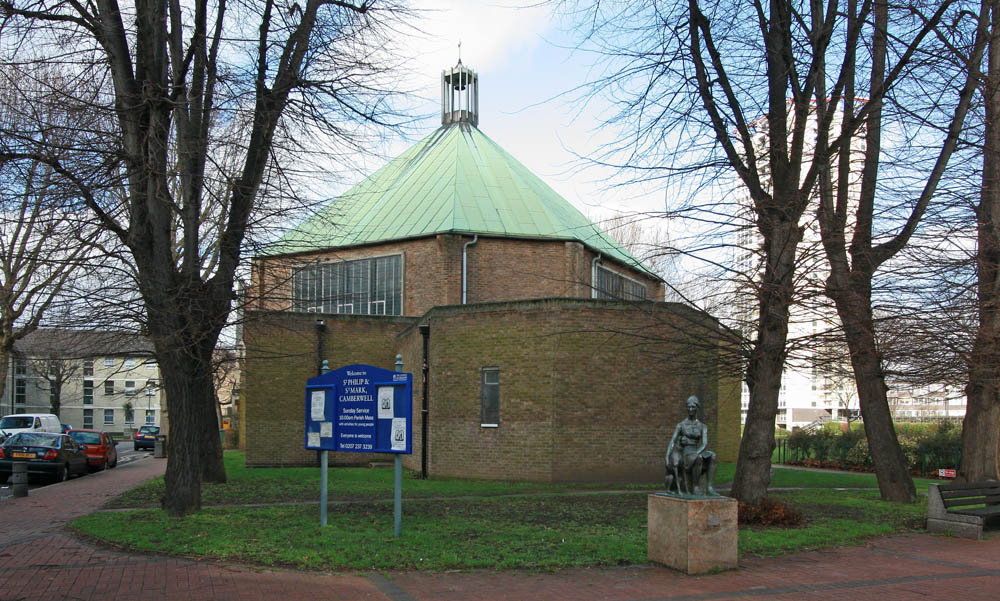
- St Philip's Church, Avondale Square, with Woman and Dog by Anthony Weller in front
- St Philip's Church, Avondale Square
- OS grid reference: TQ 34140 78172
- Location: Avondale Square, London, SE1 5PD
- Country: England
- Denomination: Church of England
- Churchmanship: Inclusive Catholic

History
- Status: Parish church
- Dedicated: 1963

Architecture
- Functional status: Active

Administration
- Diocese: Southwark
- Archdeaconry: Southwark
- Deanery: Bermondsey and Rotherhithe
- Parish: St Philip and St Mark, Camberwell

Clergy
- Vicar: The Revd Helen Harknett

St Philip's Church, Avondale Square (also known as St Philip the Apostle, Camberwell and St Philip and St Mark's, Camberwell) is a Church of England parish church within the Avondale Square Estate in Camberwell in the London Borough of Southwark. It is dedicated to St Philip the Apostle. The church is in the Archdeaconry of Southwark, in the Diocese of Southwark.

== Temporary church ==
Baptismal registers commence in 1866, and a temporary church was probably erected at that point. No details are known of the temporary church.

== First permanent church ==
The permanent church was built in 1875 by Henry Edward Coe (1826–85), who had been a pupil of Gilbert Scott. It was repaired after bomb damage in WWI. The church consisted of a half-octagonal chancel with north organ chamber and south vestry, a five-bay nave, a south transept, and north and south aisles. It was built of Kentish ragstone with dressed details, and was designed in late 13th-century style. The organ was by Bevington & Sons.

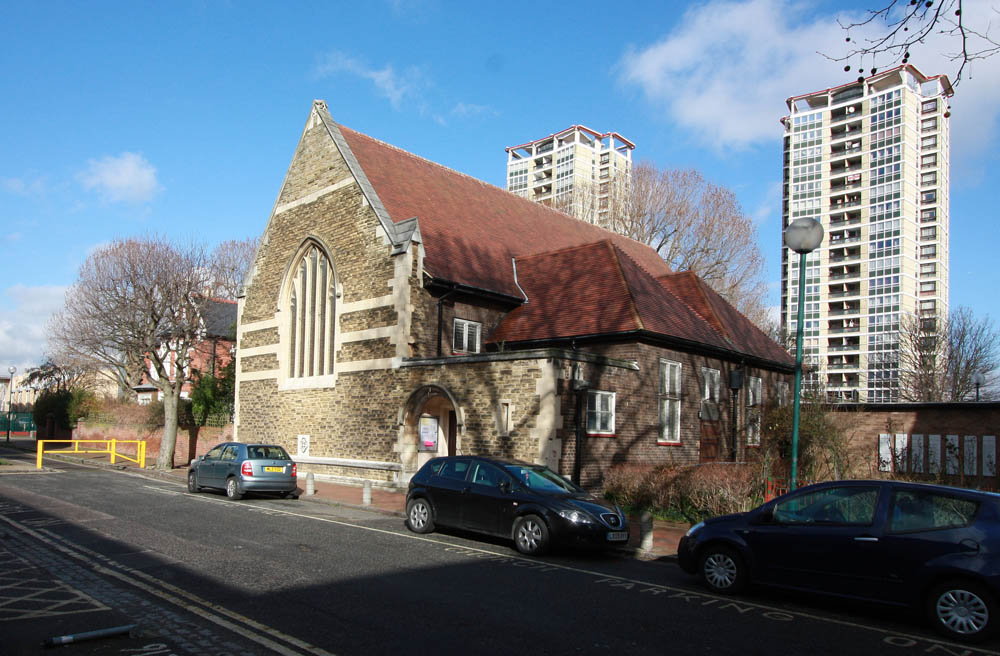
The church hall

It was so badly damaged by bombing in WWII that it was demolished. The church hall (also dating from 1875, and by Coe) was rebuilt in 1953.

== Replacement church ==
The replacement church was designed by Nugent Cachemaille-Day, and was dedicated in 1963. It was one of Cachemaille-Day's last works. The main body of the church is in the form of an octagon. There is a lady chapel (with aumbry).

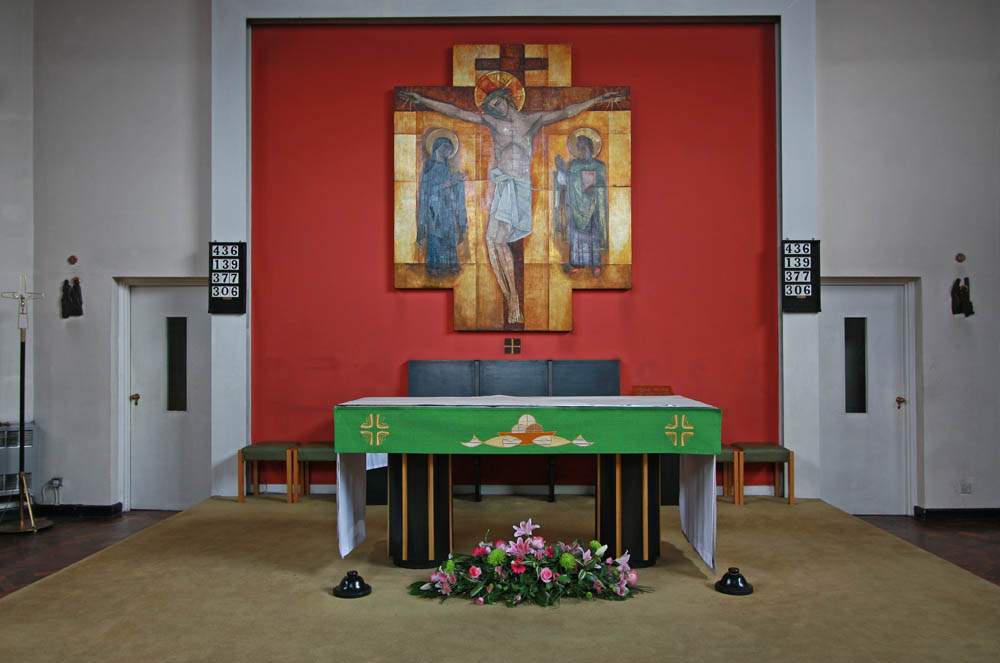
The sanctuary, with the reredos by John Hayward

The reredos depicts the Crucifixion, with the Blessed Virgin and St John at the foot of the Cross. The ceiling depicts the four archangels (Gabriel, Michael, Raphael and Uriel) and the Holy Spirit as a dove. Both the reredos and the ceiling are the work of John Hayward. Internal decorations were undertaken by Campbell, Smith & Co Ltd. Stained glass is by Christopher Webb and Cachemaile-Day.

The organ is by Henry Willis & Sons and was previously in Liverpool Cathedral. A 1962 sculpture by Anthony Weller (1927–94), Woman and dog is outside the church.

The church of St Mark's, Camberwell (designed by Norman Shaw in 1880), was made redundant in 1965, and the parish merged in with that of St Philip's. The double dedication of St Philip and St Mark is the result of the merger.

From 2012 to 2018 the peripatetic Southwark and District Model Railway Club was located in the church hall.
