= Nugent Cachemaille-Day =

English architect (1896–1976)

Nugent Francis Cachemaille-Day
- Born: 23 July 1896; South Woodford
- Died: 4 May 1976 (aged 79); Brighton
- Occupation: Architect
- Practice: Welch, Cachemaille-Day, and Lander (1929–35); Independent (1935–)

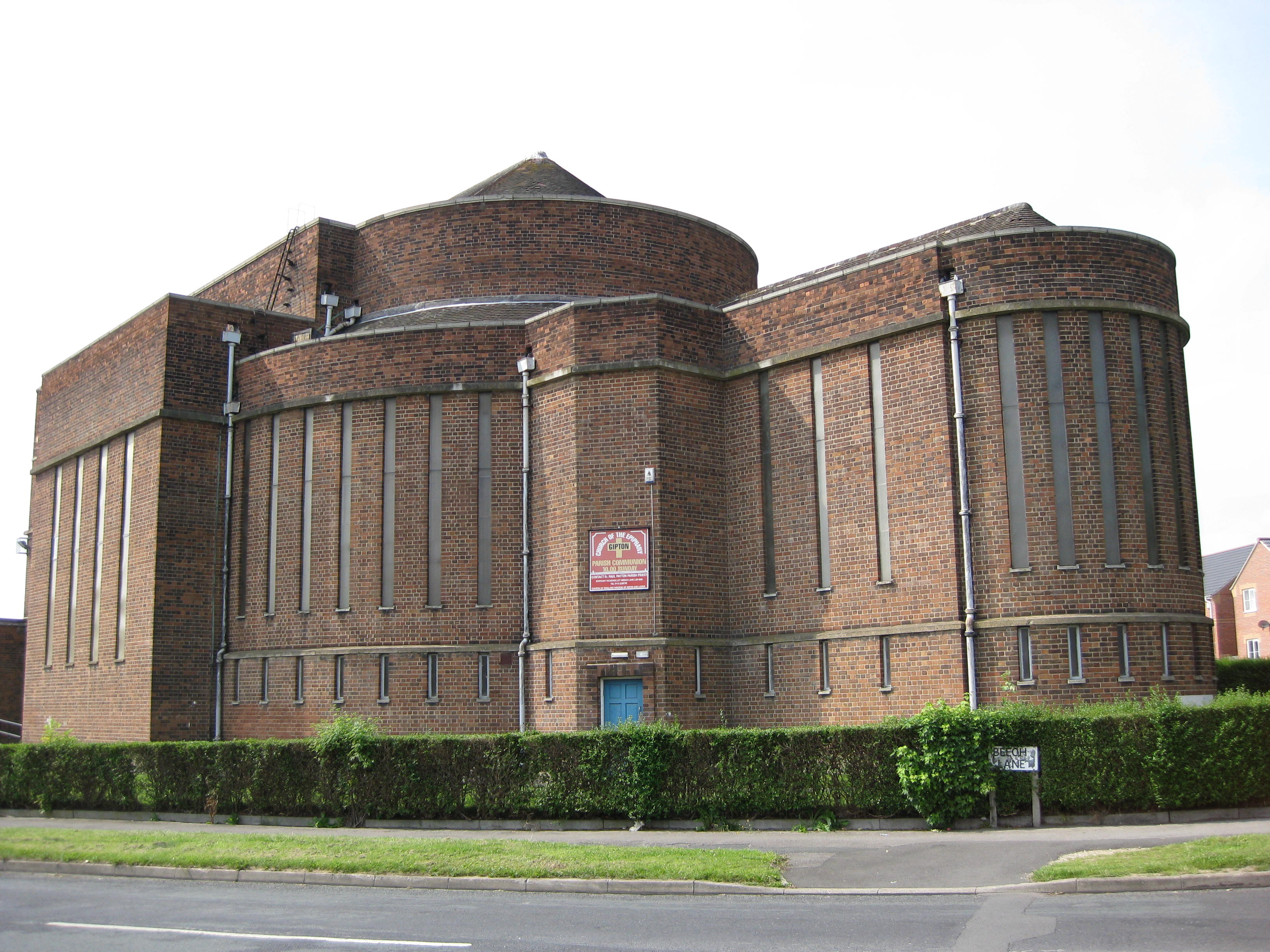
Church of the Epiphany, Gipton, Leeds, West Yorkshire, completed in 1938

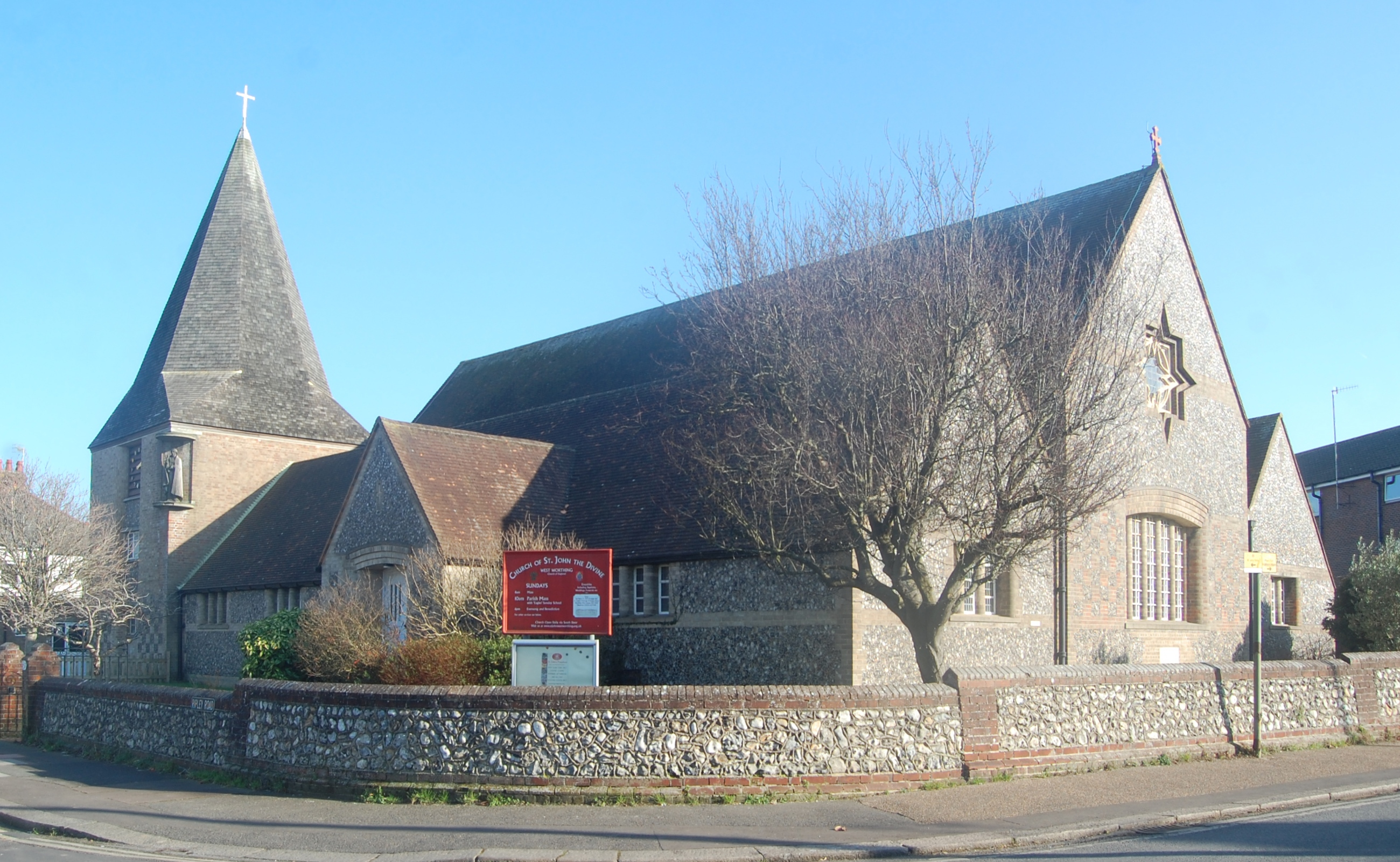
St John the Divine parish church, West Worthing, West Sussex, built in the 1930s. The tower and spire were designed by Cachemaille-Day and added in the 1960s.

Nugent Francis Cachemaille Cachemaille-Day (Note: Cachemaille-Day was baptised Nugent Francis Cachemaille Day, but in 1924 changed his surname to Cachemaille-Day by deed poll, retaining Cachemaille as a middle name) (23 July 1896 – 4 May 1976), often referred to as NF Cachemaille-Day, was an English architect who designed some of the most "revolutionary" 20th-century churches in the country. His Church of St Nicholas, Burnage has been called "a milestone in the history of church architecture in England." He was a leading British exponent of Expressionist architecture.

Cachemaille-Day was born 23 July 1896 in South Woodford to Harvey Francis Day and Katie Margaret Mary, née Cachemaille. He attended Westminster School. After training at the Architectural Association, Cachemaille-Day set up practice with Felix Lander and Herbert Welch as "Welch, Cachemaille-Day, and Lander" in 1929. Their work included the Haymills Estate in Hanger Hill. In 1935 Cachemaille-Day began an independent practice. Shortly afterwards he designed the Church of St Michael and All Angels, Northenden (1936–37), which well illustrates his absorption of "Continental experiments." Pevsner described it as "a sensational church for its country and its day."

From the 1930s Cachemaille-Day became known for his churches, some of which are the most innovative ecclesiastical buildings of their time. He was one of the leading English architects to embrace the Liturgical Movement. Between 1931 and 1963 he designed at least 61 churches, many of which are now listed buildings.

The churches designed by Henry Cachemaille-Day include St Alban's Church, Southampton, Church of St Nicholas, Burnage, and St Philip's Church, Avondale Square. The interior of St Barnabas' Church, Gloucester, built on Stroud Road south of the city at the foot of the Cotswolds, features a hall-church design characterized by interchanging Gothic architecture within a large open space, reflecting architectural influences associated with the Gothic style.

St Edmund, Chingford, built in 1938, is Grade II listed. A pulpit designed by Cachemaille-Day for St-John-at-Hackney church was removed from the church and sold as part of a redevelopment in 2021.

After the end of the Second World War Cachemaille-Day was widely engaged on the repair or complete rebuilding of a number of churches that had been damaged or destroyed during The Blitz. The post-war economic climate meant that commissions were often driven by financial considerations as much as liturgical ones. Cachemaille-Day's preferred modernist aesthetic, which favoured experimentation with materials such as concrete in order to achieve cost savings, and his commitment to the principles of church planning that had been recommended by the Liturgical Movement, positioned him well with potential patrons.

New churches completed by Cachemaille-Day in the latter part of his career after the Second World War include All Saints in Hanworth, St Paul in West Hackney and St Thomas in Clapton. For the Church of St Michael and All Angels, London Fields, Cachemaille-Day worked closely with the artist John Hayward on a modernist scheme of decoration, including murals, sculpture and stained glass, that is integral to the architectural plan.

Cachemaille-Day died on 4 May 1976 at his home in Brighton.

== Sources ==
- Hartwell, Clare (2001). Manchester. Pevsner Architectural Guides. London: Penguin Books. ISBN 0-14-071131-7.
- Hartwell, Clare; Hyde, Matthew; Pevsner, Nikolaus (2004). Lancashire: Manchester and the South East. The Buildings of England. New Haven, London: Yale University Press. ISBN 0-300-10583-5.
